= Marie van Waning-Stevels =

Dutch painter (1874–1943)

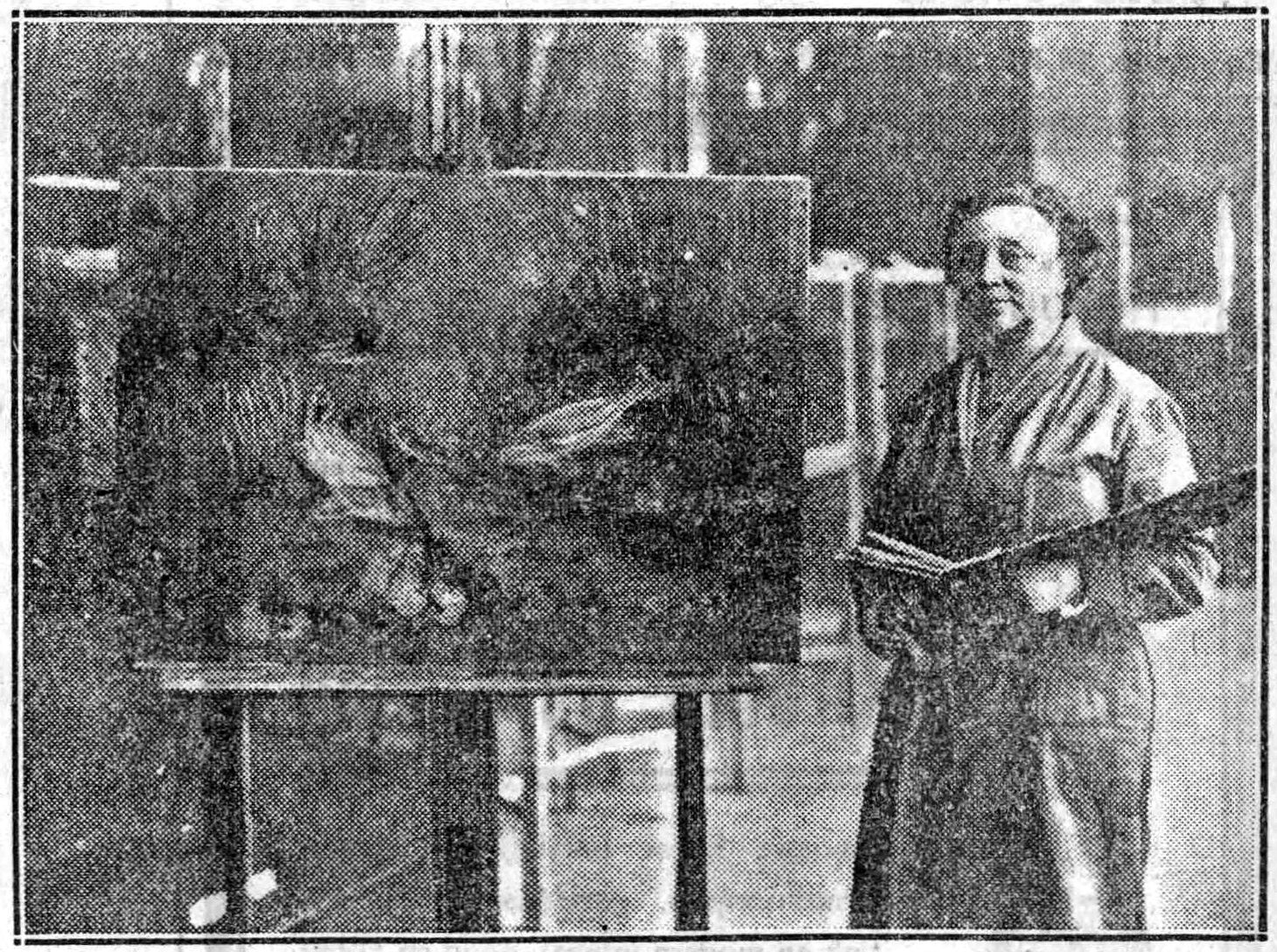
- Van Waning-Stevels at work in the Haagse Dierentuin, 1930
- Born: Marie Christina Hendrica Stevels; 2 December 1874; Gorinchem
- Died: 14 August 1943 (aged 68); Zeist
- Education: Royal Academy of Art, The Hague; pupil of Carolus Lambertus Waning and Kees van Waning
- Spouse: Kees van Waning (m. 1906)

Marie van Waning-Stevels (2 December 1874 – 14 August 1943), born Marie Christina Hendrica Stevels, was a Dutch painter and draughtswoman. She painted aquariums, flowers and birds, among other subjects, and was a working member of the Pulchri Studio artists' society.

== Life ==
Van Waning-Stevels was born in Gorinchem and died in Zeist.

She took the painting course at the Academy of Fine Arts in The Hague from about 1892 to 1900. She was taught by the sculptor and woodcarver Carolus Lambertus Waning and by the painter Kees van Waning. She married the latter on 20 August 1906 in Rijswijk. Kees van Waning died in October 1929.

In November 1930 it was reported that early in the following year she would celebrate 25 years as a working member of Pulchri Studio. She worked in The Hague until 1943 and in De Bilt in 1943.

== Work ==
Van Waning-Stevels painted in oils and watercolour. She made still lifes, including flower still lifes, as well as portraits, genre pieces, and animal and figure subjects. At her exhibitions at Pulchri Studio in 1929 and 1931 and at the joint exhibition at Huis van Oudheusden in 1933 she mainly showed paintings of aquariums with fish and water plants, of flowers and of birds; in 1931 pastels were also on show. In November 1930 newspapers published a photograph of her at work in the Haagse Dierentuin, the zoo in The Hague.

== Exhibitions ==
Under her maiden name she was represented by a still life at the municipal exhibition of living masters in Musis Sacrum in Arnhem in 1905. At the end of 1906 a small fish still life by her hung in an exhibition at Pulchri Studio. In 1907 she showed a painting of petunias at the municipal exhibition of living masters in the Stedelijk Museum Amsterdam, and in 1910 three oil still lifes at a show of Dutch masters at the Könyves Kálmán Szalon in Budapest. In 1913 she took part in the exhibition De Vrouw 1813–1913 (The Woman 1813–1913) in Amsterdam, where her work was named among the pieces with flowers and fruit. In the same year she showed portraits and studies of dogs at Pulchri Studio.

Between 1927 and 1931 she had solo exhibitions at Huize Van Hasselt (1927), at Gerbrands (1928), in the Groote Sociëteit in Enschede (early 1929) and at Pulchri Studio (June 1929 and June 1931). In February 1930 her work was shown together with that of Kees van Waning in the studios on Van Aerssenstraat, and in 1933 at Huis van Oudheusden. By mid-October 1935, four bird pieces had been sold at her exhibition on Zeestraat.

In May 1938 the jury of a competition held by Arti et Amicitiae and made possible by the De Kindervrienden foundation awarded her first prize for a work depicting motherhood. At the end of 1939 the state bought a painting by her at the exhibition Onze kunst van heden (Our Art of Today) in the Rijksmuseum in Amsterdam. In 1978 the art dealer Jan van Waning organised the exhibition Van Waning exposeert Van Wanings (Van Waning exhibits Van Wanings) in Rotterdam, with work by her, her husband Kees van Waning and Martin van Waning.

== Reception ==
In 1927 the reviewer of Voorwaarts found that her fish were correctly rendered in appearance, but that the glass of the aquarium could be felt everywhere, and that her work largely lacked the breath of life found in that of Dijsselhof. Jos de Gruyter regarded her in 1928 above all as a painter of flowers, at her best when she painted outdoors; he thought her aquariums and birds weaker. Just Havelaar called her work very uneven in 1929: in her bird paintings the form was sometimes weak, but in her good work he saw a gifted colourist. In 1931 De Gruyter thought that two flower pieces painted outdoors were among her best work, but also saw her at her strongest in some aquariums with fish; he thought less of the bird pieces. In 1935 he wrote that, if his memory did not deceive him, her manner of painting had become looser and freer, and her colour better.

== Gallery ==
Goudvissen en sluierstaarten (Goldfish and veiltails), before 1943

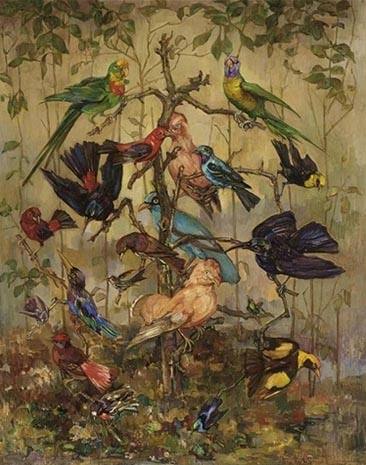
Vogels van diverse pluimage (Birds of various plumage), before 1943

Bird, before 1943

Stilleven met Chinese zoutpot en perziken (Still life with Chinese salt pot and peaches), before 1943

Stilleven met vis en uien (Still life with fish and onions), before 1943

Newspaper item on her prize-winning entry for the competition of Arti et Amicitiae and De Kindervrienden, Algemeen Handelsblad, 20 May 1938
