= Koninklijke Academie voor Beeldende Kunsten =

Koninklijke Academie voor Beeldende Kunsten, or Royal Academy of Visual Arts refers to a 19th-century name for one of two art schools in the Northern Netherlands:

- Rijksakademie, an old art school in Amsterdam dating back in various forms to the 18th century
- Royal Academy of Art, The Hague, an old school first founded in the 19th century as part of an artist collective there
