= Pierre Kleykamp =

Belgian designer

Pierre Armand Kleykamp
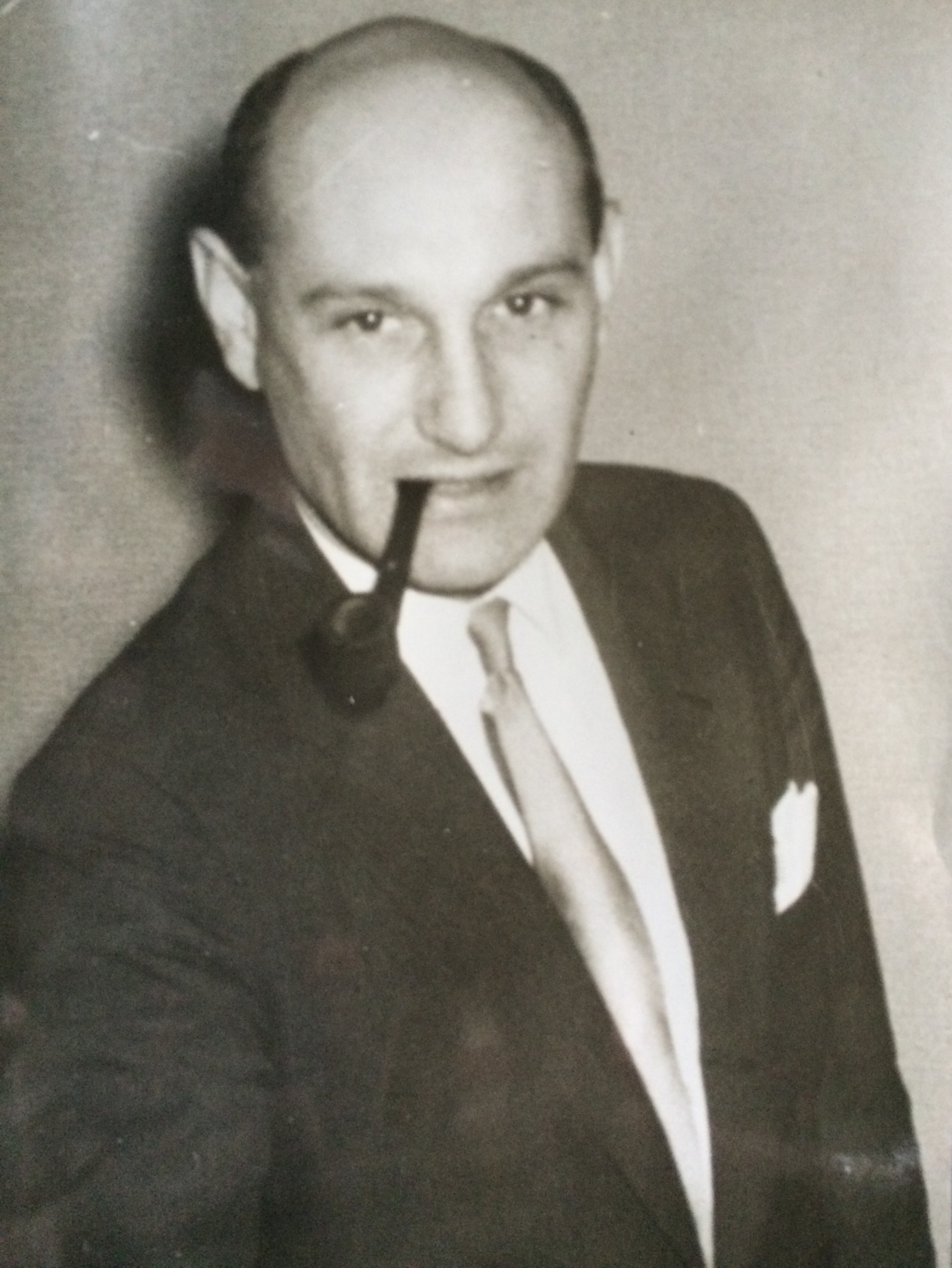
- Born: 30 January 1921; Brussels, Belgium
- Died: 10 June 1984 (aged 63); St. Thomas, Virgin Islands
- Occupation: Fabric designer
- Spouse: Ottoline Geertruyd Steens Zijnen (married 1945 - divorced 1970)
- Parent(s): Cornelis Gabriel Kleykamp, Louise Marie Jeanne Joos

Pierre Armand Kleykamp (January 30, 1921 - June 10, 1984) was a Modern furniture, interior, graphic, textile, product designer and teacher. Born in Belgium of Dutch nationality, he became a U.S. citizen in 1954. His clients included KLM (Royal Dutch Airlines), Holland America Line, Aetna Life Insurance, the United Nations. He supplied furniture to the Goed Wonen Groep and crafted several pieces for the interior of Schiphol Airport's International Departure Hall.

== Early life ==
Kleykamp was born on January 30, 1921, in Brussels, Belgium, to Cornelis Gabriel Kleykamp and his Belgian wife Louise Marie Jeanne Joos. He moved with his parents to The Hague, Netherlands, home of his father and paternal grandparents, Pieter and Ermina Kleykamp, founders of the well-known art gallery Koninklijke Kunstzaal Kleykamp.

During World War II Kleykamp studied Interior and Furniture Design at the Royal Academy of Art in The Hague.

== Career ==
After graduation in 1945 he joined Dutch designers Wim den Boon and Hein Stolle as a partner in their design firm "Groep &," located in Rotterdam. Their projects included furniture design for Goed Wonen Groep and the interior design of the international departure hall at Schiphol Airport, Amsterdam. Kleykamp, along with his partners and H. Ritter and Willy Nuys, was a member of Werkgroep Nieuwe Architectuur, The Hague.

In 1946 Kleykamp was retained by the cruise line Holland America Line to provide advice on the restoration of their flagship Nieuw-Amsterdam and to design the ship's movie theater. Kleykamp participated in the exhibition "Den Haag Bouwt Op," at the Gemeentemuseum, The Hague, December 24, 1946 – January 26, 1947.

In 1949 Kleykamp emigrated to the US with his wife and two daughters. He was sponsored by Knoll Associates for whom he initially worked in New York City. The following year he began teaching architecture at Cooper Union. In the summer of 1950 he and fellow-architect William Hunt Diederich were top prize winners in the Chicago Tribune's "Fourth Annual Better Rooms Competition. The following year Kleykamp continued freelance work while simultaneously working briefly as a draftsman at Raymond Loewy, NYC; for George Nelson, NYC; and continuing to teach at Cooper Union.

Kleykamp became Head of the Interior Design Department at the short-lived Jamesine Franklin School of Professional Arts, NYC from 1951-52. He followed this by teaching Interior Design, Art and Architecture in the Adult Education program at New York University, as well as designing fabrics for Arundell Clarke (Flags and Flags, Stroom Draaden), L. Anton Maix (1:30 A.M., Infinity), Silkar, Creative Looms and Dan Cooper, all located in NYC. His textile 1:30 A.M. was included in the Museum of Modern Art's Exhibition Good Design in 1953. His textile designs were included in Life magazine's November 1, 1954 issue ("Mathematics by the Yard," p. 94).

Kleykamp's graphic design work was featured as the covers of Interiors Magazine January, 1951 and January 1953. Both were selected by the American Institute of Graphic Artists as among the 50 best of the year. The summer of 1953 he designed a studio for a private client in Southport, Maine. It was featured in the January, 1954 issue of Interiors ("Triangular Studio Attached to a Trailer").

He became visiting professor of design at New York University, and assistant professor of design at the University of Pennsylvania.

His fabric design Stroom Draaden appeared in the 1956 book Design by the Yard – Textile Printing 800 to 1956, published in NY by The Cooper Union Museum for the Arts and Decoration. He received a silver medal in 1958 from the United Nations for his design work in the UN pavilion at the Brussels World's Fair (Expo 58).

In 1959 Kleykamp took the position as Head of the Industrial Design Department at the Rhode Island School of Design, which he held until 1963. In 1962 he created a design firm in Providence with colleague Jack MacDonald, called Kleykamp and MacDonald Associates. Corporate clients included ITT Royal, Westplex Corp., American Tube & Controls, Print Council of America and Swift Instruments, Inc..

== Timeline ==
- 1948 Designed KLM passenger restaurant and lounge at Schiphol Airport in Amsterdam, the Netherlands
- 1949 February 23, arrival in U.S.
- 1949 – 1950 Designer at Knoll Associates in New York City
- 1950 Began teaching architecture at Cooper Union in NYC
- 1950 – 1951 Worked for three weeks as an intern draftsman at Raymond Loewy in NYC and three months at George Nelson in NYC, while also at Cooper Union and doing freelance work
- 1951 January cover of Interiors magazine
- 1951 – 1952 Head of Interior Design Department at Jamesine Franklin School of Professional Arts (private school on Park Avenue in NYC, now defunct). Included in "Modernist Fabrics," American Fabrics, Winter 1951–52, No. 2
- 1952 – 1955 Taught Adult Education classes at the New School, NYC (Interior design, art & architecture). Also designing fabrics for Arundelle Clarke, L. Anton Maix, Silkar, Creative Looms, Dan Cooper (all in NYC)
- 1953 January cover of Interiors magazine
- 1953 Exhibition: "Good Design," Museum of Modern Art, NYC (Drapery fabric: "Stroom draaden")
- 1954 January Interiors magazine article: "Triangular Studio Attached to a Trailer." November 1 Life Magazine article: fabric included in "Mathematics by the Yard" (p. 94). Became a U.S. citizen on November 11
- 1955 – 1958 Lived with family in Princeton, NJ and commuted to work in NYC and Philadelphia. Taught at University of Pennsylvania as an assistant professor of Design and at New York University as a visiting professor of Design
- 1956 Exhibition: Design by the Yard, Textile Printing 800 to 1956 at Cooper Union Museum for the Arts of Decoration ("Stroom draaden")
- 1957 Redecorated World Theater in Philadelphia, PA
- 1958 Recipient of silver medal from the United Nations for his part in the United Nations' exhibit at the 1958 World's Fair in Brussels, Belgium
- 1959 – 1963 Chairman, Division of Industrial Production and associate professor of Industrial Design, Rhode Island School of Design in Providence, RI
- 1962 Founding partner in new firm: Associated Designers in Providence, RI. Made Chairman, National Screening Committee on Fulbright Awards for Study of Industrial Design in September
- 1963 – 1970(?) Principal at Kleykamp & MacDonald Associates in Providence, RI
- 1974 – 1984 Resident of the Caribbean (Grenada, St. Thomas)

== Names and producers of fabrics designed by Pierre Kleykamp ==
Flags and Flags (c.1952, Arundell Clarke); Stroom draaden (1953, Arundell Clarke); 1:30 a.m. (1953, L. Anton Maix, Inc.); Infinity (nd. L. Anton Maix)

== Articles ==
- "Drie Hagenaars in Amerika's Reclamewereld," by Robert Kiek, in magazine Ariadne.

== Personal life ==
Kleykamp married fellow art student Ottoline Geertruyd Steens Zijnen on September 12, 1945, in The Hague. They had two daughters, Marie Louise (nicknamed Loulou, born August 10, 1946) and Gabrielle (nicknamed Gaby, born November 8, 1947). Both were born in The Hague. Kleykamp became a U.S. citizen in 1954. From 1955 to 1958 Kleykamp lived with his family in Princeton, New Jersey.

The family spent many summers in Southport, Maine, where Kleykamp enjoyed designing posters for boat excursions given by his friends the Captains Dave and Marion Dash. He also designed the burgee for the Southport Yacht Club. Kleykamp and his wife divorced in 1970. In 1974 Kleykamp moved to the Caribbean (Granada and St. Thomas). He died of cancer in St. Thomas, Virgin Islands, on June 10, 1984.

== Sources ==
- "Life by Design". SEGD.
