= Marcel van Eeden =

Dutch draftsman

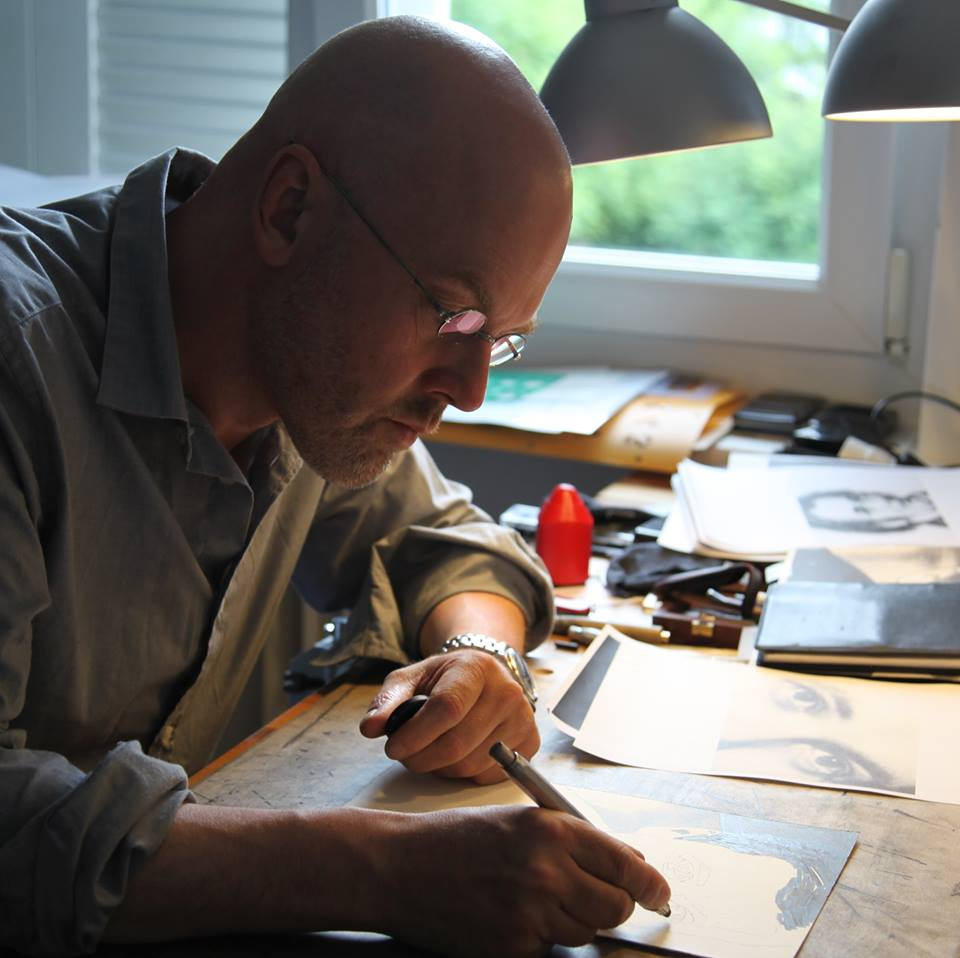
Marcel van Eeden

Marcel van Eeden (born 22 November 1965, in The Hague, Netherlands) is a Dutch draftsman and painter. From 1989 to 1993 van Eeden studied painting at the Royal Academy of Art in The Hague. Van Eeden lives and works in Zurich and The Hague. Characteristically, van Eeden's work is reminiscent of the film-noir period, of almost photo-realistic depictions and he manipulates the use of the black and white contrast. A wider audience was introduced to his work after his contribution to the Berlin Biennale in 2006.

== Works ==
Marcel van Eeden is primarily recognised for his drawings, for which he mainly works with charcoal pencils, however he also uses coloured pencils or water-colour paint. The majority of the drawings have a 19 cm x 28 cm / 7,5" x 11" format. Van Eeden produced a drawing everyday from 2001 to 2007, which he published daily onto his blog. In 2007, he concluded the blog and returned for the first time since his studies to painting, however he does continue to draw. Van Eeden's paintings, as well as his drawings, utilise a variety of templates, which are all taken from the years before his date of birth, 1965. Van Eeden calls this project "The Encyclopedia of my Death". The templates include photographs, exhibition catalogues, newspaper clippings, magazines and illustrations or even cloth patterns. Many of the works show nocturnal urban scenes, fires, abstract shapes and patterns as well as short excerpts of stencilled texts. By focussing on the virtually infinite time span before his birth, van Eeden accepts his own existence as a merely insignificant part of a genuine time stream and discards the finiteness of his own existence.

Van Eeden assembles both his paintings and drawings in the same manner; in both mediums, he pursues a picturesque approach and focuses more on the images' grey tonal composition rather than the line. In this respect, he compares his work to the pastel chalk drawings of Edgar Degas.

In 2004/2005 van Eeden began to group his drawings together to form different sized series. This was inspired, amongst other things, by Robert Walser's The Walk which extended over a collection of drawings or constantly recurring characters.

The first great series to emerge from this modus was the 150 piece series „K. M. Wiegand. Life and Work“, 2006. K. M. Wiegand is a real historical botanist, whose biography can be found cited as short passages of text on the drawings. Through the combination of images, which do not necessarily have anything to do with the particular passages of text, van Eeden constructs a fictional biography for the botanist. This approach was recycled in later series', such as „Celia“, 2004–2006 and „The Archeologist. The Travels of Oswald Sollmann“, 2007 and „The death of Matheus Boryna“, 2007. The protagonists of these series', K.M. Wiegand, Celia Copplestone, Oswald Sollmann and Matheus Boryna, are featured together in the work „Witness for the prosecution“, in 2008.

== Solo exhibitions ==
- 2004: Museum Franz Gertsch, Burgdorf, Switzerland
- 2006: Celia, Kunstverein Hannover, Germany
- 2006: Museum Dhondt Dhaenens, Deurle, Belgium
- 2007: The Archaeologist - The Travels of Oswald Sollmann, Kunsthalle Tübingen, Germany
- 2008: Kunstverein Heidelberg, Germany
- 2008: The Archaeologist - The Travels of Oswald Sollmann, Centro de Arte Contemporáneo de Caja de Burgos, Spain
- 2008: Centraal Museum Utrecht, the Netherlands
- 2009: The Zurich Trial. Part 1: Witness for the Prosecution, Kunsthalle Hamburg, Germany
- 2010: Cornelia Maersk, Nederlands Fotomuseum, Rotterdam, The Netherlands
- 2010: The Sollmann Collection, Baloise Kunstforum, Basel, Switzerland
- 2010: Haus am Waldsee - Ort internationaler Gegenwartskunst, Berlin, Germany

== Group exhibitions ==
- 2004: Zeichnung vernetzt, Städtische Galerie Delmenhorst, Germany
- 2005: Gesehene Worte, Kunsthaus Langenthal, Switzerland
- 2005: Into Drawing, Contemporary Dutch Drawings, Limerick City Gallery of Art, Limerick, Ireland
- 2006: Anstoß Berlin - Kunst macht Welt, Haus am Waldsee - Ort internationaler Gegenwartskunst, Berlin, Germany
- 2006: K. M. Wiegand. Life and Work. Fourth Berlin Biennale für zeitgenössische Kunst, Berlin, Germany
- 2007: Against Time, Bonniers Konsthall, Stockholm, Sweden
- 2007: Eyes Wide Open - New to the Stedelijk Museum & The Monique Zajfen Collection, Stedelijk Museum, Amsterdam, the Netherlands
- 2007: Made in Germany, Kestnergesellschaft, Hannover, Germany
- 2008: Into Drawing - Zeitgenössische Niederländische Zeichnungen, Stiftung Museum Schloss Moyland, Bedberg-Hau, Germany
- 2008: Lügen.nirgends - Zwischen Fiktion, Dokumentation und Wirklichkeit, Ausstellungshalle zeitgenössische Kunst Münster, Germany
- 2008: Of this tale, I cannot guarantee a single word, Royal College of Art, London, England
- 2009: Compass in Hand: Selections from The Judith Rothschild Foundation Contemporary Drawings Collection, Museum of Modern Art, New York, USA
- 2009: Die Unsichtbare Hand, Städtische Galerie Delmenhorst, Germany
- 2009: Gestern oder im 2. Stock. Karl Valentin, Kunst und Komik seit 1948, Stadtmuseum München, Germany
- 2009: Grenzgänge. Junge Künstler auf der Suche nach der Moderne im 21. Jahrhundert, Kunstmuseum Wolfsburg, Germany
- 2009: Zeigen. Eine Audiotour durch Berlin von Karin Sander, Temporäre Kunsthalle Berlin, Germany
- 2010: LINIE LINE LINEA, Zeichnung der Gegenwart, Kunstmuseum Bonn, Germany

== Literature ==
- Stephan Berg (ed.): Marcel van Eeden. Celia ( in collaboration with the exhibition "Marcel van Eeden. Celia", Kunstverein Hannover, Germany 2006) Ostfildern, Germany 2006.
- Berlin-Berlinale for contemporary art/Galerie Michael Zink (ed.): Marcel van Eeden. K. M. Wiegand, Life and Work, Ostfildern, Germany 2006.
- Spieler, Reinhard: Marcel van Eeden. Drawings (in collaboration with the exhibition with Marcel van Eeden. Drawings, Museum Franz Gertsch, Burgdorf, Germany 2004), Burgdorf, Germany 2004.
- Putzke, Markus: Marcel van Eeden : tekeningen, Zeichnungen, drawings, dibujos 1993 - 2003, Nürnberg, Germany 2003.
