= Dolly Rudeman =

Dutch graphic designer (1902–1980)

Dolly Rudeman; photograph from the 1920s.

Dolly Rudeman (born Gustave Adolphine Wilhelmina Rüdemann, 3 February 1902 – 26 January 1980) was a Dutch graphic designer who produced posters for some of the most famous directors and film stars of her day, including Sergei Eisenstein, Charlie Chaplin, and Greta Garbo.

Born in the Dutch East Indies (now Indonesia) to Dutch parents, her father died before she was born and her mother took the family back to the Netherlands when Rudeman was in her teens. Rudeman studied art and drawing from an early age, and in the early 1930s embarked on a career in design. Concerned that there was little financial stability in art, she turned towards the medium of poster design. In the twenties, she was the only woman designing posters for the film industry, and was a prolific designer of posters and printed programs for the Netherlands Cinema Trust.

Although work dried up during the Second World War—during which she aided Jews hiding from the occupying Nazis—she returned to poster design after the war. The 1950s have been termed her 'golden age', and during this decade she expanded into other forms of design such as for postcards, chocolate boxes, and ceramics. She never achieved the fame that she had before the war, however, and died in relative obscurity in Amsterdam in 1980.

== Early life ==
Dolly Gustave Adolphine Wilhelmina Rüdeman was born on 3 February 1902 in Salatiga, Java. She was the second child to Adolf Rudeman, a sugar factory proprietor, who died six months before Dolly's birth, and his wife, Gerardina van Elsbroek. After Adolf's death Gerardina remarried, and the family moved to Batavia, in the Dutch East Indies. By 1916 they had moved to The Hague. Rudeman had one sister, who spent much of her life in Indonesia; they had very little contact in adulthood.

Rudeman attended high school for two years before joining the Hague Drawing Institute where she studied art. She later moved to The Hague's Royal Academy of Art, where, in August 1922, she obtained a teaching certificate in drawing. A classmate of Rudeman's later recalled that most of the class "went on to be more or less unknown" and "became housewives", while Rudeman, now in her twenties, was "already riding around on a motorbike". Initially, she considered a career in portraiture, but decided against it on the grounds, as she explained some years later, that she was "not well-off, and most Dutch people consider it a scandalous waste of money to have yourself painted."

== Early career ==
Rudeman's first major work was illustrating the Dutch release of Eisenstein's Battleship Potemkin in 1926.

Rudeman enrolled at the Koninklijke Academie van Beeldende Kunsten (the Royal Academy of Art) in The Hague and studied drawing, graduating in 1922. Wanting to design posters, she travelled to England to study under the illustrator and cartoonist, Charles Exeter Devereux Crombie. In the mid-1920s, having returned to the Netherlands, she began drawing posters for the Netherlands Cinema Trust. (Note: This was the Nederlandsche Bioscoop Trust BV, a leading cinema chain in the Netherlands following World War I. It was one of a number of such chains of the period to model itself as a trust, and by the time Rudeman started working with it, it controlled eight cinemas: four in The Hague, two in Utrecht, and two in Nijmegen.) Having moved into her own studio, she taught private pupils and produced general illustrations.

Rudeman's first poster—and one of the most famous of this period, which made her name—was the "vicious Cossack" for Eisenstein's 1925 movie Battleship Potemkin. A then-unheard of 7,500 copies were printed for the film's promotion. At the time it was "virtually unheard of" for Dutch film promoters to produce a particular poster for a single show, and they often resorted to the expediency of merely painting over the titles of foreign-produced posters. Het Vaderland, a Dutch evening newspaper, published from 1869 to 1982, declared that the "designer of the poster must be of the same persuasion [gender] as the director of the film." That same year, Rudeman was offered a permanent contract with the Netherlands Cinema Trust, and so achieved financial security.

Amidst flaming red and yellow a Russian soldier crushes a naked man beneath his boots. A bayonet is fixed threateningly to his rifle. His victim helplessly clenches his fists. The Cossack appears indifferent. With his shiny boots and his rifle, he personifies the cruelty of the Tsarist regime and his bloody victim symbolises the Russian people. The soldier is drawn with beautiful, angular lines. The design is full of expression and executed in bright colours. This austere, stirring image bears a single word, The Battleship Potemkin. For the Dutch public in 1926 that was more than enough.

— Bastiaan Anink and Paul van Yperen, 2005, on Rudeman's Battleship Potemkin.

Rudeman also designed many program covers, producing about seventy between 1926 and 1927. In 1928 she left for Paris, where she worked under the painter Cassandre. The following year saw her travel to Berlin. In the course of her career she created posters for Marlene Dietrich (in Dishonored), Greta Garbo, and Asta Nielsen, comedians Charlie Chaplin (for City Lights) and Buster Keaton's The General, as well as for some who declined into obscurity, such as Dolores del Río (The Loves of Carmen and Ramona).

In 1928 Rudeman attended the International Film Exhibition at The Hague, and that same year she received a major commission to redesign the many wall paintings and lampshades at the Cinéma Palace, a movie theatre in Groningen. This was despite her complete lack of experience with interior design. The results were well received; coverage ranged from in-house, cinematic trade publications to popular women's magazines such as Het Rijk der Vrouw. The latter wrote that although the local community was "highly conservative in their taste [they] learned to appreciate her ultra-modern work." The magazine also wrote that although in post-war Europe they were "used to seeing women in men's jobs... It was a surprise... when we saw Dolly Rudeman's posters and learnt that this was the work of a woman!" The same year her poster for Charlie Chaplin's The Circus became the first poster to win the Dutch government's official seal of approval. (Note: The Dutch government was taking a close interest in this new industry: "The government sometimes considered foreign advertising to be an offence against public decency. From the spring of 1928 onwards, all photographs and posters had to be approved. This created a great demand for Dutch publicity material," and art critics saw film posters as being "commercial art for the masses.")

The Cinema Trust commissions dried up for Rudeman when Barend Lugend, from whom Rudeman had received some of her earliest commissions, left the organisation in 1929. (Note: Barend Lugend had been president of the Nederlandsche Bioscoop Trust.) Of her work until 1932, an estimated 150 posters and 70 programs remain. She continued to produce special assignments, and was exhibited as a solo artist and in group shows.

Rudeman had to work quickly in producing her posters. She had no time to actually see the films she was illustrating because her posters had to be out before the films they depicted. All she had to work with was a script scenario and sometimes a photograph of the stars. Sometimes she had to work on two or three posters per week, in addition to other work designing chocolate boxes, letterheads, packaging and magazine designs, and on one occasion, a luxury wall calendar.

Not so long ago, our stations, meadows and open wall surfaces were disflgured with ugly, tasteless advertisements. Luckily there has been a change. On all sides, people now realise the immense value of an attractive advertising poster, of a poster that is clear and speaks to the public in good colours, focusing the attention on what it was drawn for.

— Het Vaderland

=== Exhibitions ===
The first time Rudeman's work was exhibited was in a one-day exhibition on 17 October 1927 in Amsterdam. The show was a success, to such an extent that trade paper De Reclame lamented the fact that it was so short. A follow-up exhibition opened on 31 October 1927 in the Hotel Krasnapolsky.

One of the major exhibitions of her career was held in February 1931 at the White House, opposite the Peace Palace, in The Hague. This was an "extremely exclusive" gallery operating on an invitation-only basis, and had the benefit of not only promoting Rudeman and her work, but the cinema poster as a form of art in itself. Rudeman was, a contemporary commented, "mounting a courageous front against the bad taste of the film poster." Her original work was on sale for between 75 and 500 guilders .

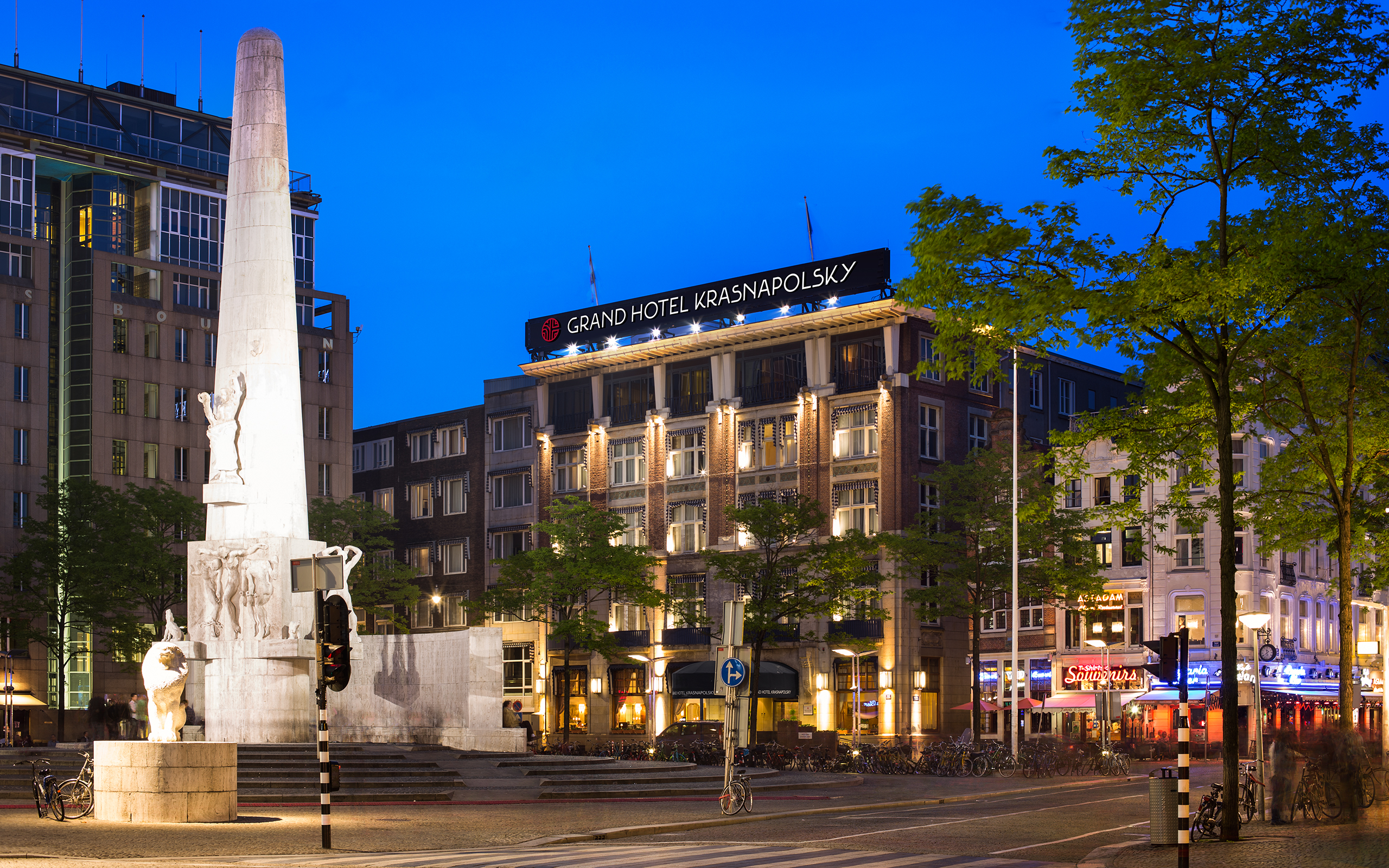
The Hotel Krasnapolsky in Amsterdam (in 2016), the site of Rudeman's second exhibition in 1927

== Post-war career and death ==
One of her last works before the outbreak of World War II was a work commissioned by the Committee for Warning Against Unilateral Disarmament. This was an evocative piece, illustrating "a pale man, symbolising the despair, fear and self-reproach of a defenceless war victim. A slipping national flag is the only thing covering his naked body. Behind him stand ruined, burning buildings." (Note: In 1925 a politically and morally conservative group of ex-army officers, industrialists, and Protestant academics and Members of Parliament had formed themselves into the Committee for Warning Against Unilateral Disarmament. Their aim was to present a counter-argument to the then-popular trend towards disarmament, as advocated by contemporary socialist (and other left-wing and liberal) parties.) During the war, poster production was halted, partly due to a lack of basic materials but also because a number of people in the industry were deported under the Nazi occupation of Holland. Rudeman continued to live in The Hague, but was forced to relocate temporarily to Amsterdam twice, in 1941 and 1944, due to allied bombing raids. The second occasion saw her remain in Amsterdam for good.

The flirtation between advertising and art, which began so promisingly, did not end up in marriage. The expectations of the partners were too different. In the course of the 20th century, advertisers acted decreasingly as patrons of the arts and focused increasingly on ensuring that the artist's advertising work contributed to additional turnover.

— Wilbert Schreurs on the decline in Rudeman's career, 1989

In Amsterdam, Rudeman lived with her cousin, Prul Rudeman. During the occupation, they took in a Jewish man named Rubens, who hid behind one of the Rudemans' cupboards when there was a police raid. They successfully kept him hidden from the Nazis until the end of the war. She stayed in touch with Lugend too, who would bring a hare for their annual Christmas meal; friends of Rudeman's from her early days at the Academy also joined them.

Rudeman's post-war career was mainly built around postcards, portraits and watercolours, as well as some posters, particularly for the K.N.M.V Motor Races. (Note: This is the Koninklijke Nederlandse Motorrijders Vereniging, or Royal Dutch Motorcyclist Association, founded in 1904.) The 1950s, in fact, have been described as Rudeman's Golden Age; she received many good commissions, and worked for Organon (in Oss) and Mulder and Zoon in Amsterdam, which further spread her work in America. Her work at this time included decals for porcelain, jugs, vases, and the like. She also contributed illustrations for picture books (not only works such as Hans Christian Andersen's Fairy Tales, but her own children's publications). Her partnership with Mulder ended in the 1970s, and Rudeman concentrated on children's portraits on private commission. She never again, however, received the national publicity and attention that she had before the war; likewise, it has been suggested, she never found the artistic freedom she wanted.

Rudeman died in Amsterdam on 21 January 1980 of pulmonary emphysema. There were no obituaries.

=== Late twentieth-century popularity ===
Although Rudeman died in relative obscurity—"and her interesting work, her hundreds of film posters, seemed lost"—towards the end of the century the Dutch film poster archives received a thorough inventory, in which many of her pieces were rediscovered. This led to renewed interest in her work and a major 1985 exhibition in the United States, The Modern Dutch Poster: The First Fifty Years, at which her Battleship Potemkin was displayed.

== Artistic style and criticism ==
Rudeman was known for her "bold, futuristic style", being both "austere and dynamic," and the influence of early German Expressionism on her work has been noted. Although constrained by being able to work only from film stills, her portrait style has been described as "exchanging realism... for a suggestive atmosphere." In 1929, contemporary journalist Kate de Ridder wrote of Rudeman's work that, whereas a female artist's work usually demonstrated a feminine touch, Rudeman's bold style was far less so. De Groene Amsterdammer described her design for Battleship Potemkin as making "a strong impression," whilst Het Vaderland, from The Hague, noted how "boldly drawn" it was, suggestive of the work of as much an artist as those who made the film itself. The same newspaper incorrectly ascribed the poster for Potemkin to a man, and corrected this in a lengthy article describing the artist and her work, in which she was called a promising young woman. Later commentators have noted the emphasis by contemporary newspapers (such as Het Vaderland) on Rudeman's youth. The same newspaper also described the film industry's advertising as "the epitome of ugliness," consisting of "gaudy sheets... overloaded with letters... clumsily drawn." In contrast, Rudeman's work made an immediate impact in the national press; her work was popularly seen as being in tune with the "modernity" of the twenties. Her style and works have been compared favourably to many of her contemporaries, including Ludwig Hohlwein, Hap Hadley in the United States and the Stenberg brothers in the Soviet Union. It has been defined as possessing three main identifying features: "good taste, a feel for colour and originality."

=== Major works ===
Rudeman herself believed she had designed over 250 film posters in her career. It has been estimated that only about half of her oeuvre has survived, of which at least 90 are extant in public and private collections. Her works include:

- The Battleship Potemkin (1925): Expressionist in style, it depicts the Odessa massacre scene.
- Spanish Evening (1926): Commissioned by the Scheveningen Sea Bathing Company to promote its resort, and starring La Argentina.
- Employment Agency for Inland Shipping (1927): Commissioned by the Dutch Ministry of Agriculture, it is possible that she deliberately used "the image language and symbolism" of socialism.
- The Circus (1928): Influenced by her time working in A. M. Cassandre's studio, she drew Chaplin's face "with as few lines as possible."
- Papitoe, Siren of the Tropics (1928): The first Hollywood film with an all-black cast; Rudeman's illustration showed the 'Black Pearl,' Josephine Baker.
- The Jazz singer (1928): Illustrated Al Johnson made up as a black minstrel.
- Wings (1928): Portrayed a "dramatic aviator in the shadow of an airplane; this earned critical acclaim even in the United States."
- Don Quichotte (1933): A portrait of the star of the film, Feodor Chaliapin, and also Rudeman's final film poster.
- Have You Got Your Celebration Skirt Yet? (1946): Her first post-liberation work, promoting the skirt designed by Elisabeth Hannema-van Maasdijk made out of scrap fabric.
