= Alida Jantina Pott =

Dutch painter

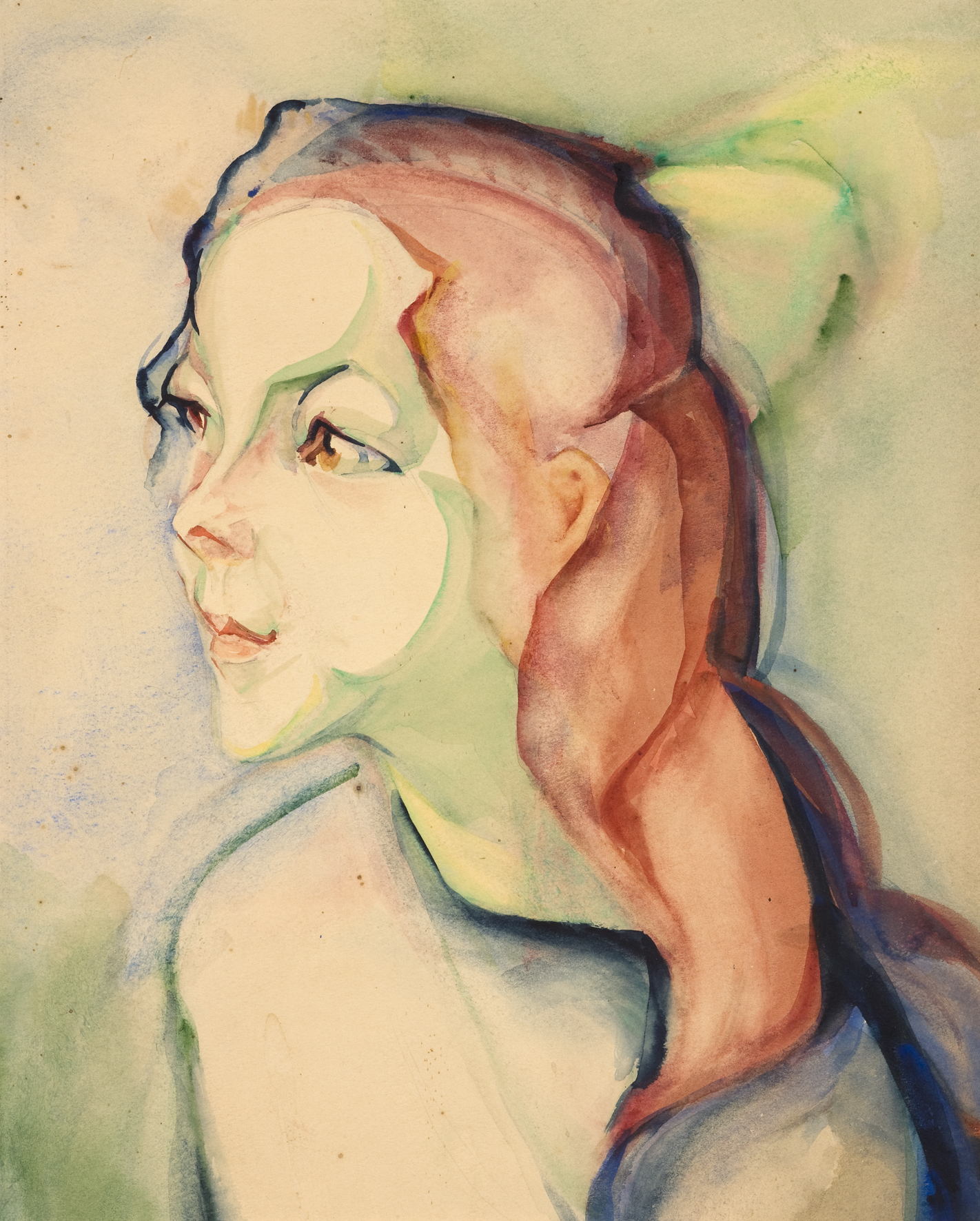
- Girl with long red hair and green bow
- Born: January 8, 1888; Groningen
- Died: 23 December 1931 (aged 43)
- Education: Minerva Academy, Hague Drawing Academy

Alida Jantina Pott (January 8, 1888, Groningen – December 23, 1931) was a Dutch visual artist and member of the Groninger art collective De Ploeg.

== Career ==
Alida Pott was born in Groningen in 1888. She was the daughter of Pieter Hendrik Pott (1858-1905), merchant and shopkeeper, and Lamberta Gerrechiena Heikens (1860-1946).

She studied at the Minerva Academy in Groningen and then at the Hague Drawing Academy. In 1912 she graduated as a drawing teacher and returned to Groningen. In 1914 she started working as a drawing teacher at the Kweekschool for teachers. She stayed with this school until 1930. In 1922 she married Gijsbert George Martens. She died of a lung disease in 1931.

== De Ploeg ==
Alida Pott was one of the first members of the artist collective De Ploeg. For the competition to design 'a simple drawing symbol' for the new association, she came up with the winning design. From 1919 a stylized P forms the logo of 'De Ploeg'. She held various board positions and was secretary from 1919 to 1921. Until 1922, she was one of the permanent representatives at the De Ploeg exhibitions in the Pictura halls or at Kunsthandel Ongering. The exhibition of the autumn of 1925 was the last one she participated in.

== Artistic style ==
Alida Pott worked in different styles, varying from precisely elaborated and traditional realism to a flat-decorative style, in which the effects of various movements of the avant-garde were visible. Pott lived in different worlds. She was so Gronings as Blauwborgje, but she also incorporated Japanese art and allowed modern tendencies in her work, even before the other Ploegers had discovered expressionism or constructivism " (Timmer, 2004, 52). She mastered virtually all techniques, but her watercolors show the most pronounced 'Pott handwriting'.

A special part of her work is formed by collages. Timmer (2004, 60-62) regards this as' a position in relation to the expressionistic wind that blew through 'De Ploeg'. Presumably she was inspired by the Dadaist collages of Kurt Schwitters.

Like many Ploegschilders, Pott was also active in the field of design and applied art. She painted wooden pins with constructivist motifs and drew designs for wall and tablecloths.

Alida Pott took a special place in 'De Ploeg'. Her work can not simply be accommodated in typical Plow expressionism or constructivism. There was, however, an exchange of ideas with her husband Georg Martens, although it is not possible to speak of a strong artistic relationship. Before that, their characters broke too much apart. With Jan Gerrit Jordens (Alida Pott was friends with his wife Jet Jordens-Luchsinger) she shared the fascination with trees. Both were interested in the linear structure of trunk and branches. (Timmer, 2004, 64)

== Legacy ==
After her death, the work of Alida Pott was kept by Georg Martens. It was only rarely seen in public in the decades that followed. In 1981 there was a large retrospective exhibition in the Fraeylemaborg in Slochteren. In the collection of the Groninger Museum are her Girl with Long Red Hair and Green Bow, Orchard Blauwborgje and the design made together with her husband for a Jurievrij exhibition of de Ploeg.
