= Kees van Waning =

Dutch painter

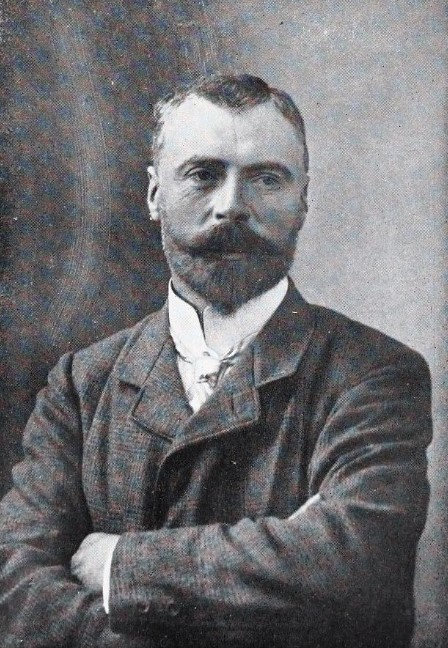
- Born: 26 July 1861; The Hague, Netherlands
- Died: 27 October 1929 (aged 68); The Hague, Netherlands
- Occupation: Painter

Kees van Waning (26 July 1861 – 27 October 1929) was a Dutch painter. His work was part of the painting event in the art competition at the 1928 Summer Olympics.

Van Waning was born in The Hague and was a student of Johannes Bosboom. In The Haque he was a member of the Pulchri Studio. In The Hague for some time he shared a studio with Floris Arntzenius, the former studio of Bernard Blommers at the Spui. In 1906 he married fellow artist Maria Christina Hendrica van Stevels (1874–1943).

Van Waning was known for his river views and seascapes. His river views showed similarities with the work of Jacob Maris and his seascapes were more in line with the work of Hendrik Willem Mesdag.

== Gallery ==
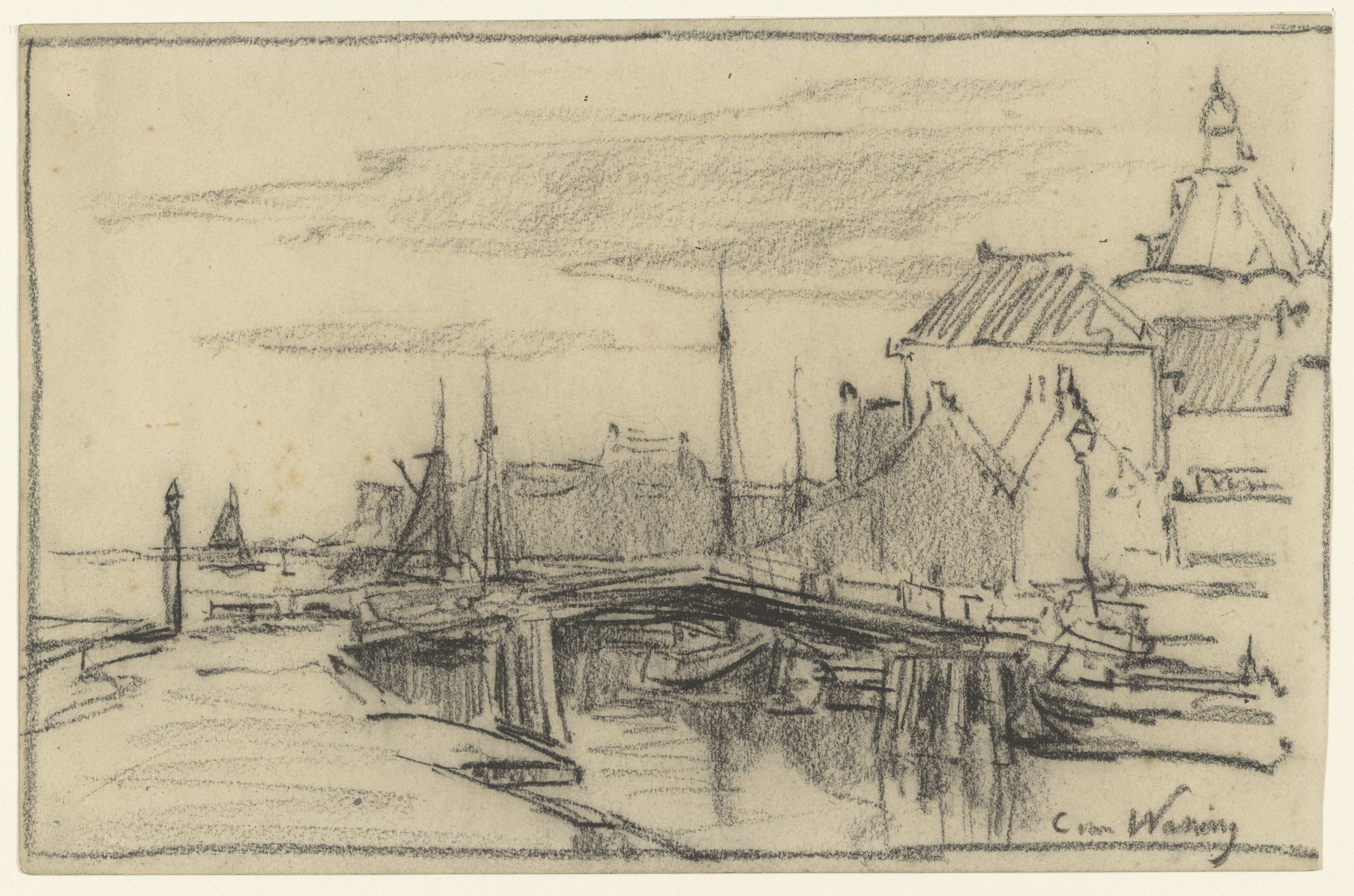

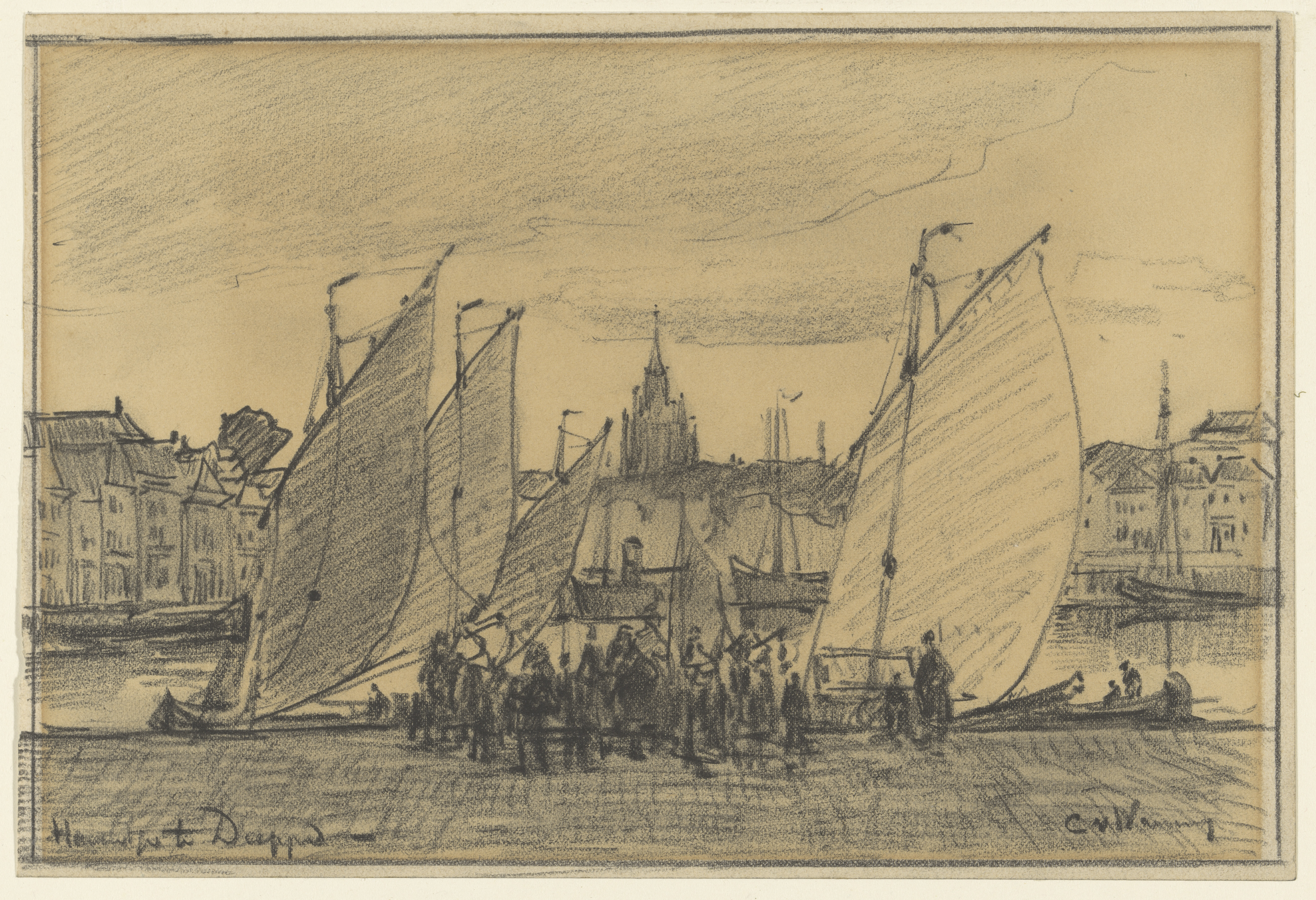

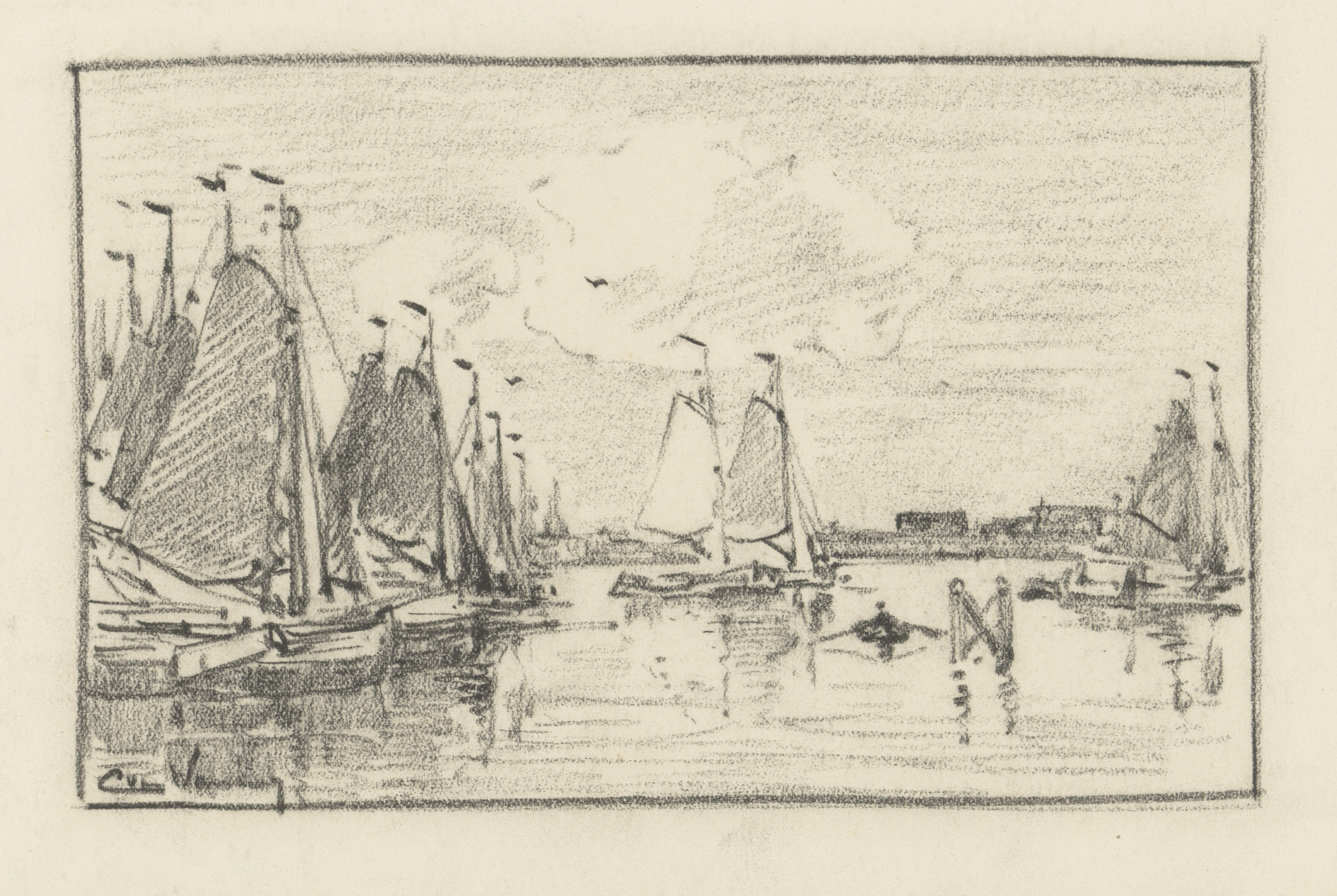

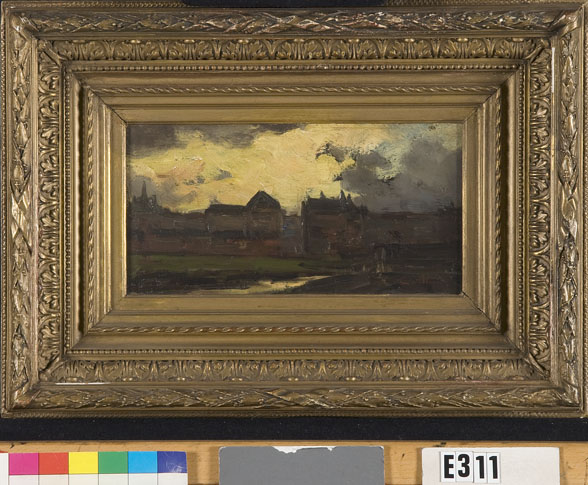

== Literature ==
- P.A. Haaxman Jr. "Cornelis Anthonie van Waning," Elsevier's geïllustreerd maandschrift, 1891. p. 146-158
