= Johfra Bosschart =

Dutch modern artist (1919–1998)

- Born: Franciscus Johannes Gijsbertus van den Berg; December 15, 1919; Rotterdam, Netherlands
- Died: November 6, 1998 (aged 78); Fleurac, France
- Education: The Academy of Fine Arts, The Hague, The Netherlands
- Movement: Centre International de l' Actualité Fantastique et Magique (Brussel)
- Spouses: Diana Vandenberg (m. 1952; div. 1970); Ellen Lórien (m. 1973)

Franciscus Johannes Gijsbertus van den Berg (15 December 1919, in Rotterdam – 6 November 1998, in Fleurac) or just Johfra Bosschart was a Dutch modern artist. Johfra and his wife, Ellen Lórien, established in Fleurac (Dordogne - France) in 1962. They lived in the Netherlands before that. Johfra described his works as "Surrealism based on studies of psychology, religion, the Bible, astrology, antiquity, magic, witchcraft, mythology and occultism."

== Early life ==
On Monday, December 15, 1919, Franciscus Johannes Gijsbertus van den Berg, called Frans, was born at 10:30 am in the Scheepstimmermanslaan in Rotterdam. Son of Franciscus Hubertus Bernardus van den Berg (Roermond 4 April 1890 – The Hague 28 December 1977) and Jeanne Bosschart (Rotterdam 3 March 1884 – The Hague 24 July 1968).

In 1922 the family moved to the Anna Paulownastraat in The Hague. During this period, he started drawing frequently. At primary school he was allowed to draw on the blackboard in the free periods.

He left primary school at the age of 12. From that moment on, he received private lessons from a great-uncle in modern languages and mathematics, to bridge the period of admission to the Academy of Visual Arts in The Hague.

At a certain moment the family moved to Wassenaar to return to The Hague just after the summer of 1938, where they moved into a house on the Van Linschotenstraat in the Bezuidenhout district.

At the age of 14, Frans followed the preparatory course still life drawing at the Academy of Visual Arts on Wednesday and Saturday afternoons. He was taught by Jan Giesen. A year later he was admitted to the day course and was taught by Henk Meijer, Paul Citroen, Willem Jacob Rozendaal, Aart van Dobbenburgh, Ahrend Hendriks, Willem Schröfer, Cees Boldingh, Dirk Harting, Sierk Schröder and George Hogerwaard, among others. During his time at the academy, he developed an interest in the work of Leonardo da Vinci. During this period, he built up friendships with, among others, Hans Kroesen and Gerard Lutz. On September 24, 1938, he started keeping a diary.

== 1940s ==
In 1940 the Second World War broke out. In that year he became proficient in etching and lithography. He got his hands on a German Nazi propaganda magazine containing an article about degenerate art. It showed a large number of illustrations of works by Max Ernst, René Magritte, André Masson, Giorgio de Chirico and many others. In 1943 he held his first exhibition, together with Hans Kroesen. Approximately 250 drawings and watercolors were exhibited. The pressure from the German occupiers during this period was increasing. He was forced into hiding to avoid being sent to work in Germany. He found shelter in Rijswijk and a few months later he went into hiding in the parental home in the Van Linschotenstraat in the Bezuidenhout district of The Hague.

From 1 March 1945, the bombing raids by the Allies on the Haagse Bos in The Hague the family to leave the parental home, they could only take a few documents - including the diaries - with them. On March 3, 1945, the parental home was completely destroyed during a bombing raid. Almost all his drawings and paintings were lost.

Shortly after the liberation of the Netherlands, on 17 July 1945, he took up residence in a courtyard house in Willemstraat in The Hague. He established himself as a painter and took the name JOHFRA. This is a combination of the first letters of his birth names FRAnsciscus JOHannes, in reverse order.

At the beginning of 1946, Johfra was introduced by his friends to an artist with the pseudonym Diavola. This was the nickname of Angèle Thérèse Blomjous (The Hague, April 1, 1923 – The Hague, October 3, 1997). Diavola eventually changes her name into Diana, goddess of the hunt. Johfra and Diana increasingly hung out with each other, and a relationship developed. In the summer of 1946, he followed Diana to Paris.

Diana worked in Paris as an au pair. In 1947 Johfra again resided in Paris, where Diana still worked. This time around they had more time for each other and visited many museums and other places of interest.

When they returned to The Hague, they moved into the attic of the apartment of Johfra's parents. In 1948 they traveled to Italy to visit Rome. Diana took him along on the various journeys the couple made to the Alps, the Dolemites, the Pyrenees, the Swiss Lakes, Florence and Venice. In this post-war period, Johfra held several solo exhibitions in the Bennewitz art gallery in The Hague.

== Working Career ==
On March 21, 1952, Johfra and Diana got married. They made plans to migrate to America and a marriage would make it easier to obtain a visa. Not much later, however, they gave up migration and decided to stay in the Netherlands. They got to know Cor Damme, one of the co-founders of the Lectorium Rosicrucianum in Haarlem. In 1953 Johfra and Diana joined the Rosicrucians. In 1954 they visited the caves of Lascaux. Furthermore, various solo exhibitions were held, not only in the Netherlands but also in Los Angeles and Cleveland (1956) and Brussels (1957). On August 7, 1959, they met Salvador Dalí in Port Lligat. In 1957 Diana introduced her friend Els de Jonge (Ellen Lórien) to Johfra. In 1961 Johfra and Diana moved into the building at Madoerastraat 7 in The Hague, but Johfra left Diana in 1962. A relationship had blossomed between Johfra and Ellen. At the end of 1962 he moved to live with Ellen in Amsterdam and the period with Diana came to a definite end. It took until 1970 for Diana to agree to a divorce.

In April 1959, Johfra and Diana Vandenberg traveled to the town of Figueras in Spain, the birthplace of Salvador Dalí. He wrote in his diary that day: "What a sad country! How does someone come to live here between a few fishermen's huts on a beach of a few tens of meters?" On August 6, 1959, Johfra and Diana visited Port Lligat again, but this time with the intention of meeting Salvador Dalí. That same afternoon they knocked on Dalí's house. They agreed to come back the next day. The next day they visited Dalí at the agreed time. Together they went to the studio where Dalí showed them some works of art in the making. They discussed a painting that Dalí calls "Les Lansas" (note: the final title is The Discovery of America by Christopher Columbus). Dalí showed what adjustments he had to make to his studio in order to realize such a large painting.

Johfra noted in his diary, "A storm of conflicting thoughts and feelings remains after our visit. I found him repulsive and sympathetic and tragic. A prisoner forced to be the figure he created himself. A victim of the world of which he is the jester, and of himself because of his boundless vanity, which makes it impossible for him to break with this situation. What I totally missed was any trace of happiness and humor."

In January 1998, Johfra wrote in his diary, "Now I think completely differently about this person (Dalí), more nuanced. If the visit could have happened now, it would have turned out very differently. But of course this always applies. It is actually never good to record things. With everything you describe, whether it concerns a case or a person, you are expressing a personal judgment. We don't even know ourselves, how could we know another? I have known Dalí's work for 55 years now and it has become a fixture in my world. Now I know a lot more about him and I see more in his work than before. Like Leonardo da Vinci (recognized by Dalí as "divine"), Dalí has had a formative effect on me. He has captivated me very much, but also very often disappointed and annoyed me, which was never the case with Leonardo, who is my spiritual father."

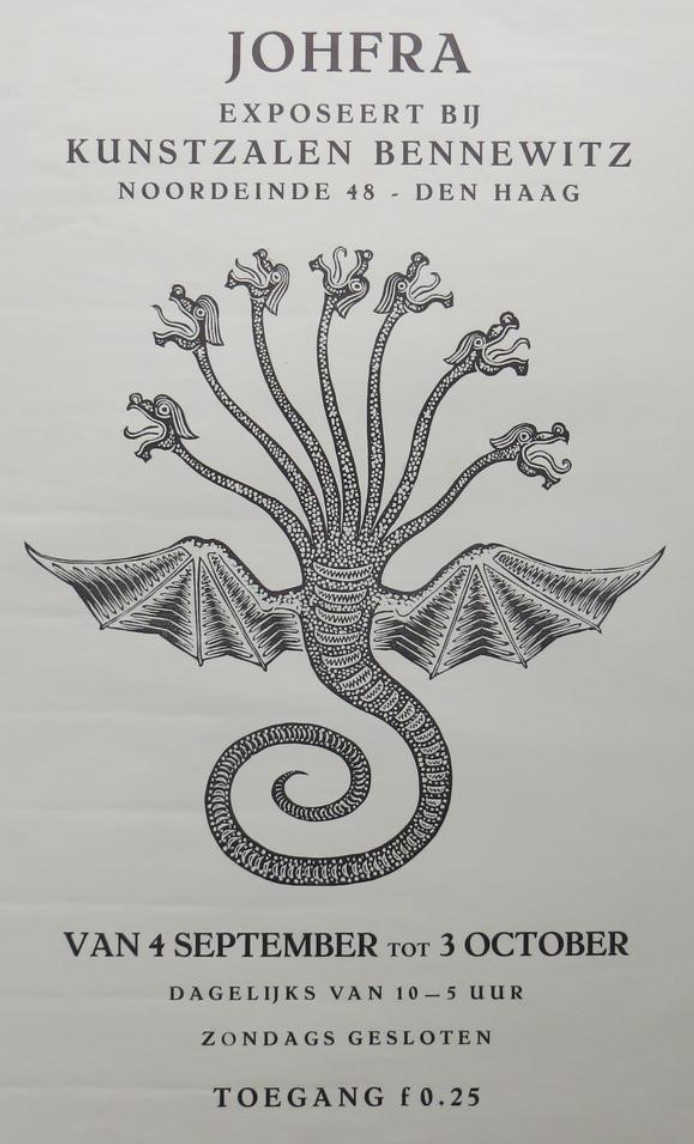
Johfra exhibition at Gallery Bennewitz in The Hague, The Netherlands 1953.

On March 20, 1953, Johfra and Diana joined the Rosicrucian Society, the Lectorium Rosicrucianum in Haarlem, a Gnostic spiritual school. They regularly visited the meetings of the Hague department, the temple services in Haarlem and the conferences in Lage Vuursche and abroad. The aim of the Mystery School is transfiguration, that is, the gradual assimilation of the personality of the "old man" into a spiritual consciousness which reunites him with the primordial divine life. During the period of association with the Lectorium Rosicrucianum, Johfra made many paintings based on the teachings and symbolism of the Rosicrucians. Together with Diana, Johfra rendered his services to the society, which had branches in various European countries, and later also in North and South America. In the 1960s, Johfra was asked to provide illustrations for the two-part work The Alchemical Wedding by Christiaan Rozenkruis.

In 1957, Diana introduced her friend Els de Jonge (Utrecht 16 March 1924 – Plazac 22 May 2016) to Johfra. She was an artist who later signed her paintings with Ellen Lórien. A relationship blossomed between Johfra and Ellen. Johfra left Diana in 1962 and went to live with Ellen in Amsterdam. After the divorce with Diana Vandenberg in 1970, Johfra and Ellen got married on May 11, 1973.

In 1963, Johfra managed to sell much of his available work to an American. With the proceedings he bought a piece of land in Aspremont in the Alpes-Maritimes department in southern France. In the following year, Johfra and Ellen traveled to Aspremont and built their first house. A few years later they built a second house, which became the main residence. For several years Johfra signed his work with Johfra Bosschart. He used his mother's last name when signing his artworks (Bosschart).

In search of a new living environment, Johfra and Ellen ended up in the Dordogne. They passed the towns of Le Moustier and La Roque-Saint-Christophe. They found an old water mill, Moulin du Peuch, not far from there, which they decided to buy. It is on the river Le Vimont between the villages of Plazac and Fleurac. During this period Johfra's work was sold through Galerie Kamp in Amsterdam. Later, Ellen's work is also sold through the same gallery.

When Walter Kamp had to close his gallery in 1983, Johfra and Ellen had to rely on the French public for sales of their artworks. In 1984 they started a gallery at home, Galerie La Licorne. Johfra and Ellen exhibited at various locations in France. At the end of the eighties, Johfra managed to bring his work to the attention of the Dutch audience again via Jester Art Galerie (Amsterdam). In the early 1990s, Jester Art Galerie went bankrupt.

Johfra wrote the following in his autobiography Symphonie Fantastique: "Ellen is the driving force and the inspiration of our community. She protects me from inner chaos. She takes care of the business contacts, because in a practical sense I am no match for this harsh society. Without her I would have been lonely a long time ago and might now be painting in an Amsterdam attic."

In 1963, Johfra got the chance to sell all his available work in one go to Mr. Greenberg, an American. With the proceeds from this sale, Johfra and Ellen Lórien bought a piece of land in Aspremont, located in the Alpes-Maritimes department in southern France. In 1964 they bought all kinds of demolition material and transported it to Aspremont. A wooden house was built from these materials. At the end of the sixties, several Johfra solo exhibitions took place, including in Paris and Cannes. Johfra and Ellen have meanwhile started building a house on their plot of land. This house was finished in 1969. In 1970 there was a Johfra solo exhibition in London. In that year, the first contact was made with Pierre Borgue, author of “Johfra, on the limits of adventure”. That year Johfra exhibited in the Netherlands, at Galerie Eijlders (Zandvoort). In 1971, the first contact followed with the Haarlem art critic Hein Steehouwer, the inventor and founder of the group of artists named Metarealists.

In December 1972, the Haarlem art critic Hein Steehouwer informed Johfra of the term Metarealism, a term with which he wanted to indicate that the spiritual world and the material world coexisted. He also talked about his idea to bring together a group of artists related to Metarealism, and to organize a touring exhibition with this group. On May 20, 1973, the group The 7 Metarealists was officially created, consisting of the artists Frans Erkelens, Johan Hermsen, Johfra, Han Koning, Victor Linford, Ellen Lórien and Diana Vandenberg. Jan Blok was appointed as manager for the group exhibitions to be held.

On May 3, 1974, the start of seven group exhibitions of the group The 7 metarealists took place. The first large group exhibition was held in the Van Reekum Gallery in Apeldoorn. At the opening, the presentation of the book The 7 Metarealists took place, along with the presentation of Johfra’s Zodiac posters. The exhibition attracted a total of 9,000 visitors. The next group exhibition took place in June 1974 in the Het Prinsenhof museum in Delft. The exhibition in Delft attracted a total of 12,000 visitors. More exhibitions followed in the Artists Center in Bergen, Het Hofje van Staats in Haarlem, Pictura in Groningen, Galerij de Ark in Boxtel and the Romi Goldmuntz Centrum in Antwerp. The total number of visitors for the seven exhibitions was 48,000. In 1976 the artists were interviewed for a television program broadcast on November 29, 1976, by the television broadcaster TROS with the title Van beroep: Fijnschilder. In December 1976, however, the first tensions arose. A disagreement arose between Hein Steehouwer and Jan Blok, the group's manager. In 1976, the group disbanded. On March 24, 1977, Hein Steehouwer died suddenly. With his death, the term Metarealism also came to an end.

In 1973, at the suggestion of the Haarlem art critic Hein Steehouwer, poster magnate Engel Verkerke conceived the idea of publishing a poster series of the twelve constellations. Steehouwer advised him to have these works made by Johfra. Verkerke concludes a contract with Johfra. The twelve paintings are made in the format 90 by 60 centimeters, which corresponded to the format of the posters to be published. The compositions of the paintings were permeated with symbolism. To ensure that the colors came out well on the posters, Johfra painted the paintings in a color scheme that was brighter than usual for him. Johfra has been working on these twelve paintings for over a year. In 1975 the Zodiac series was fully exhibited at Galerie Kamp (Amsterdam). The owner Walter Kamp purchased the twelve paintings himself. The art critics did not respond positively to Johfra's work, but the public came to look at the artworks in large numbers. The Zodiac series was accompanied by booklet written by Hein Steehouwer: Johfra en de Zodiak. At the same time, posters were also being released for other works by Johfra. Galerie Kamp organized exhibitions of which Johfra's work was part, including at the Baseler Kunstmesse. Other exhibited artists in these exhibitions included Ernst Fuchs, H.R. Giger, Salvador Dalí, Rudolf Hausner, Wolfgang Hutter, Aat Veldhoen, Diana Vandenberg and Ellen Lórien.

In 1973, Johfra and Ellen traveled through the Dordogne, to the Périgord. They pass Montignac where the cave of Lascaux is located. They followed the river Vézère and arrived at the town of Le Moustier and the prehistoric rock face, La Roque-Saint-Christophe. They decided to look for a suitable living space in this area. They visited an old water mill, Le Moulin de Peuch, in the town of Fleurac, not far from Le Moustier which they decided to buy in 1974.

The same year they first met Gallery owner Walter Kamp. Johfra showed the triptych Unio Mystica to Walter Kamp. Ellen advised Walter to buy this painting, though he decided not to. Walter Kamp later bought up the entire Zodiac series containing 12 paintings of which nine paintings were not completed at that time. This sale enabled Johfra and Ellen to refurbish and renovate the mill they were living at.

During this period in the late 1970s, various series of paintings were created, such as the Maldoror series and the Fountain series, but also the less well-known series such as the Witches' Portraits and Witches' Sabbaths. In 1979 he completed the triptych The Adoration of Pan.

In order to make the paintings for the Maldoror series, Johfra read the book The Songs of Maldoror in its entirety. In his diaries he noted, "I have made the decision and have decided not to make the seven paintings for The Songs of Maldoror. Mental hygiene is the reason." Yet he persevered and along the way he managed to express some appreciation and even became enthusiastic about the text The Songs of Maldoror. When he finished reading the book, he wrote about it in his diary: "I have finished The Songs of Maldoror. I like the sixth song the best. This book is the source of surrealism. Not André Breton but De Lautréamont is the inventor of surrealism. The images and especially the style of writing of Salvador Dalí are entirely derived from this book, as are his attitude and mentality. The surrealists have not been able to do much more than what De Lautréamont has done. The movement only expanded and popularized it." Johfra finalized the series of paintings The Songs of Maldoror in 1978. The size of each painting was 120 by 90 centimeters. Publisher Verkerke published posters of several of these paintings. The Maldoror series was exhibited at Galerie Kamp (Amsterdam) from April 29 to May 31, 1978, together with work by a number of other artists. In July of that year, these artworks were exhibited at the Baseler Kunstmesse.

Between 1980 and 1982, Johfra worked on a second poster series commissioned by Engel Verkerke with Fantastic Beasts as the focus subject: unicorn, faun, sphinx, Gorgons, centaur, dragon, hydra, griffin, Bacchus, harpies, sirens, seahorses, phoenix, basilisk, Pan, Pegasus, triton; 17 pieces in total.

In 1989, the booklet Elfes, fées et gnomes was published, in which work by Johfra, Ellen Lórien and Carjan (Car Verheul) was depicted. In 1990, the filmmaker Robin Lutz (the son of his former academy friend Gerard Lutz) came to France. He made a film about the work of Johfra and Ellen. The film titled De Wereld van Johfra was broadcast on 14 May 1991 by television broadcaster TROS and showed Johfra in his house in the Périgord. In 1994 and 1995, the Ellen in Wonderland series was created, a total of nine paintings in which Ellen Lórien played the leading role.

== Death ==
In 1998 Johfra was diagnosed with colon cancer. On May 31, 1998, he finished his last painting titled Homecoming. Johfra died on November 6, 1998, at 2:30 am.

After his death, the De Verbeelding Foundation was established and posthumously published the book Highest lights and deepest shadows, written by Gerrit Luidinga. It contained many images from Johfra's oeuvre as well as passages from his diary in twenty volumes (from 1938 to 1998) of a total of about six thousand pages.

== Books ==
- (Johfra) van den Berg, Franciscus Johannes Gijsbertus; Gerrit Luidinga; Bureau Van Tilburg (1998). Symphonie fantastique : autobiografie (in Dutch). Woerden: De Verbeelding. ISBN 90-804422-1-6.
- Gerrit Luidinga. Johfra: Hoogste lichten en diepste Schaduwen. Een kunstenaarsleven in woord en beeld (1919-1998) (in Dutch). Woerden 2002: Stichting De Verbeelding.
- Hein Steehouwer. 7 meta-realisten, symboliek bij Nederlandse schilders.
- Rico Bulthuis. Johfra. The Hague 1956: L.J.C. Boucher.
- (Johfra) van den Berg, Franciscus Johannes Gijsbertus. Astrologie. De tekens van de dierenriem. Amsterdam 1981: In den Toren.
- B. Van Doorn. Schetsboek van Johfra. The Hague 1978: Omniboek.
- Hein Steehouwer. Johfra en de zodiak. Deventer 1975: Ank Hermes.
