= Maura Biava =

Italian visual artist

- Born: Maura Biava; 1970 (age 55–56); Italy
- Known for: Photography, drawing, ceramics, sculpture, installation
- Website: maurabiava.com

Maura Biava (born 1970, Italy) is an Italian visual artist

based in Amsterdam, who works across photography, drawing, ceramics, sculpture, and installation.

== Background ==
Maura Biava was born in Reggio Emilia, in 1970. Biava earned her degree from the Brera Academy, in 1992. She studied at the Rijksakademie in Amsterdam, from 1997 to 1999.

Her photography, drawings, and ceramics are inspired by nature and mathematics. Biava's works are represented in collections, including the Stedelijk Museum Amsterdam, the Museum De Domijnen in Sittard, the Fort bij Vijfhuizen in Vijfhuizen, the AkzoNobel Art Foundation in Arnhem, and De Nederlandsche Bank in Amsterdam.

Since 2005, she has taught at the Royal Academy of Art, The Hague.

== Selected exhibitions ==
=== Solo ===
- 2024: in-form-azione, International Museum of Ceramics, Faenza, Italy
- 2024: Escher in the Palace, The Hague, The Netherlands
- 2022: Nature * Patterns, Gallery Caroline O'Breen, Amsterdam, The Netherlands
- 2021: Spinning the stars, museum BAZ, The Hague, The Netherlands
- 2019: Zero & Five, Galerie Caroline O'Breen, Amsterdam, The Netherlands
- 2016: Form Informed, book launch & exhibition of prints at Printed Matter
- 2014: Hypotrochoid of Albrecht Dürer & Apion of Giordano Riccati, Envoy Enterprises (hosted by Torch gallery), Amsterdam, The Netherlands
- 2013: Museo Carlo Zauli, Faenza, Italy
- 2011: Scintillascopy, Maura Biava & Dike Blair, Cascina Cuccagna, Milan, Italy
- 2007: Doride/Ultramarine, Maura Biava & Elspeth Diederix, Photo Museum, Amsterdam, The Netherlands
- 2001: Levanto, Bahnwärterhaus, Galerien der Stadt Esslingen, Esslingen am Neckar, Germany
- 1996: Medusa & Delfina, Galleri Nicolaï Wallner, Copenhagen, Denmark

=== Group ===
- 2024: Luminous Reveries, Gallery Dotwalk, Travancore Palace, New Delhi, India
- 2024: Experimentumcrucis III, Ex Caserma Cassonello, Noto, Italy
- 2021: All'ombra del... Contemporary Art project Villa Iblea, Sicila, Italy
- 2020: The Natural, Galerie Caroline O'Breen, Amsterdam, The Netherlands
- 2017: Ecovention Europe, Museum Contemporary Art De Domijnen, Sittard, The Netherlands
- 2016: Dalla cellula all'universo-dall'atomo al bit, Triennale Expo Gate, Milano, Italy
- 2015: Data Clay, Museum of Design, San Francisco, California, USA
- 2014: Raving Disco Dolly on A Rock 'n Roll Trolley, Envoy gallery, New York, USA
- 2006: Gimme Shelter, Halle Fur Kunst, Luneburg, Germany
