= Philip Vermeulen =

Dutch 21st-century artist

- Born: 1986 (age 39–40)
- Education: Royal Academy of Art, The Hague (BA ArtScience, 2017)
- Occupation: Artist
- Website: www.philipvermeulen.com

Philip Vermeulen (born 1986) is a Dutch artist based in The Hague whose large-scale installations combine kinetic art, sound art, light art, and audiovisual experimentation. His work Boem BOem (English: Boom BOom) was shown at Museum Voorlinden in 2023, and in 2024 he presented his first solo museum exhibition, Chasing The Dot, at the Rijksmuseum Twenthe. In 2026 he premiered Chasing the Dot: Ganzfeld = Wavefield at Lowlands Festival, a work made in collaboration with Kunstmuseum Den Haag and later shown there in the collection presentation KM (Nieuwe) Iconen.

== Biography ==
Vermeulen studied at the Royal Conservatory of The Hague and graduated summa cum laude from the Royal Academy of Art, The Hague in 2017.

Rijksmuseum Twenthe was the first museum to acquire a work by Vermeulen, buying 10 Meters of Sound in 2018. In 2020 he was nominated for the Volkskrant Visual Art Prize, and his installation More Moiré² was nominated for a Golden Calf in the Best Interactive category at the Netherlands Film Festival.

His installation Boem BOem was displayed at Museum Voorlinden from 11 February to 5 March 2023. The work launches tennis balls towards sound boxes; it is built on a modified baseball pitching machine fitted with a computer-controlled solenoid, and the balls rebound off two panels back into the machine and wear out so quickly that more than a hundred are used each day. For the Voorlinden presentation Vermeulen calculated that the machine would fire the balls 152,066 times in total. Reviewing the work in Het Parool, Kees Keijer related it to the aesthetic of the sublime, and Vermeulen described the appeal of the tension between attraction and repulsion in the piece. Boem BOem was previously known as the Physical Rhythm Machine and originated as his 2017 graduation work.

In 2024 the Rijksmuseum Twenthe in Enschede presented Chasing the Dot, Vermeulen's first solo museum exhibition, which ran from 28 June 2024 to 5 January 2025 and brought together six works across eight rooms, three of them made for the exhibition. For the show the museum's galleries were lined with black insulation material and linked by soundproof locks so that the works would not carry over into one another. In a four-star review in de Volkskrant, Sarah van Binsbergen described the title installation, in which a coloured dot appears to sit behind the viewer's retina and moves with the head, as a "trip", and quoted Vermeulen saying "Ik zoek de gekte op" ("I seek out the madness").

Vermeulen calls his installations hypersculptures. They work with speed, rhythm and physical force, from soft materials moving so fast they appear suspended in the air, as in Flap Flap (2018), to installations in which white light breaks into separate colours through rapid rotation, as in Fanfanfan (2019). He works with the perceptual phenomenon of synaesthesia, which his installations both stimulate and disorient. Vermeulen has said that addiction is a recurring theme in his work, and in NRC he spoke about his own history of addiction.

Vermeulen's work is discussed in the book A Critical History of Media Art in the Netherlands by Sanneke Huisman and Marga van Mechelen. In 2026 his first monograph, From Off to On: Philip Vermeulen's HyPeRRR-ScULpTUressss, edited by Louise Bjeldbak Henriksen, was published by nai010 publishers in collaboration with Kunstmuseum Den Haag.

== Selected exhibitions ==
=== Solo ===
- 2026 – Chasing the Dot: Ganzfeld = Wavefield, Lowlands Festival, Biddinghuizen
- 2026 – Chasing the Dot, part of KM (Nieuwe) Iconen, Kunstmuseum Den Haag
- 2024 – Chasing The Dot, Rijksmuseum Twenthe, Enschede
- 2023 – Boem BOem, Museum Voorlinden, Wassenaar
- 2021 – Verbógen Verbrijzeld, W139, Amsterdam
- 2020 – More Moiré², Stedelijk Museum Amsterdam (Sonic Acts)
- 2018 – Boem BOem, CTM Festival, Berlin

=== Group ===
- 2025–2026 – 10 Meters of Sound, Stilte in de Storm, Museum Voorlinden
- 2025 – RrrrRrrr, Cobra Museum, Amstelveen
- 2022 – Ocular Drift, Schurend Paradijs, Kunsthal KAdE, Amersfoort
- 2022–2023 – HYPERsculptures, Zentrum für Internationale Lichtkunst, Unna
- 2018 – Ars Longa, Vita Brevis, Rijksmuseum Twenthe, Enschede
- 2017 – Boem BOem, Ars Electronica, Linz

== Collections ==
- Rijksmuseum Twenthe – 10 Meters of Sound (acquired 2018), You Are Here (2024)
- Museum Voorlinden – 10 Meters of Sound
- Kunstmuseum Den Haag – Chasing the Dot (2026)

== Publications ==
- From Off to On: Philip Vermeulen's HyPeRRR-ScULpTUressss, ed. Louise Bjeldbak Henriksen, nai010 publishers, 2026
- A Critical History of Media Art in the Netherlands, Sanneke Huisman and Marga van Mechelen, Jap Sam Books, 2019
