= Paul Schuitema =

Dutch artist and designer (1897–1973)

- Born: Geert Paul Hendrikus Schuitema; 27 February 1897; Groningen, Netherlands
- Died: 25 October 1973 (aged 76); Wassenaar, Netherlands
- Known for: Typography, industrial design

Geert Paul Hendrikus Schuitema (Dutch pronunciation: [ɣeːrt pʌul ɦɛnˈdrikʏs ˈsxœytəmaː]; 27 February 1897 – 25 October 1973) was a Dutch graphic artist. He also designed furniture and expositions and worked as photographer, film director, and painter, and as a teacher of 'publicity design' at the Royal Academy of Art in The Hague.

== Industrial design ==
Schuitema studied at the Academie voor Beeldende Kunsten in Rotterdam. In the 1920s, he began to work on graphic design, applying the principles of De Stijl and constructivism to commercial advertising. Along with Gerard Kiljan and his famous colleague Piet Zwart, he followed ideas pioneered in the Soviet Union by El Lissitzky and Rodchenko, in Poland by Henryk Berlewi and in Germany by Kurt Schwitters.

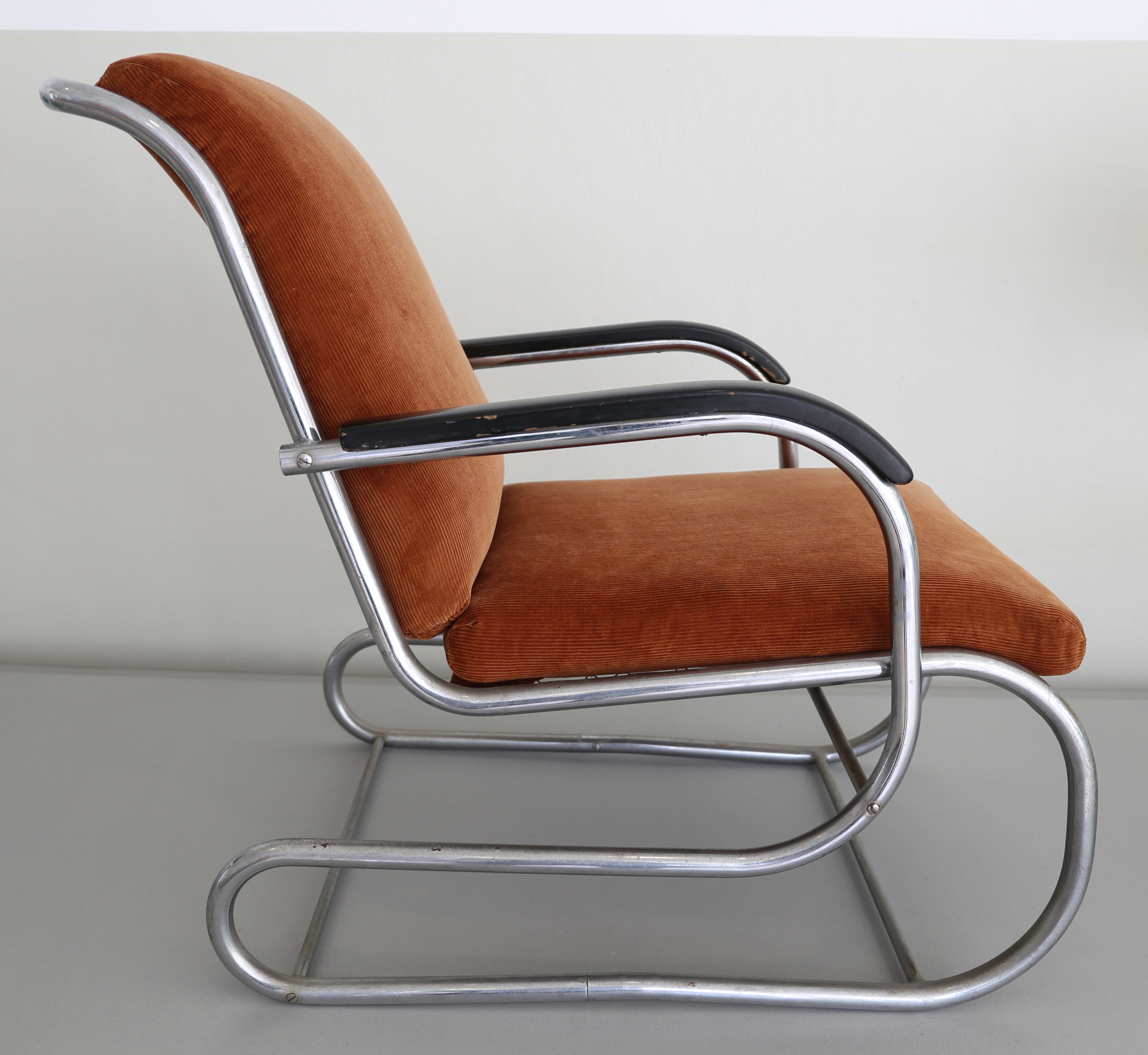
Chair no. 55, 1932

During his employment at the NV Maatschappij Van Berkel Patent scale company in Rotterdam, Schuitema gained recognition for his original designs of stationery and publicity material, often using only the colors black, red and white and bold sans serif fonts. From 1926 on, he started working with photomontages, becoming one of the pioneers of this technique in the field of industrial design. Schuitema was a member of Nederlandsche Vereeniging voor Ambachts- en Nijverheidskunst (V.A.N.K.) the Dutch Association for Craft and Craft Art.

Even though he was a convinced socialist and often designed leftist publications directed at industrial workers, Schuitema also worked for major companies, such as Philips.

== Filmmaking ==
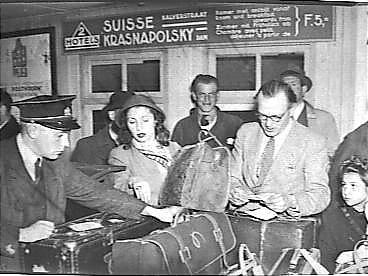
Paul Schuitema with Chaja Goldstein, after filming Partizanenlied in Paris (Schiphol, 1946)

In the late 1920s, Schuitema became interested in film. Among his first film studies are De Graf Zeppelin in Nederland (1932), and Betogingen (1932). In 1934 he made The Market Halls of Paris, a film in the spirit of the city symphonies, just like his main project, De Maasbruggen, shot in Rotterdam. While Schuitema had started to work on this film in 1932, it was finished in 1937, and only released in 1946, as Les Ponts de la Meuse at the Cannes Film Festival. After World War II, he would make several other films.

During the final years of World War II, Schuitema, along with Jan Bouman, Lou Lichtveld and Eduard Verschueren, began planning for the post-war art community in the Netherlands. In 1944, the four publish a "Report on Stimulation, Development and Organization of the Film Industry in the Netherlands" (Rapport inzake de stimuleering, ontwikkeling en ordening van het Filmwezen in Nederland).

Following Dolle Dinsdag (5 September 1944), he officially joined the resistance forces, assuming a leadership role in the National Film and Photo Reportage Service. After the end of the war, Schuitema and his three partners founded the Dutch Cooperative for Film Production (Nederlandse Werkgemeenschap voor Filmproductie, NWF) in Haarlem and gave the impulse for the formation of the Dutch Film Makers Guild (Beroepsvereniging van Nederlandse Cineasten). In each case, membership was restricted to those artists whose conduct during the occupation was irreproachable.

== Influence ==
His techniques influenced the Wild Plakken design collective of the late 20th century.
