= Royal Academy of Art, The Hague =

Art school in The Hague, Netherlands

- Koninklijke Academie van Beeldende Kunsten
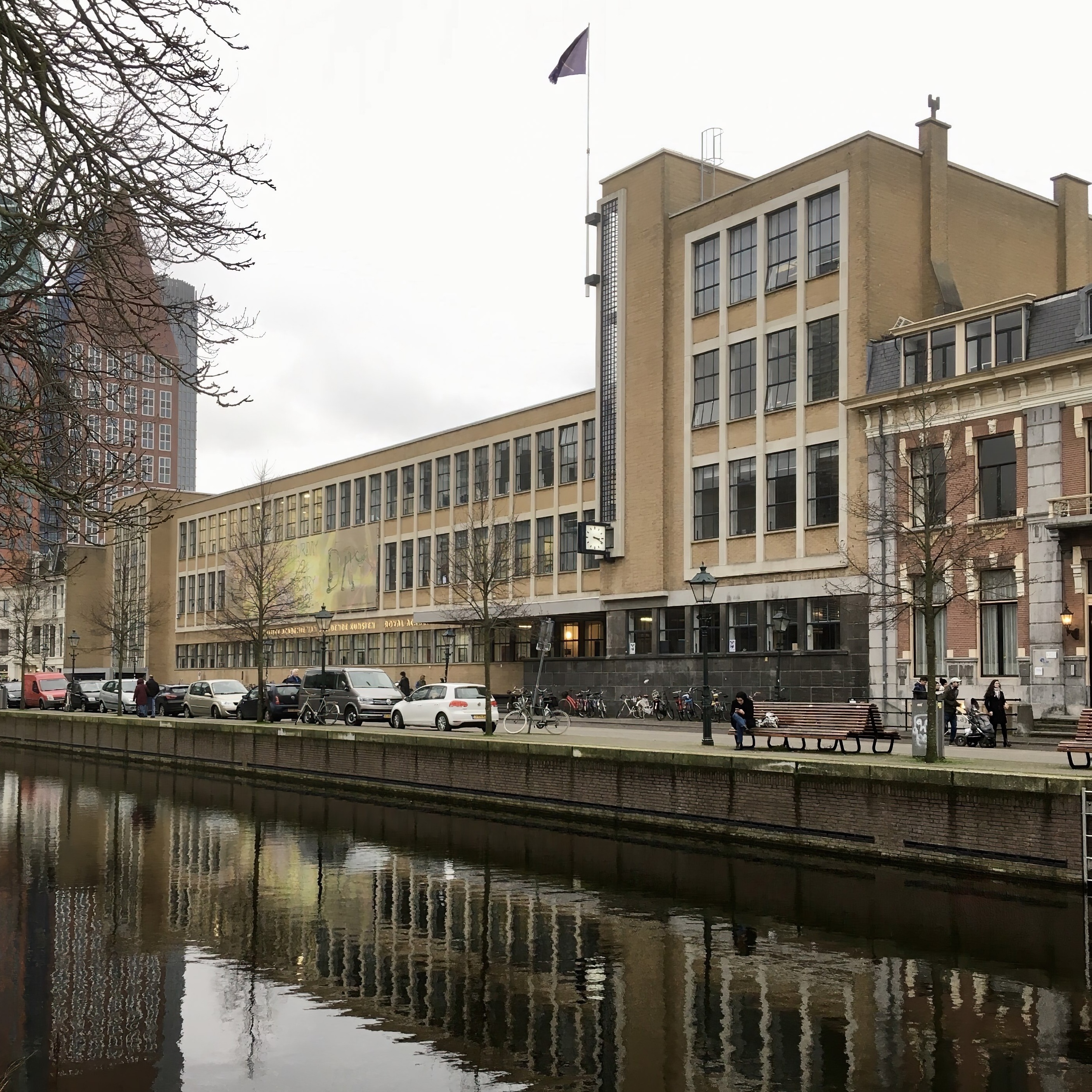
- Other name: KABK
- Former names: Haagsche Teeken-Academie (1682–1859); Academie van Beeldende Kunsten en Technische Wetenschappen (1859–1915); Academie van Beeldende Kunsten (1915–1957)
- Type: Public art and design university of applied sciences
- Established: September 29, 1682; 344 years ago
- Founders: Confrèrie Pictura; Willem Doudijns, Theodoor van der Schuer, Daniel Mijtens the Younger, Robbert Duval, Augustinus Terwesten
- Parent institution: University of the Arts The Hague
- Accreditation: NVAO
- Academic affiliations: Academy of Creative and Performing Arts (ACPA)
- Budget: €2,600,000 of which €1,952,419 spent (2021)
- Chair: Executive Board, University of the Arts The Hague
- Chairman: Huug de Deugd
- Students: 898 (KABK, 2021) • 1,703 (KABK + KC, 2021)
- Undergraduates: 783 (2021)
- Postgraduates: 115 (2021)
- Other students: School for Young Talent (Dance & Music): 84
- Location: Prinsessegracht 4, The Hague, Zuid-Holland, 2514 AN, Netherlands; 52.0815°N 4.3187°E
- Campus: 18,000 square metres (190,000 sq ft); Urban
- Language: English
- Website: www.kabk.nl
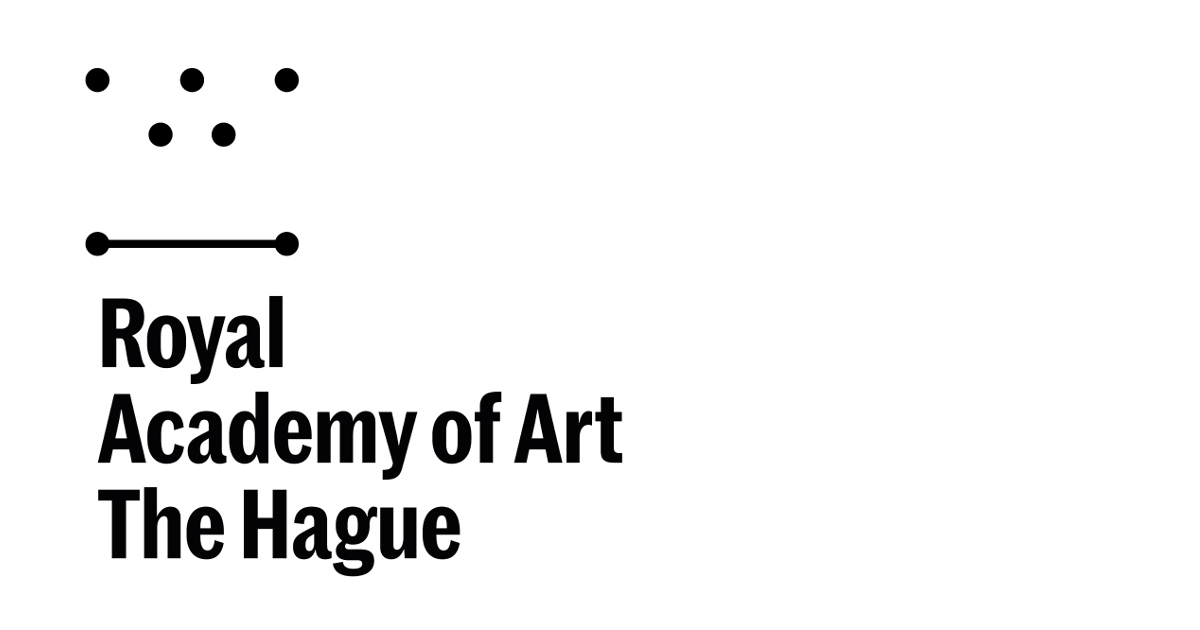

The Royal Academy of Art (Dutch: Koninklijke Academie van Beeldende Kunsten, KABK) is an art and design academy in The Hague, offering programs at both the HBO bachelor's and master's levels, as well as PhD programs.

Succeeding the Haagsche Teeken-Academie (part of the Confrerie Pictura), the academy was founded on 29 September 1682, making it the oldest in the Netherlands and one of the oldest in the world. The academy has been the training ground for a number of significant artists of the Hague School. It was part of the art movement of Dutch Impressionism and in the immediate vicinity of the II. Golden Age of Dutch painting.

While training was strongly oriented towards the classic curriculum throughout much of the 19th century, the academy opened to modernism at the end of the 19th century. Influenced by the Bauhaus, the academy gradually shifted its focus toward a more contemporary art and design style. Within education, the focus on new technologies and new media has expanded dramatically, which is visible in new workplaces and facilities, but also in new study options such as ArtScience, Interactive/Media/Design and Non Linear Narrative. In 1957, in celebration of the academy's 250-year existence, it was awarded the predicate "royal".

Nowadays, it maintains close ties in its curriculum with its mother institution, the University of the Arts The Hague (HDK), as well as Leiden University, under the name "Academy of Creative and Performing Arts" (ACPA). As a result, students are able to follow several elective classes from all institutions falling under that umbrella. Furthermore, the academy's students are 68% international and the academy values this internationalization greatly. It adopts an international approach in its curriculum structure wherever possible.

== History ==
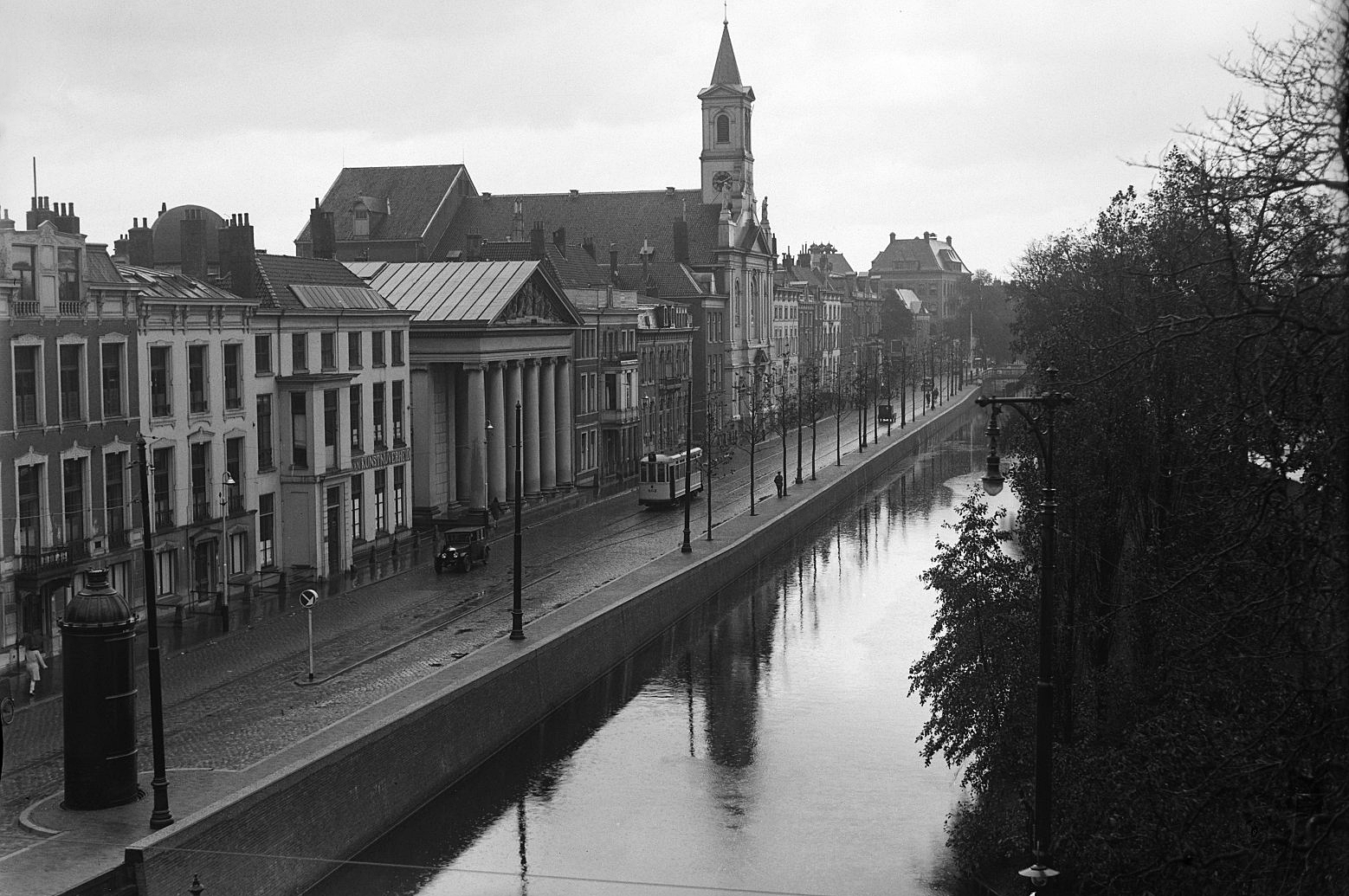
The old building of the Royal Academy of Art in the Prinsessegracht, Den Haag, 1930

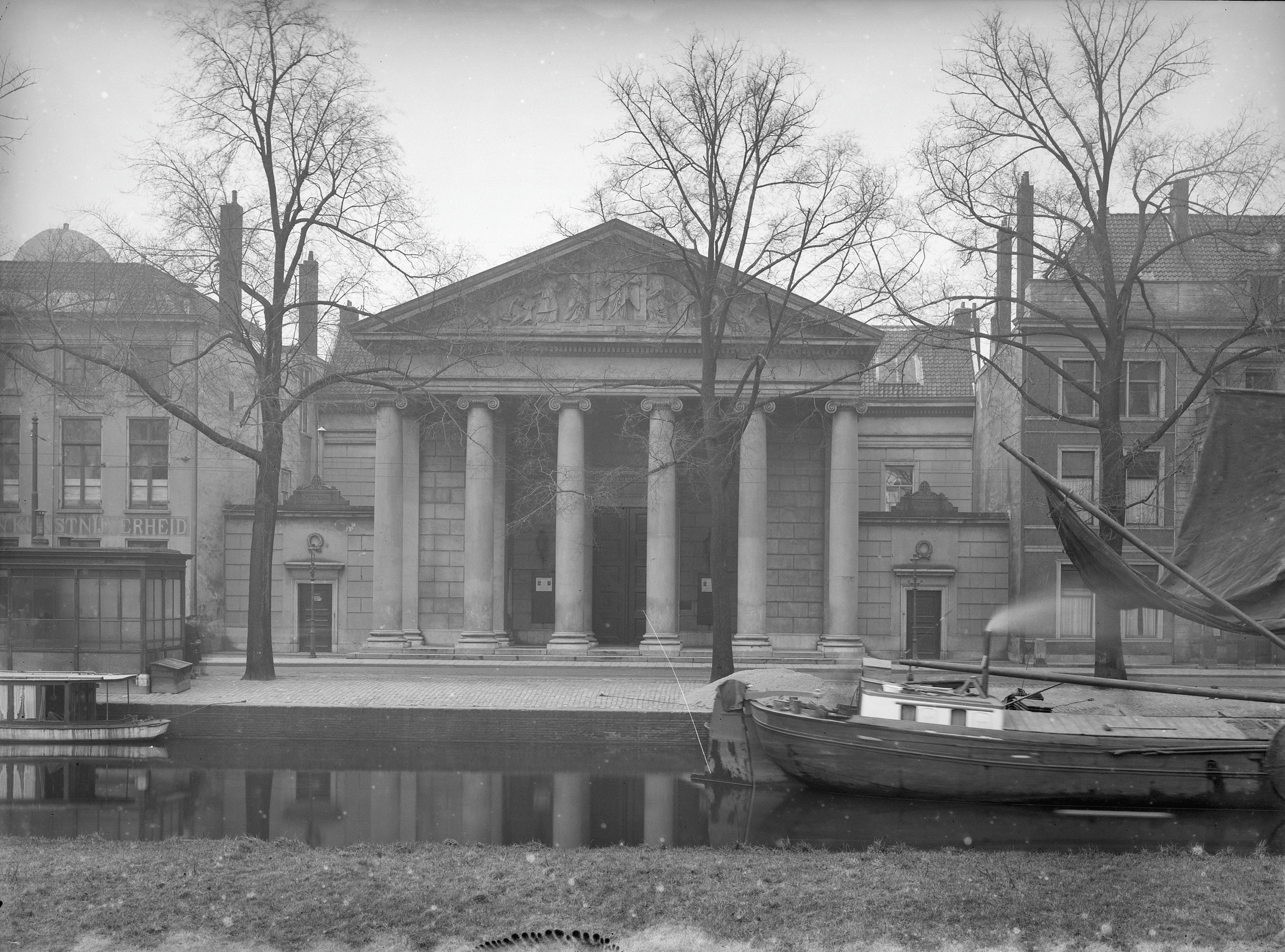
Entrance area of the Royal Academy of Art, Prinsessegracht 3–4, 1930

The Royal Academy of Art The Hague, was founded on September 29, 1682, by Willem Doudijns, Theodor van der Schuer, Daniel Mijtens the Younger, Robert Duval and Augustinus Terwesten as the Haagsche Teeken-Academie ("The Hague Drawing Academy"). In the evening there were drawings classes and on Saturday the society debated about art.

In the 18th century the Hague Academy was a thriving institution, but the end of the 18th century was a difficult time due to the absence of any financial support. The low point was around 1800, when the academy was working with fewer than ten students.

Under William I of the Netherlands, support returned and the old institute grew once again. In 1821, the drawing education was combined with the newly established School of Civil Engineering. After being housed in the Korenbeurs and Boterwaag in 1839, a new neoclassical building was designed by city architect Zeger Reyers (1790–1857), located at the Prinsessegracht.

In the 19th century, the artists Johannes Bosboom, Isaac Israëls, Willem Maris, Jan Hendrik Weissenbruch and George Hendrik Breitner were trained here. In 1937, a new academy building designed by J.H. Plantenga (1891–c. 1945), J.W.E. Buijs and J.B. Lürsen was completed on the site of the old neoclassical building.

In 1990, the Royal Academy merged with the Royal Conservatory of The Hague into the "School of Visual Arts, Music and Dance". In 2010 the Dutch government elevated the joint institutions to "University of the Arts in The Hague". The two still go by their original names as well, to underline their individual identities.

The academy awards the Gerrit Noordzij Prize initial designs every two years.

=== Buildings ===
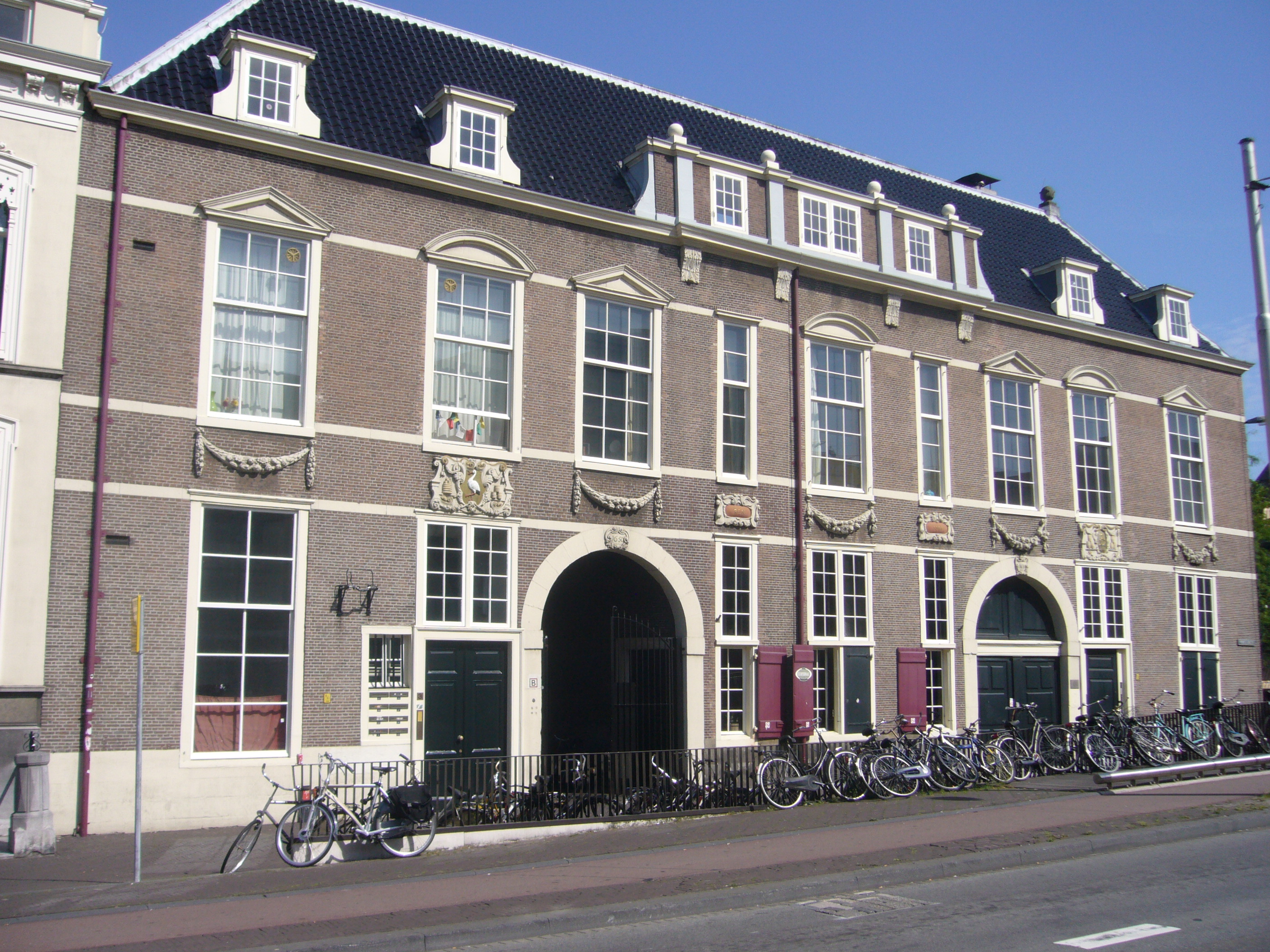
The Boterwaag at the Prinsegracht

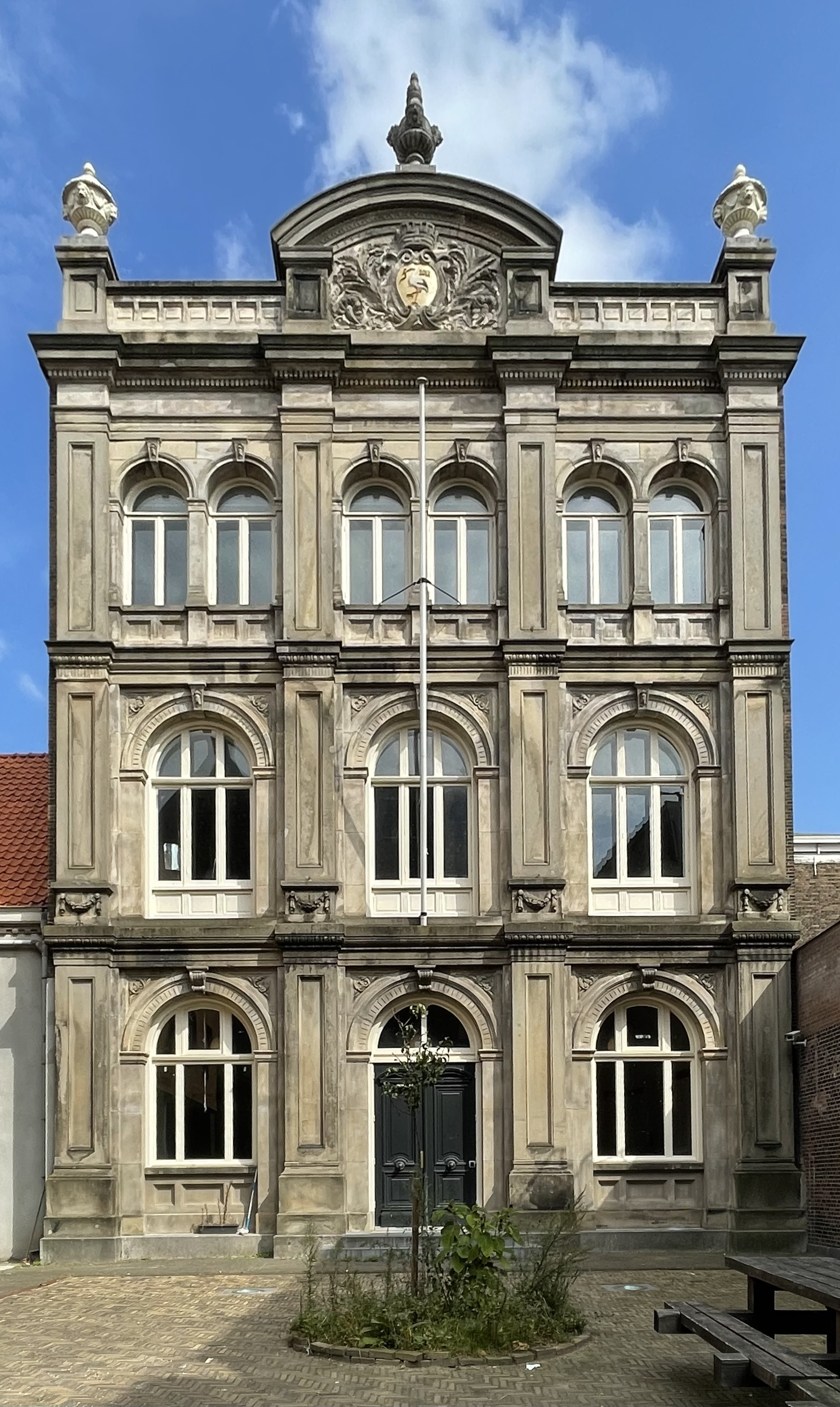
Bleijenburg 38

After 1821, the academy grew in importance again, as the School voor Burgerlijke Bouwkunde was connected to it. Now it moved in the house of the Korenbeurs (Grain Exchange). This small building was important for the future of this school.

Later, it moved to the Boterwaag (weighing house for butter), but there was not enough light for the painting classes. Finally in 1839 the academy got its own building at the Prinsessegracht; it was designed by Zeger Reyers in the architectural style of neoclassicism.

In the 20th century, the classes grew, necessitating more space. Thus, from 1934 to 1937, the academy got a new building at Prinsessegracht 4. The building was built in the style of the Bauhaus. And in the 1990s the adjacent historic building at Bleijenburg 38 was acquired.

=== Hague School ===
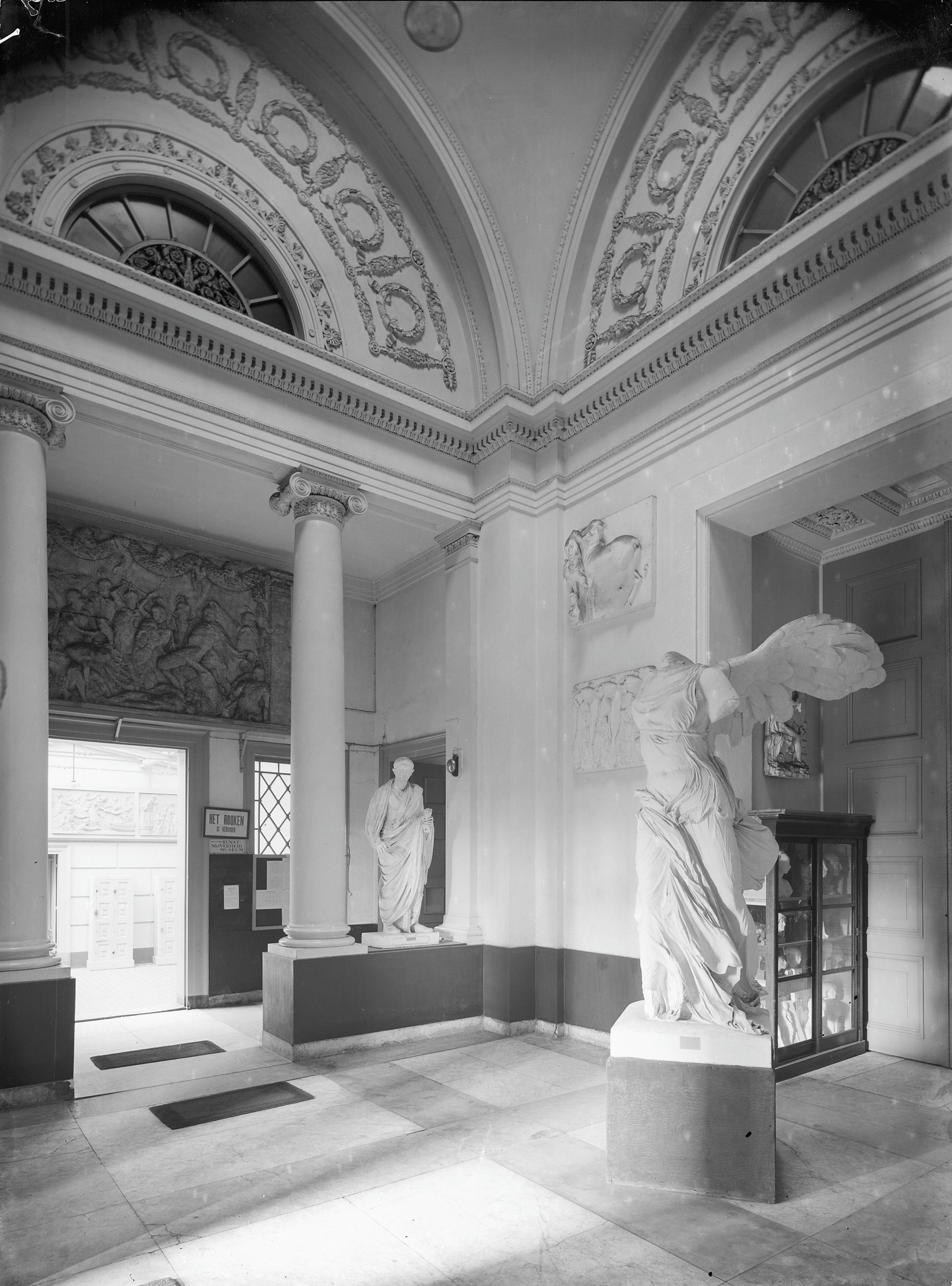
Lobby Academy building in March 1926

At the end of the 19th century, the art scene in The Hague flourished, in what was also known internationally as the Hague School. Many well-known artists like Breitner, the brothers Maris (Jacob Maris and Matthijs Maris) and Bosboom were trained in the academy. In the first half of the 20th century the academy played an important role in the Netherlands, too.

The new departments of photography and design arose under Bauhaus-influence.

At that time, the teachers of the avant-garde such as Gerrit Kiljan (1881–1961), Paul Schuitema (1897–1973), Paul Citroen (1896–1983) and Cor Alon (1892–1967) dominated the academy. The academy expanded its curriculum as one of the first Dutch schools by teaching in the field of industrial design.

In 1938 a new building erected on the site of the old house. The design was one of the architectural firm Plantenga, Buijs & Lürsen.

=== Modern times ===
In 1990, the academy and the Royal Conservatory joined the Academy of Fine Arts, Music and Dance (now University of the Arts The Hague).

In 2000, a general overhaul led by architect Van Mourik Vermeulen was carried out, enlarging the campus.

In 2001, a collaboration between Leiden University and the Royal Academy of Art resulted in the first formalised collaboration between a Dutch university and art institute. The Royal Conservatory, the Royal Academy of Art and Leiden University now offer joint degree programmes, including ones at doctoral level.

The academy's focus on novel technologies and new media has resulted in state-of-the-art workshops, studios and departments such as ArtScience, Interactive/Media/Design and Non Linear Narrative.

Department	Year founded
Fine Arts	1682
Graphic Design	1929
Interior Architecture (BA)	1929
Industrial Design	1945
Textile & Fashion	1956
Photography	1967
ArtScience (BA)	1989
TypeMedia	1994
PhDArts	2001
ArtScience (MA)	2003
Interactive/Media/Design	2006
Artistic Research	2009
Interior Architecture (MA)	2011
Non Linear Narrative	2017
Photography & Society	2018

=== Supervisory Board ===
In November 2023 a member of the Supervisory Board stepped down at his main place of work due to accusations of funding fraud by the Eu. He was allowed to stay on at the Art Academy in The Hague.

=== Department structure ===
The KABK offers two broad bachelor's degrees to its students, a BA Design and a BA Autonomous Fine Arts. It divides these degrees into several departments or programs. These departments are the organizational unit within the Royal Academy of Art that are responsible for the curriculum of the bachelors' specializations. A specialization is an implementation of a degree program with a focus on a specific profile within the objectives of the program, e.g. on a specific artistic discipline. For example, the departments Graphic Design and Interactive/Media/Design, whilst being a separate department with a different faculty and curriculum, are both specializations of the same broader bachelor's degree, BA Design. All specializations within a degree program share the same final qualifications/learning objectives. Each department also has its own propaedeutic phase and its own main phase.

From the onset of the bachelor's program, there is a focus on activities related to research. The curriculum is designed to instill a research-oriented, critical attitude in students. This critical approach is evident in students' work, papers, and – where applicable – final theses. Emphasis is placed on reflection, critical assessment, and the analysis of one's own and others' work in both historical and contemporary perspectives. To facilitate this, research is conducted to understand the process and motivation behind work created elsewhere and in the past.

At KABK, this research-oriented approach is introduced in the academy-wide preparatory class Research&Discourse. It is also observed in later years in subjects such as fashion or photography criticism, and in numerous practical and studio assignments. In some departments, students initiate their own research, while others have established research groups.

The specialization Fine Arts (BA Autonomous Fine Arts) is also offered as a part-time program, and so is the specialization Photography (BA Design). Final qualifications of full-time and part-time programs are exactly the same, but have less contact hours than full-time programs, and thus require more independent work from students. The duration of the part-time programs in terms of calendar years depends on the time the student is able to spend on independent learning and possible exemptions that can be granted.

In addition, KABK offers various elective Individual Study Tracks (ISTs) which essentially serve as mini-departments. The goal of an IST is to facilitate new education and gauge the potential of programs to serve as future departments.

==== Fine arts ====
Four years full-time or part-time bachelor's program that aims to align the past of fine art with its present and its future. The program covers a wide range of techniques and technologies relevant for the making of art, such as painting, drawing, printing, video, sculpture and performance.

The department is led by department co-heads Antoinette Vonder Mühll and Carl Johan Högberg. In addition, the department leadership consists of two coordinators, Collette Rayner and Wais Wardak.

The specialization Fine Arts is also offered as a part-time program. Also, in the same specialization, an opportunity is offered to selected students who successfully completed the propaedeutic phase to combine the program with the bachelor's degree program in Art History (Arts, Media and Society) of Leiden University. In this Combined Degree program, study components of the main phase of the specialization Fine Art of the KABK with study components of the Art History program of Leiden University are combined into one shared program of 180 ECs. This leads to the student obtaining both a BA degree at the Royal Academy of Art and a BA degree at Leiden University.

===== Faculty and emeriti faculty =====
- Rachel Bacon
- Maura Biava
- Channa Boon
- Esiri Erheriene-Essi
- Irene Drooglever Fortuijn
- Carl Johan Högberg
- Bram de Jonghe
- Winnie Koekelbergh
- André Kruysen
- Frank Lisser
- Tatjana Macić
- Vibeke Mascini
- Sanja Medić
- Xue Mu
- Jonas Ohlsson
- Femmy Otten
- Jorrit Paaijmans
- Maria Pask
- Antonis Pittas
- David Powell
- Thomas Raat
- Ewoud van Rijn
- Onno Schilstra
- Leonie Schneider
- Elly Strik
- Agnieszka Wodzińska

==== Graphic design ====
Four years full-time bachelor's program that covers a wide range of techniques and technologies, such as design, interaction, image, coding and typography. From 2013 to 2021, the department was led by Roosje Klap and Niels Schrader and is now jointly headed by Lauren Alexander and Chantal Hendriksen.

=== Global faculty and emeriti faculty ===
- Peter Biľak
- Erik van Blokland
- Gert Dumbar
- Gijs Bakker
- Mitch Paone
- Adam Broomberg
- Oliver Chanarin
- Rob Hornstra
- Donald Weber
- Kees Bol
- Jacobus Josephus Eeckhout
- Marcel van Eeden
- Gerrit Noordzij
- Paul Schuitema
- Fred Smeijers
- Nigel Thomson
- Sybren Valkema

== Campus ==
campus

== Academics ==
=== Admissions ===
Admission to the programs at the KABK is highly selective, based on a comprehensive admission examination that includes an evaluation of portfolios, interviews, and often on-site or online exercises. The acceptance rate varies greatly per department. For instance, in the 2023–2024 academic year, around 1200 applicants competed for roughly 50 places in the graphic design program, putting the admission rate for that year at a mere 4%.

The graduation rate also varies. In the 2021–2022 academic year, 536 were admitted and 434 graduated. The number of admitted as well as graduating students has increased in previous years, with 390 admitted in the 2016–2017 academic year and 256 graduated, while in the 2019–2020 academic year, 465 were admitted and 353 graduated.

==== Grants and financial support ====
KABK offers financial support through the Profileringsfonds which is available for students who experience exceptional circumstances that cause study delays. Non-EU/EEA students who are ineligible for a study grant or loan may receive financial aid under certain conditions. Furthermore, the interfaculty School for Young Talent ensures that talented students are not kept from studying because their parents cannot afford tuition. There are various funds and institutions that can provide financial assistance to help bear the cost of their education.

For non-EU/EEA students, the Holland Scholarship is available, providing a one-time grant of €5,000 for the first year of study.

While the COVID-19 pandemic has had an impact on the mobility of students and staff, opportunities are being assessed on a case-by-case basis. In terms of scholarships, every academic year sees some students benefitting from the Erasmus+ program, Holland Scholarship, and other financial aid. For example, in the 2019–2020 academic year, the Erasmus+ program facilitated the mobility of 42 students and 15 staff members from KABK. In the following year, 42 students and one staff member participated in the program. For example, during the academic year 2019–2020 and 2020–2021, three students each year received the Holland Scholarship.

Students with refugee status are subject to a specific regulation. Lastly, EU/EEA/Swiss students younger than 30 years old starting at KABK can apply for a regular loan and a tuition fee loan with DUO. In contrast, those older than 30 can apply for a lifelong learning loan with DUO.

== Student life ==
Student body composition (2021–2022)
Age	Men	Women	Other	Total	%
15–19	17	39	0	56	6.2%
20–24	159	345	1	505	56.2%
25–29	91	139	0	230	25.6%
30–34	27	40	0	67	7.5%
35–39	9	9	0	18	2%
40–44	2	11	0	13	1.4%
45–49	0	3	0	3	0.3%
50–54	1	3	0	4	0.4%
55–59	0	2	0	2	0.2%

=== Demographics ===
The academy argues that art and design are pre-eminently international disciplines. As such, it assumes an international orientation.

KABK has a large international student population, with 63% of students being international. The student body is highly diverse, with about 60 different nationalities represented in the 2021–2022 academic year. Out of 565 international students, 384 were from the EU/EEA, and 181 were not. According to the OSIRIS report in 2018, EU students came mostly from Germany, France, Italy, and Poland. Non-EU students predominantly came from South Korea, the United States, Russia, and China. The teaching at KABK is primarily in English and, when necessary, bilingual.

The student body at KABK spans a variety of age groups, from teenagers to individuals in their late fifties, indicating a diverse age range within the institution. However, the largest proportion of students fall within the younger age brackets.

A consistent trend observed across all age groups is the vast predominance of female students, indicative of the overall gender distribution at KABK.

==== Government intervention of internationalization ====
The number of foreign students at Dutch universities has been rising for years, reaching 122,287 in 2023. About 40 percent of first-year students that year came from abroad.

The House of Representatives has long called for the flow of international students to be limited. According to the House, the accessibility of education is under pressure due to the large number of international students. While universities welcomed these students for the additional income and diversity they brought, the downside was increased pressure on institutions and greater workload for teachers. Additionally, the Netherlands is grappling with a housing problem.

By mid-2025, each program must demonstrate that using English as a language of instruction adds value. For this, universities must seek approval from the Commission for Efficiency in Higher Education (Dutch: Commissie Doelmatigheid Hoger Onderwijs, CDHO), which advises the minister on the efficiency of the program. By monitoring this, Minister of Education, Culture and Science Robbert Dijkgraaf aims to reduce the proliferation of English-language programs. Currently, separate approval for a program taught in another language is not required.

The existing law mandates that universities must teach in Dutch unless there is an incidental necessity to teach in another language. According to Dijkgraaf, these exceptions have been formulated too broadly, resulting in too many programs being offered in other languages. This point was brought forward by Dijkgraaf during a committee meeting of the House of Representatives.

Simultaneously, Dijkgraaf intends to allow English-language courses in Dutch bachelor programs. No more than a third of all courses may be taught in a language other than Dutch. This equates to 60 out of 180 credits in a three-year program.

A spokesperson for Minister Dijkgraaf confirmed reports from Trouw and De Volkskrant about the plans to curb the number of English-language programs. Dijkgraaf plans to enshrine these changes in law by the end of the summer of 2023.

== Controversy ==
=== Sexual misconduct ===
==== 2022 upskirt scandal ====
In August 2022, Pim Voorneman, a 60-year-old teacher and artist, was confronted by Ranti Tjan, the director at the time, over serious misconduct allegations. Voorneman admitted to his misbehavior and was dismissed from his position on September 1 of that year. Voorneman's activities came to light when he was caught surreptitiously photographing, or upskirting, a woman in a fitting room in Utrecht. Upon her report, an unannounced police house search in The Hague unveiled numerous additional photos, some taken at the KABK building.

In response, Ranti Tjan issued a statement to faculty and students expressing shock and reiterating the academy's commitment to ensuring a safe environment for all. He pledged a zero-tolerance approach towards any form of boundary-crossing behavior. While the police investigation continues, the exact scope of the incident remains uncertain. Voorneman himself claims to have not photographed minors, men or faculty staff of the KABK, and further states that the faces in the images are not identifiable. Many of the photographic incidents occurred outside the academy and seemed to involve only a limited number of students. The academy has chosen not to launch an internal investigation or report the incident itself, but rather to await the outcome of the judicial investigation.

As a senior member of the academy's faculty since 1990, Voorneman is described by peers to have had a distinguished career as an installation artist, sculptor, and typographer, as well as a significant role in The Hague's art scene.

==== 2013 sexual misconduct scandal ====
According to a 2020 report by NRC, Julian Andeweg (also known as Juliaan Andeweg), a former student of the KABK, had been accused of sexual misconduct by multiple women, including some incidents that occurred while he was studying at the institution. These allegations have sparked a wider discussion about sexual harassment and abuse in the art world in both the Netherlands and Belgium.

Despite multiple warnings about Andeweg's behavior to art institutions, gallery owners, and educational institutions, the artist's career has continued to flourish. The accusations against him span a period of at least 14 years, and at least five victims have filed complaints with the police, prompting an investigation. NRC spoke with about eighty men and women, both domestically and abroad on the matter. During his time at the KABK, Andeweg's artistic (and, at the time, seemingly innocent) evolution was deemed "fascinating" by the KABK staff, according to a former student. Allegedly, influential faculty staff at the time had expressed their admiration for his work, praising his rock 'n roll image and quickly characterizing him as a "real artist", making it increasingly difficult for victims to come forward and file a complaint.

The Public Prosecutor's Office in Amsterdam has confirmed that Andeweg will be brought to court. He has been accused of rape, assault, intimidation, violence, stalking, and theft by at least twenty men and women. Six charges have been filed against him, one of which has been dismissed due to statute of limitations. The Prosecutor's Office stated that the investigative file on Andeweg has been "completed," and there is "enough reason for the public prosecutor to summon." They expect that the case against Andeweg will begin before the summer of 2023.

== Notable alumni ==
- Peter Alma
- Kees Andrea
- Pat Andrea
- Joost Baljeu
- Marius Bauer
- Joop Beljon
- Charles Bolsius
- Loek Bos
- Johannes Bosboom
- George Hendrik Breitner
- Rie Cramer
- Jan Cremer
- Toon Dupuis
- Marcel van Eeden
- Pierre Tetar van Elven
- Johanna van Eybergen
- Willem van Genk
- Maurice Heerdink
- Carli Hermès
- Isaac Israëls
- Pierre Kleykamp
- Karel Klinkenberg
- Charles Leickert
- Lambert Lourijsen
- Jacob Jan van der Maaten
- Johfra
- Tom Manders
- Jan Mankes
- Willem Maris
- Jacob Maris
- Matthijs Maris
- Gerrit Noordzij
- Yvonne Oerlemans
- Nancy van Overveldt
- Ootje Oxenaar
- Ru Paré
- Alida Jantina Pott
- Louise Jama-van Raders
- Rahi Rezvani
- Matthijs Röling
- Dolly Rudeman
- Toer van Schayk
- Philip Vermeulen
- Lida Lopes Cardozo Kindersley
- Marleen Sleeuwits
- Artiom Iacob
