= Maurice Heerdink =

Dutch painter (born 1955)

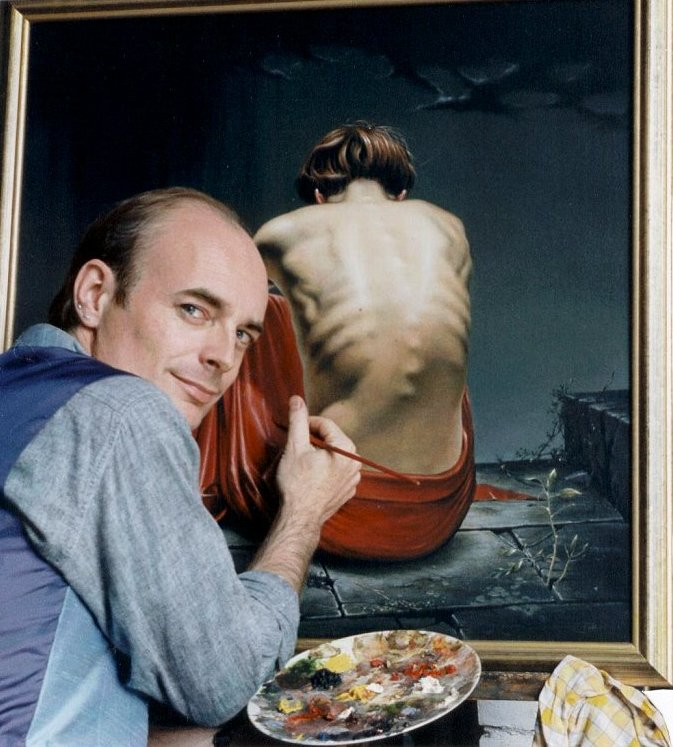
Heerdink in 2004

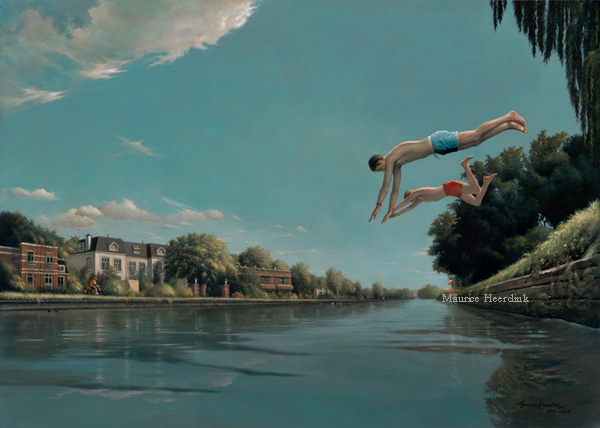
Forbidden fruit, De Vliet, painting by Heerdink

Maurice Heerdink (12 August 1955, The Hague) is a Dutch painter known mostly for his subtle painted photo-realistic male nude art.

Between 2004 and 2005, he portrayed theatre legends like Ellen Vogel, Jenny Arean, Willem Nijholt, Johnny Kraaijkamp Jr. and Aus Greidanus Jr. These works were a part of his 2005 exhibition in the Westfries Museum, that was opened by actress Sacha Bulthuis. In 2011, he portrayed several dancers.

In November 2014, the book The Art Of Maurice Heerdink was published.

In 2018, he started a collaboration with German musician and filmmaker Ronny Strehmann for the Strehmann Music Project which resulted in paintings and music videos.

== Series ==
- "1980-1988 iconography of the Mayaculture"
- "1990- Male Physique"
- "2001-2007 mythology from Greece and the Bible: Saint Sebastian, Acteon, Sisyphus, Prometheus and the flagellation of Christ."
- "2005-2006 Theater Portraits Ellen Vogel, Jenny Arean, Willem Nijholt, Johnny Kraaijkamp jr. and Aus Greidanus jr and 2011Marne van Opstal - NDT."
- "2001-2014 Falconryj"
- "2016-2017 Waterscapes"
- "2018- Strehmann music project"

== Exhibitions ==
- "1981 Ministry of Finance, The Hague"
- "1985 solo - Hotel des Indes, The Hague"
- "1998 group - Gaygames Amsterdam"
- "2006 solo – Westfriesmuseum, Hoorn"
- "2016 solo – Museum Soest, Soest"
- "2018 group – Zandvoort's Museum, Zandvoort"
- "2018 group – Museum Swaensteyn, Voorburg"

== Books ==
- 1999 Het Jezus Mysterie Catalogus
- 1999 Mathilde - Joop van Loon
- 2002 Loïc - Alain Meyer (Frankrijk)
- 2007 Louis de Bourbon - Claude Puzin (Frankrijk)
- 2011 100 Artists of the male Figure (USA)
- 2014 The Art Of Maurice Heerdink - Maurice Heerdink
- 2018 Quentin Crisp - Nigel Kelly
- 2015 Mathilde

== Television ==
- "1998 -The Playfull Eroticism of Maurice Heerdink documantery for MVS Gay tv Amsterdam"
- "2005 - Het Uur van de Wolf: Mathilde Willink Superpoes documentary with Heerdink paintings about Mathilde Willink, the ex-wife of Carel Willink"

== Projects ==
- 2013 Video: Illuminated Bodies, The Gift, Summer 2013: my states of mind.
- 2018 Musik Projekt Strehmann. Videos: Free, Kartenhaus
- 2019 Strehmann-Heerdink videos: Petits Soleils, Oderburch, They Are Here

== Prizes ==
- "1999 - Public award first prize for the painting The Return Of The New Messiah during the exhibition The Jesus Mystery."
