= Bisschop =

Bisschop is a Dutch surname meaning "bishop". It may refer to:

- Abraham Bisschop (1670–1729), Dutch still life and bird painter, son of Cornelis
- Christoffel Bisschop (1828–1904), Dutch genre painter and lithographer, husband of Kate
- Cornelis Bisschop (1630–1674), Dutch genre painter
- Hilligje Bisschop (born 1948), Dutch Christian feminist
- Jacobus Bisschop (1658–1697), Dutch painter, son of Cornelis
- Kate Bisschop-Swift (1834–1928), English-born Dutch painter, wife of Christoffel
- Richard Bisschop (1849–1926), painter, graphic artist and watercolorist, husband of Suze
- Roelof Bisschop (born 1956), Dutch historian and politician
- Simon Bisschop (1583–1643), Dutch theologian and Remonstrant
- Suze Bisschop-Robertson (1855–1922), Dutch Impressionist painter, wife of Richard
- Walter Steins Bisschop (1810–1881), Dutch Jesuit priest, Vicar Apostolic of Bombay 1860–1867

== See also ==
- De Bisschop
- Bischof
- Bishop (surname)
