= List of people from Leeuwarden =

This is a chronological list of the most notable people from Leeuwarden, who were either born and raised there or were long-term residents. For a more extensive, alphabetical list see People from Leeuwarden.

See also List of mayors of Leeuwarden

== Born in Leeuwarden ==
=== 15th century ===
- Wijerd Jelckama (c. 1490–1523), military commander
- Hendrik Niehoff (1495–c. 1561), pipe organ maker

=== 16th century ===
- Obbe Philips (c. 1500–1568), anabaptist
- Dirk Philips (1504–1568), anabaptist and theologian
- Hans Vredeman de Vries (1527–c. 1607), architect, painter, and engineer
- Johannes Basius (c. 1540–1596), lawyer
- Dominicus Arumaeus (1579–1637), jurist
- Pieter de Valck (1584–1624), painter
- Wybrand de Geest (1592–1661), painter
- Matthijs Harings (1593–1667), painter
- Jeronimus Cornelisz (1598–1629), apothecary

=== 17th century ===
- Margaretha de Heer (1603–1665), painter
- Douwe Juwes de Dowe (1608–1662), painter
- Maerten Boelema de Stomme (1611–1644), painter
- Saskia van Uylenburg (1612–1642), wife of the painter Rembrandt van Rijn
- Abraham Lambertsz van den Tempel (1622–1672), painter
- Wilhelmus à Brakel (1635–1711), minister
- Wigerus Vitringa (1657–1725), painter
- Campegius Vitringa (1659–1722), theologian
- Jetske Reinou van der Malen (bap. 1681–1752), poet
- Siwart Haverkamp (1684–1742), classicist

=== 18th century ===
- Matthijs Accama (1702–1783), painter
- Jacques-Georges Chauffepié (1702–1786), biographer, preacher
- Douwe Sirtema van Grovestins (1710–1778), courtier and politician
- Willem van Haren (1710–1768), poet
- Princess Amalia of Nassau-Dietz (1710–1777), princess
- William IV, Prince of Orange (1711–1751), stadtholder
- Lodewijk Caspar Valckenaer (1715–1785), classical scholar
- Rienk Jelgerhuis (1729–1806), painter
- Joachim van Plettenberg (1739–1793), colonial governor
- Princess Carolina of Orange-Nassau (1743–1787), regent
- Theodorus van Kooten (1749–1813), poet and politician
- Johannes Jelgerhuis (1770–1836), painter and actor
- Sybren Klazes Sybrandi (1772–1854), mennonite minister
- Eelke Jelles Eelkema (1788–1839), painter
- Wilhelmina van Idsinga (1788–1819), painter
- Jacobus Schroeder van der Kolk (1797–1862), anatomist and physiologist

=== 19th century ===
- Charles William Meredith van de Velde (1818–1898), lieutenant-at-sea and painter
- Julius Vitringa Coulon (1824–1878), politician
- Christoffel Bisschop (1828-1904), painter
- Willem Frederik Reinier Suringar (1832–1898), botanist
- Piet Paaltjens (1835–1894), minister and romantic author
- Lawrence Alma-Tadema (1836–1912), knighted painter
- Sierk Coolsma (1840–1926), missionary and writer
- George Arnold Escher (1843–1939), civil engineer
- Klaas Plantinga (1846–1922), distiller
- Richard Bisschop (1849–1926), painter
- Cornelis Adriaan Lobry van Troostenburg de Bruyn (1857–1904), chemist
- Pieter Jelles Troelstra (1860–1930), politician
- Dirk van Erp (1860–1933), artisan and metalsmith
- Johannes Henricus Gerardus Jansen (1868–1936), archbishop
- Theo Molkenboer (1871–1920), painter
- Theodoor Hendrik van de Velde (1873–1937), gynaecologist
- Folkert Posthuma (1874–1943), politician
- Mata Hari (1876–1917), exotic dancer and courtesan, possible double agent
- Gerhard Westermann (1880–1971), artist
- Richard Hageman (1881–1966), conductor, pianist, composer, and actor
- Max Blokzijl (1884-1946), singer and journalist
- Hendrik Wouda (1885–1946), architect
- Jacob Baart de la Faille (1886–1959), art critic
- Arie Bijvoet (1891–1976), footballer
- Bert Sas (1892–1948), military attaché
- Ate Faber (1894–1962), fencer
- Jeanne Bieruma Oosting (1898–1994), sculptor, engraver and painter
- Sijtse Jansma (1898–1977), tug of war competitor
- Jan Jacob Slauerhoff (1898–1936), poet and novelist
- M. C. Escher (1898–1972), graphic artist

=== 20th century ===
==== 1900s ====
- Christine Buisman (1900–1936), phytopathologist
- Koos Sinninghe Damsté (1902–1995), lawyer
- Pieter Oosterhoff (1904–1978), astronomer
- Havank (1904–1964), writer, journalist, and translator
- Piet Zanstra (1905–2003), architect
- Roeffie Vermeulen (1906–1963), sailor
- Jan Graafland (born 1909), footballer
- Petrus Wijtse Winkel (1909–2012), colonial administrator

==== 1910s ====
- Albert Winsemius (1910–1996), economist
- Bernard Slicher van Bath (1910–2004), historian
- Bert Bakker (1912–1969), writer
- Nina Baanders-Kessler (1915–2002), sculptor
- Haije Kramer (1917–2004), chess player

==== 1920s ====
- Folkert de Roos (1920–2000), economist
- Ted Meines (1921–2016), army general and activist
- Ruurd Dirk Hoogland (1922–1994), botanist and explorer
- Jan de Vries (1924–2012), soldier
- Jitse van der Veen (1928–1976), swimmer
- Jaap Boersma (1929–2012), politician
- Wim Cohen (1923–2000), mathematician

==== 1930s ====
- Eva and Abraham Beem (1932/1934–1944), young Jewish Holocaust victims
- Jan Hettema (1933–2016), cyclist
- Jan D. Achenbach (born 1935), engineer
- Sieta Posthumus (born 1936), swimmer
- Nikolai van der Heyde (born 1936), film director and screenwriter
- Cor Boonstra (born 1938), chief executive
- Cornelis Dirk Andriesse (born 1939), physicist

==== 1940s ====
- Johan Bleeker (born 1942), space technology scientist
- Sytse Douma (born 1942), organizational theorist
- Cisca Dresselhuys (born 1943), journalist and magazine editor
- Femme Gaastra (born 1945), historian
- Hans Monderman (1945–2008), traffic engineer
- L. Bouke van der Meer (born 1945), archaeologist
- Meindert Fennema (born 1946), political scientist
- Piet Hoekstra (born 1947), cyclist
- Theo de Jong (born 1947), footballer and football manager
- Rudy Koopmans (born 1948), boxer
- Tom Pitstra (born 1949), politician
- Oeki Hoekema (born 1949), footballer

==== 1950s ====
- Peter den Oudsten (born 1951), mayor
- Harm Wiersma (born 1953), draughts player and politician
- Margreeth Smilde (born 1954), politician
- Jan Hogendijk (born 1955), mathematician and historian
- Henk van der Zwan (born 1956), diplomat
- Koos Formsma (born 1957), businessman
- Piet Wildschut (born 1957), footballer
- Piter Wilkens (born 1959), musician

==== 1960s ====
- Hendrik Tolman (born 1961), civil engineer
- Foeke Booy (born 1962), footballer and football manager
- Annejet van der Zijl (born 1962), writer
- Aukje de Vries (born 1964), politician
- Jan Veenhof (born 1969), footballer

==== 1970s ====
- Tjitske Reidinga (born 1972), actress
- Richard Schuil (born 1973), beach volleyball player
- Jarich Bakker (born 1974), cyclist
- Peter van der Vlag (born 1977), footballer

==== 1980s ====
- Rune Massing (born 1980), badminton player
- Harm Zeinstra (born 1989), footballer

==== 1990s ====
- Sander Arends (born 1991), tennis player
- Sanne Wevers (born 1991), gymnast
- Lieke Wevers (born 1991), gymnast
- Mark Diemers (born 1993), footballer
- Itzhak de Laat (born 1994), short track speed skater
- Joost Klein (born 1997), musician and rapper
