= Allotments near The Hague =

Oil painting by Jacob Maris

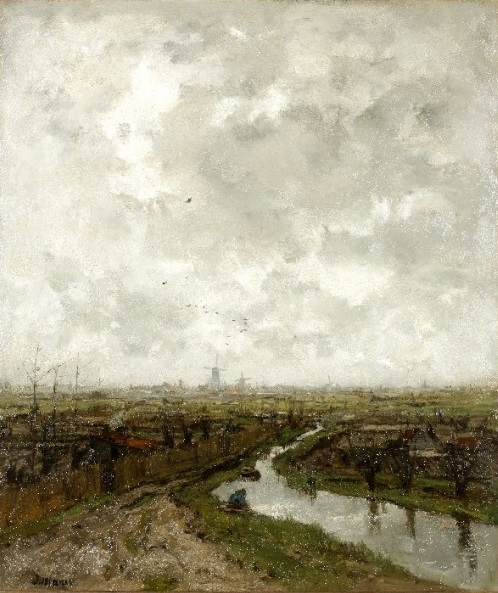
- Artist: Jacob Maris
- Year: 1870s
- Medium: oil paint, canvas
- Dimensions: 64 cm (25 in) × 55 cm (22 in)
- Location: Kunstmuseum Den Haag

Allotments near The Hague (also called: Vegetable Gardens near The Hague) is a painting by the Dutch artist Jacob Maris. Painted around 1878 using oil on canvas, it depicts a then still undeveloped part of The Hague near Scheveningen. It measures 62.5 by 54 centimetres (24.6 by 21.3 inches) and is painted in the style of the Hague School. The work is in the collection of the Kunstmuseum Den Haag.

== Context ==
Apart from time spent studying in Antwerp and a stay in Paris from 1865 to 1871, Jacob Maris lived and worked in The Hague with his brother Matthijs. He painted Allotments near The Hague around 1878, shortly after he moved to Bazarstraat, not far from the Laan van Meerdervoort. The area was still largely undeveloped and was dedicated to allotments for the city's inhabitants. It was not until the start of the twentieth century that it become urbanised.

Maris's friend Théophile de Bock wrote about the origin of the painting: "Around this time, Maris often went for walks with Anton Mauve past the Laan van Meerdervoort towards Dekkersduin. On one of these walks he got the idea for the painting entitled Allotments in The Hague. While still in the open air, he drew some perspectives lines of the panoramic landscape on a sheet of paper, and when home he got to work. It became a majestic creation."

Allotments near The Hague is painted in a broad impressionistic manner. The use of colour is sombre and focussed on emphasising the atmospheric representation of the clouds; the influence of 17th-century landscape painter Jacob van Ruisdael is recognisable. The thin grey autumn light spans the landscape and a glimmering silver light is reflected in the water. Autumnal mist pervades the painting, connecting the ground and the air. The vastness of the buildings and meadows is almost limitless, rhythmically interspersed with reed mats, gardeners' houses and pollard willows.

Maris's manner of working has been described thus: "He fumbles and messes around and gradually a harmony of colours emerges and the main lines are established. Only then does he finish the work with lively and thin brushstrokes. But that last touch is set with a master hand and the whole work has the solidity of the most precise drawing." This description fits well for Allotments near The Hague.

== Related sources ==
- John Sillevis and Anne Tabak, 'Het Haagse School boek'. Waanders Uitgevers, Zwolle, Gemeentemuseum Den Haag, 2001. ISBN 904009540X
- John Sillevis: De Haagse School. De collectie van het Haags Gemeentemuseum. Catalogus, Haags Gemeentemuseum, 1988, blz. 178–179. ISBN 90-6730-052-7
