= Hollandsche Teekenmaatschappij =

The Hollandsche Teekenmaatschappij (Dutch drawing society) was an international art society founded in 1876 in The Hague. The purpose of the society was to promote watercolor painting as an art in itself, which until then had been known only as a sketching technique.

== Geschiedenis en leden ==
In 1855, the Société Belge des Aquarellistes was established in Brussels and one of the founders was Willem Roelofs. The society organized exhibitions of Belgian watercolor painters. After a few years members of the Hague School were invited to attend. Soon after this, the Dutch sister society was founded on 31 January 1876.

The founders were: Bernardus Johannes Blommers, Johannes Bosboom, Jozef Israëls, Jacob Maris, Willem Maris, Anton Mauve, Hendrik Willem Mesdag, Philip Sadée, Kate Bisschop-Swift, Julius van de Sande Bakhuyzen and Johannes Stortenbeker. The society enjoyed international acclaim and had honorary members living outside the Netherlands. Among the honorary members were several artists who visited the Netherlands, such as: Paul Jean Clays, Paul Joseph Constantin Gabriël, Charles Hermans, Edouard Huberti, Jean Baptiste Madou, Charles Rochussen and Lawrence Alma-Tadema. The German painter Max Liebermann was a summer resident, as was Hubert von Herkomer from Londen. Mose Bianchi from Milan and Vincenzo Cabianca from Rome, were also members. Among the Dutch members were: David Adolph Constant Artz, Albert Neuhuys, Elchanon Verveer, Sina van Houten and Willem Bastiaan Tholen.

== Bibliography ==
- Notulen van de Hollandsche Teekenmaatschappij, 1876-1901, by board member Willem Bastiaan Tholen, Hollandsche Teekenmaatschappij, 1914
- Het Haagse School boek, Waanders Uitgevers, Zwolle, ISBN 90-400-9540-X
- Rijksbureau voor Kunsthistorische Documentatie (RKD) Den Haag
