= Harm Hoeve =

Dutch organist and composer

- Born: Harm Hoeve; 4 December 1964 (age 61); Rouveen, Netherlands
- Occupations: Organist, Composer, conductor
- Years active: 1976–present
- Website: Official website

Harm Hoeve (Rouveen, 4 December 1964) is a Dutch organist and composer.

== Biography ==
Harm Hoeve was born in Rouveen and grew up in a Reformed family. He began his musical education at the music school in Zwolle and subsequently attended the ArtEZ Conservatory there. He studied the pipe organ with Harm Jansen and later took piano lessons with Matthijs Verschoor at the Hilversum Conservatory. He completed his studies with Piet Kee and Guy Bovet at the International Summer Academy for Organists in Haarlem. At the age of 24, he won first prize at the international competition of the 1989 Albert Schweitzer Organ Festival in the Great Church or Lebuïnus Church in Deventer.

Hoeve has made numerous concert tours in Canada. In 1999 he toured British Columbia with Dutch panflutist Noortje van Middelkoop, appearing in churches and concert venues throughout the province. The pair continued to perform together in Canada during subsequent tours, including appearances in Abbotsford, British Columbia, in 2003. In 2006, Hoeve accompanied the Dutch Vecht-IJssel-Veluwe Choir during a tour of British Columbia that included performances in Vernon, Chilliwack, Kamloops, and Williams Lake. Later that year he appeared with the Dutch Reformed Men's Choral Society during its North American tour. Contemporary Canadian newspaper coverage described him as being particularly noted for his organ improvisations and audience-participation performances. By 2007, Hoeve was serving as conductor of the 72-member De Veluwse Stem Choir, an ecumenical choir drawn from communities throughout the Veluwe region of the Netherlands. Under his direction, the choir toured western Canada performing sacred music, English and Dutch choral works, and traditional Dutch hymns.

Hoeve is the resident organist of the Reformed Churches in the Netherlands (Liberated) congregation in Rouveen. He also gives organ concerts in the Netherlands and abroad and has appeared on radio broadcasts of the Evangelische Omroep (EO). He regularly performs on the Cavaillé-Coll organ of The American Cathedral in Paris. There he performs compositions by, among others, Lemmens, Bédard, and Gigout. He is also active as conductor of male choirs in Rijssen and Urk.

In 2014, he was appointed a Member of the Order of Orange-Nassau by Mayor Joop Alssema.

== Selected discography ==
- Gods werk gaat door
- Breng dank, with pianist Johan Bredewout
- Eigen koraalbewerking vanuit Bolsward
- Harm Hoeve Grote Kerk Steenwijk
- Als de bazuinen klinken
- Harm Hoeve Sint-Maartenskerk Zaltbommel
- Harm Hoeve speelt Nederlandse Koraalbewerkingen
- Harm Hoeve bespeelt het orgel van de Martinikerk te Bolsward
- Vreugde alom, with pianist Johan Bredewout
- Festivo
- Colours of Instruments
- Geprezen zij de Heer
- Jong gemengd koor Immanuel
