= Artz =

Artz may refer to:

- Adolph Artz (1837–1890), Dutch painter
- Lena Clemmons Artz (1891–1976), American botanist
- Wouter Artz (born 1985), Dutch professional football player
- Artz Pedgregal, a shopping mall in Mexico City

== See also ==
- Russell Artzt
