= Johannes Christiaan Karel Klinkenberg =

Dutch painter

Johannes Christiaan Karel Klinkenberg (1852, The Hague – 1924, The Hague), was a 19th-century Dutch painter.

== Biography ==
According to the RKD he was a pupil of Christoffel Bisschop (1828-1904) and Louis Meijer, and became a member of the Pulchri studio who later won many prizes. A street is named after him in the neighborhood of streets named after 19th and 20th century Dutch painters in Overtoomse Veld-Noord, Amsterdam.

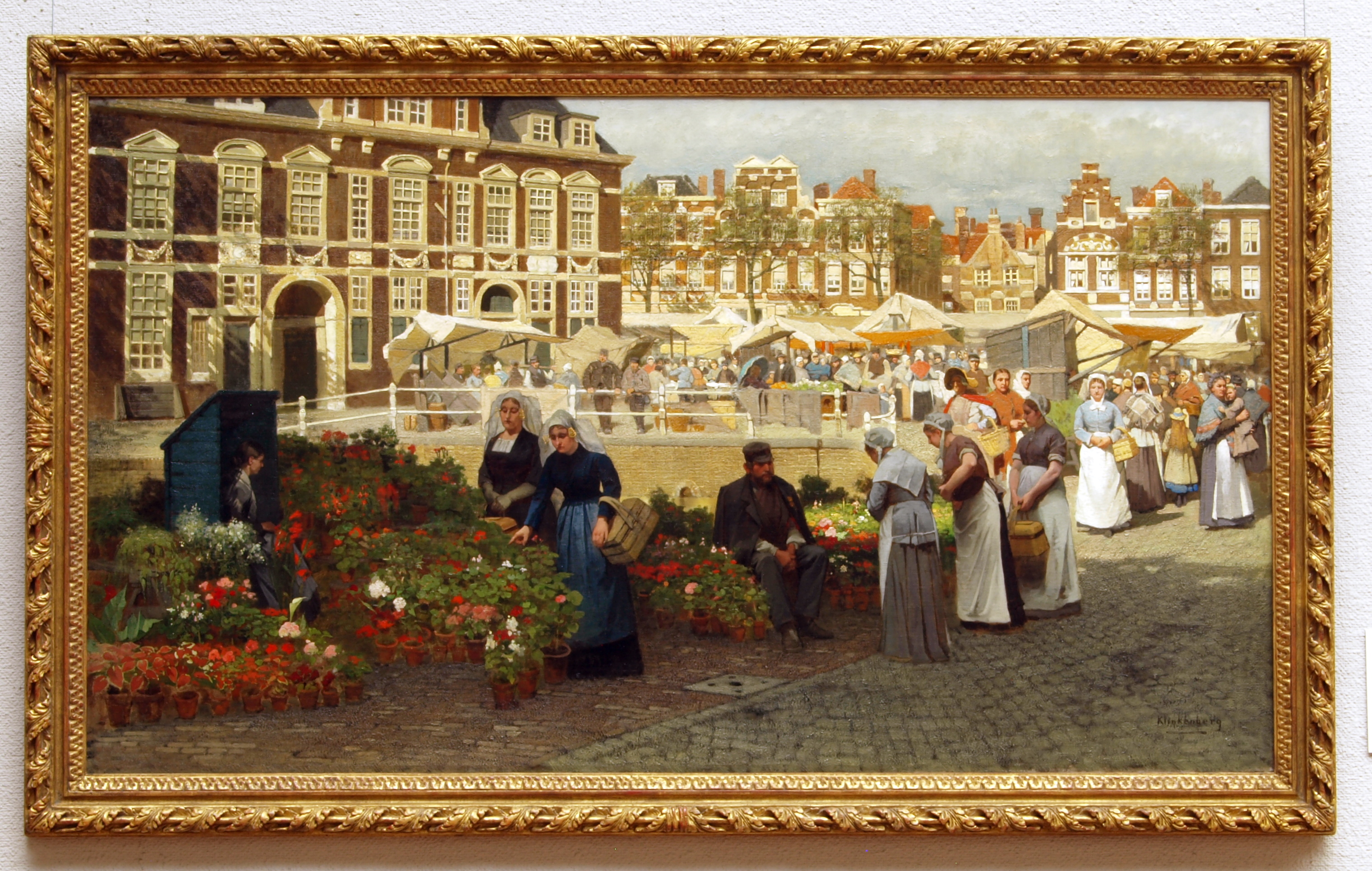
Flower market, collection Teylers Museum

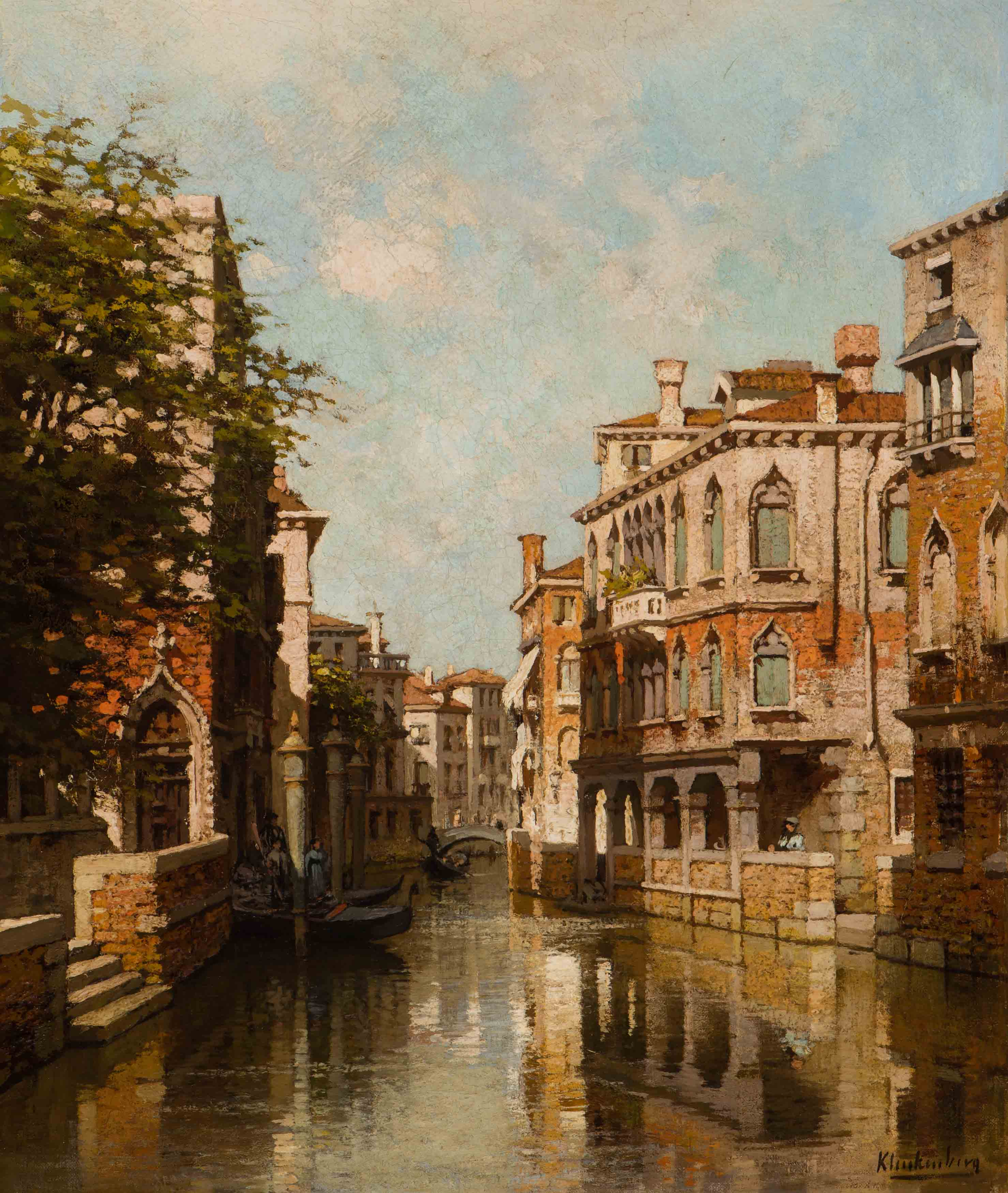
Canal in Venice

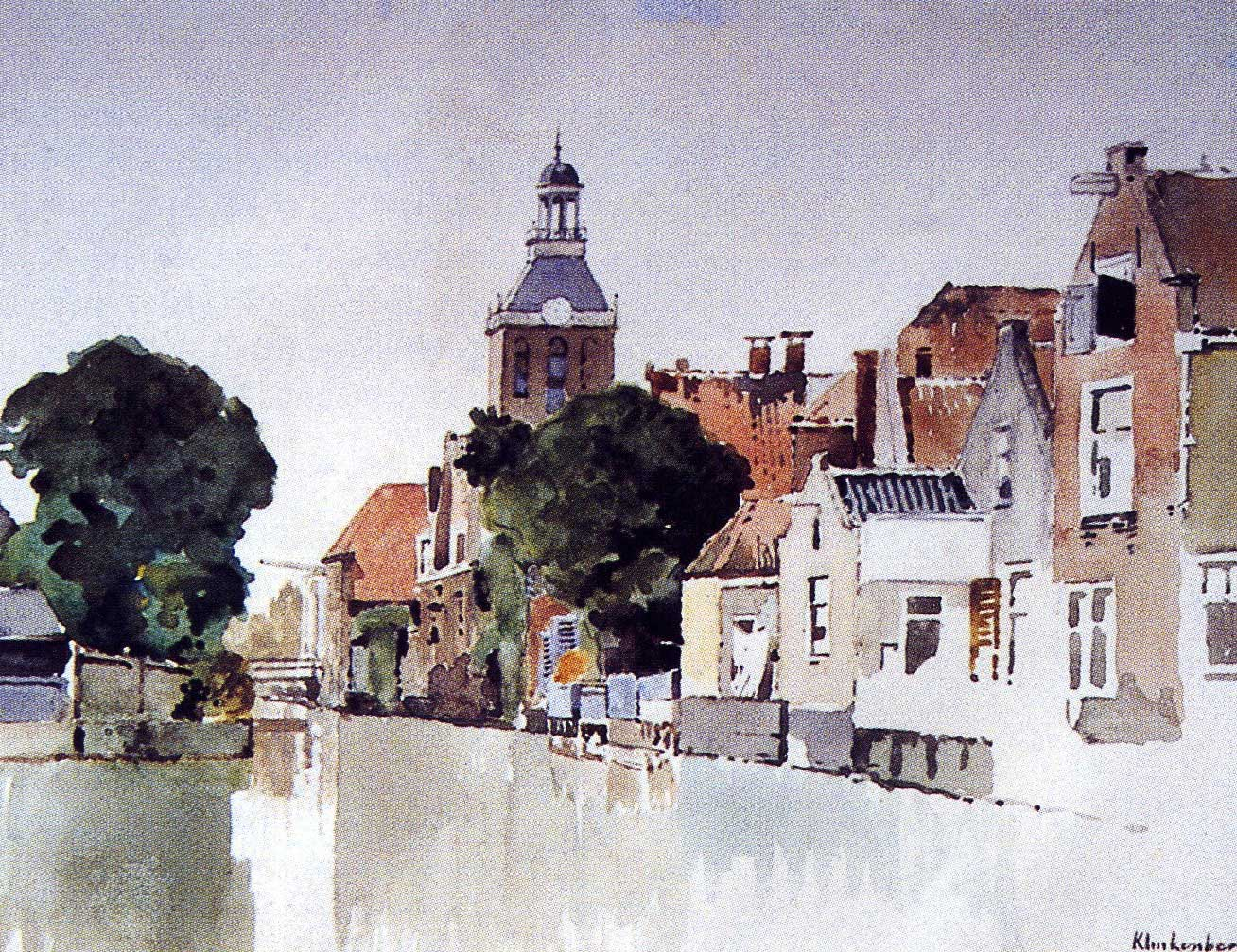
Canal in Meppel

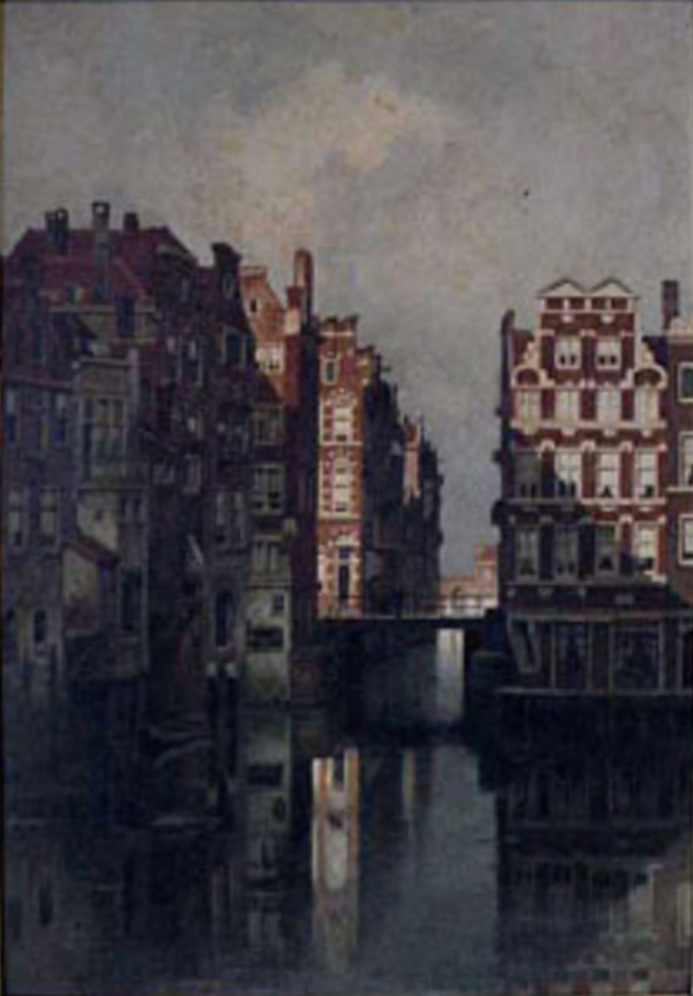
Kolkje Amsterdam
