= De Bisschop =

De Bisschop is a Dutch surname meaning "the bishop". Notable people with the surname include:

- Eric de Bisschop (1891–1958), French seafarer
- Jan de Bisschop (1628–1671) Dutch painter
- Jules De Bisschop (1879–1955), Belgian rower
- Ludovicus de Bisschop (c.1520–1595), Flemish composer

== See also ==
- Bisschop
