= Christoffel Bisschop =

Dutch painter

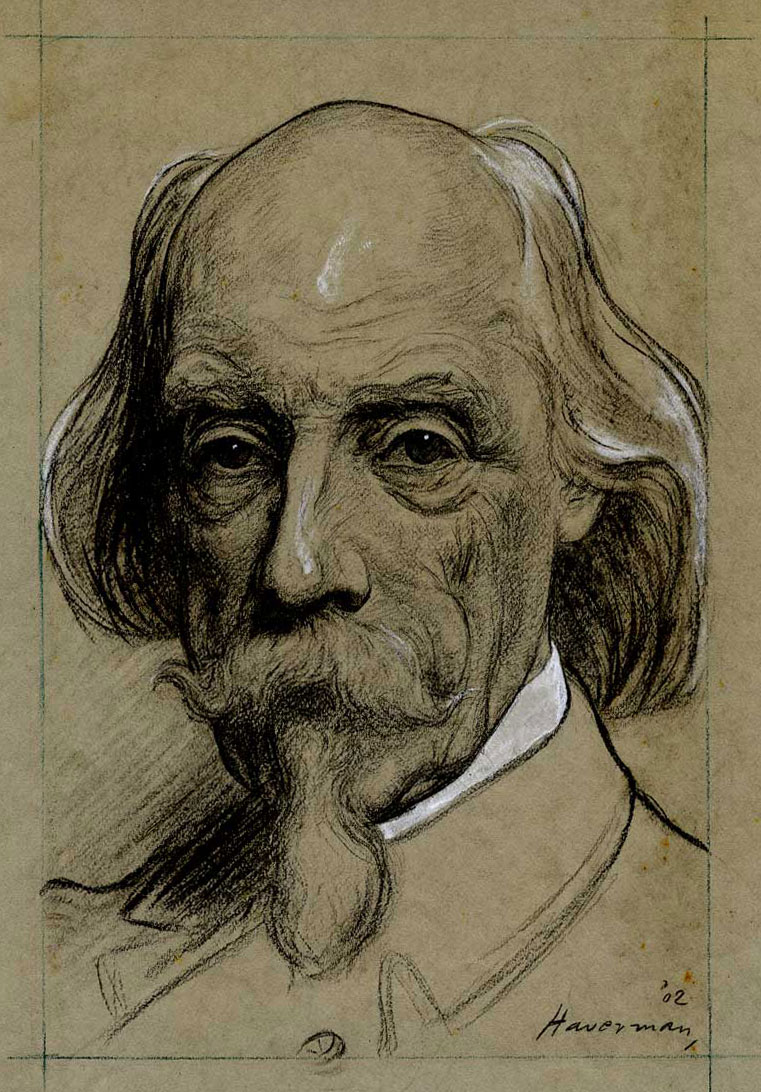
Christoffel Bisschop; portrait by Hendrik Haverman (1902)

Christoffel Bisschop (22 April 1828 – 5 October 1904) was a Dutch painter and lithographer, known primarily for genre scenes and figures.

== Biography ==
He was born in Leeuwarden. His father was a prominent merchant. He had several teachers: in Leeuwarden, he studied with the designer Hendrik Schaaff (1805–1850), in Amsterdam with the painter Jacobus Schoemaker Doyer, and in Delft with the lithographer Willem Hendrik Schmidt (1809–1849). From 1848 to 1852, he studied at the Royal Academy of Art in The Hague, where his instructor was Huib van Hove. From there, he went to Paris, where he took lessons from Charles Gleyre.

In 1855, he established a studio in The Hague and exhibited widely, in the Netherlands as well as France and England. He also had a showing at the Centennial Exposition in Philadelphia. Many of his interior scenes were painted in the city of Hindeloopen, which is known for its preservation of traditional costume.

He was named a Ridder in the Order of the Oak Crown in 1863. Six years later, in Kensington, he married Catharina Swift, who had been his student during visits to England, and they settled in Scheveningen at a villa called "Frisia". She would later become a well-known painter, under the name Kate Bisschop-Swift.

He was a member of the Pulchri Studio and the Hollandsche Teekenmaatschappij, of which his wife was one of the founders. He also took numerous students, including Bernard Blommers, Karel Klinkenberg and his nephew, Richard Bisschop.

He died in The Hague in 1904. Major retrospectives of his work were held in 1905, and in 2008 at the Scheveningen Museum. Many of his belongings were transferred to the Fries Museum and, after Kate's death in 1928, hers and the remainder of his were taken there. The museum display includes a complete reproduction of their workshop.

== Selected paintings ==
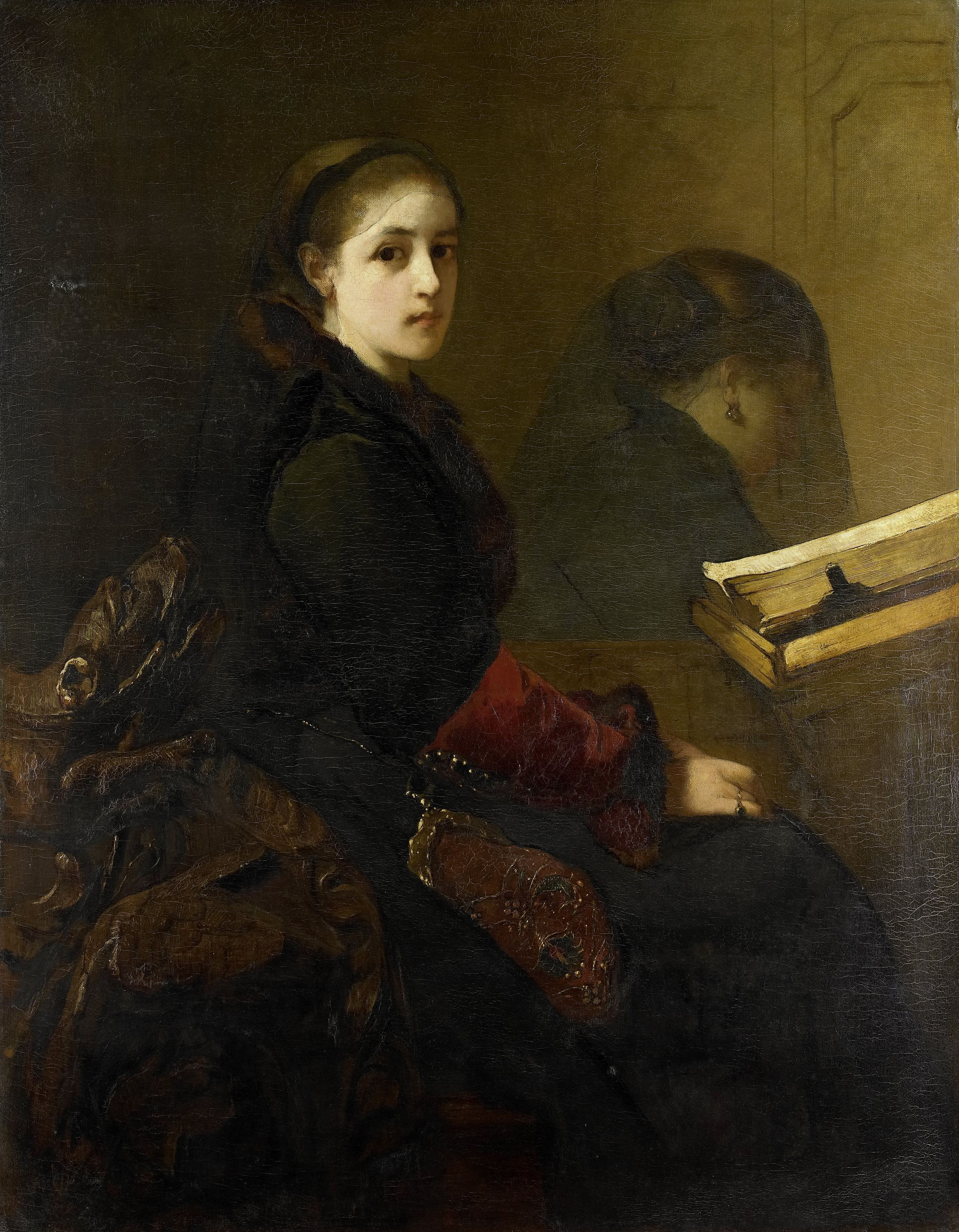
The Disturbed Prayer

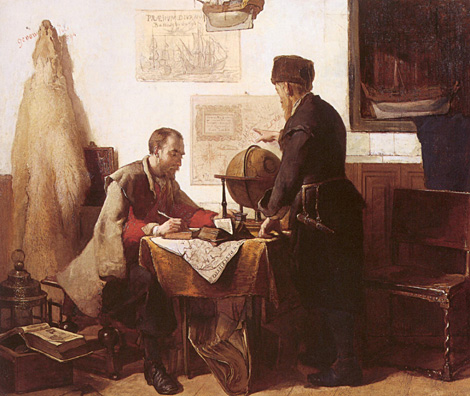
William Barents and
Jacob van Heemskerk

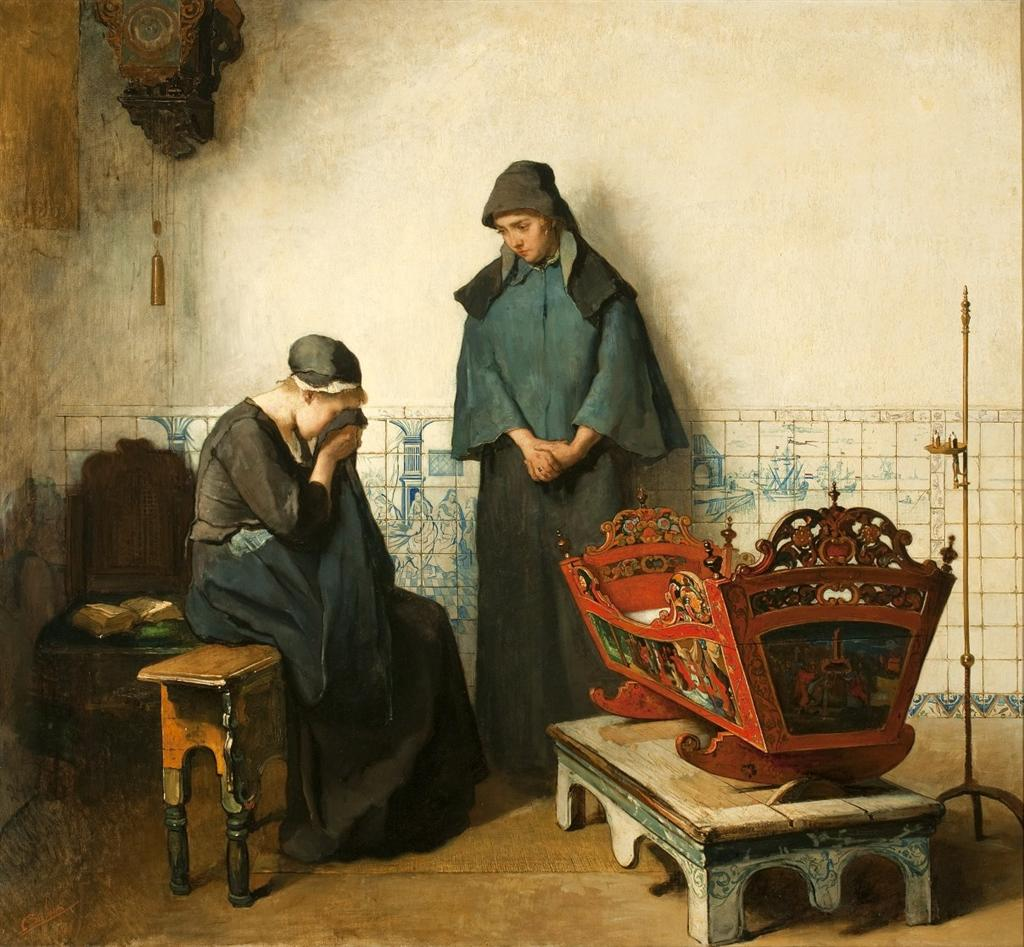
The Lord Gave and the
Lord Took Away

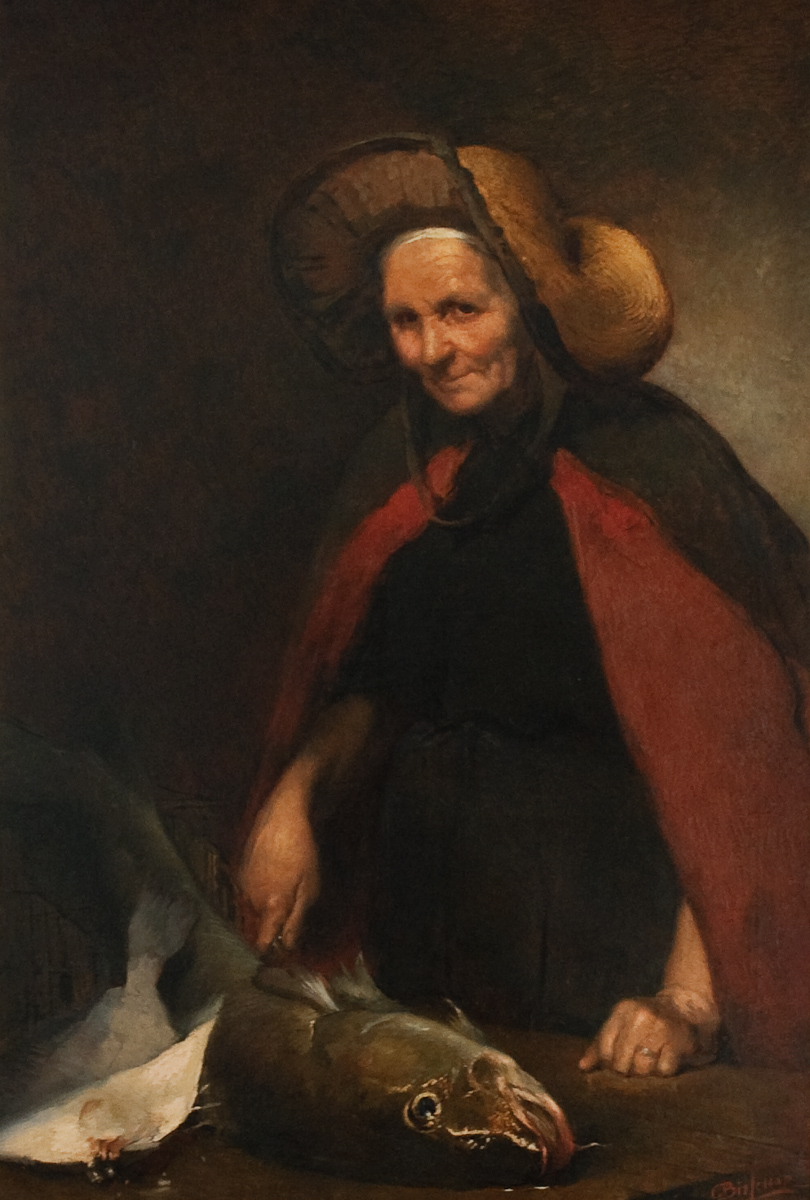
Woman with a Fish
