= Rouveen =

- Flag
- Interactive map of Rouveen
- Coordinates: 52°36′57″N 6°10′51″E
- Country: Netherlands
- Province: Overijssel
- Municipality: Staphorst

Population
  - Estimate: c. 4,000

Rouveen is a village in the Dutch province of Overijssel. It is located in the municipality of Staphorst and about 4 km south-west of the town of that name.

Rouveen and its church featured in documentaries about the resident feminist, Hilligje Kok-Bisschop.

== Gallery ==
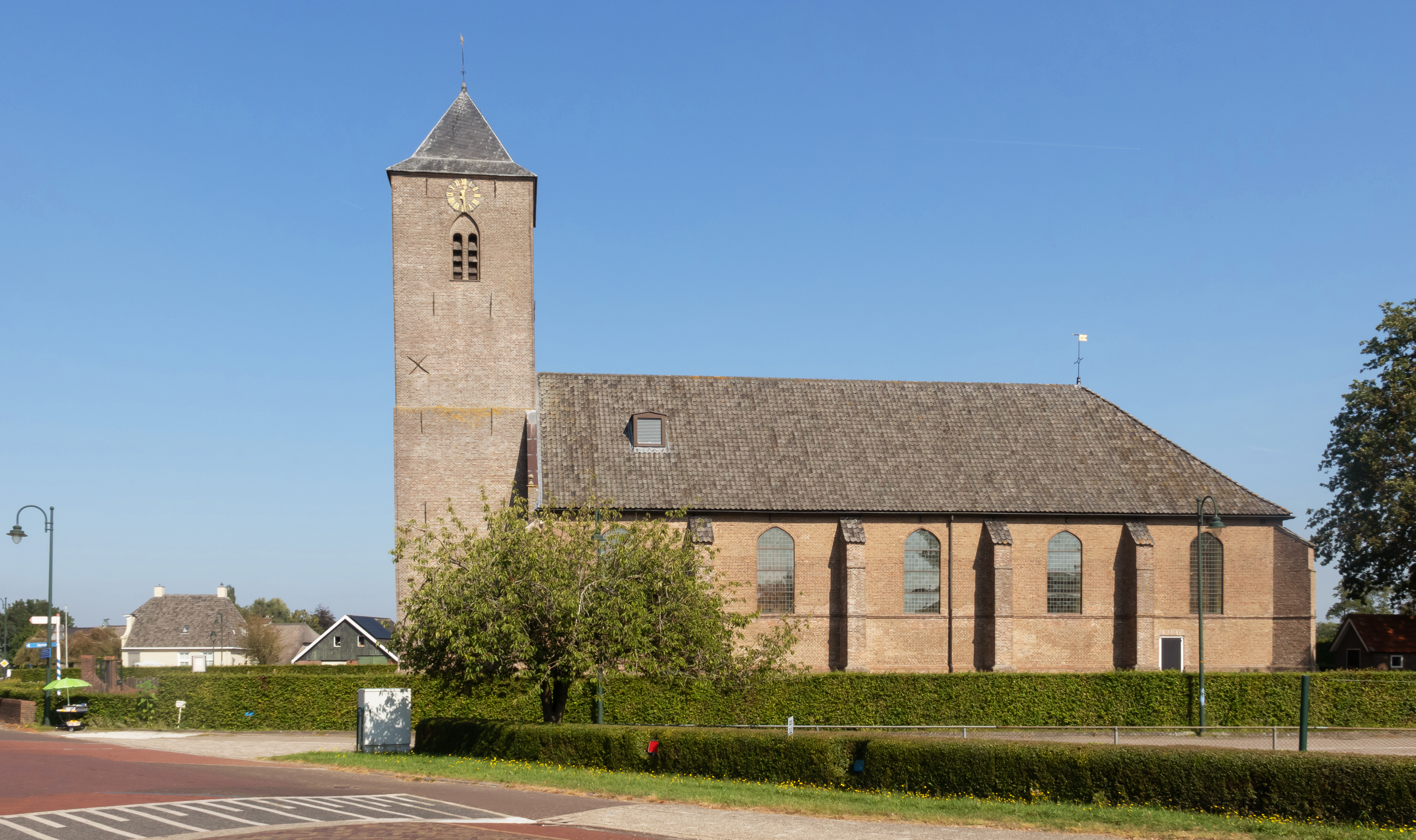
Rouveen, church

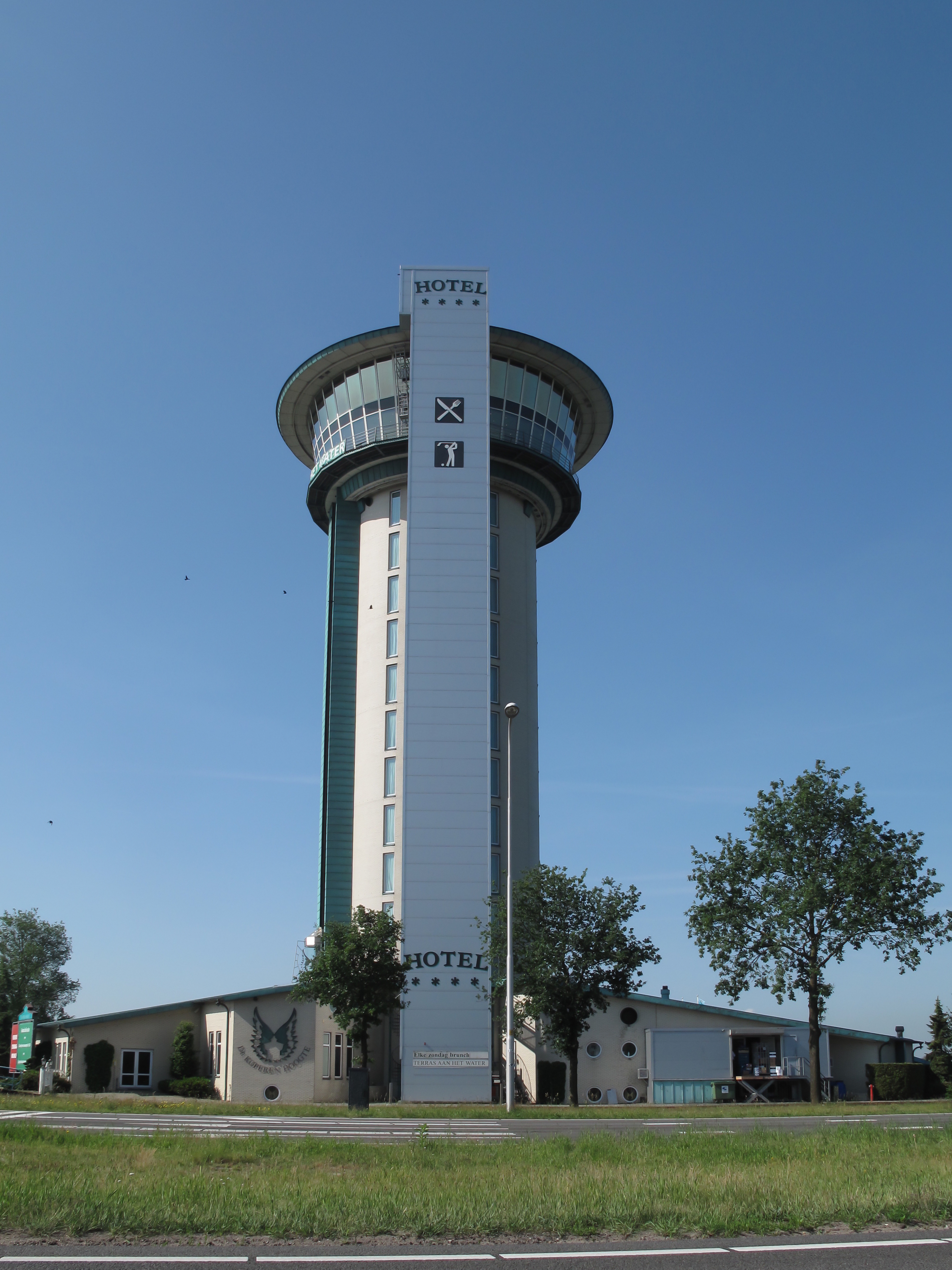
Rouveen, 'Hotel en Restaurant Infinity', formerly hotel 'De Koperen Hoogte'
