= Caroline van Hook Bean =

American painter (1879–1980)

- Born: November 16, 1879; Washington, D.C.
- Died: December 24, 1980 (aged 101); Washington, D.C.
- Movement: American Impressionism

Caroline van Hook Bean (November 16, 1879 – December 24, 1980) was an Impressionist American painter. She is best known for depicting street scenes of New York City and Washington, D.C.

== Early life and education ==
Caroline van Hook Bean was on November 16, 1879 in Washington, D.C to Laurette Van Hook and Tarleton Hoffman Bean, an ichthyologist at the Smithsonian Institution. She first began painting as a child on paper in her father's Smithsonian office. In the 1890s, she moved to New York City, after her father became the director of the New York Aquarium. Around 1893 to 1894, her parents noticed her artistic abilities and sent her to study in Paris, France, where she frequented the Louvre, took lessons from Harry Thompson, and was first introduced to Impressionism. Bean graduated from Smith College in 1903.

== Artistic career ==
After graduating from Smith, Bean briefly attended the St. Louis School of Fine Arts, studying under Edmund H. Wuerpel from 1903-194.

Bean opened her first art studio in 1906 in Washington, D.C., but it was a short-lived venture as she soon followed her family to New York, where her father had been offered a job as the state's head fish culturist. Bean moved to New York City around 1906, where she established a studio and studied at the National Academy of Design under prominent artist William Merritt Chase, as well as Robert Henri, Emil Carlsen, and Kenneth Hayes Miller. In the early 1910s, she traveled to Bermuda, where her family often visited, and met Mary Allen Hulbert Peck, Woodrow Wilson's rumored mistress, whom she would remain close friends to for the rest of her life. She also traveled to Europe to continue studying art in London, Holland, and Italy under painters including John Singer Sargent and Bernard Blommers. She became a more prominent figure in the art world, often exhibiting her work in solo and group shows in museum and galleries in New York and across the country. While living in New York during World War I, Bean created some of her best known work, a series of paintings depicting the city in wartime. This series was brought to prominence again in the 1970s, when it was exhibited in the show "New York City in Wartime" at Chapellier Galleries. Her portraits also became popular with the upper echelons of society, and she received commissions from prominent families such as the DuPonts, Fords, and Kiplingers.

In 1921, she returned to Washington, where she continued to paint, opening a studio in Georgetown. She also developed an interest in home remodeling and restoration, and won first prize in The Evening Star's 1934 Better Homes contest. She was the architect of two houses, both of which she helped build from the ground up. Bean would typically paint each house that she restored. Bean was a member of the Society of Washington Artists, the Society of Washington Etchers, and the Washington Art Club. She continued to paint into her eighties, exhibiting her work at galleries as late as 1967. Her later paintings were influenced by Flemish still life painting methods, and though she painted many subjects, she became known for her flower paintings.

== Personal life ==
In 1913, Bean married Bart Blommers, the son of Bernard Blommers. They divorced in 1918. After moving to Washington D.C., she met English engineer Algernon H. Binyon, whom she was married to from 1927 until his death in 1941.
