= Théophile de Bock =

Dutch painter

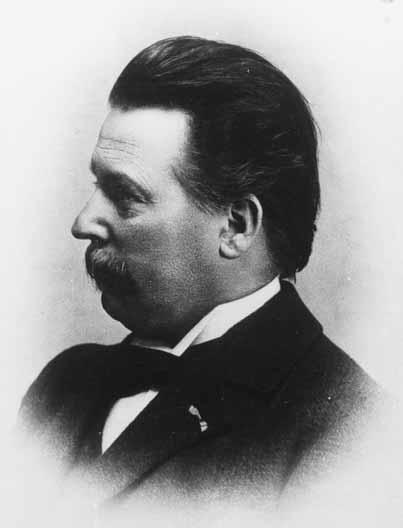
Théophile de Bock

Théophile Emile Achille de Bock (14 January 1851 in The Hague – 22 November 1904 in Haarlem) was a Dutch painter belonging to the Hague School. Although many denigrate De Bock's work as too gray and too sketchy, Hague School champions love his work. Even Van Gogh was convinced of De Bocks "artistic temperament", although he eventually found his choice of subject too limited and tried to get De Bock to paint figure studies. But De Bock stuck to the subject he was good at, the Dutch landscapes.

== Biography ==
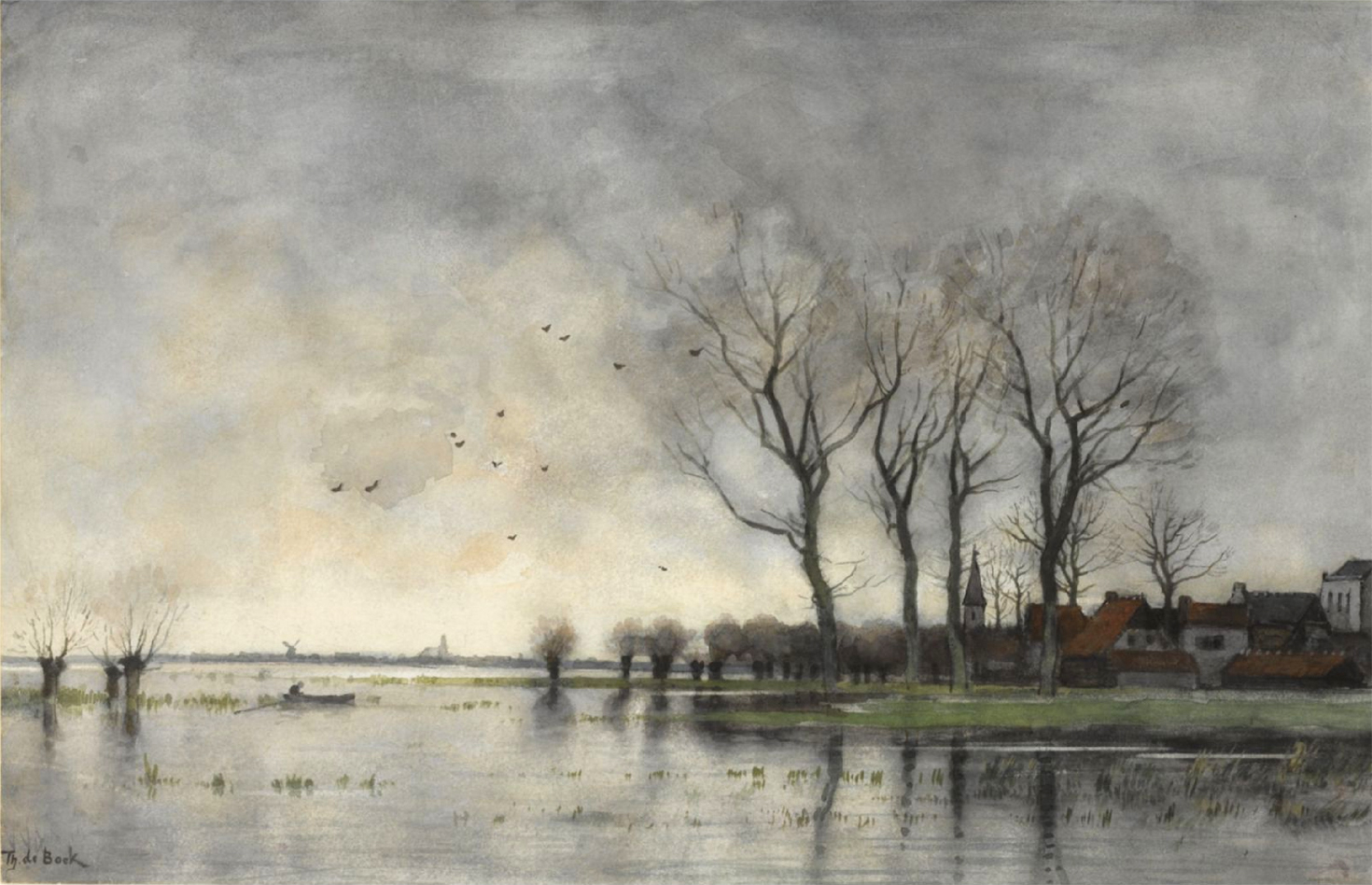
A town on the river Vecht

Born in The Hague, De Bock started out as a clerk for the Dutch Railway Company, but then turned to painting full-time, when the work interfered with his drawing. He trained in The Hague under the landscape painters J.W. van Borselen, J.H. Weissenbruch and Jacob Maris. He also spent time with Willem Maris and probably was one of his students as well.

In 1880, De Bock traveled to Paris and Barbizon where he would often return, perhaps because of his appreciation for the work of Millet and Corot. It was especially Corot and Jacob Maris who would influence De Bock greatly. In 1881 he contributed to the Panorama Mesdag of Hendrik Willem Mesdag, where he painted the sky and dunes. He enticed Van Gogh to come and see the final work, and Van Gogh wrote enthusiastically about it in his letters to his brother Theo.

Around 1880, he worked a great deal in Scheveningen and in the area of Loosduinen, and from 1884, he also visited other areas. In the autumn of 1885, he went to Drente for the first time, and when he returned there the following summer, he took Isaac Israëls with him. His landscapes are often heavy and gloomy, and his oil sketches of the megaliths were often monumental. He wrote, "My idea of life is to reproduce and interpret all that I see and feel to be beautiful around me." Although he hardly ever drew figures, his interest in the farmers was apparent from the number of short stories he wrote about farm life in Drente.

As an alternative to Pulchri Studio, the Hague Art Circle was founded 1891 on the initiative of De Bock. Its goal was to promote the various artistic expressions such as the visual arts, crafts, architecture, music, musical arts and writing. De Bock became chairman of Visual Art and of the board. Although many painters were members of both organizations, the Art Circle offered the generation after 1850 an alternative to the Pulchri Studio, in which the renowned Hague School artists such as Mesdag, Israëls, and Jacob Maris were members. An exhibition organized in 1892 by Jan Toorop, which included works by Vincent van Gogh, was a major success and the avant-garde reputation of the Art Circle was established.

== Gallery ==
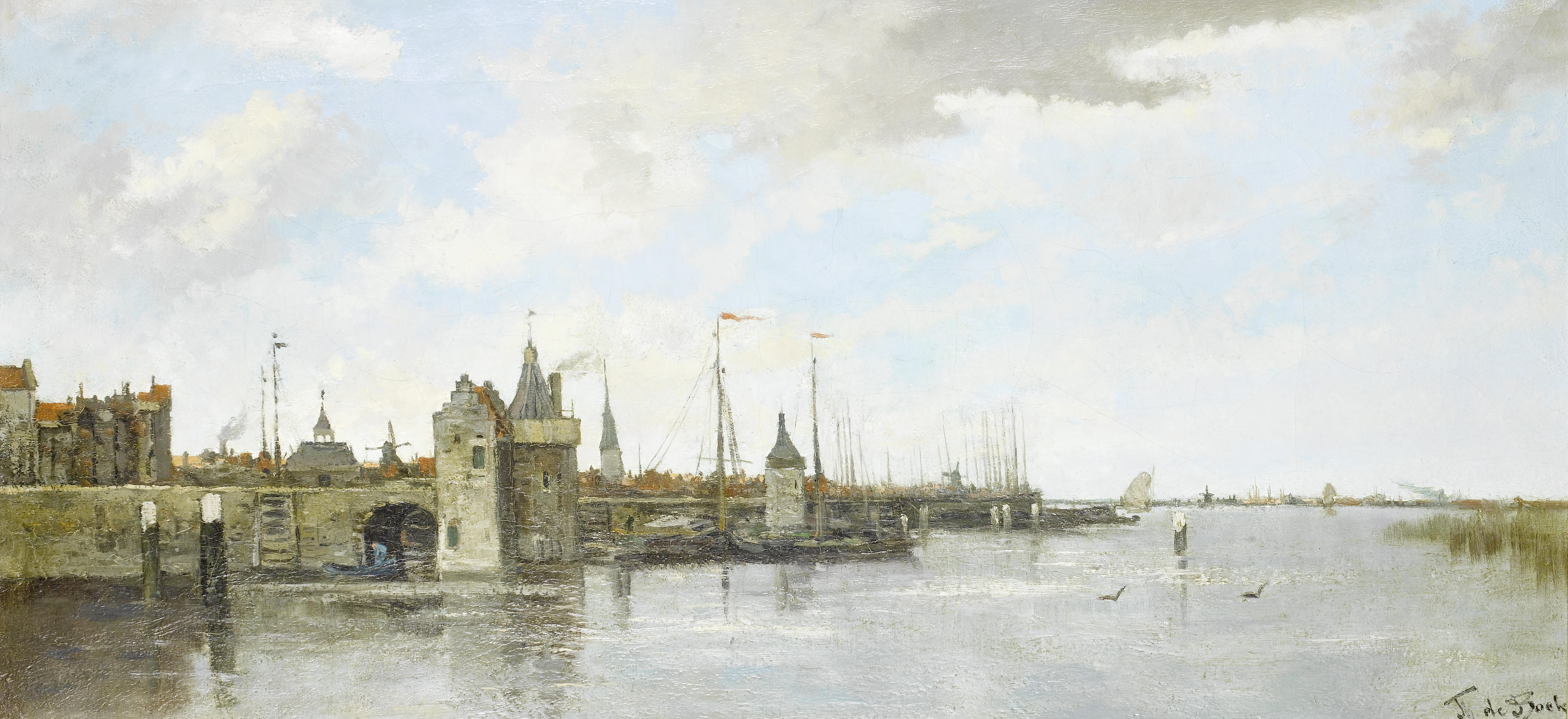
View of Kampen Harbor

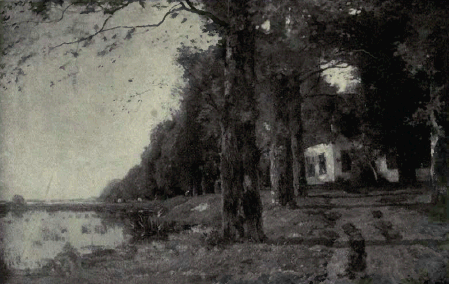
On the Heelsum Road.

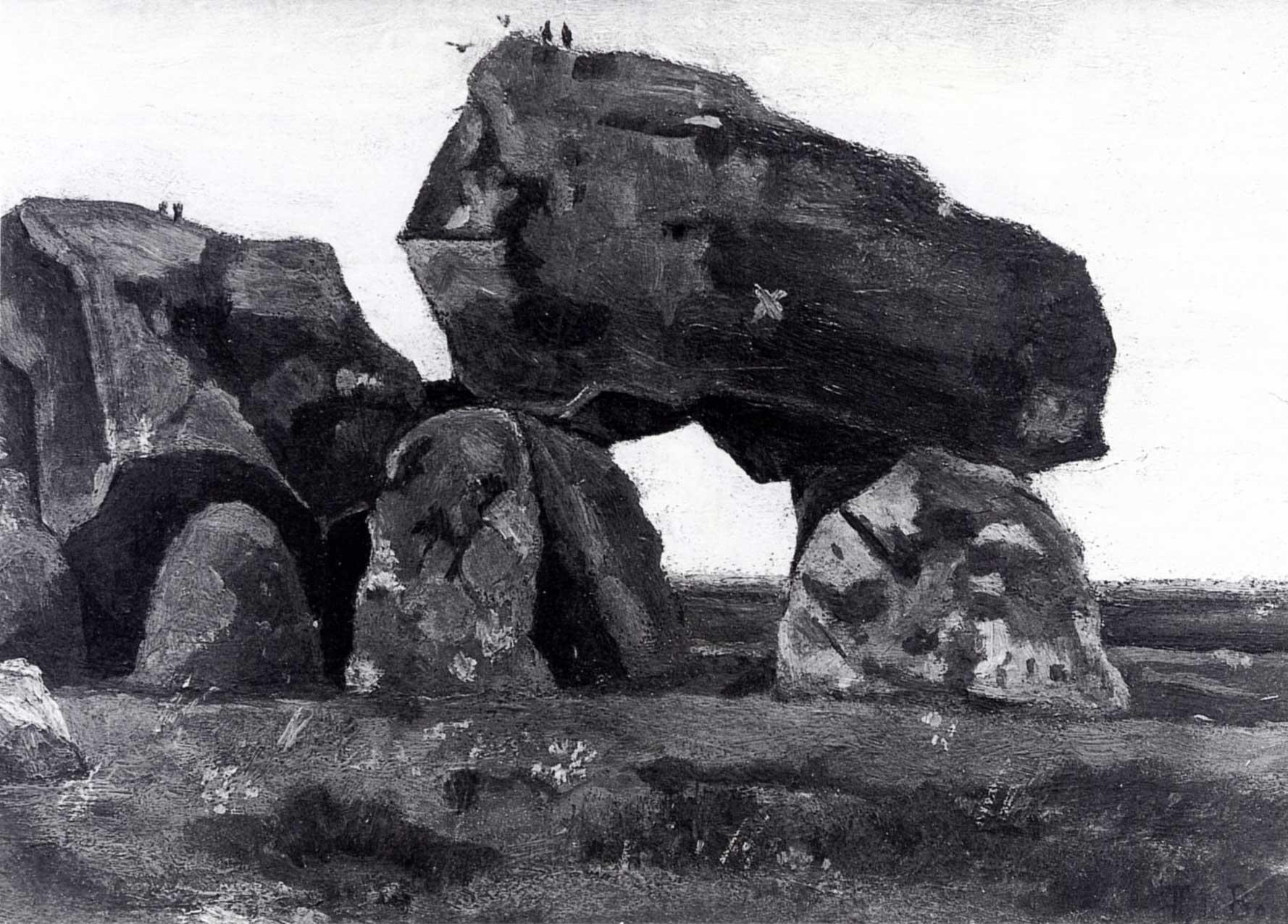
Sketch of Hunnebedden (megalithic monuments).

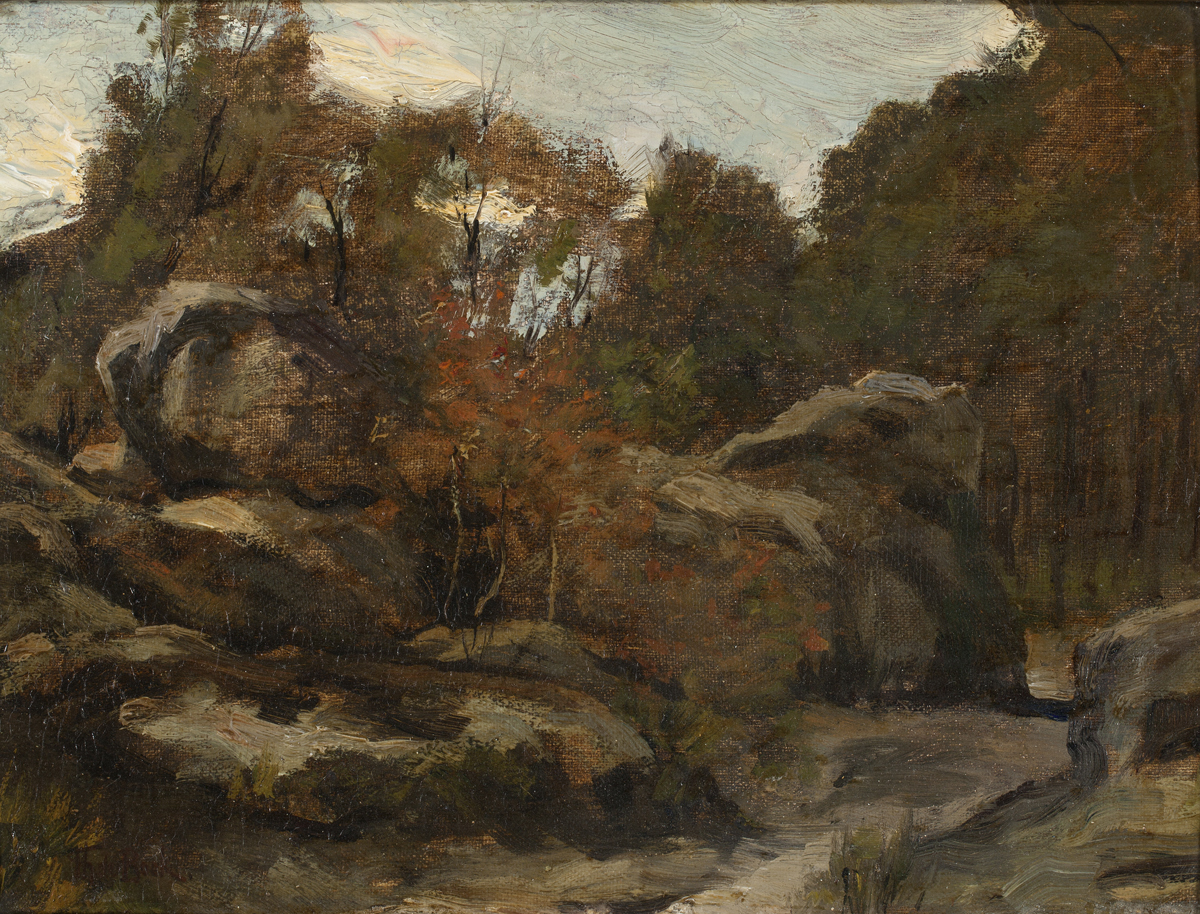
Barbizon, 1880, Coll. Kunsthandel Pygmalion, Maarssen (Netherlands)

== Sources ==
- Sillevis, John and Tabak, Anne, The Hague School Book, Waanders Uitgegevers, Zwolle, 2004 (pp 341–346)
