= Adolph Artz =

Dutch painter and collector

David Adolph Constant Artz
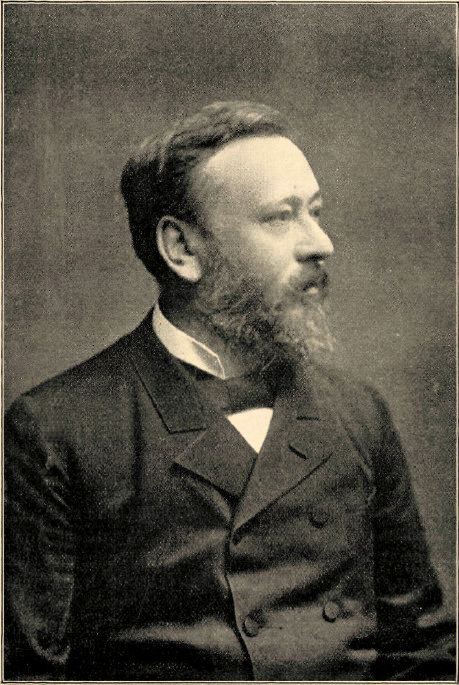
- Born: 18 December 1837; The Hague, Netherlands
- Died: 8 November 1890 (aged 52); The Hague, Netherlands
- Education: Johannes Egenberger, Louis Royer
- Known for: Painting, draftsman
- Movement: Hague School

Signature
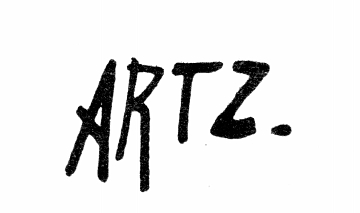

David Adolph Constant Artz (The Hague, 1837 – The Hague, 1890) was a Dutch painter and collector who associated with some members of the Hague School.

== Biography ==
From 1855 to 1864 Artz trained with J.H. Egenberger and Louis Royer at the Amsterdam Academie. There he met Jozef Israëls, whose fishing subjects were to be a lasting source of inspiration for Artz. He worked with Israëls in Zandvoort in 1859. Unlike Israëls, however, Artz depicted only the more cheerful sides of the fisherman's life.

From 1855 to 1864 he was a member of the Rijksakademie van beeldende kunsten in Amsterdam. Technically, he distinguished himself from Israëls in his use of sharp outlines and bright colour. Between 1866 and 1874 Artz stayed in Paris where he set up his own studio at the suggestion of Courbet. Constant Artz, the son Adolph Artz, was born in Paris, France in 1870. Constant Artz followed in his father's footsteps and became a skilled painter.

In Paris he maintained close contacts with his colleagues Jacob Maris and Frederik Hendrik Kaemmerer as well as the art dealer Goupil & Cie. During this period Artz produced mainly fashionable genre scenes and a number of Japanese subjects. His control over line and colour became more powerful.

In 1874 he returned to The Hague where he was a member of the Hollandsche Teekenmaatschappij and in 1879 he was awarded the Order of the Oak Crown by William III of the Netherlands.

== Selected paintings ==
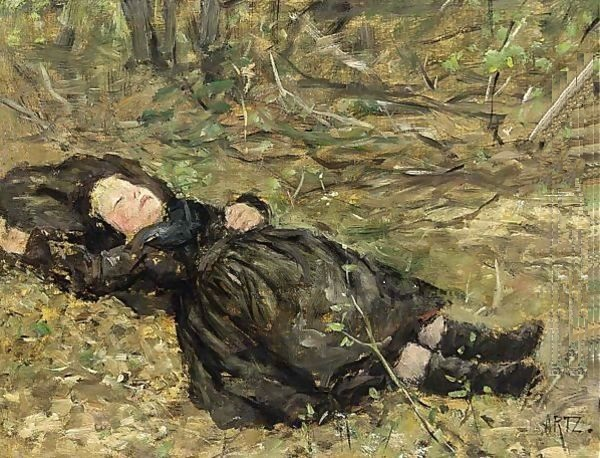
Girl Sleeping in the Woods, 1885

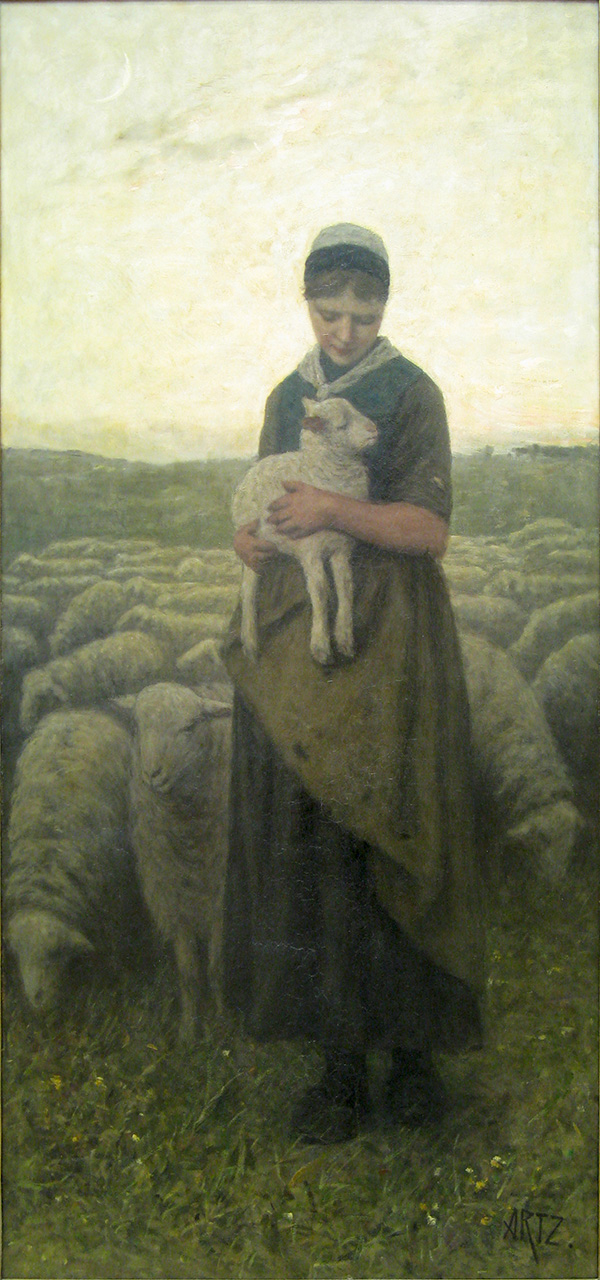
Return of the flock, 1865

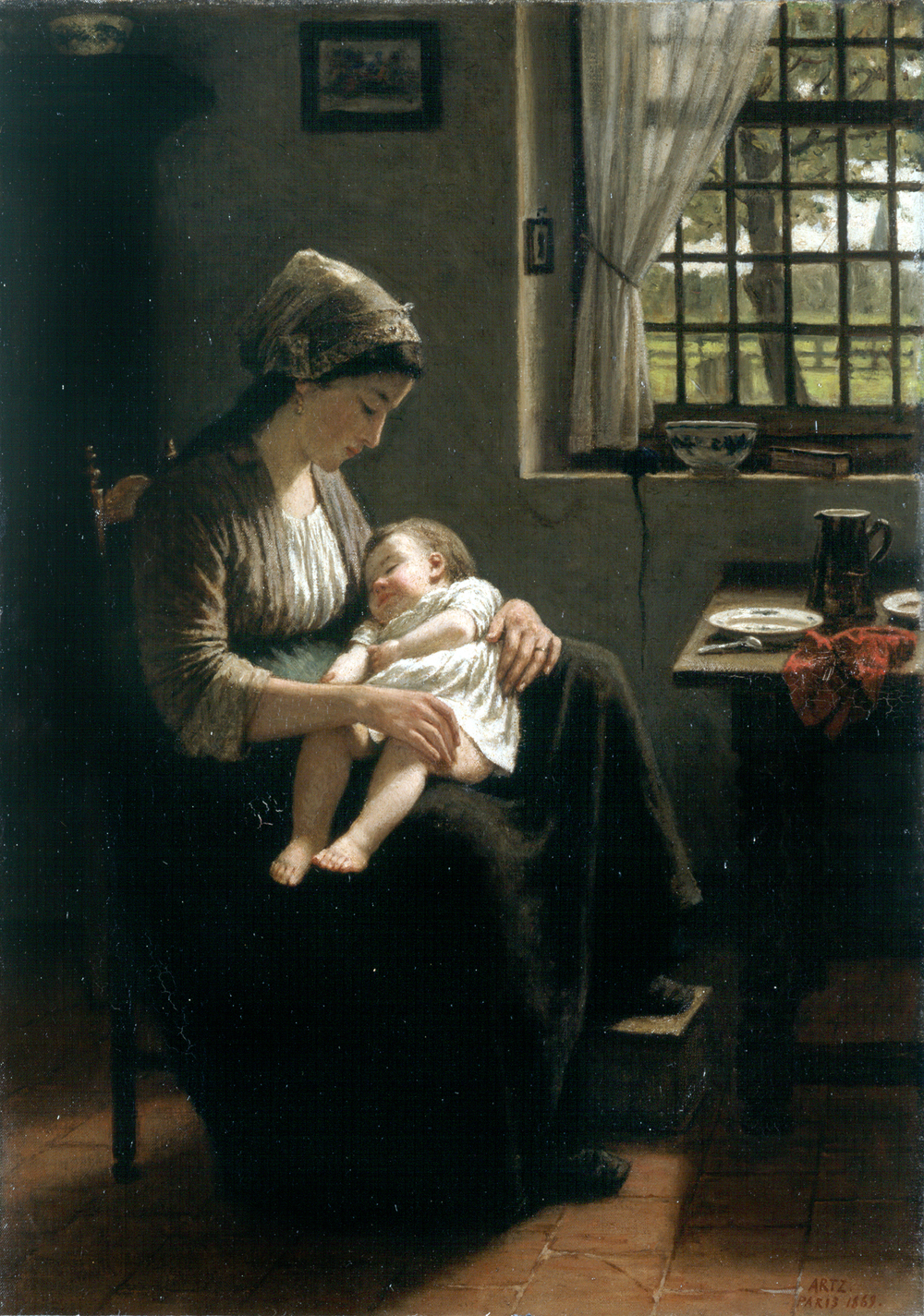
Mother's Joy, 1869

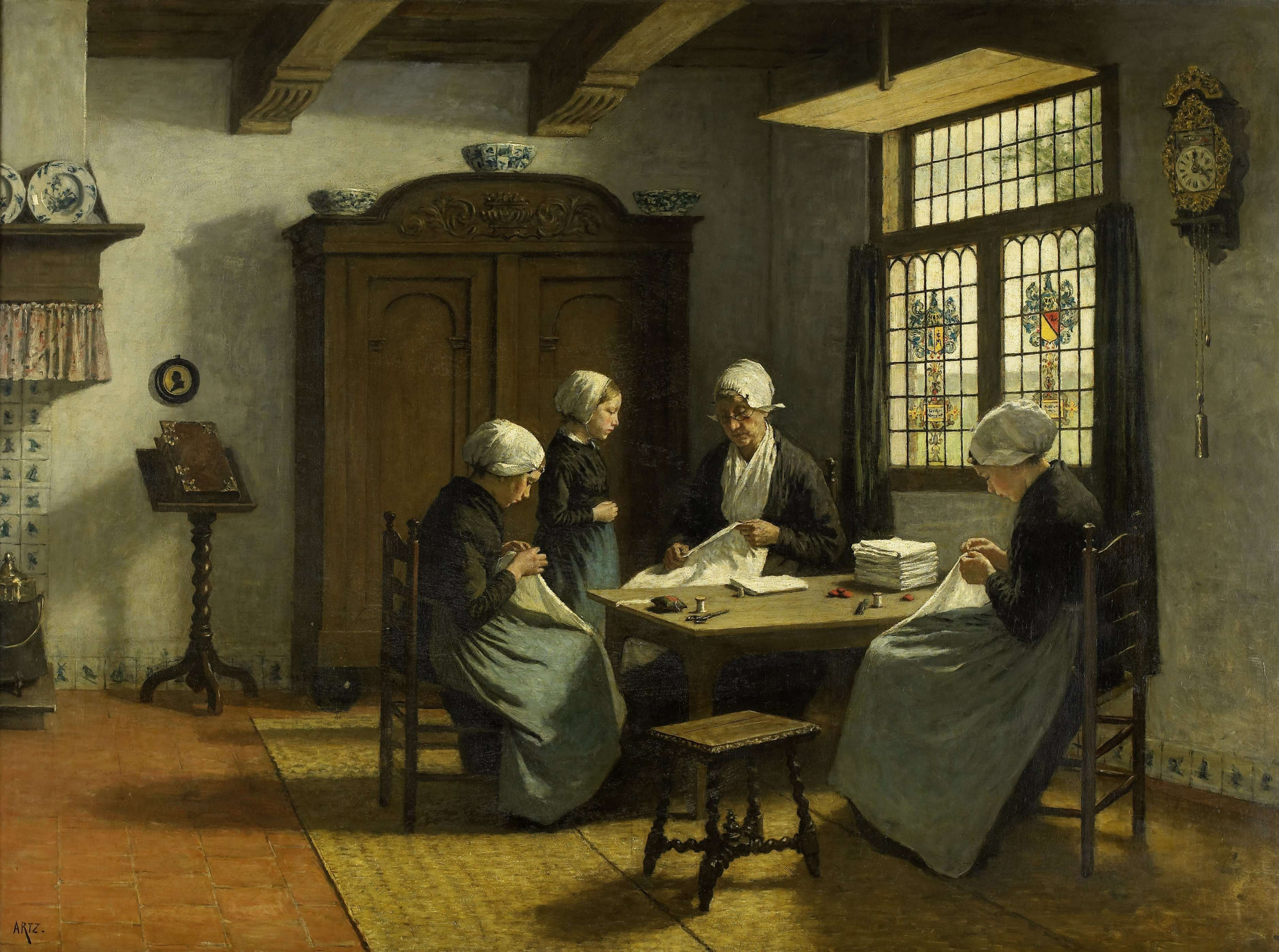
In the orphanage at Katwijk-Binnen, 1870–1890
