= Koos Sinninghe Damsté =

Dutch-Indonesian lawyer and government official

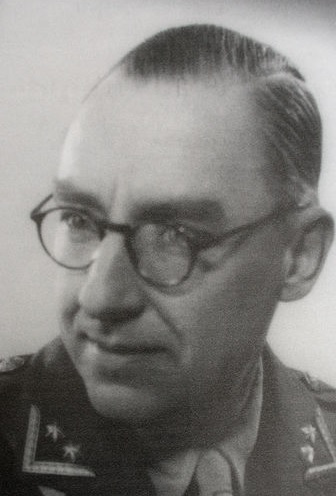
- Born: Jacobus Smede Sinninghe Damsté; 16 July 1902; Huizum, Leeuwarden, Netherlands
- Died: 14 May 1995 (aged 92); Guadalmina, Spain
- Other names: Jacobus Smede Sinninghe Damsté
- Occupation: Lawyer
- Years active: 1927–1967

Jacobus Smede "Koos" Sinninghe Damsté (1902–1995) was a lawyer in colonial Indonesia during 1927–1942, prosecutor of Japanese war criminals during 1946–1947, chairman of the national business association in Indonesia during 1948–1954, and head of the Netherlands Security Service during 1955–1967.

== Life and career ==
=== 1902–1926 Youth and education ===
Sinninghe Damsté was born in Huizum, near Leeuwarden on 16 July 1902. He was the son of Willem Sinninghe Damsté (1869–1952), a medical practitioner, and Barbara Bakker (1872–1909). His parents married in October 1901 but separated soon after his birth when his mother returned to her native Zaandam. Damsté completed high school in Leeuwarden in 1921 and his undergraduate studies in Law at the University of Groningen in 1926. He then migrated to Indonesia to work as a lawyer in the city of Surabaya.

=== 1927–1940 Lawyer in Surabaya ===
To avoid being drafted for military training after arrival in Indonesia, Damsté first completed partial military service in the Netherlands in 1926. He then departed for Surabaya to work as a lawyer and solicitor at the long-established law office of P. Leendertz and M.J. van Nieuwkuyk.

Damsté's professional life was relatively uneventful, although various newspaper reports associate his name with regular appearances in court to defend cases, which indicates that he had a good reputation as a lawyer in East Java. He also was legal consultant of subsidiaries foreign firms in colonial Indonesia, such as German firm IG Farbenindustrie AG, whose subsidiary in Surabaya produced soap and perfume. And he arbitraged legal disputes at his office.

Damsté was active in Surabaya society. During 1930–1932 as councillor in the city council of Surabaya for the conservative Dutch Patriotic Association (Vaderlandsche Club), until he was granted furlough with his family to Europe for several months during 1932–33. Upon return, he became chairman of the East Java branch of the Patriotic Association during 1936–1937, and an advocate of the reinforcement of the defence capabilities of colonial Indonesia. In 1936 he was Secretary of the Surabaya branch of the Netherlands Indies Association for Mountaineering (Nederlandsch–Indische Vereeniging voor de Bergsport). During 1937-–1941 he was Secretary and later President of the private ‘Simpang Club’, the bulwark of European presence in Surabaya society.

=== 1940–1945 Soldier and prisoner of war ===
In May 1940 Damsté was called up for service in the home guard (Landstorm) in Surabaya as a sergeant. Home guard duties were a compulsory part-time duty for all Dutchmen in the Netherlands Indies aged 32–45. After following military training, Damsté resumed his legal work, taking on some new duties, such as the management of foreign companies requisitioned as enemy property, until all home guard recruits were mobilised at the start of the Japanese advance towards Indonesia in December 1941.

After the surrender of colonial Indonesia in March 1942, Damsté became a prisoner of war of the Japanese. Together with other prisoners of war, he was transported to the Maluku Islands to construct air fields during April–December 1943. He was interned in Jakarta during January–May 1944, and forced to work on the notorious Sumatra Railway at Pekanbaru during May 1944 to August 1945. He sought to keep the morale of his fellow captives up during captivity. Damsté's memoires recount the atrocities which he and other prisoners of war suffered at the hands of their captors.

=== 1946-1947 Prosecutor of Japanese war criminals ===
After the Japanese surrender in August 1945, Damsté was reunited with his family in Jakarta in November 1945. He became administrator of the Cikini Hospital in Jakarta until May 1946. The Dutch colonial government selected him in March 1946 for the position of assistant prosecutor at the International Military Tribunal for the Far East in Tokyo, which prosecuted Japanese war criminals. For that purpose Damsté was appointed lieutenant colonel in the colonial army (Royal Netherlands East Indies Army). His task was to research and coordinate the Dutch indictment against Japanese war crimes in Indonesia, together with lawyer Klaas Abel de Weerd (1904–1987). The tribunal lasted until November 1948, but Damsté's tenure ended in February 1947 after the Dutch indictment had been delivered.

=== 1947–1954 President of business associations ===
Upon his return to Jakarta, Damsté was demobilised and appointed President of the General Agricultural Syndicate (Algemeen Landbouw Syndicaat, ALS), an organisation of large agricultural companies in Indonesia. One of the pressing issues he dealt with was the unsafety that plantation managers in rural areas experienced after estates resumed operations following the first Dutch military action in July 1947. The plantations were under regular attack from gangs of Indonesian nationalists and also outright criminals. As police and military were unable – or unwilling, according to Damsté – to prevent the killings of Indonesian plantation personnel, he worked to organise a solution that took the form of armed enterprise militia.

As ALS President, Damsté took a seat on the board of the Association of Entrepreneurs in Indonesia (Ondernemersbond voor Indonesië, OBI), which had been without an executive President and Chairman since the resignation of Carel de Villeneuve in January 1947. After establishing his reputation as ALS President, Damsté was appointed interim OBI President in April 1948, and then full-time OBI President and chairman of the OBI board in September 1948. Unlike his predecessor as OBI President, Damsté did not have a public profile and remained somewhat of an enigma to outsiders. The difference between the two was that Damsté had been a practising lawyer in the 1930s, while De Villeneuve had been a representative of the private sector during the 1930s and an outspoken member of parliament (Volksraad) during 1938–1942.

The OBI records reveal that Damsté was diligent and meticulous in carrying out the duties of OBI President, in terms of his communications to OBI members and representing the views of private enterprise on policy matters to governments in Indonesia and to government departments. As OBI President, he secured OBI's material support for the enterprise militia that he had helped to create in 1947.

Like his predecessor De Villeneuve, Damsté was supportive of the Indonesian call for independence, understanding that the tide of history was on the side of Indonesian people. His understanding of his task as OBI President was to safeguard the interests of private enterprise, both in the interest of the Indonesian economy, as well as the companies themselves. Nevertheless, in 1948 Damsté was appointed chairman of the committee for financial-economic issues of the association of Indonesian states. It prepared the blueprint for the Financial-Economic Agreement between the Netherlands and Indonesia that was signed in December 1949.

In essence, Damsté's perception of OBI's role continued to be that the private sector had to be loyal to Indonesia's government, but not uncritical, and that OBI's purpose continued to be to safeguard private sector interests, both in the interest of the Indonesian economy and society, and the companies themselves.

On occasion, Damsté aired views in public as OBI President during public speeches or press conferences. For example, in a speech in the Netherlands in 1952, he pointed to reservations among companies in Indonesia about the capabilities of new Indonesian government, and mentioned that the recovery plans of Minister of Finance Sumitro had come under criticism. Indonesian newspaper Pedoman rebuked his views, noting that recent government policies were directed against the ‘monopoly position’ of Dutch enterprises in the Indonesian economy.

Damsté organised and chaired the Foundation for Dutch Education (Stichting voor het Nederlands Onderwijs) in Jakarta. It was established in 1950 to sustain Dutch-language education at 110 private schools across Indonesia, in order to encourage Dutch expatriates to continue to work in private enterprise in Indonesia.

No interviews with Damsté were published that provided public insights in his activities and his motivation during his OBI Presidency. Even at his farewell in June 1955, newspapers could only report the barest minimum of Damsté's biographical information. This lack of public profile suited Damsté's next career choice after OBI members dissolve the association in 1954 in favour of a new Dutch Chamber of Commerce in Indonesia.

=== 1955–1967 (Deputy) Head of the Netherlands Security Service ===
In April 1955 Damsté accepted an offer to become deputy head of the Netherlands Security Service (Binnenlandse Veiligheidsdienst, BVD) and he returned to the Netherlands. In April 1961 he succeeded Louis Einthoven as Head of the BVD. Little is known about Dams's work at the BVD, as the organisation eschewed public interaction about its work. Much of it was in the 1950s and 1960s focused on monitoring and analysing political operations at both far ends of the Dutch political spectrum. Following the internationalisation of the interests of the Communist Party of the Netherlands (Communistische Partij Nederland, CPN), particularly CPN support for the Soviet Union during the Cuban Missile Crisis in 1962, Damsté arranged in the early 1960s for the BVD to develop a better understanding of the international dimensions of communism.

Internally, Damsté sought to lower the existing thresholds in the BVD between superiors and subordinates in order to encourage more constructive contributions from subordinates in the security service. Externally, the BVD experienced increasing criticism in Dutch newspapers and parliament for its secrecy, covert monitoring of Dutch citizens and intransparent involvement in screening public service appointments. Damsté's response was: ‘The dogs bark, but the caravan moves on.’ In other words, his view was that the BVD had to focus on its operations, and that there was no need for concern or response.

One of the secret investigations that Damsté was in 1965 into the antecedents of the future fiancé of the Dutch crown princess Beatrix, the German Claus Georg von Amsberg.

The only exception to the rule of BVD secrecy was Damsté's 1964 response to public criticism of the BVD expressed by a committee of the Association of Academic Researchers (Verbond van Wetenschappelijke Onderzoekers) in the Netherlands in its journal Wetenschap en Samenleving (December 1963). This report assessed the purpose and procedures of secret BVD investigations into the political antecedents for appointments to public office, particularly at Dutch universities. In a personal capacity, Damsté published a reply in the journal, suggesting that the committee's reference to ‘radicals’ referred to people with communist sympathies. This issue continued to follow Damsté around. In 1967 he still had to deny that the BVD investigated the political antecedents of academics at Dutch universities. He retired from the BVD in September 1967.

== Personal, family, honours and death ==
There are few observations of Damsté's personality. In 1930 a journalist described him thus: ‘Sinninghe Damsté has a calm appearance, balanced and controlled. He speaks in a thoughtful and well-considered manner.’ His memoires of the 1940s also reveal Damsté as a calm observer, unflappable despite personal hardship, unimpressed by posturing, intolerant of inconsistency and gibberish, analysing issues by dissecting them to their essence, and reporting them in a matter of fact and un-emotive manner.

Damsté married Johanna Philippine Aletta Greebe (1898–1935) in Surabaya on 16 February 1928. They had two sons; Willem ‘Pim’ (1931-2008) and Cornelis Aleidus Arnoldus Johannes ‘Hans’ (1933–1989). Greebe died at a young age in 1935 Damsté remarried during his second furlough to Europe with Maria Eleonora ‘Miep’ Overbosch (1912–1990) in Arnhem on 17 September 1938. They had one son; Dick (1938).

Damsté was appointed Knight of the Order of the Netherlands Lion (Ridder in de Orde van de Nederlandse Leeuw) in 1951 and Commander of the Order of the Netherlands Lion (Commandeur in de Orde van de Nederlandse Leeuw) in 1968

In retirement, Damsté initially lived in The Hague 1967–1978, and subsequently in Southern Spain, particularly in San Pedro de Alcantara. He died in Guadalmina (Spain) on 14 May 1995. In 1986, he self-published his memoires of his experiences during the 1940s. His son Pim organised for them to be posthumously re-published.
