= Richard Bisschop =

Dutch painter

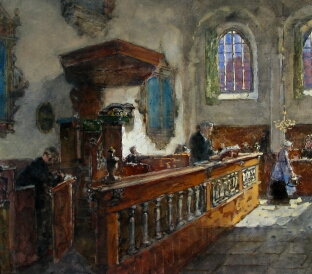
Village Church - Before the Sermon (1890s)

Richard Bisschop (21 June 1849 – 22 March 1926) was a Dutch painter, graphic artist and watercolorist.

== Biography ==
He was born in Leeuwarden. His father was a hardware merchant. Bisschop originally trained to be an engineer, but was always interested in art because his uncle, Christoffel Bisschop and aunt, Kate Bisschop-Swift were painters. At the age of twenty-two, he decided to follow their example and take up art professionally. He began his studies with his uncle, then attended the Rotterdam Academy of Fine Arts (now the Willem de Kooning Academy) and specialized in genre scenes, portraits, cityscapes and interiors; especially churches.

When the painter Johannes Bosboom died in 1891, Bisschop was permitted to paint him while he was lying in his coffin and make a sketch of his workshop. He worked successively in Rotterdam and The Hague, where he became a member of the Pulchri Studio.

In 1892, he married the artist Suze Robertson, one of the Amsterdamse Joffers. Their daughter, Sara Bisschop, also became a painter of interiors, animals and marine scenes.

Bisschop died in 1926 in Bergen. In addition to several Dutch museums, many of his works were acquired by the American Art Association in New York (now a division of Sotheby's).
