= Hilligje Kok-Bisschop =

Dutch activist (born 1948)

Hilligje Kok-Bisschop (born 1948) is a Dutch activist from Staphorst for emancipation of orthodox Christian women.

On 26 April 2013, she received the Order of Orange-Nassau for her work in advocating the rights of women in the Dutch orthodox Christian community. She had previously been shunned from her local church for lobbying in The Hague for female representation in the Christian SGP political party. She received the award thanks to a documentary made about her by the Dutch filmmaker Emile van Rouveroy van Nieuwaal, who himself was awarded the same order on 24 April 2015, mostly for his documentaries based on her work. His first documentary about her, 'Staphorst in tegenlicht', aired in 2007.

In 2014, she was asked to share her favorite texts on the Dutch television program 'Het Vermoeden', a program dedicated to interviews by Annemiek Schrijver with various figures about their favorite holy texts. She said her motto was a line by Dutch poet M. Vasalis 'Niet het snijden doet zo’n pijn, maar het afgesneden zijn.' (it is not the cutting off that is painful, but being cut off). Her favorite holy text is Psalm 3, verse 3: I lay down and slept; I woke again, for the Lord sustained me. I will not be afraid of many thousands of people who have set themselves against me all around.

== Documentaries ==
- 'Staphorst in tegenlicht', 2007
- 'Houdt God van vrouwen?', 2013
