= Kate Bisschop-Swift =

English-born Dutch painter (1834–1928)

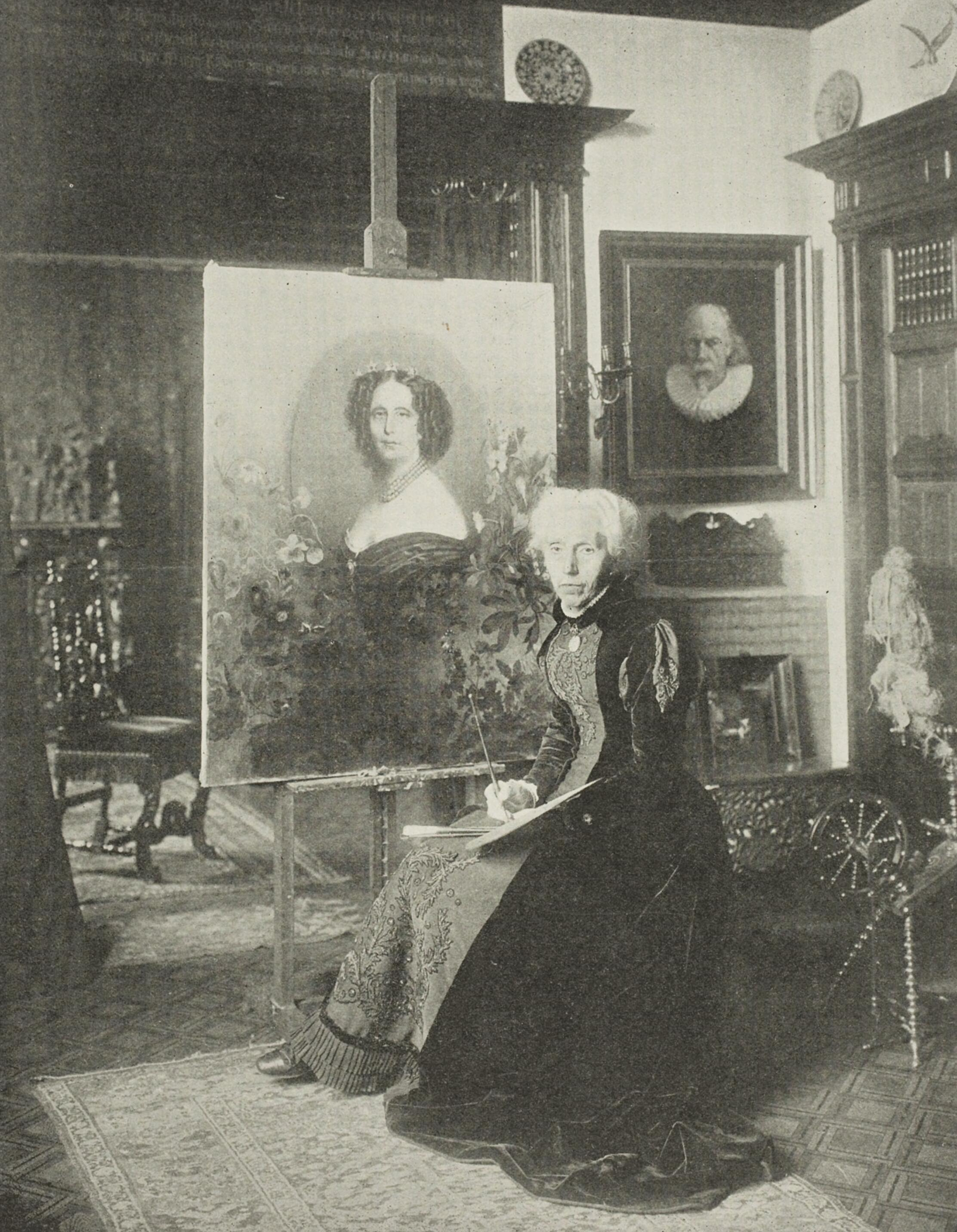
- Bisschop-Swift in 1902
- Born: 6 April 1834; London, England
- Died: 16 May 1928 (aged 94); The Hague, Netherlands
- Occupation: Painter

Catharina Seaton Foreman Bisschop-Swift, known as Kate (1834–1928) was an English-born Dutch painter, known primarily for her domestic scenes and still-lifes.

== Biography ==
She was largely self-taught. In the late 1860s, she took some lessons from the Dutch painter, Christoffel Bisschop. They were married in January 1869, and she went with him to the Netherlands. They lived in Scheveningen at a villa named "Frisia", although she worked mostly in Leeuwarden.

In 1874, together with Gerardina Jacoba van de Sande Bakhuyzen, Sientje van Houten and Margaretha Roosenboom, she painted the "Haagse weeskinderen" (Hague Orphans), as a gift for Queen Sophie on the occasion of the 25th jubilee of Sophie's husband, King William III. Two years later, she was a co-founder of the Hollandsche Teekenmaatschappij; exhibiting regularly throughout The Hague as well as at the Stedelijk Museum. Bisschop-Swift exhibited her work at the Palace of Fine Arts at the 1893 World's Columbian Exposition in Chicago, Illinois.

Her husband died in 1904. She was named an honorary member of the "Royal Frisian Society for History and Culture" in 1914. After her death, her remaining works and belongings were transferred from her villa to the Fries Museum. This included a large selection of jewelry given to her by various European sovereigns.

== Selected paintings ==
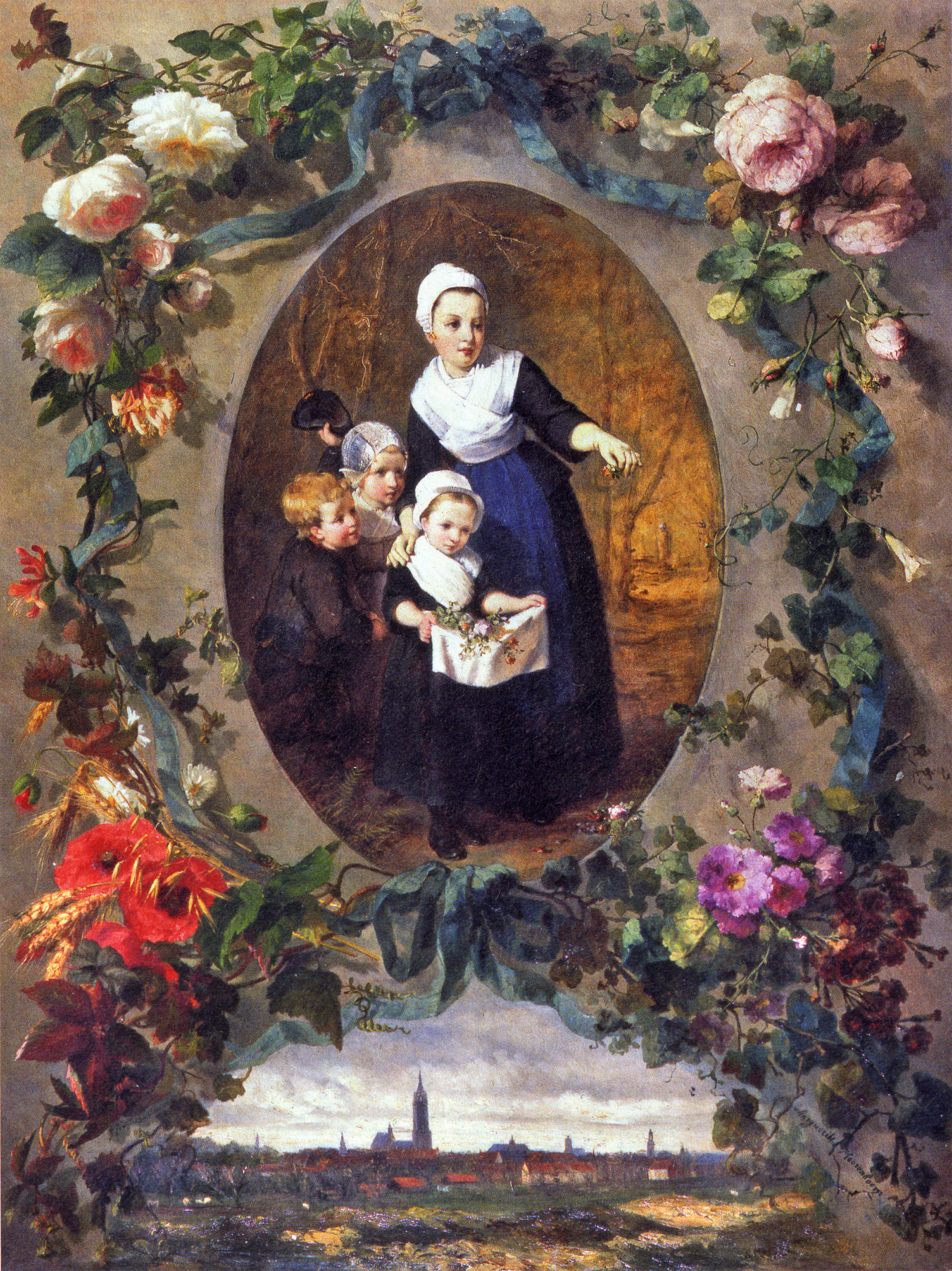
The Hague Orphans

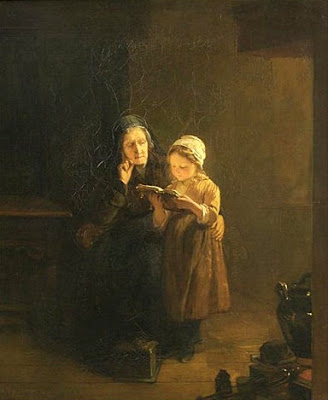
Old Woman and Child Reading

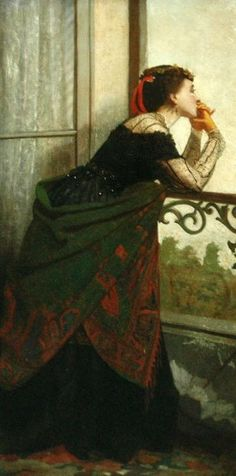
On the Balcony

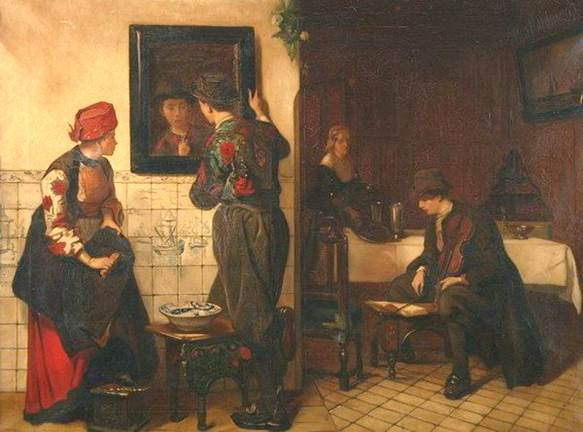
Dutch Interior with Four Figures

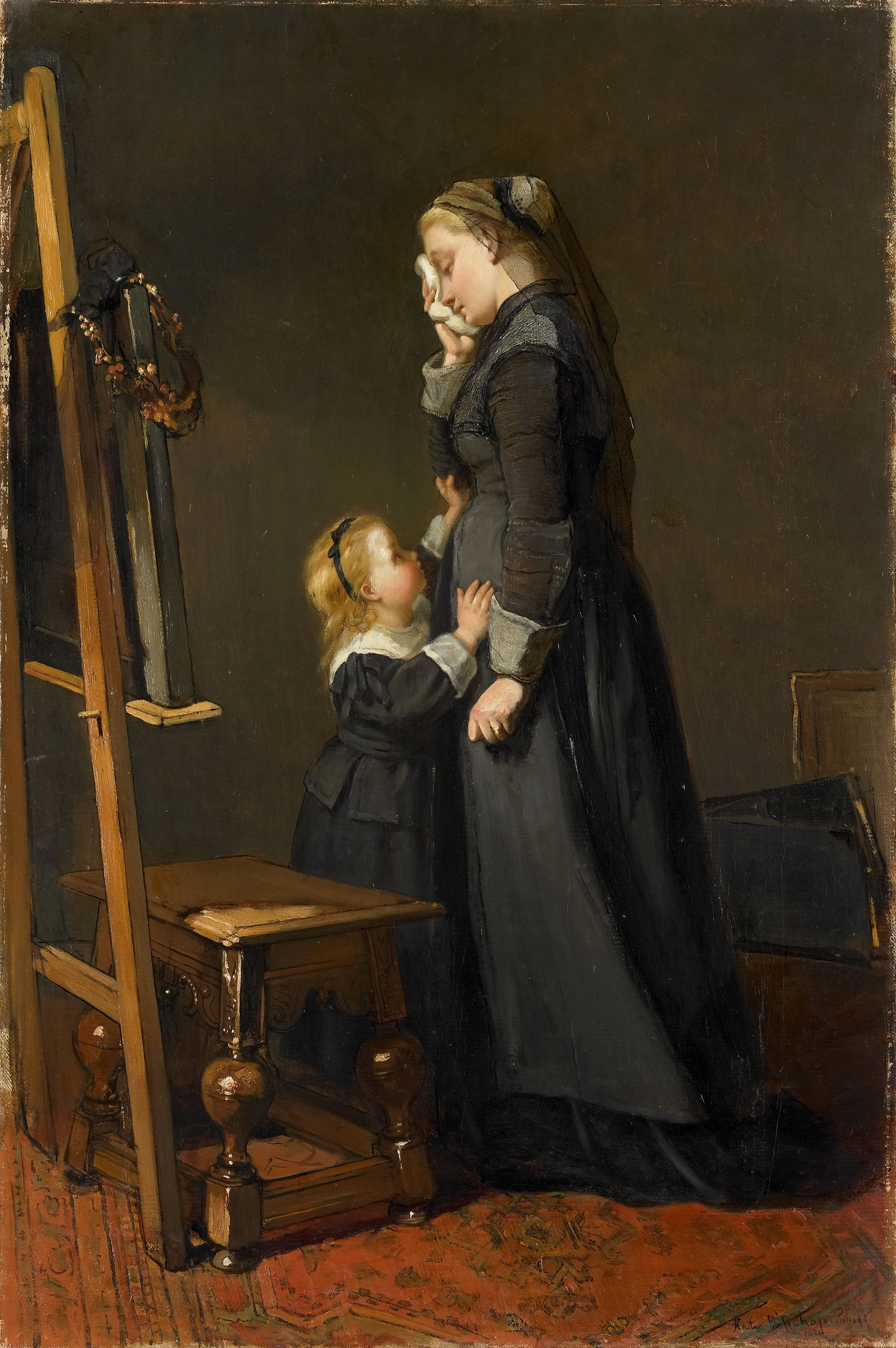
The Painter's Widow
