= Jacob Maris =

Dutch painter (1837–1899)

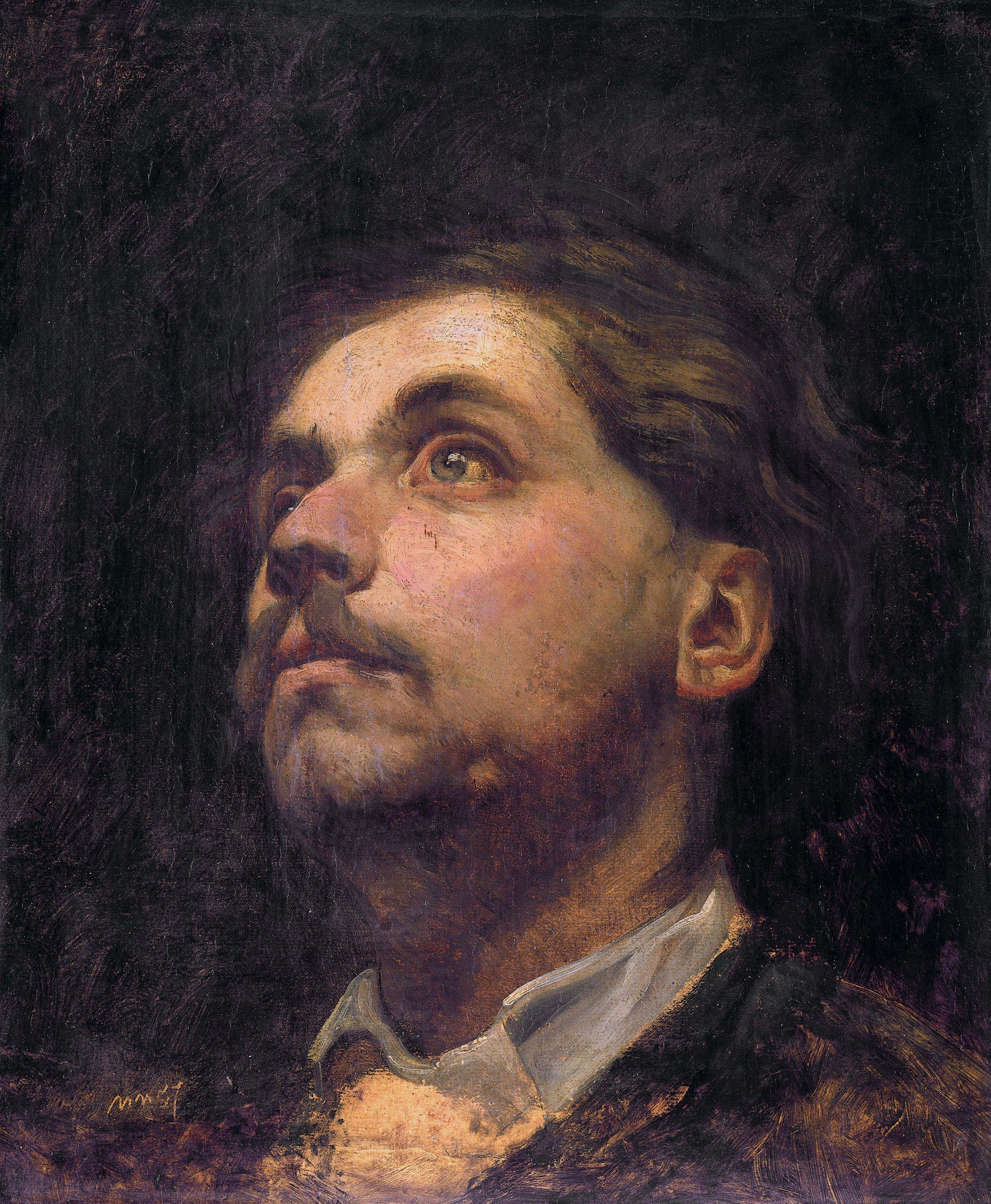
- Jacob Maris by Matthijs Maris, ca.1857
- Born: August 25, 1837; The Hague
- Died: August 7, 1899 (aged 61); Karlsbad
- Known for: Painting

Jacob Henricus Maris (August 25, 1837 – August 7, 1899) was a Dutch painter, who with his brothers Willem and Matthijs belonged to what has come to be known as the Hague School of painters. He was considered to be the most important and influential Dutch landscape painter of the last quarter of the nineteenth century. His first teacher was painter J.A.B. Stroebel who taught him the art of painting from 1849 to 1852. Jacob Maris's most known works are the series of portraits of the royal House of Orange, he worked on these with his brother Matthijs Maris. He is also known for landscapes such as Ship on the Scheveningen beach.

== Life ==
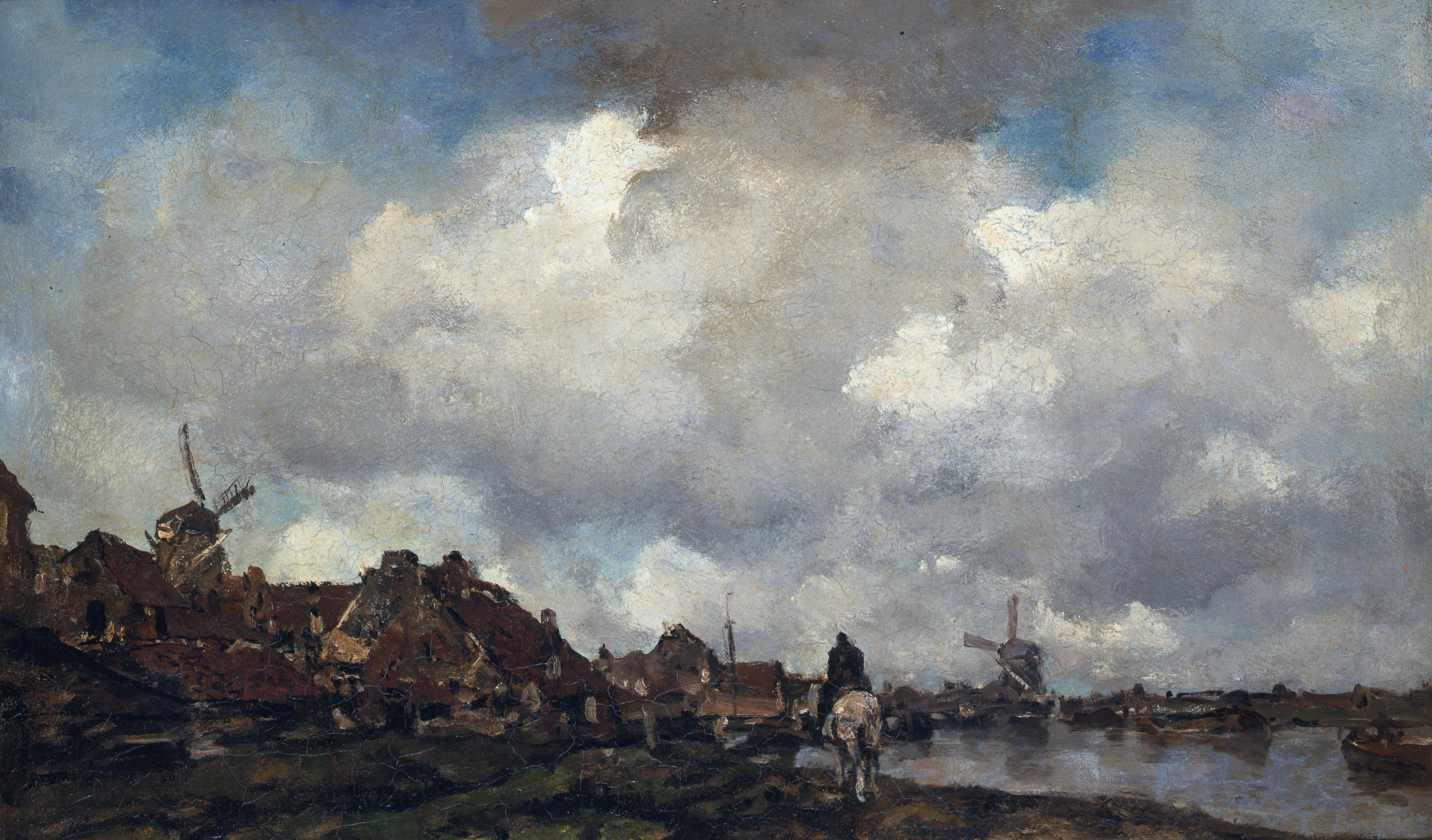
Village near Schiedam, oil on canvas. Dordrechts Museum

He was born in The Hague. When he was twelve he took some art lessons and later enrolled in the Hague Academy of Art. from 1850 to 1853 he attended this highly ranked art University. An art dealer recognized his talent and saw to it that Jacob was able to work in the studio of Hubertus van Hove. There he painted interiors as well as figurative and genre works. Van Hove took Maris under his wings and was not only his boss but also his new teacher.

Van Hove moved to Antwerp and the nineteen-year-old Maris went with him. This relationship continued until his brother Matthijs received a royal subsidy and joined Jacob. Together they rented space which also had room for their friend Lawrence Alma-Tadema. They took lessons at the Antwerp Academy and were able to sell some of their works. After this he traveled through Germany, Switzerland and France in 1861.

Like many of the Hague School alumni, Jacob Maris had enormous success in the Netherlands and abroad. He sold the biggest part of his paintings to private collectors in the United States and in Scotland.

In 1857, Jacob Maris returned to the Hague, but Matthijs stayed another year in Antwerp before he again shared a studio with Jacob in The Hague. After they had earned enough money by copying eight royal portraits, they were able to go to Oosterbeek where they met Johannes Warnardus Bilders, his son Gerard, and others who later play important parts in the Hague School. The brothers also went on a study trip together to Germany, Switzerland and France. When their money was spent, they again moved in with their parents and Jacob took more lessons at the Hague Academy of Art. In the summer of 1864, Jacob again went to Oosterbeek and possibly to Fontainebleau and Barbizon. Following this trip he lived in Paris from 1865 until 1871, and then returned to the Netherlands when the Franco-Prussian War broke out.

In The Hague, he became a strong landscape painter painting rivers and landscapes with mills and towpaths, and beach views with fishing boats. His stroke became broader and larger and his use of color became more subdued and directed towards portraying the atmospheric depiction of clouds. This part of has been compared to the seventeenth-century painters Jan van Goyen, Jacob Van Ruisdael and Johannes Vermeer. His way of working has been described in the following way:

They say that he paints first and draws only afterwards. He applies the paint thickly, builds it up, fiddles around and messes with it-all gradually developing a harmony of colors that establishes the major directions. Only then does he complete his figures with lively, thin brush strokes. But the final touch is done with a master stroke, and in the end the entire work is as solid as the tightest drawing.

Also, M. Philippe Zilcken said,

No painter has so well expressed the ethereal effects, bathed in air and light through floating silvery mist, in which painters delight, and the characteristic remote horizons blurred by haze; or again, the grey yet luminous weather of Holland, unlike the dead grey rain of England or the heavy sky of Paris.

In 1871, Maris became a member of the Pulchri Studio and would fill various administrative positions there. It was only after 1876 that he experienced any renown in the Netherlands and from 1885 on he was a celebrated painter. As a leader of the Hague School his influence was enormous. Nevertheless, Willem de Zwart and possibly Bernard Blommers had been his only students.

When he was in his sixties, Maris began to suffer from asthma and corpulence. At the advice of his doctors he went to take the waters at Karlsbad, where he suddenly died on 7 August 1899. He was buried in The Hague.

== Gallery ==
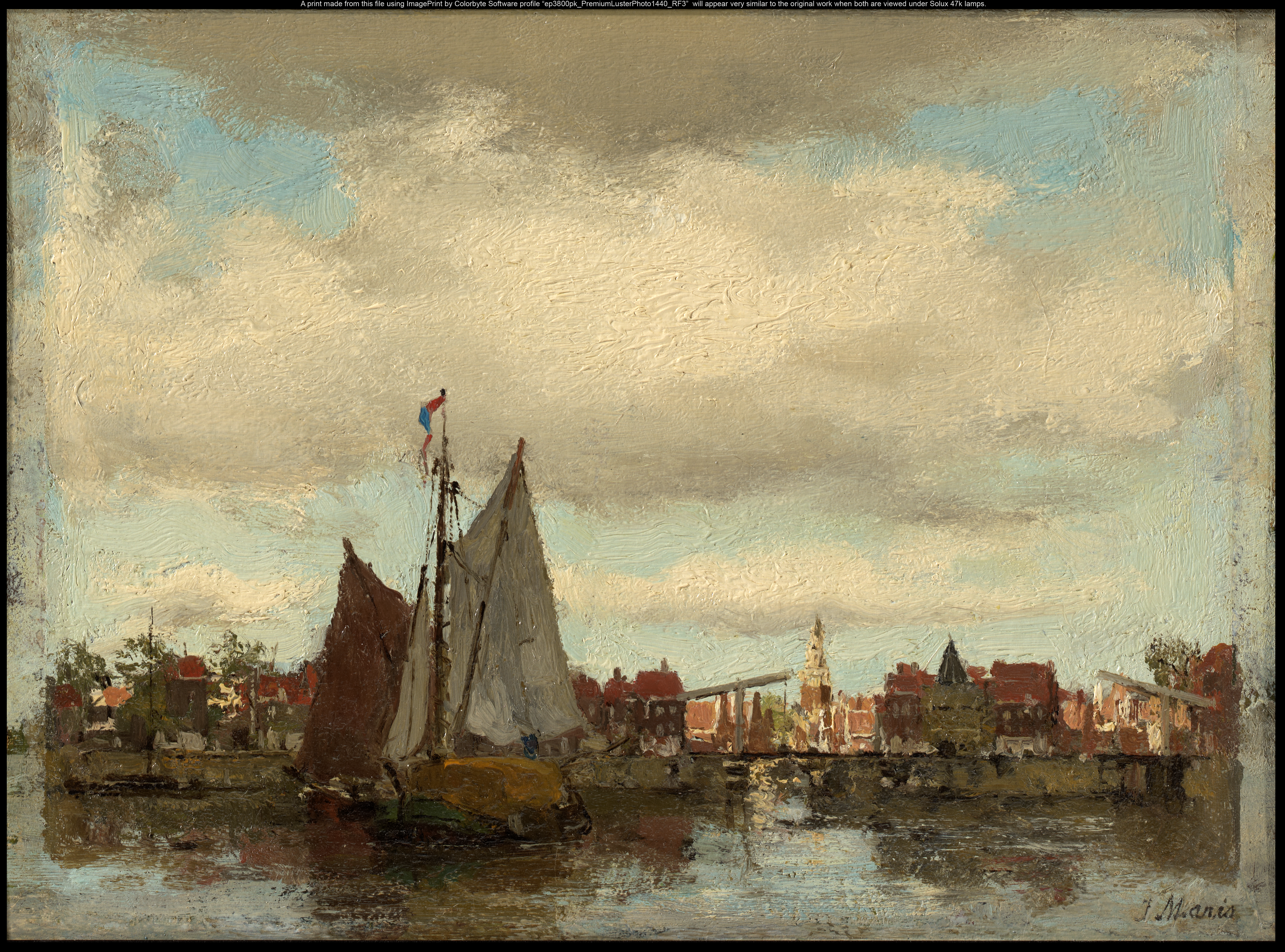
Harbor Scene, 1871. Clark Art Institute

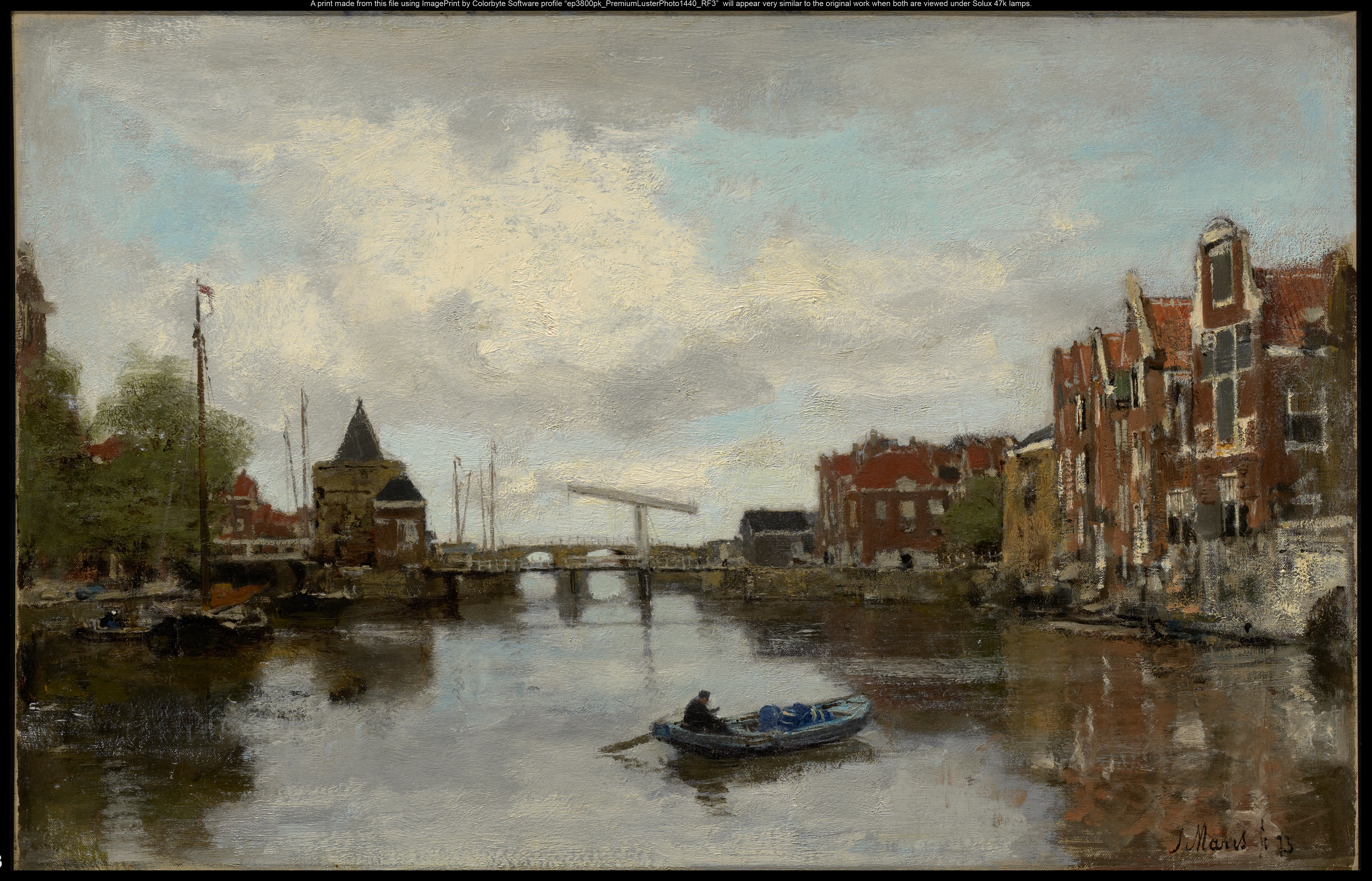
View of a Dutch City with the Schreierstoren in Amsterdam, 1873. Clark Art Institute

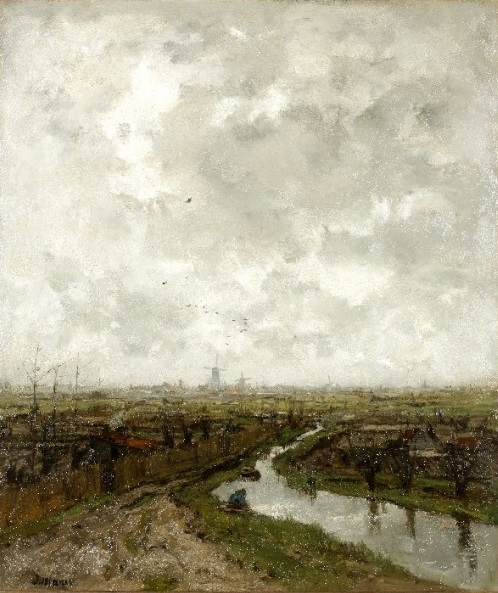
Allotments near The Hague, 1878. Kunstmuseum Den Haag

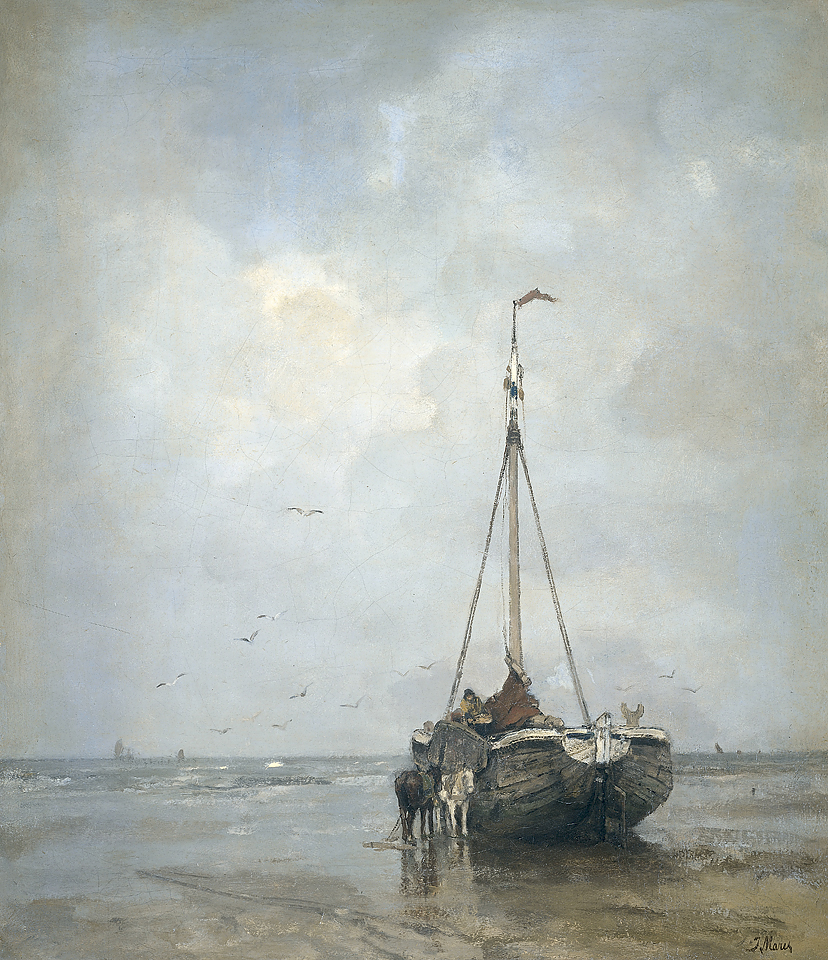
Ship on the Scheveningen Beach, c. 1885. Rijksmuseum

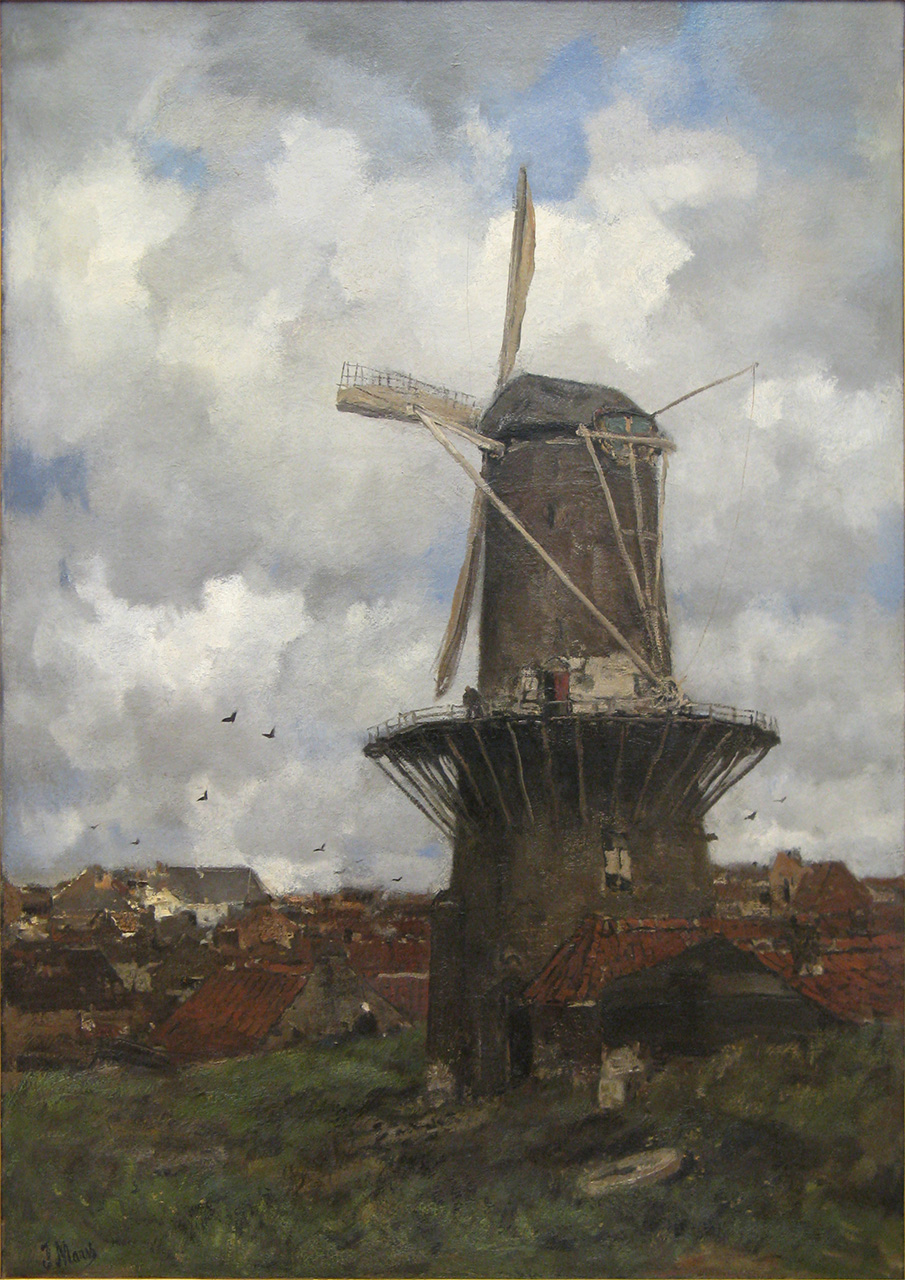
The Windmill, c. 1890. Kunstmuseum Den Haag

== Sources ==
- Sillevis, John and Tabak, Anne, The Hague School Book, Waanders Uitgegevers, Zwolle, 2004 (pp 267–276)
- Sheila D. Muller, Dutch Art An Encyclopedia, Garland publishing Inc, New York and London, 1997 (pp 235–236)
