= Bernard Blommers =

Dutch painter

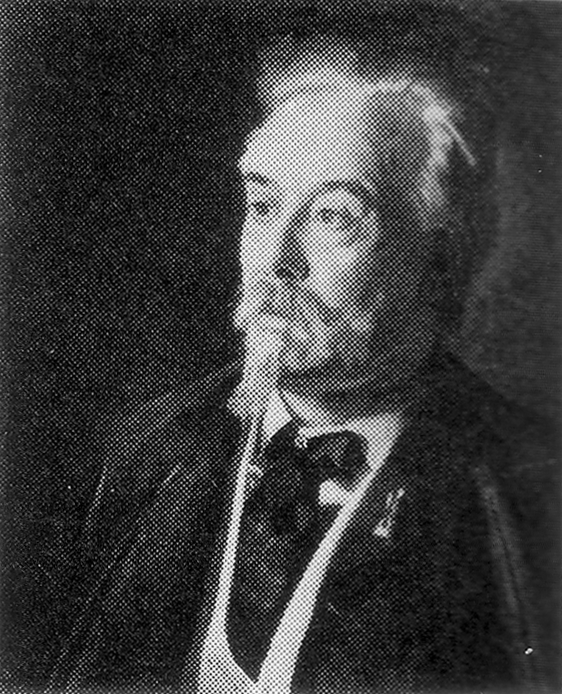
Portrait of B. J. Blommers (1904). Thomas Eakins

Bernardus Johannes (Bernard) Blommers (30 January 1845 in The Hague – 12 December 1914 in The Hague) was a Dutch etcher and painter of the Hague School.

He learned lithography early in his career, and then studied at the Hague Akademie under Johan Philip Koelman until 1868. His early paintings were mostly genre works depicting fishermen and their wives, heavily influenced by Jozef Israëls. The later works (from about 1890) are more loosely painted, although maritime and genre scenes remained the primary subject matter. His work was critically successful during his lifetime, being sought after by English, Scottish and American collectors. Blommers was also active as a teacher; among his pupils was the American painter Caroline van Hook Bean, who became his daughter-in-law in 1913.

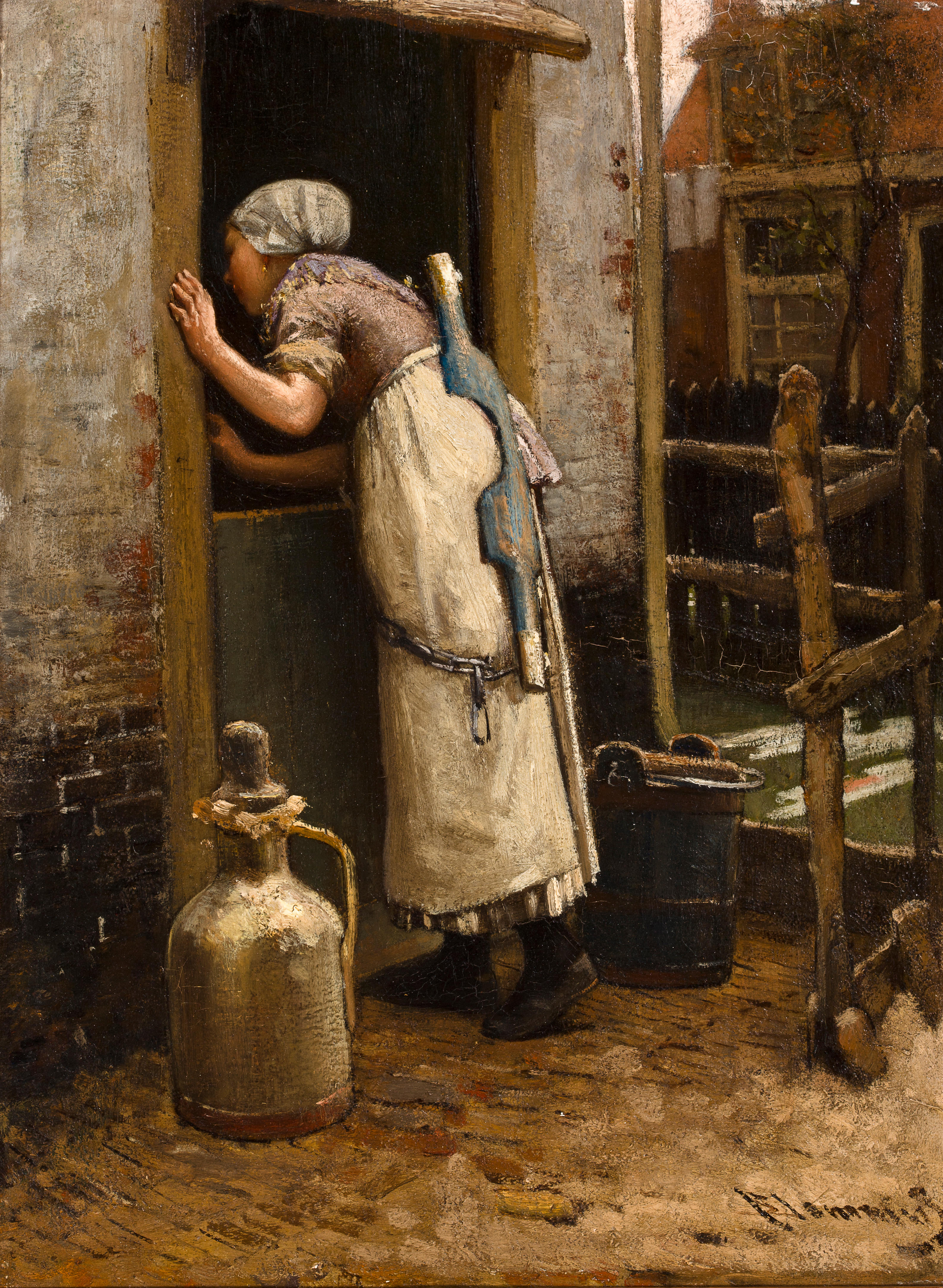
The milk maid, by 1914

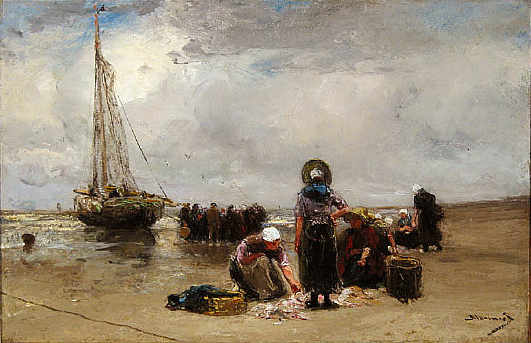
Seaside, unknown date
