= List of people from The Hague =

This is a list of people from The Hague.

== Politicians ==
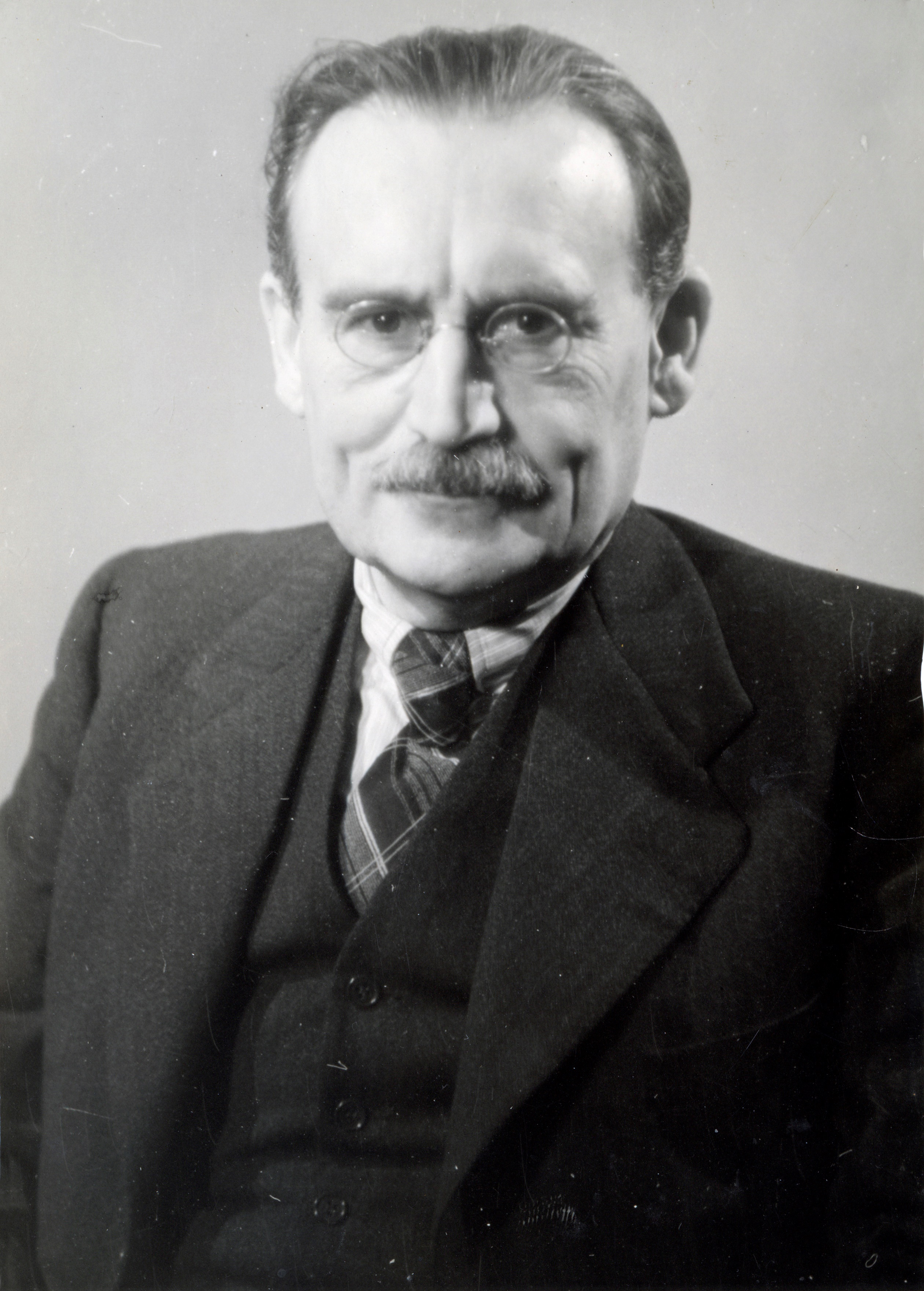
Willem Drees, Prime Minister

See also: List of mayors of The Hague

- Jozias van Aartsen (born 1947), former foreign minister; former Mayor of The Hague
- Ivo Daalder (born 1960), the US permanent representative to NATO, 2009 to 2013.
- Wim Deetman (born 1945), Speaker of the Dutch parliament from 1989 to 1996 and former Mayor of The Hague
- Willem Drees (1886–1988), former Prime Minister of the Netherlands
- Machiel de Graaf (born 1969), politician
- Andries Cornelis Dirk de Graeff (1872–1958), Governor General of Dutch East Indies, Dutch minister for foreign affairs, diplomat
- Dirk de Graeff van Polsbroek (1833–1916), Diplomat, Generalconsul and Dutch minister in Japan
- Dirk Georg de Graeff (1905–1986), chamberlain of the Dutch queens and managing director from the Algemene Bank Nederland
- Jan Pronk (born 1940), United Nations' special representative for Sudan
- Mark Rutte (born 1967), Dutch politician and former Prime Minister of the Netherlands from 2010 to 2024

== Monarchs ==
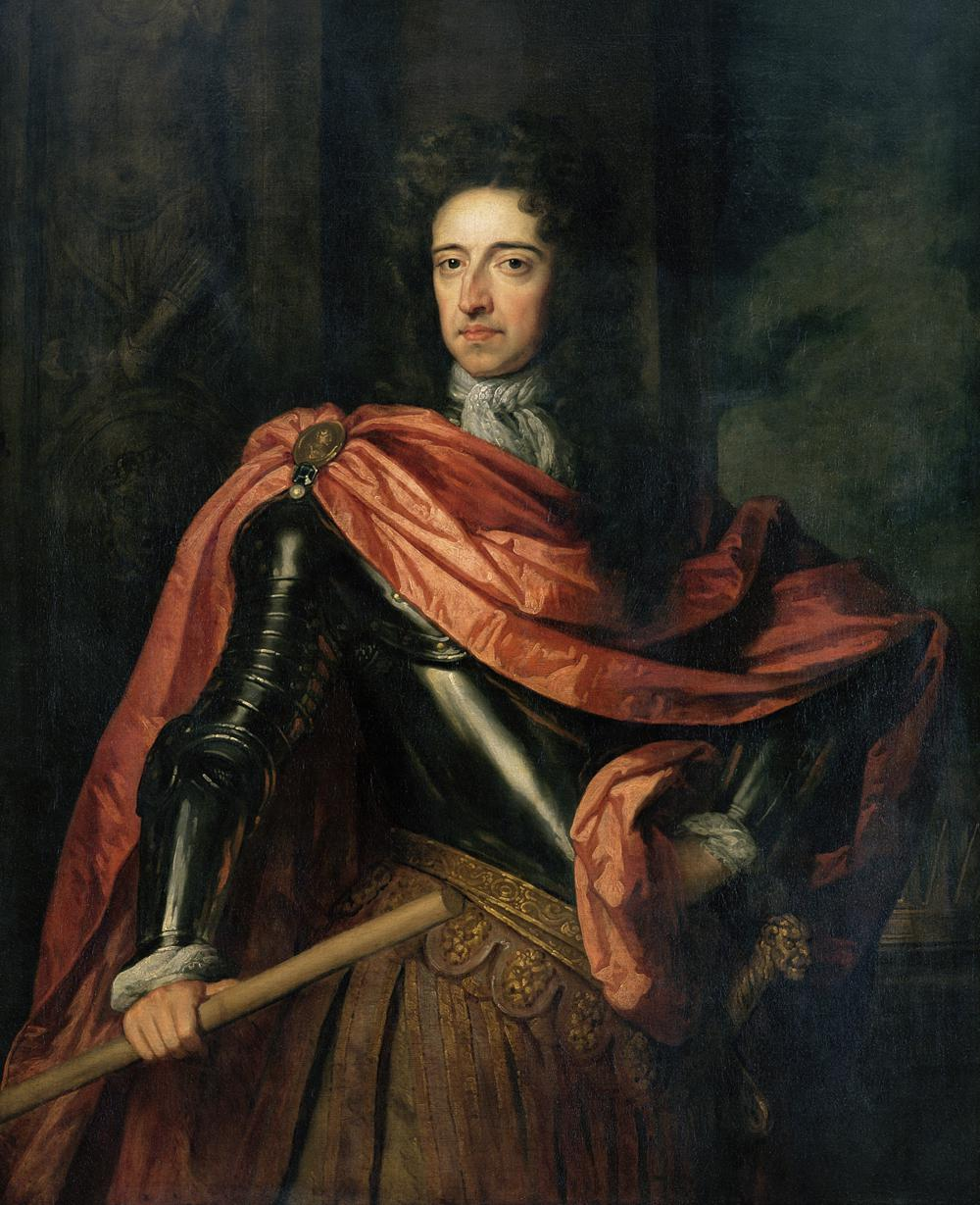
William III, King of England

- Annemarie, Duchess of Parma (born 1977)
- Queen Beatrix, (born 1938)
- Queen Juliana, (1909–2004)
- Queen Wilhelmina, (1880–1962).
- King William I, (1772–1843).
- King William II, (1792–1849).
- King William III, (1817–1890).
- William II, Prince of Orange, (Stadtholder) (1626–1650).
- William III, (Stadtholder, King William III of England), (1650–1702).
- William IV, Prince of Orange (1711–1751).
- William V, (Stadtholder), (1748–1806).
- Sophia of Hanover, (1630–1714).

== Arts ==
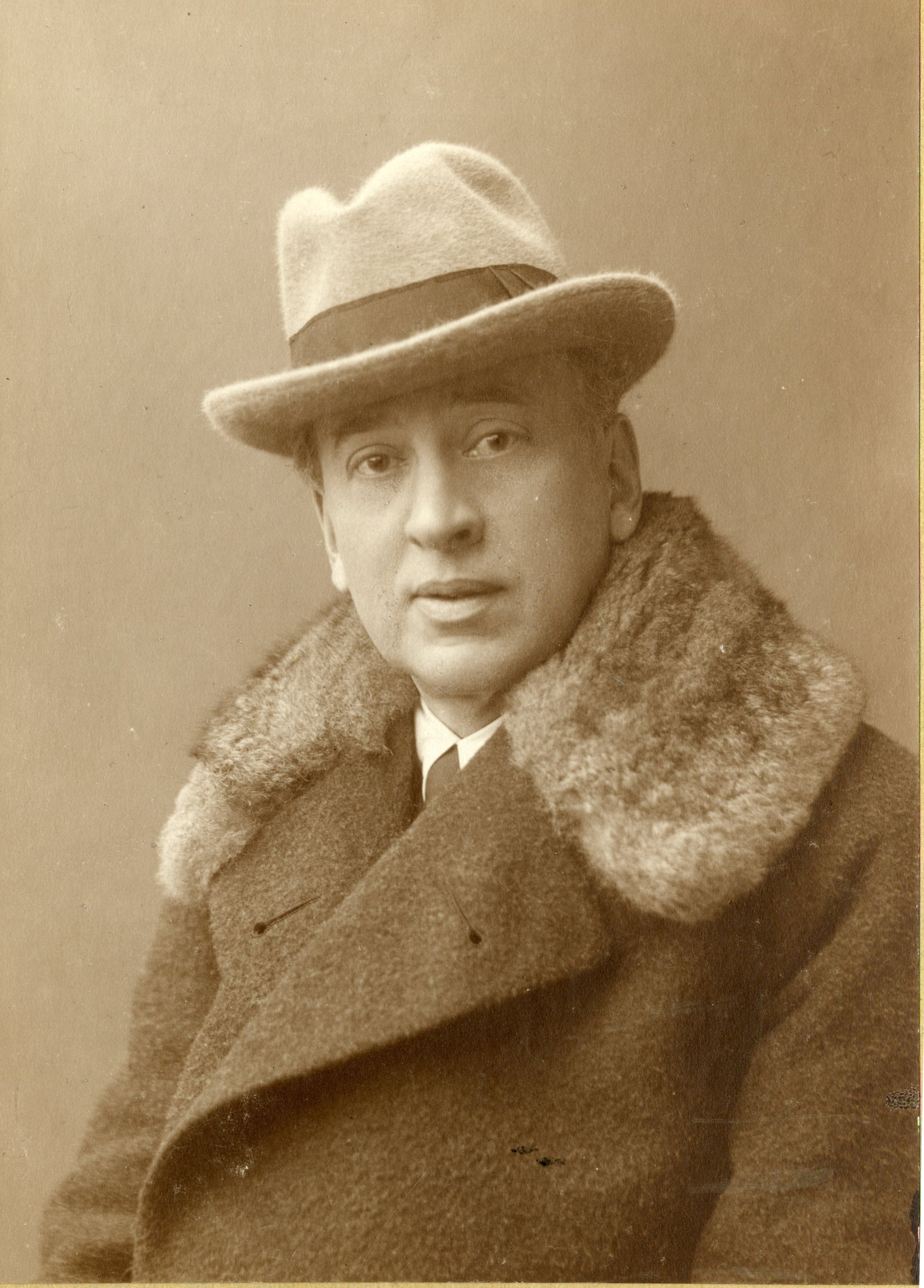
Louis Couperus, 1900

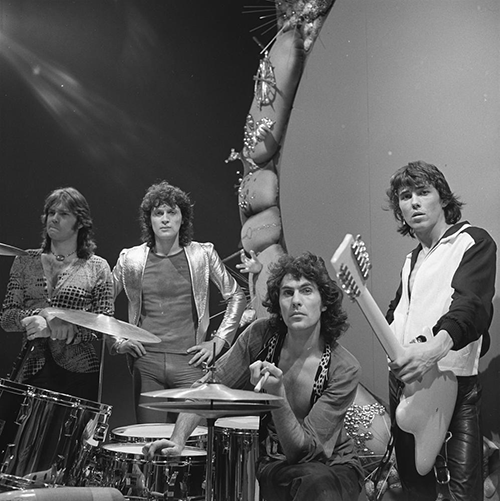
Golden Earring, band

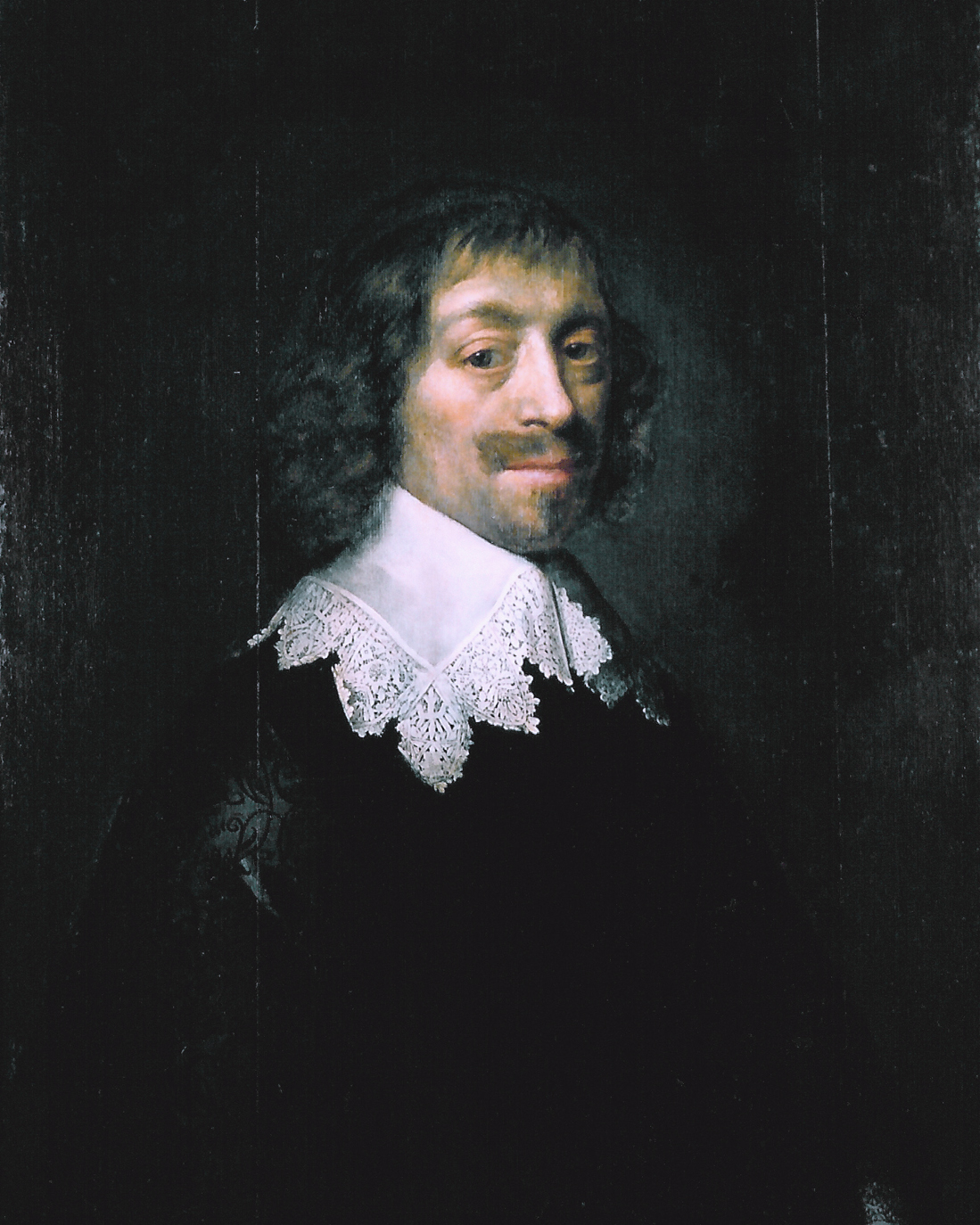
Constantijn Huygens, 1641

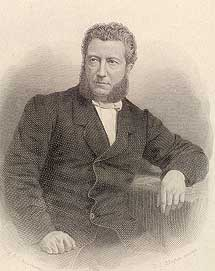
Jan Jacob Lodewijk ten Kate, ca.1865

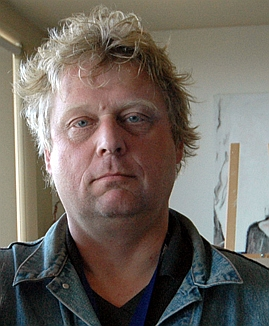
Theo Van Gogh, 2004

- Jurriaan Andriessen (1925–1996), composer
- Pia Beck (1925–2009), jazz pianist and singer
- Hendrik Petrus Berlage (1856–1934), architect
- Theo Bitter (1916–1994), graphic artist, painter and draftsman
- Ferdinand Bordewijk (1884–1965), author
- Lodewijk Bruckman (1903–1995), magic realist painter
- Dirk Bus (1907–1978), sculptor
- Remco Campert (born 1929), author, poet and columnist
- Simon Carmiggelt (1913–1987), writer, journalist and poet
- Thomas Cletcher (1598–1666), jeweller, goldsmith and gem dealer; mayor of The Hague, 1652 to 1657.
- Louis Couperus (1863–1923), novelist and poet.
- Demiak (born 1967), pseudonym of Maarten Demmink, painter, photographer and sculptor
- Jacob Derwig (born 1969), actor
- Diddo (born 1977), the artist name of Diddo Velema, conceptual artist and designer
- Jacob Gestman Geradts (born 1951), engineer, historian and pin-up artist
- Cornelis de Hooghe (1541-1583), illegitimate son of Emperor Charles V, engraver
- Constantijn Huygens (1596–1687), Dutch Golden Age poet and composer.
- Jan Jakob Lodewijk ten Kate (1819–1889), a divine, prose writer and poet.
- Imran Khan (born 1984), Dutch-Punjabi singer and songwriter
- Sander Kleinenberg (born 1971), dance music DJ and record producer
- Martin Koolhoven (born 1969), film director and screenwriter
- André Landzaat (1944–2025), actor
- Legowelt (born ca.1970), real name Danny Wolfers, electronic musician
- Jacques van Lier (1875–1951), cellist and teacher
- Johan Mutters (1858–1930), architect
- Cees Nooteboom (1933–2026), poet and writer
- Wilhelmina Sablairolles (1818–1891), actress
- Johan D. Scherft (1891-1969), etcher and gallerist
- Jowie Schulner (born 1985), Dutch electronic composer, artist, producer and remixer
- Johannes Secundus (1511–1536), a Neo-Latin poet.
- Marinus Snoeren (1919–1982), classical musician (cello)
- Carel Struycken (born 1948), actor, Addams Family and Star Trek
- Marjo Tal (1915-2006), composer and pianist
- Anouk Teeuwe (born 1975), known as Anouk, singer and songwriter
- Ernest Thoen (1946–2011), black and white portrait photographer
- Aldous Byron Valensia Clarkson (born 1971), known as Valensia, composer, producer and multi-instrumentalist.
- Wieteke van Dort (born 1943), actress, comedian, singer and writer.
- Marcel van Eeden (born 1965), draftsman and painter.
- Theo van Gogh (1957–2004), director, film and TV producer, actor and author.
- Nancy van Overveldt (1930-2015), artist
- Wilhelmina van Sluyters (1852–1926), actress
- Martina Adriana Maria van Toulon (1792-1880), artist
- Adrian Vandenberg (born 1954), rock guitarist
- Max Velthuijs (1923–2005), painter, children's illustrator and writer.
- Georgina Verbaan (born 1979), actress and singer.
- Mariska Veres (1947-2006), singer
- Paul Verhoeven (born 1938), film director and screenwriter
- Carel Vosmaer (1826–1888), poet and art critic.
- Flore Zoé (born 1975), a fine art and fashion photographer
- Maria van Zuylekom (1759–1831), poet and writer

=== Arts collaborations ===
Below are entries that are not stricktly people but collaborations (i.e. bands, duos etc.)

- Dash Berlin (formed 2007), electronic music project
- Blasterjaxx (formed 2010), DJ and record producer duo
- Glowinthedark (formed 2009), DJ and record production duo
- Golden Earring (1961-2021), Nederbeat rock band
- Gruppo Sportivo (formed 1976) pop band
- Kane (1998–2014), pop rock band
- Mark Norman (formed 2001), DJ duo
- Shocking Blue (1967-1974), Nederbeat music group, known for the song "Venus"
- Van Kooten en De Bie (formed 1963), comedy duo

== Science & Business ==
Christiaan Huygens, 1671

- Jacob Golius (1596–1667) an Orientalist and mathematician.
- Samuel Goudsmit (1902 –1978) - Dutch-American physicist
- Roland Greefkes (1941-2021) blacksmith
- Christiaan Huygens (1629–1695) astronomer, physicist, mathematician; member of the Royal Society; inventor of the pendulum clock and the pocket watch.
- Zacharias Janssen (1585 – pre-1632) a spectacle-maker; often credited with the first known creation of a compound microscope, otherwise previously credited with the optical telescope.
- Walter Lewin (born 1936) Astrophysicist and former professor of physics at the Massachusetts Institute of Technology.
- Simon van der Meer (1925–2011) Nobel Prize in Physics, 1984
- Guido van Rossum (born 1956) designer of Python (programming language)
- Bernadine Strik (1962–2023), horticulturist.
- Jan Tinbergen (1903–1994) economist, won the Nobel Prize for economics, 1969
- Niko Tinbergen (1907–1988) Nobel Prize in Physiology or Medicine, 1973
- Leonard van Veldhoven (born 1947) architect, hotelier and writer

== Sport ==
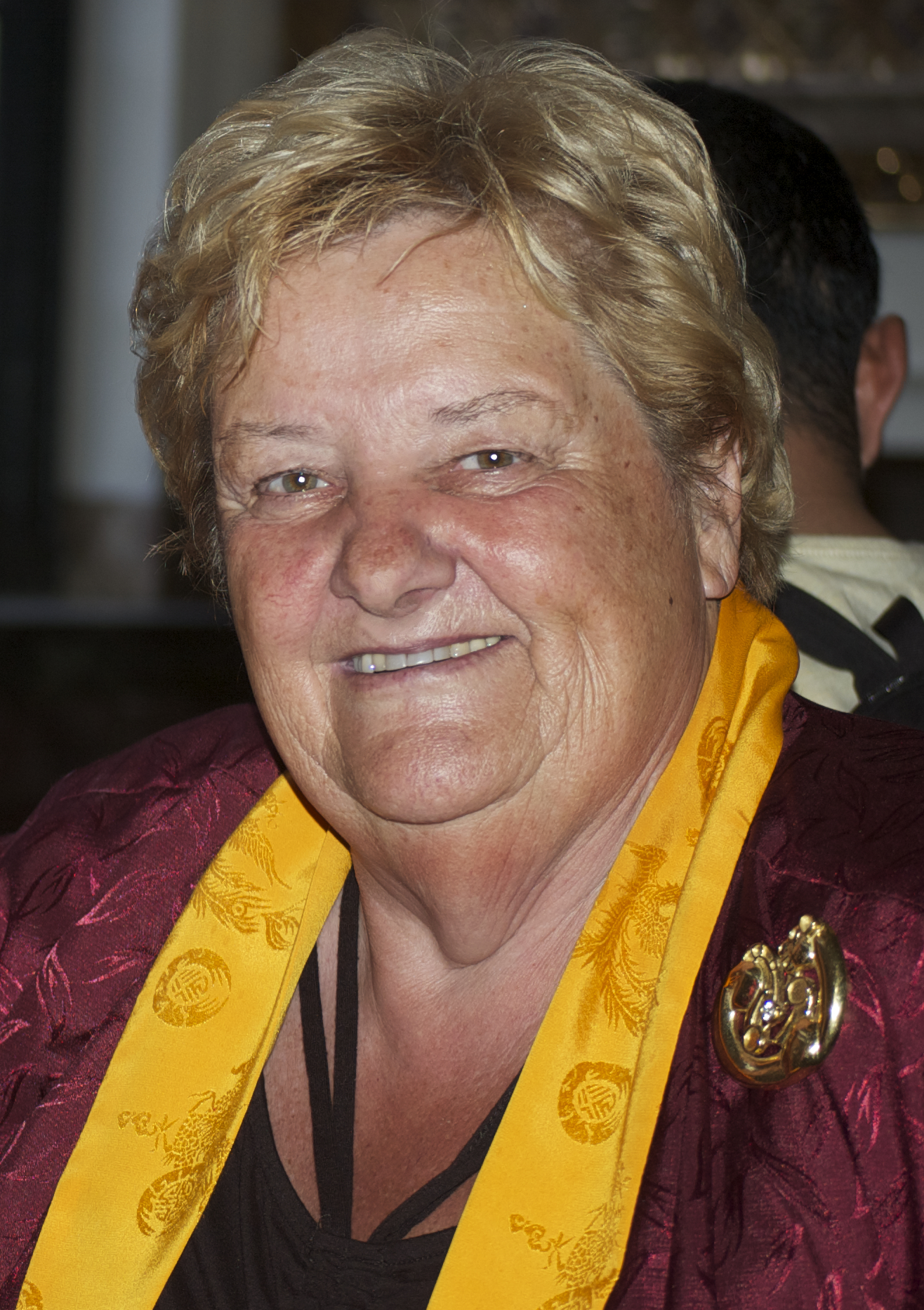
Erica Terpstra, 2012

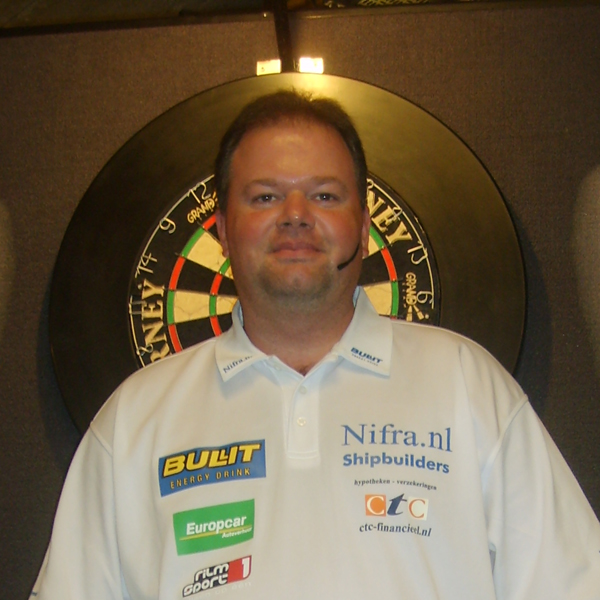
Raymond van Barneveld, darts player

- Dick Advocaat (born 1947), football player, former coach of Netherlands national football team
- Peter Blangé (born 1964) volleyball player, gold medallist at the 1996 Summer Olympics
- Michael Boogerd (born 1972), cyclist, winner of two stages of the Tour de France
- Niels Feijen (born 1977), pool player, won the 2014 WPA World Nine-ball Championship
- Dan Gadzuric (born 1978), former National Basketball Association player
- Robin Haase (born 1987), professional tennis player
- Thom Harinck (born 1943), kickboxing trainer
- David Huddleston (born 2000), a Bulgarian gymnast.
- Martin Jol (born 1956), former football player; former coach of AFC Ajax.
- Ties Kruize (born 1952), former Olympic field hockey player
- Tim Krul (born 1988), football goalkeeper with Norwich City F.C.
- Alex Lely (born 1973), former professional pool player.
- Roland Scholten (born 1965), former professional darts player
- Erica Terpstra (born 1943), 1964 Olympic swimming champion, former sports minister and current President of the Dutch Olympic Committee
- Raymond van Barneveld (born 1967), professional darts player, 5-time world champion
- Daan van Bunge (born 1982), cricketer, twice represented Netherlands in Cricket World Cup
- Steven van de Velde (born 1994), beach volleyball player and convicted child rapist
- Bart Veldkamp (born 1967), 1992 Olympic Speed Skating Champion (10 km)
- Joop Zoetemelk (born 1946), former racing cyclist, won the 1980 Tour de France
- Sarina Wiegman (born 1969), football player, coach of the Lionesses

== Miscellaneous ==
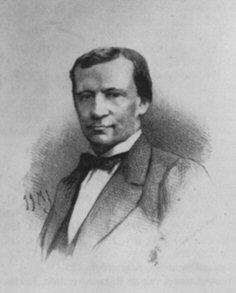
Conrad Busken Huet

- Lucia de Berk (born 1961) nurse, convicted in 2003 of three murders and three attempted murders, exonerated in 2010
- Noor van Crevel (1929–2019), social worker and political lesbian activist
- Demetrius Augustine Gallitzin (1770–1840) émigré Russian aristocrat and Catholic priest.
- Conrad Busken Huet (1826–1886) a pastor, journalist and literary critic.
- Hendrik Jut (1851–1878) murderer
- Albert Plesman (1889–1953) founder of the KLM Royal Dutch Airlines
- Charles van der Leeuw (born 1952) journalist
- Pieter Melvill van Carnbee (1816–1856) geographer.
- Jos C.N. Raadschelders (born 1955), professor at Ohio State University
- Baruch Spinoza (1632–1677) philosopher, moved to The Hague in 1670, where he finished his Ethics; died aged 44.
- Alexine Tinne (1835–1869) an explorer in Africa and photographer.
- Jacob de Jager (1923-2004) a religious leader and General Authority of the Church of Jesus Christ of Latter-day Saints.
