= Enzo Knol =

Dutch vlogger

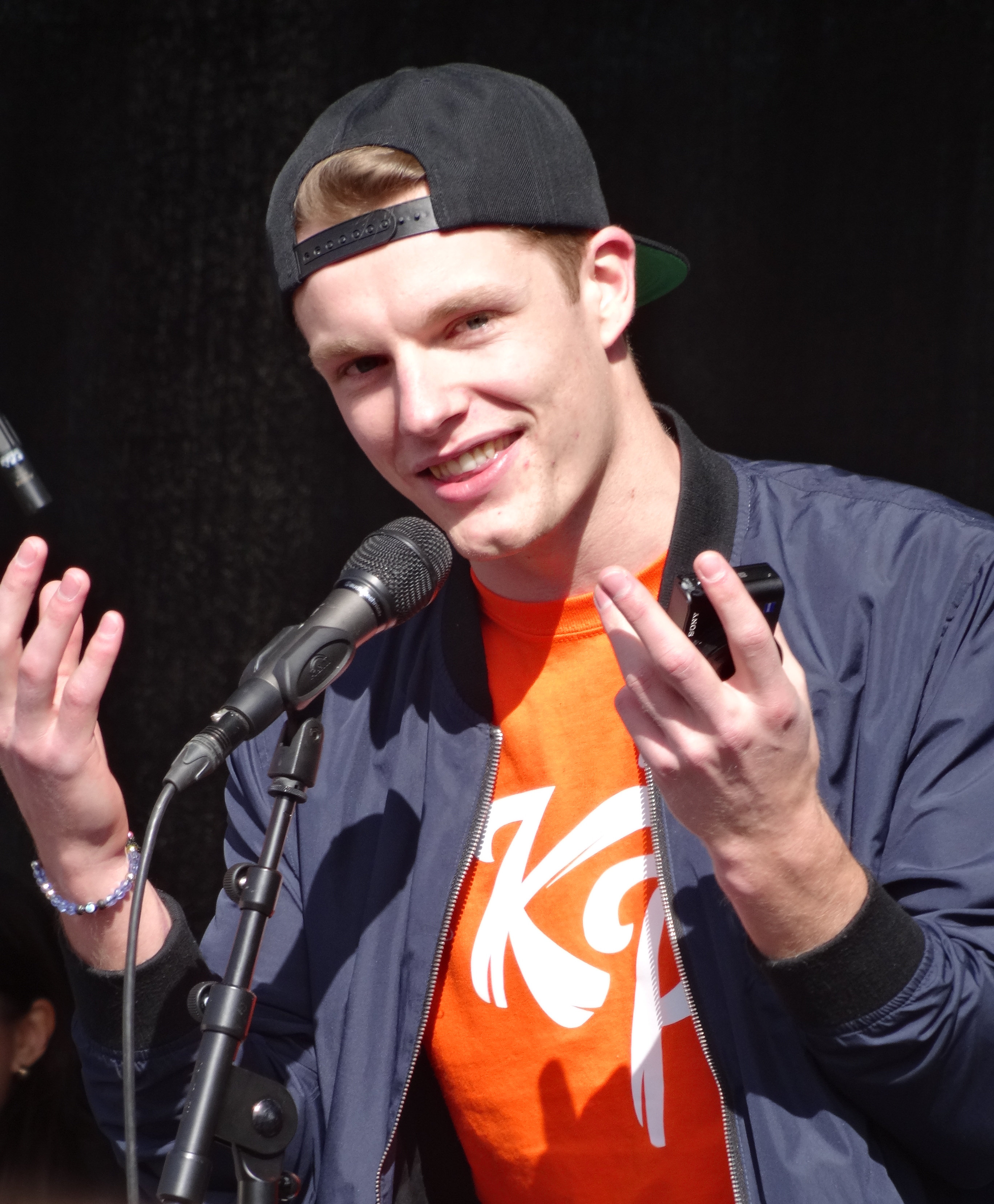
- Enzo Knol at the opening of Koningsdag 2015 in Assen.
- Born: Enzo Erkelens; 8 June 1993 (age 33); Rolde, Netherlands

YouTube information
- Channel: EnzoKnol
- Years active: 2013–present
- Genres: Vlog; Let's Play (gaming)
- Subscribers: 2.99 million
- Views: 3.76 billion
- Last updated: 5 July 2026

Enzo Knol (Dutch: [ˈɛnzoː ˈknɔl]; born 8 June 1993) is a Dutch video blogger on YouTube with over 2.97 million subscribers. He rose to fame from 2014 onwards, reaching the milestone of three million subscribers in 2026 and becoming one of the most well-known Dutch YouTubers.

== Early life ==
Knol was born Enzo Erkelens. After his parents' divorce, Enzo and his brother Milan adopted their mother's surname, Knol. Together with their mother and stepfather, they lived in The Hague for some time. As a teenager, Enzo Knol also spent time with his father in Assen. When Knol was 17 years old, he spent a hundred days in a closed mental institution due to serious problems with aggression and drug use. At the age of 18, he broke off contact with his father.

== Career ==
Knol was inspired to make videos by his older brother Milan Knol, another popular Dutch YouTuber, who had been active on the internet for some time. On June 9, 2013, Knol published his first YouTube video, which he had recorded the day before to celebrate his twentieth birthday. His real breakthrough came in February 2014, when a video of a failed bike stunt in which he broke his arm went viral. By the fall of 2014, Knol had over 400,000 subscribers.

For a long time, Knol posted a new video daily. On his main channel, EnzoKnol, a new vlog appeared every afternoon in which he often covered humorous topics, but sometimes also more serious ones, such as bullying or the impact of a divorce. Some videos contained product placement. In April 2018, Knol split his content into two channels: EnzoKnol, dedicated to vlogs, and EnzoKnol2, where he publishes gaming videos. In 2021, he launched a third channel, EnzoKnol Shorts, featuring short clips from his videos.

In late 2015, the NOS named Enzo Knol's YouTube channel the Dutch-language YouTuber with the most subscribers. On December 29, 2015, his channel reached the milestone of one million subscribers. Over time, his increasing popularity also attracted attention from established media outlets, such as RTL Late Night, where he appeared occasionally starting in September 2014, and events for his fans, including a gathering at the Jaarbeurs in October 2014, where the police had to intervene due to the massive turnout. A month later, another fan meetup was held in Amsterdam where registration was required to meet Knol. Knol also received an offer to do his own reality series on television, but he turned it down.

On September 13, 2018, Knol's original YouTube channel gained two million subscribers. In 2019, Knol provided the voice for the character Chuck in the Dutch version of the animated film Angry Birds 2. In that same year, Knol was surpassed as the biggest Dutch-speaking YouTuber by the channel StukTV, a position which he regained the next year..

On October 31, 2020, Knol participated in StukTV's Het Jachtseizoen, during which he successfully managed to escape.

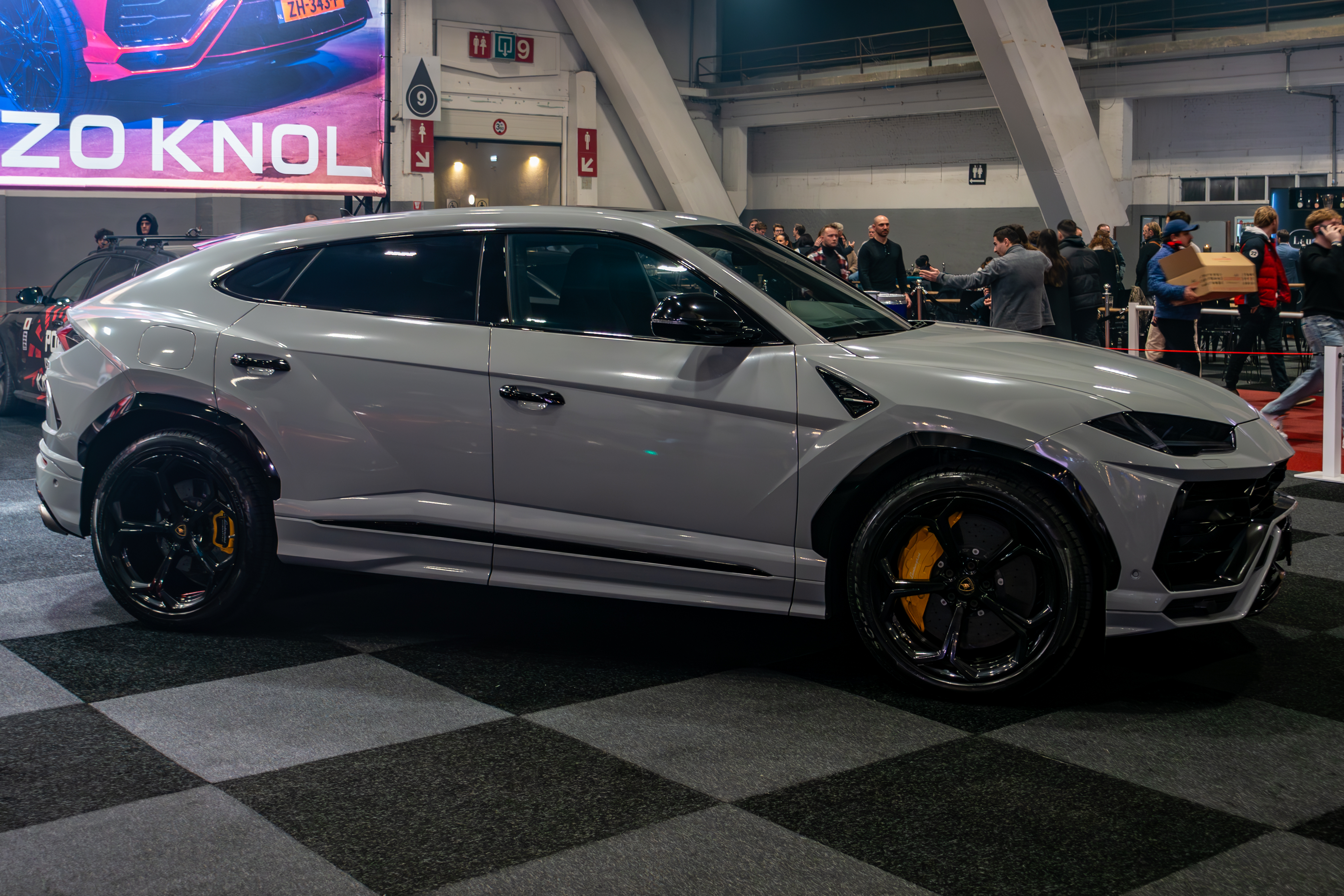
Knol's Lamborghini Urus at Brussels Auto Show 2024

== Merchandise ==
=== Knolpower ===
On October 23, 2015, Knol published his book Knolpower!, in which he wrote about, among other things, his vlogging career, held interviews with fans and family members, and gave a course on vlogging.

=== Pop-up stores ===
On December 19, 2018, Knol opened his own pop-up store in the Jumbo Foodmarkt in Groningen. On July 31, 2019, a second pop-up store was opened in Tilburg. On December 22, 2022, Knol returned with another Knolpower pop-up store, this time in Batavia Stad near Lelystad.

== Personal life ==
Knol used to make many of his vlogs together with his then-girlfriend Dee van der Zeeuw, whom he met through social media. She appeared in most of his vlogs from the period 2013-2018. On June 25, 2018, they decided to end their relationship permanently. Since November 2019, his Myron Koops has appeared daily in Knol's vlogs, officially announcing their relationship on November 18, 2020. Since May 1, 2025, Knol and Koops have been registered partners. On May 1, 2024, their son Riven Khen Knol was born.

=== Controversy ===
In 2023, Knol and his girlfriend Myron Koops were pulled over by the police after driving over 160 km/h in their Porsche Panamera. Knol filmed the incident and posted it on YouTube, which led to criticism from both his followers, the police and traffic organizations. Knol later publicly apologized for his behavior during the incident.

== Filmography ==
Year	Title	Role	Notes
2014	The Nut Job	Redline (voice)	Dutch
2016	The Angry Birds Movie	Chuck	Dutch
2017	Despicable Me 3	Clive	Dutch
2019	The Angry Birds Movie 2	Chuck	Dutch
