= Pieter Melvill van Carnbee =

Pieter Melvill van Carnbee may refer to:

- Pieter Melvill van Carnbee (1743-1810), Dutch vice-admiral
- Pieter Melvill van Carnbee (1816-1856), Dutch geographer, grandson of the above
