= Snoeren =

Snoeren is a surname. Notable people with the surname include:

- Alex Snoeren, American computer scientist
- Marinus Snoeren (1919–1982), Dutch cellist and music educator
- Mark Snoeren (born 1974), Dutch politician
- Rolf Snoeren (born 1969), Dutch fashion designer
