= Rolde =

- Village
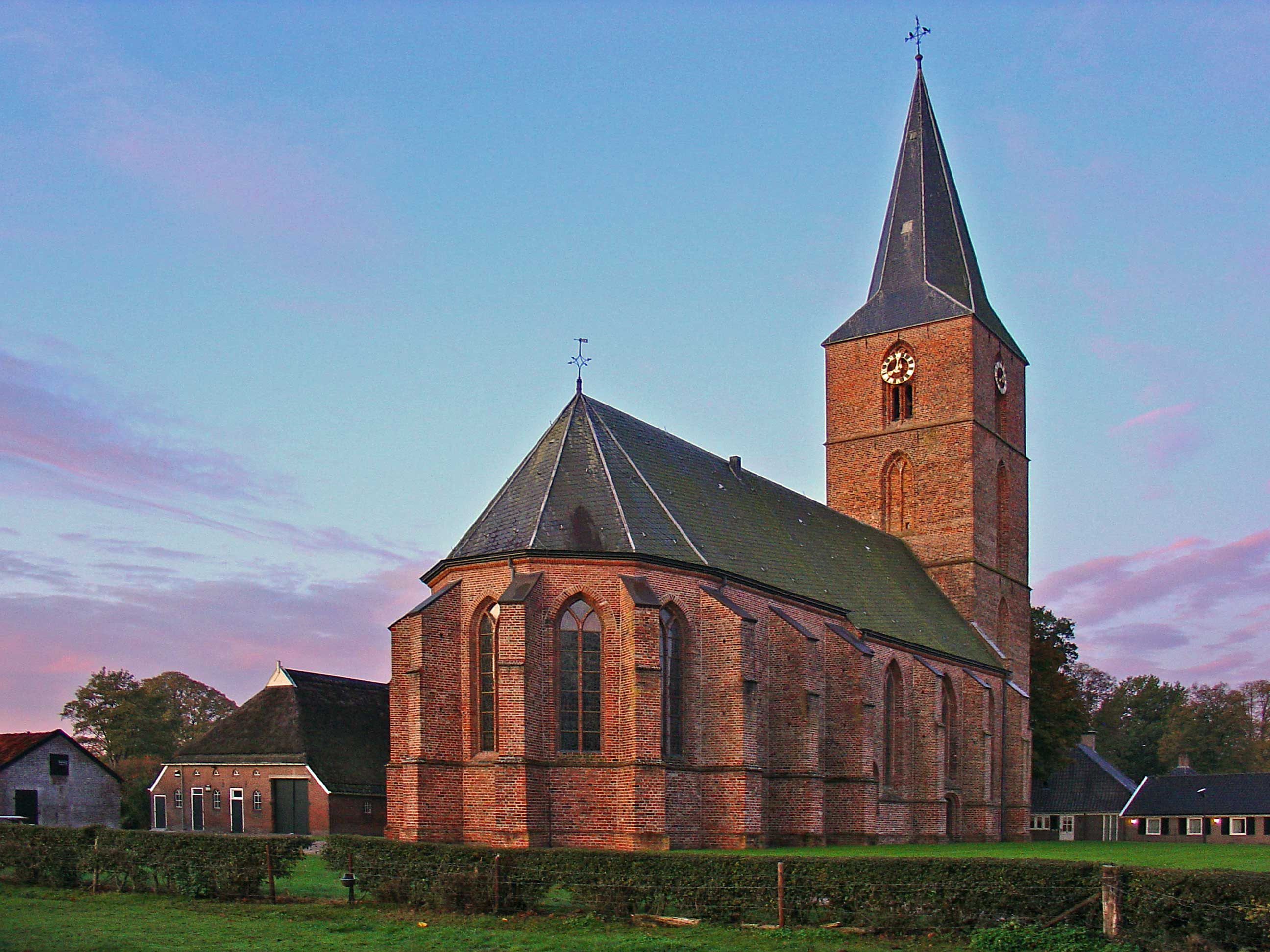
- Jacobuskerk in 2009

- Flag Coat of arms

- Location in the province of Drenthe in the Netherlands
- Coordinates: 52°59′13″N 6°38′46″E
- Country: Netherlands
- Province: Drenthe
- Municipality: Aa en Hunze

Area
  - Total: 24.67 km^{2} (9.53 sq mi)
- Elevation: 16 m (52 ft)

Population (2021)
  - Total: 3,905
  - Density: 158.3/km^{2} (410.0/sq mi)
- Time zone: UTC+1 (CET)
  - Summer (DST): UTC+2 (CEST)
- Postal code: 9448 & 9451
- Dialing code: 0592

Rolde (Dutch pronunciation: [ˈrɔldə]) is a village in the Dutch province of Drenthe. Located in the municipality of Aa en Hunze, it lies about 6 km (3.7 mi) east of Assen. In 2021, Rolde had a population of 3,905. Famous YouTuber Enzo Knol was born in Rolde.

== History ==
Rolde was a separate municipality until 1998, when it became a part of the newly established municipality of Aa en Hunze.

Although facilities are limited, Rolde possesses a ten-pin bowling alley. There are also two hunebeds on a site east of the church. The windmill has been restored to working order.

== Gallery ==
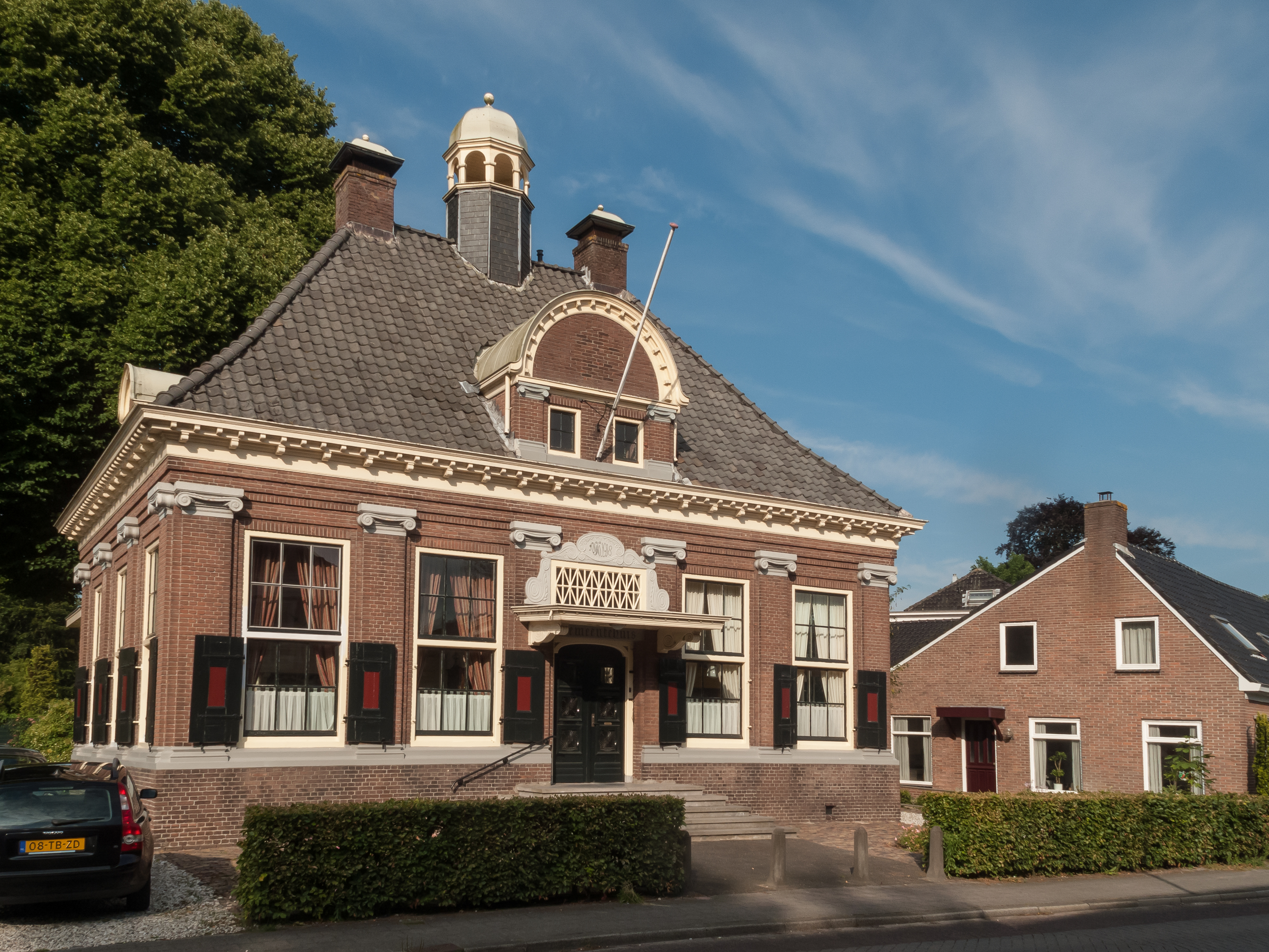
Former Rolde Town Hall

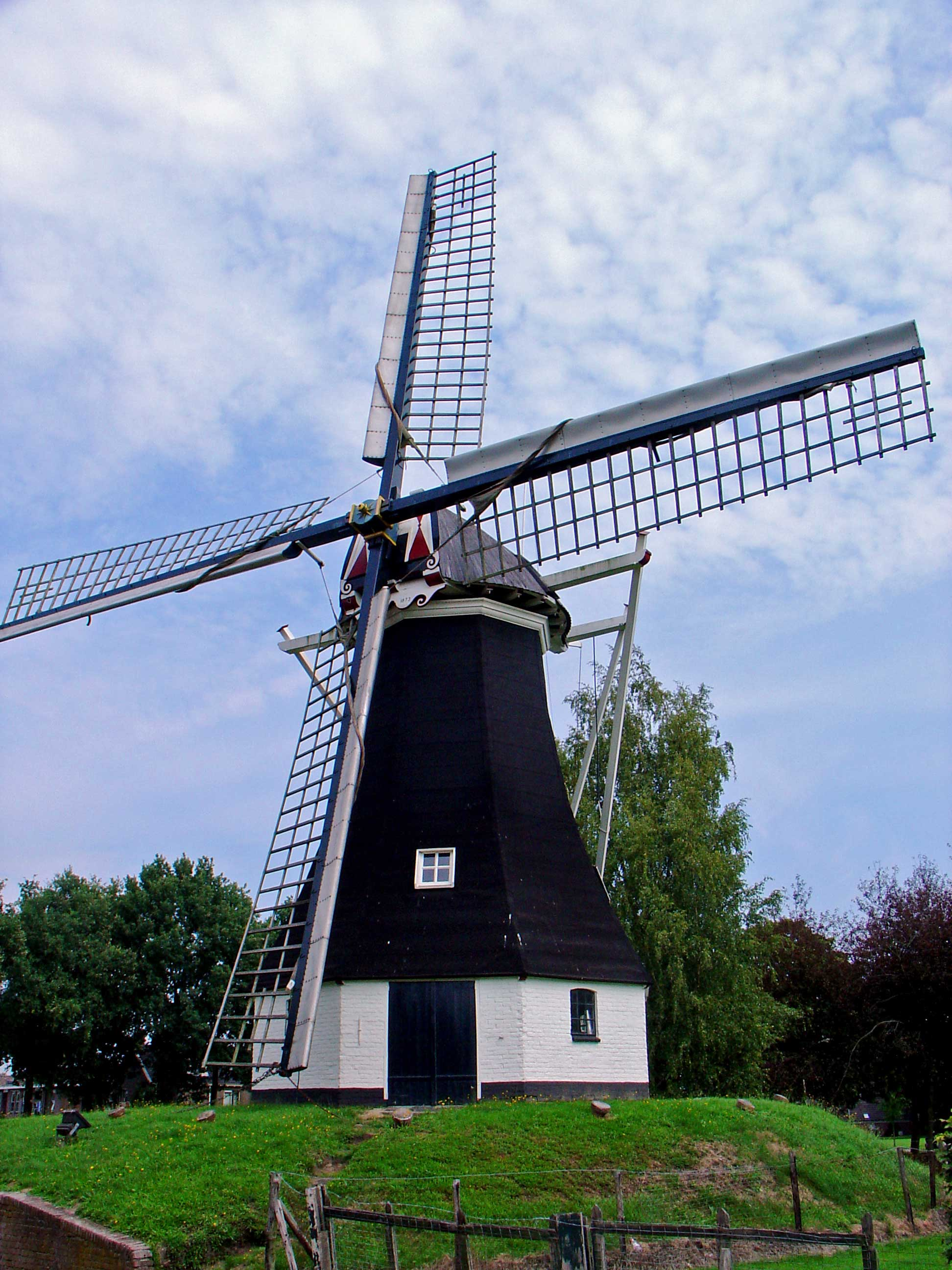
Rolde Windmill

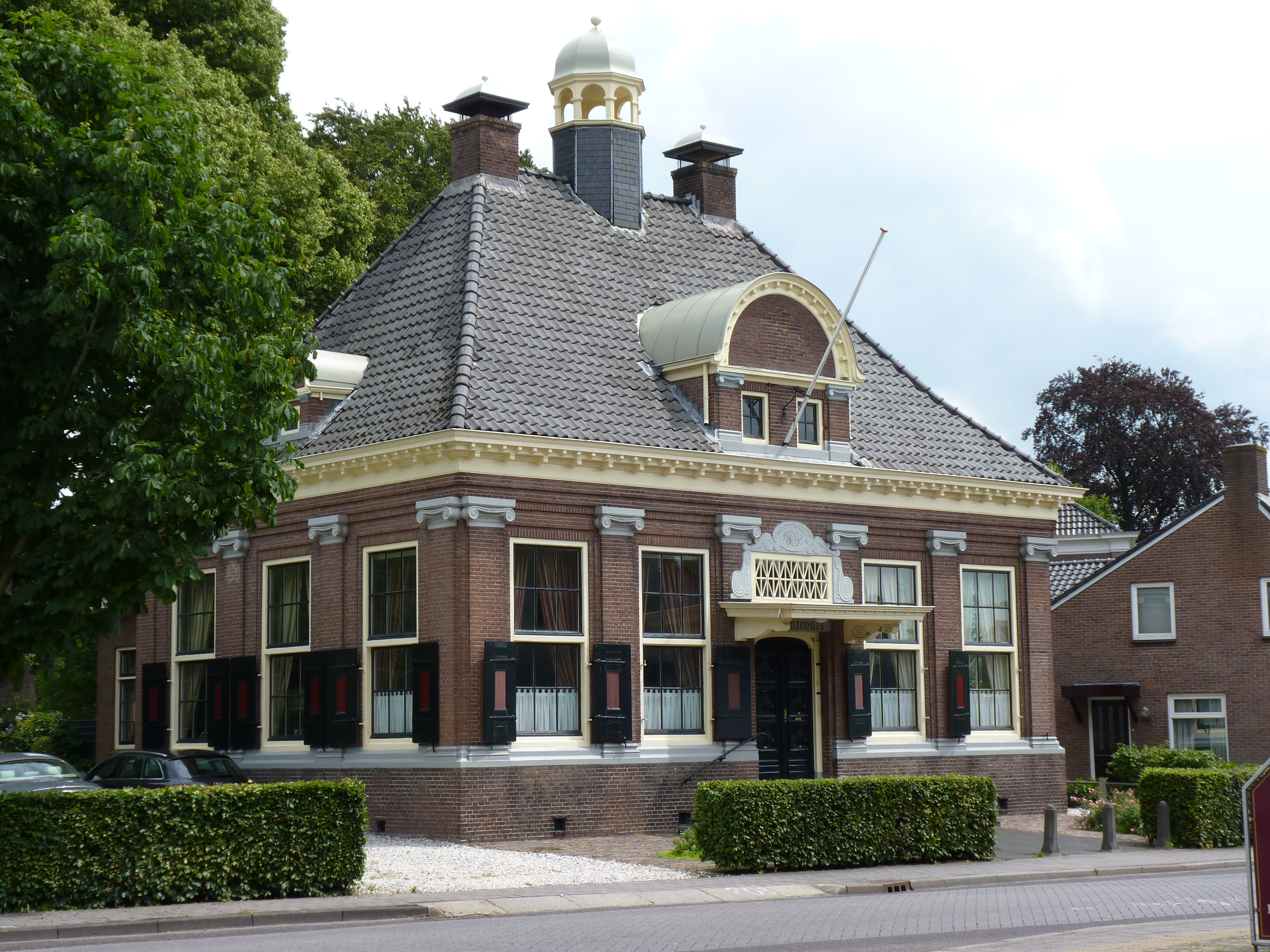
Former town hall

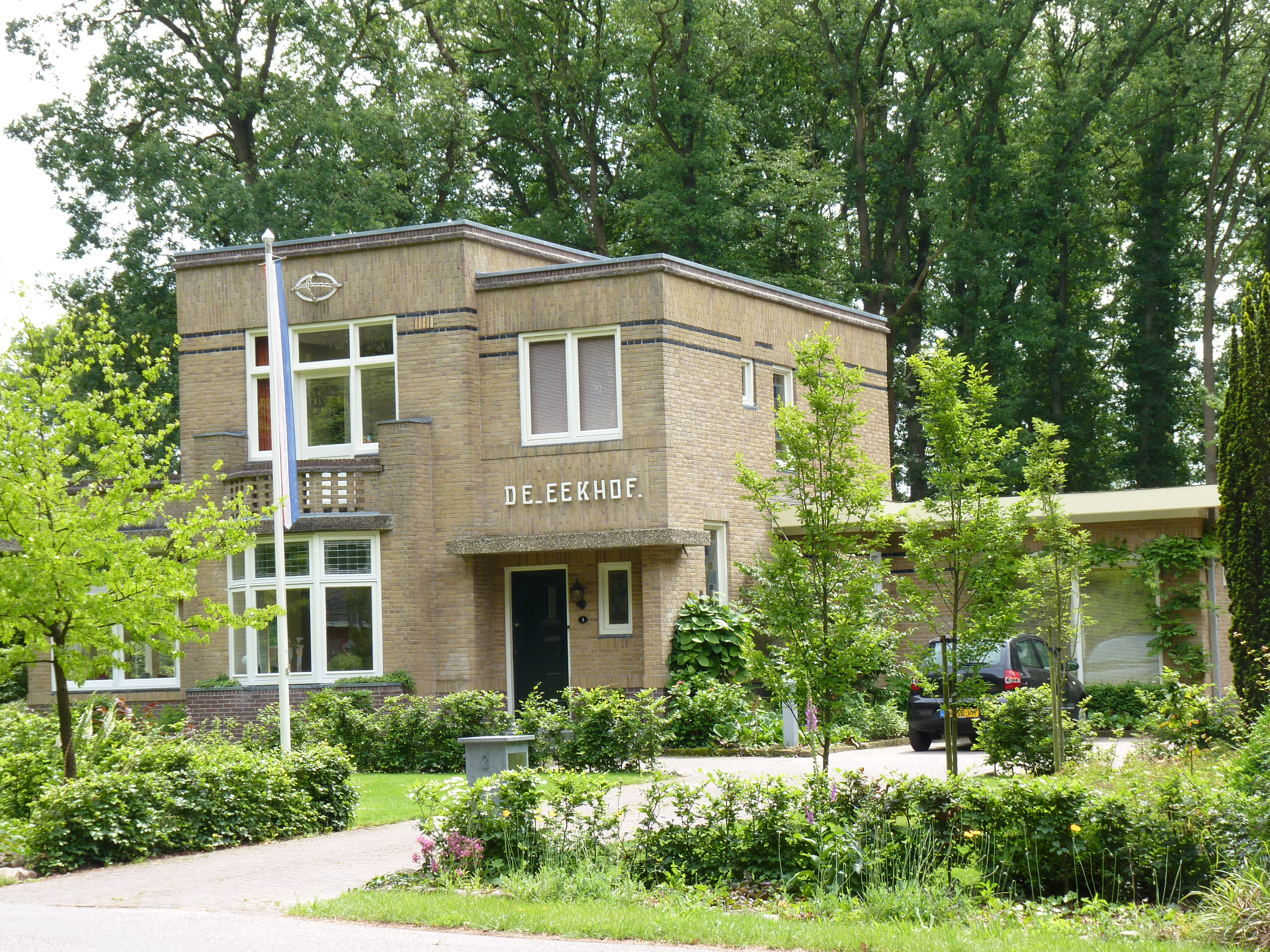
Villa in Rolde
