= Zilverparkkade =

Street in Lelystad, Netherlands

Coordinates: 52°30′21″N 5°28′31″E

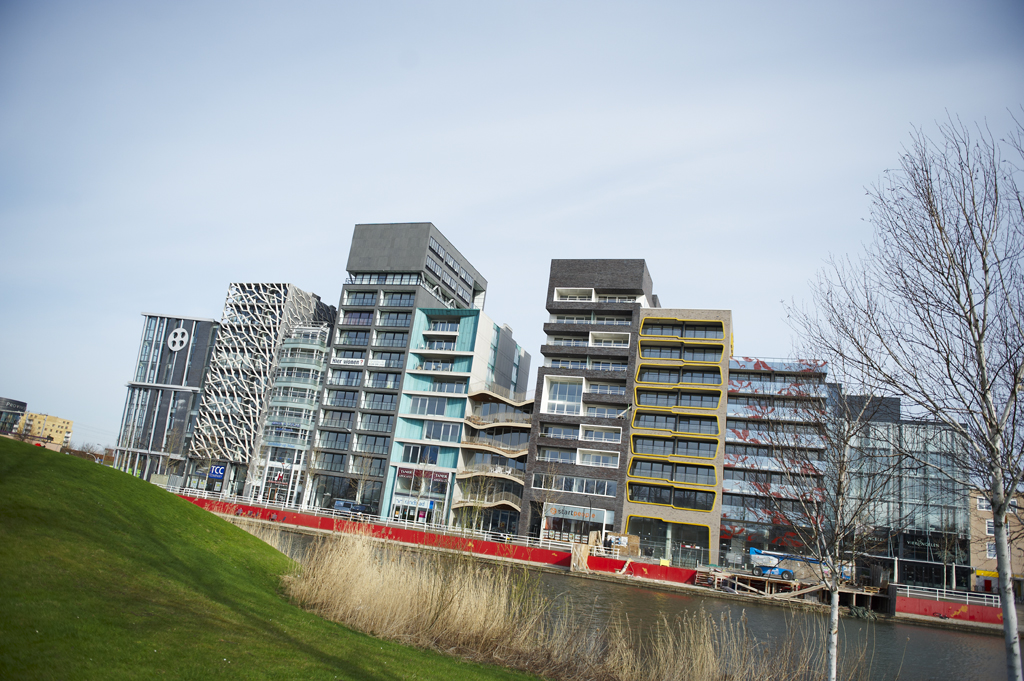
The Zilverparkkade seen from the Zilverpark

Zilverparkkade is a street in Lelystad, Netherlands, containing a continuous row of wall-to-wall buildings constructed between 2002 and 2007. The name is used to refer to the group of buildings as a whole, as they were constructed together as an architectural project within the framework of renovation of the city center of Lelystad. The word kade means "quay" or "embankment", as the buildings face an artificial body of water within a small park called Zilverpark.

The Zilverparkkade was conceptualized by Adriaan Geuze of the urban planning and landscaping bureau West 8, who envisaged it as a mixed development of both office and residential use, with 10 narrow plots for separate buildings of differing height. Every building was designed by a different architect, resulting in a striking postmodernist lineup of facades. The concept of a number of different narrow, tall facades mirrors the historic canal house arrangement typical of many Dutch cities. Due to its modern and tall appearance, it is also compared to arrangements such as the Vlissingen seaside boulevard.

The individual buildings are (from left to right):

== Calliste ==
Designed by Eric van Egeraat of the architectural bureau EEE, Calliste is an office building at the corner of Zilverparkkade.

== Dominor ==
Dominor, designed by René Zuuk, is an office building with a facade adorned by concrete decorations resembling tree branches.

== Koh-I-Noor ==
Named after the famous diamond, it is a work by Rob Bakelaar of Tekta Architecten.

== Fensalir ==
The Fensalir by Jeroen van Schooten (of Van Schooten and Meyer Architecten in Amsterdam) is the tallest building in Zilverparkkade. The ground floor and first floor (mezzanine) are designated for commercial space, storerooms and staircase with access to apartments which fill the upper floors. Floors 11, 12 and 13 form a "head" that stands above the neighbouring buildings, visually separated by the tenth floor breaking the line of the walls and exposing steel girders supporting the upper floors. This break is further emphasized by the upper floors being oriented east-west, providing the inhabitants with views not available from the lower floors and the other buildings, which are oriented north-south. Furthermore, the southern wall, facing Zilverparkkade and the Zilverpark, is "blind" on those floors. The building is named after Fensalir, a location mentioned in Norse mythology.

== Aeratus ==
The Aeratus is a nine-storey building by Pim van der Ven of Mei Architecten en stedenbouwers B.V. of Rotterdam. The five lower levels are devoted to office space, while the four upper ones are apartments. This is apparent from the facade, as only the upper floor levels have balconies. The facade is covered with oxidized copper (verdigris), which is reflected in the name of the building—"aeratus" means "fitted with copper (or bronze or brass)" in Latin.

== The Wave ==
With five storeys, the Wave is the lowest building in Zilverparkkade. Its English-language name, as well as principal theme, was inspired by the wavy bicycle bridge crossing Zilverpark pond. This is reflected by the wavy balcony floors between all levels, blurring the otherwise straight order otherwise reigning on the Zilverparkkade facades (although the building's floors actually follow the set order). The striking design is the work of Bjarne Mastenbroek of Amsterdam's SeARCH bureau.

== Identi ==
The Identi subscribes to the most popular combination in Zilverparkkade by having commercial space on the ground and first floors and apartments from the second storey up. The apartment floors are visually separated from the commercial floors by having balconies placed in white aluminium-lined recesses in the dark brick facade. The painted aluminium casings and facade recesses are used to emphasize the separate apartments, which include a maisonette on the fourth and fifth floor. The building stands out by being taller than most others in Zilverparkkade. Its top, eleventh floor is a penthouse with an atrium and glass roof providing lighting in lieu of the facade, which has been blinded. The Identi, completed in 2007, was designed by Paul van Bussel, who worked for the architecture bureau De Zwarte Hond.

== Jocator and Klusor ==
The Jocator and Klusor were the last two buildings to be completed in Zilverparkkade. Most of the other buildings were completed by 2007, leaving a gap. Harry Abels of IAA Architects of Enschede designed the two very different buildings to fill this gap. The construction of both began on December 19, 2008 and was completed in 2010, bringing the Zilverparkkade to a finished state.

Jocator can be translated from Latin as "joker" or "jester", and the building reflects the theme by having golden "broken smiles" surround its glazed balconies within its brick facade. Ten stories tall, it has commercial and office space on the first two floors and apartments from the second floor on. The Klusor is lower by two stories, and serves as a visual bridge between the Jocator and the lower, recessed "Zilverparkkade 130". This is visually and functionally emphasized by Klusor's large balconies, whose wrapping balustrades are constructed of transparent glass covered with red patterns by the artist Hielke Leuk.

== Zilverparkkade 130 ==
This building formally closes the Zilverparkkade, although a corner building at Stadhauisstraat adjoins it as well. To match the frontage of that building, Zilverparkkade 130 is slightly recessed from the frontage of other Zilverparkkade buildings. Zilverparkkade 130 features a restaurant stretching from the ground floor through first floor, and office space from the second to sixth floors. Most office floors have 192 square meters of lettable office space. The third floor houses a meeting room, while the sixth floor features another meeting room / office space of 67 square meters adjoining a terrace atop the fifth floor. The office floors have a double-skin facade with accessible balconies between the two glass "skins". Zilverparkkade 130 was designed by Jouke Post, Aart van der Meulen and Constantin White of XX architecten (Rotterdam) and completed between 2006 and 2007.
