= Daan Brandenburg =

Dutch chess grandmaster (born 1987)

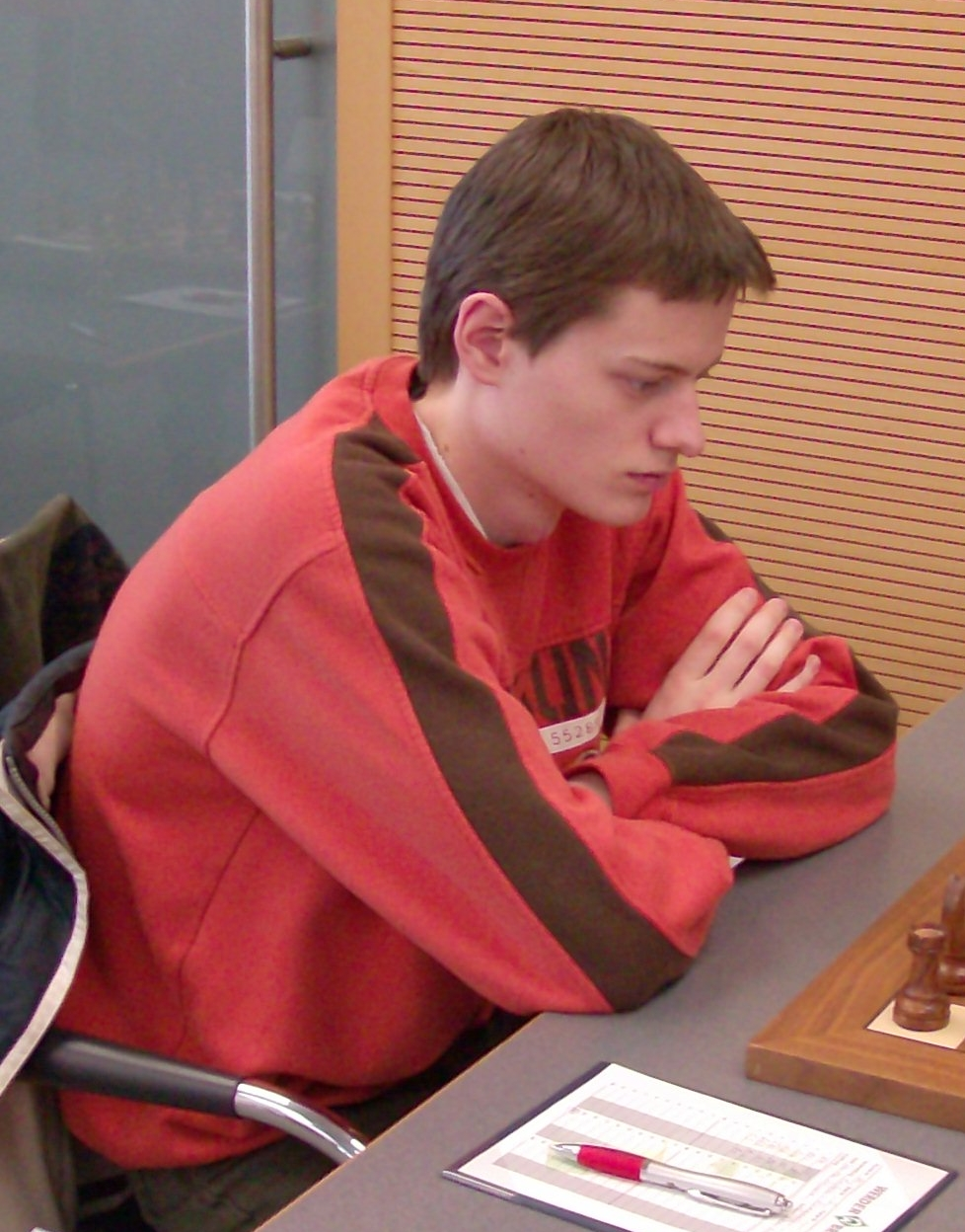

Personal information
- Born: November 14, 1987 (age 38) Lelystad, Netherlands

Chess career
- Country: Netherlands
- Title: Grandmaster (2011)
- FIDE rating: 2449 (July 2026)
- Peak rating: 2538 (July 2011)

Daan Brandenburg (born November 14, 1987) is a Dutch chess grandmaster.

== Chess career ==
Born in 1987, Brandenburg became an International Master in 2007 and earned the Grandmaster title in 2011. He is the No. 28 ranked Dutch player as of June 2018.

== Personal life ==
In 2014, he began taking classes in the master's degree program in multilingualism at the University of Groningen's Leeuwarden campus.
