= Batavia Stad Fashion Outlet =

Factory outlet center in the Netherlands

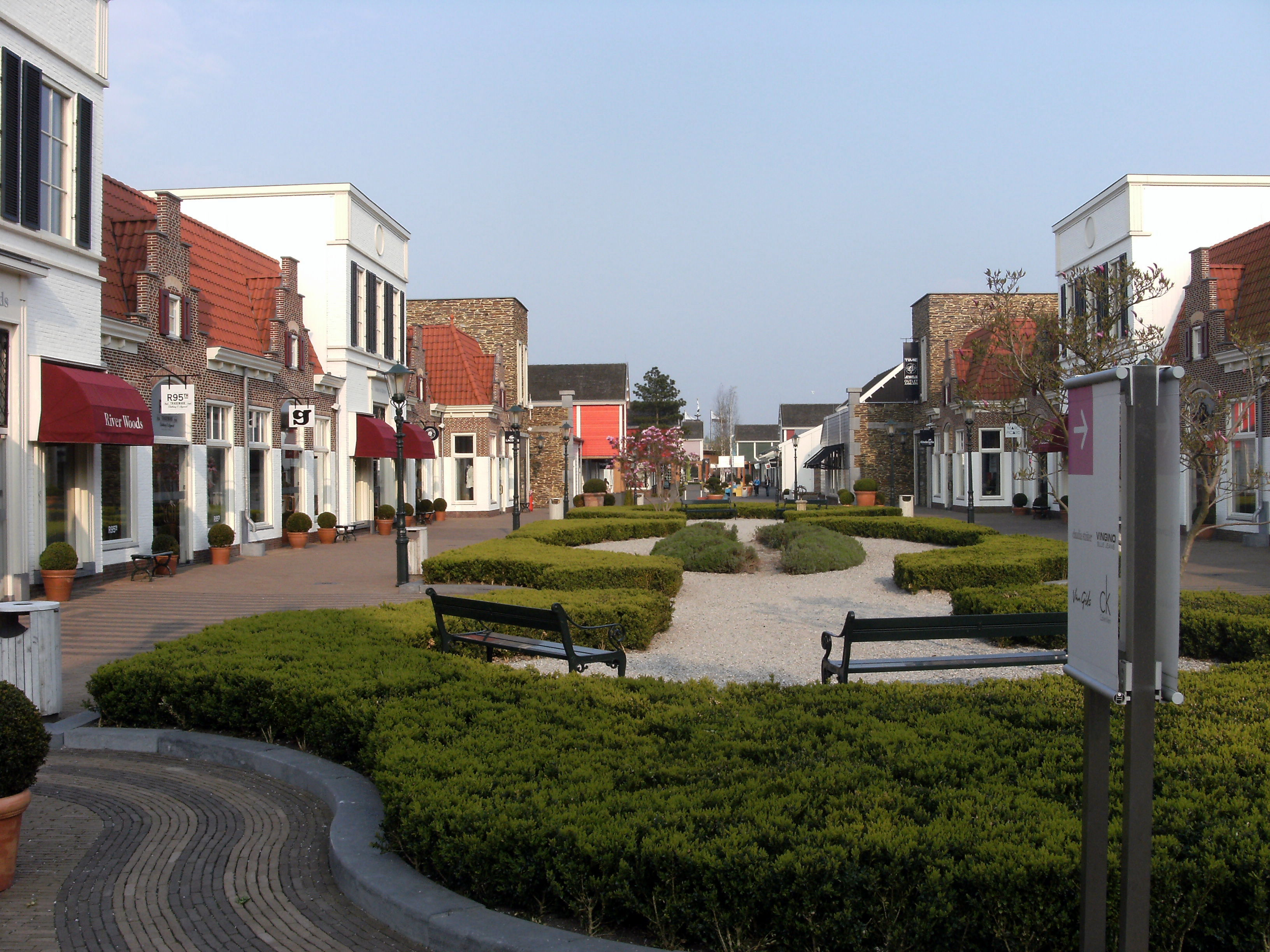
- The main street of Batavia Stad - Bataviaplein - in 2011
- Etymology: Named after the former capital of the Dutch Indies

General information
- Architectural style: New Urbanism
- Location: Lelystad, The Netherlands
- Opened: 2001
- Owner: VIA Outlets

Technical details
- Grounds: 31,000 square metres (330,000 sq ft)

Design and construction
- Architecture firm: Attika Architekten

Other information
- Parking: 62,000 square metres (670,000 sq ft)

Website
- bataviastad.nl

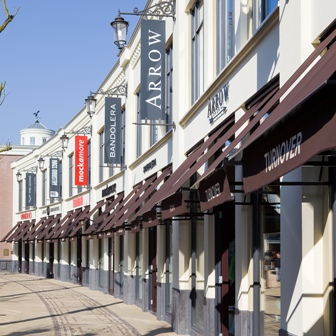

Batavia Stad Fashion Outlet is a factory outlet center located in Lelystad, Netherlands.

It was the first fashion outlet center in the Netherlands.

The outlet is named after the ship Batavia from 1628.
