= Lelystad =

City and municipality in Flevoland, Netherlands

- City and Municipality
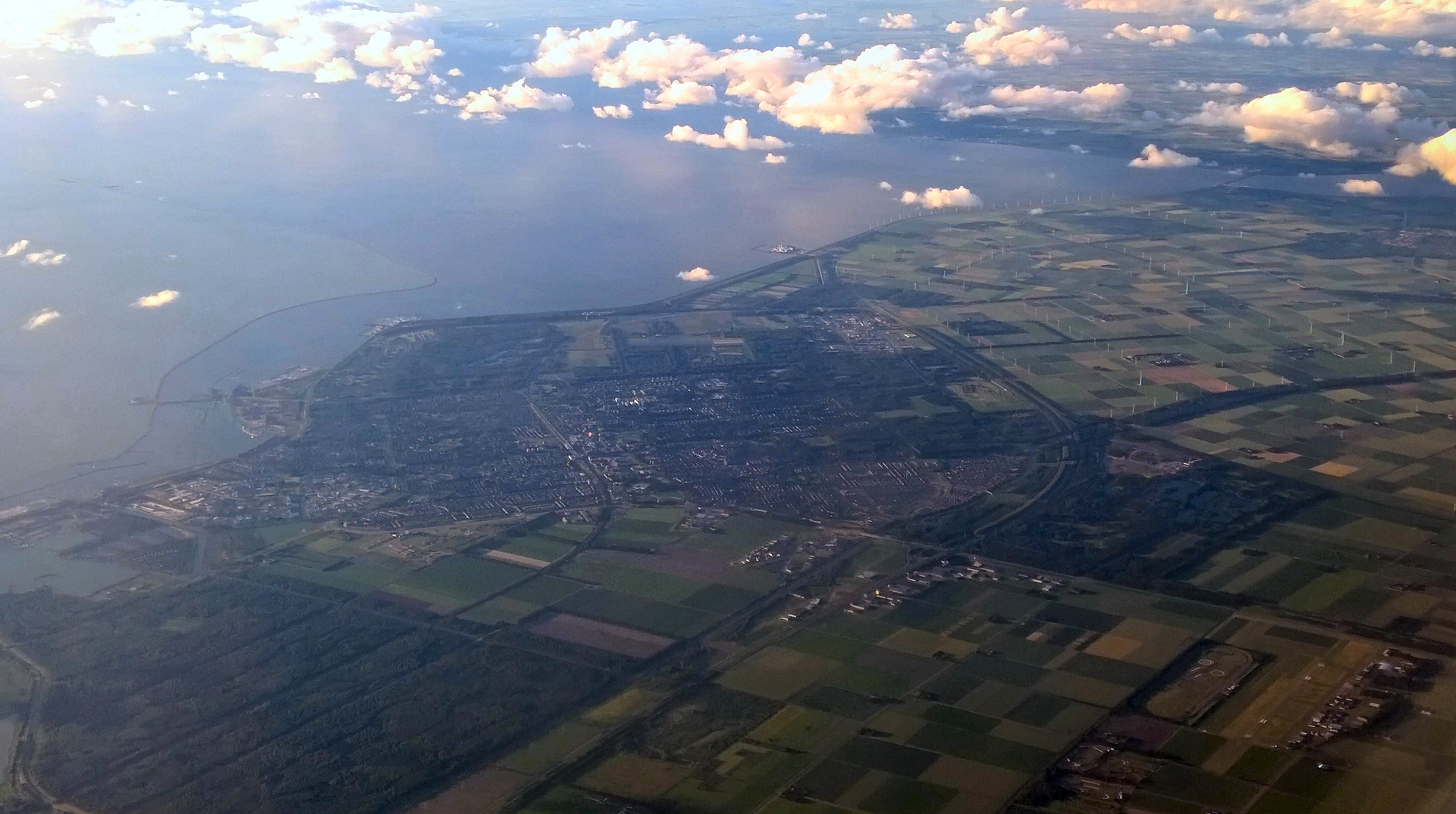
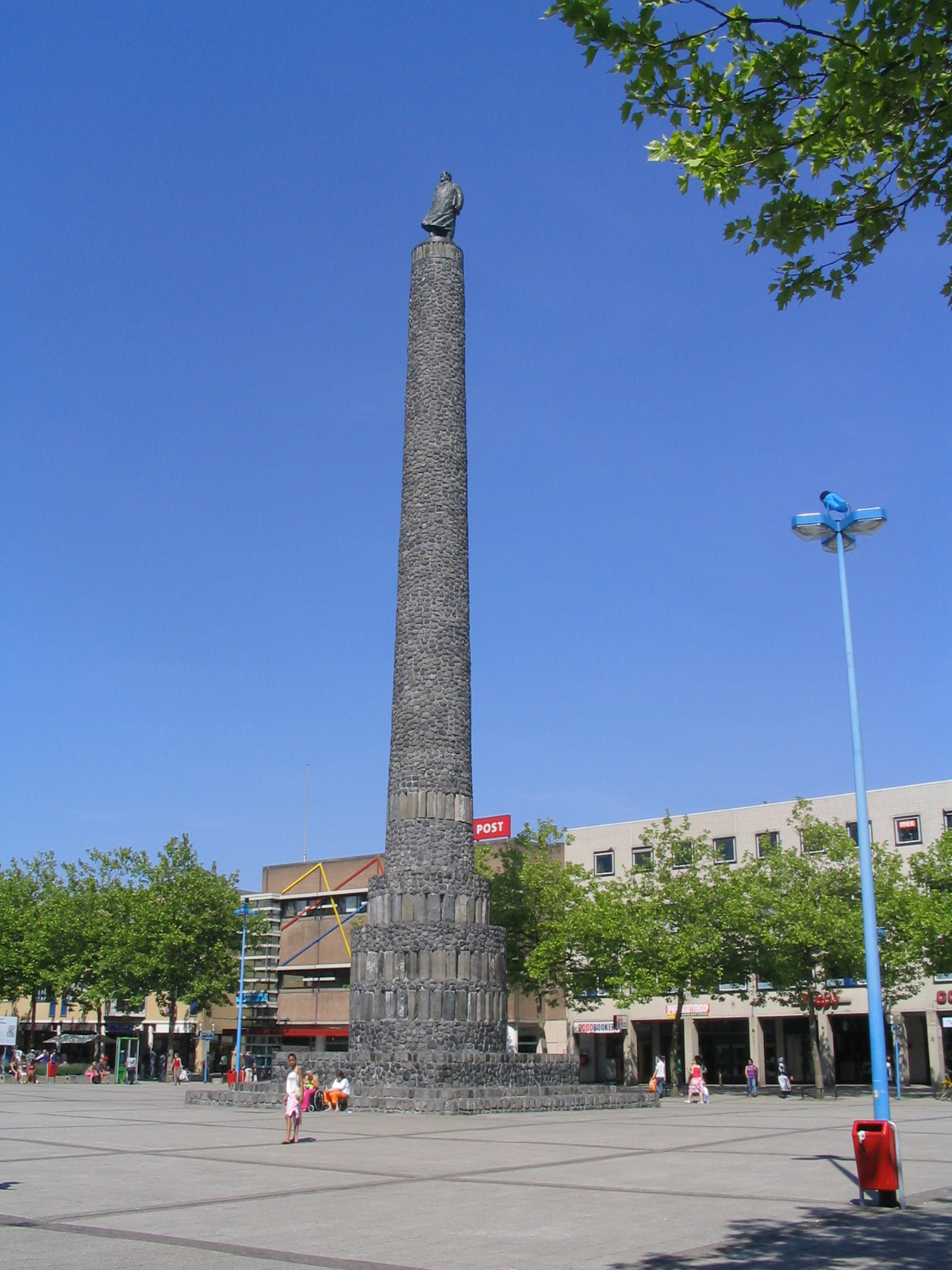
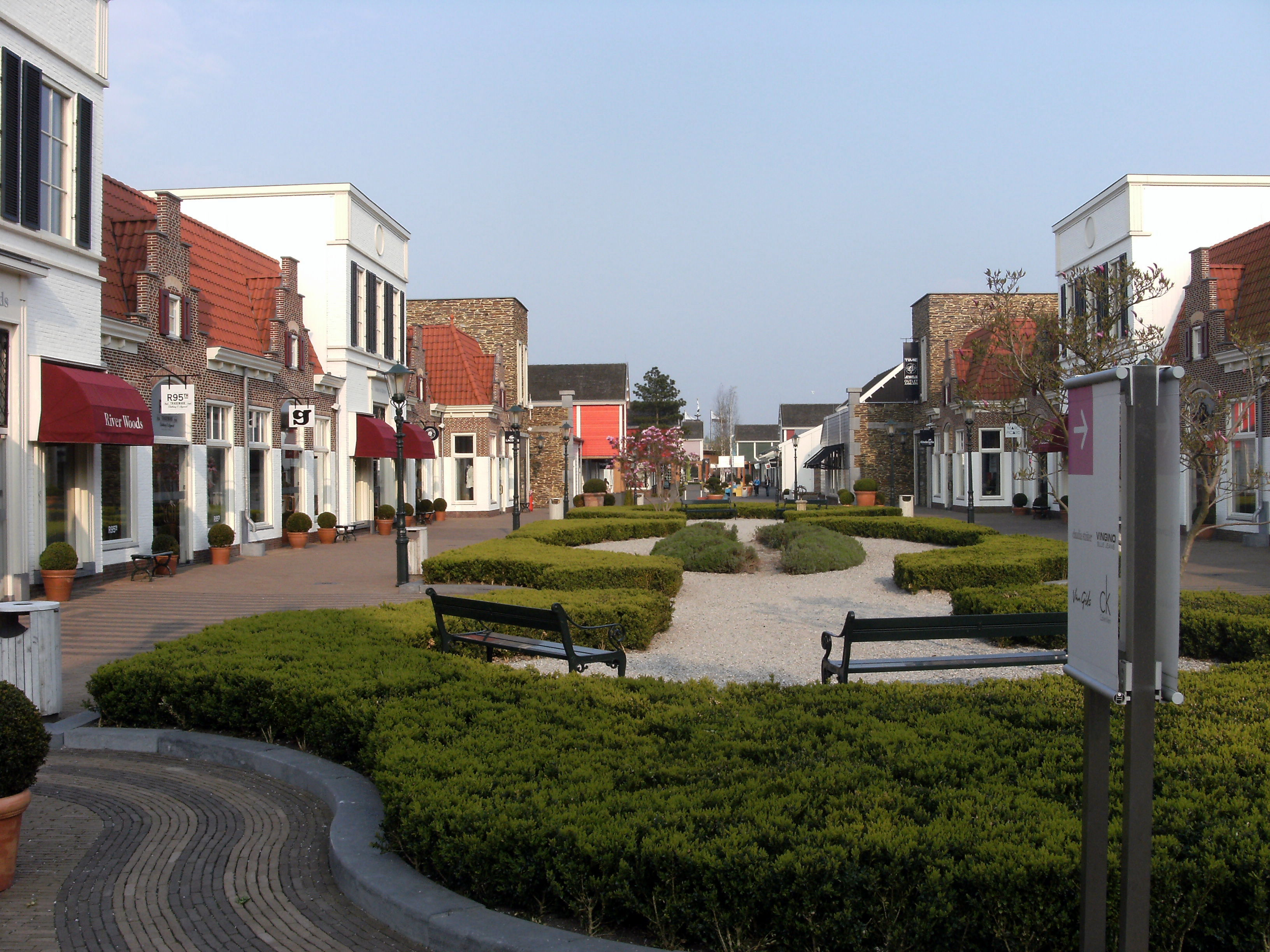
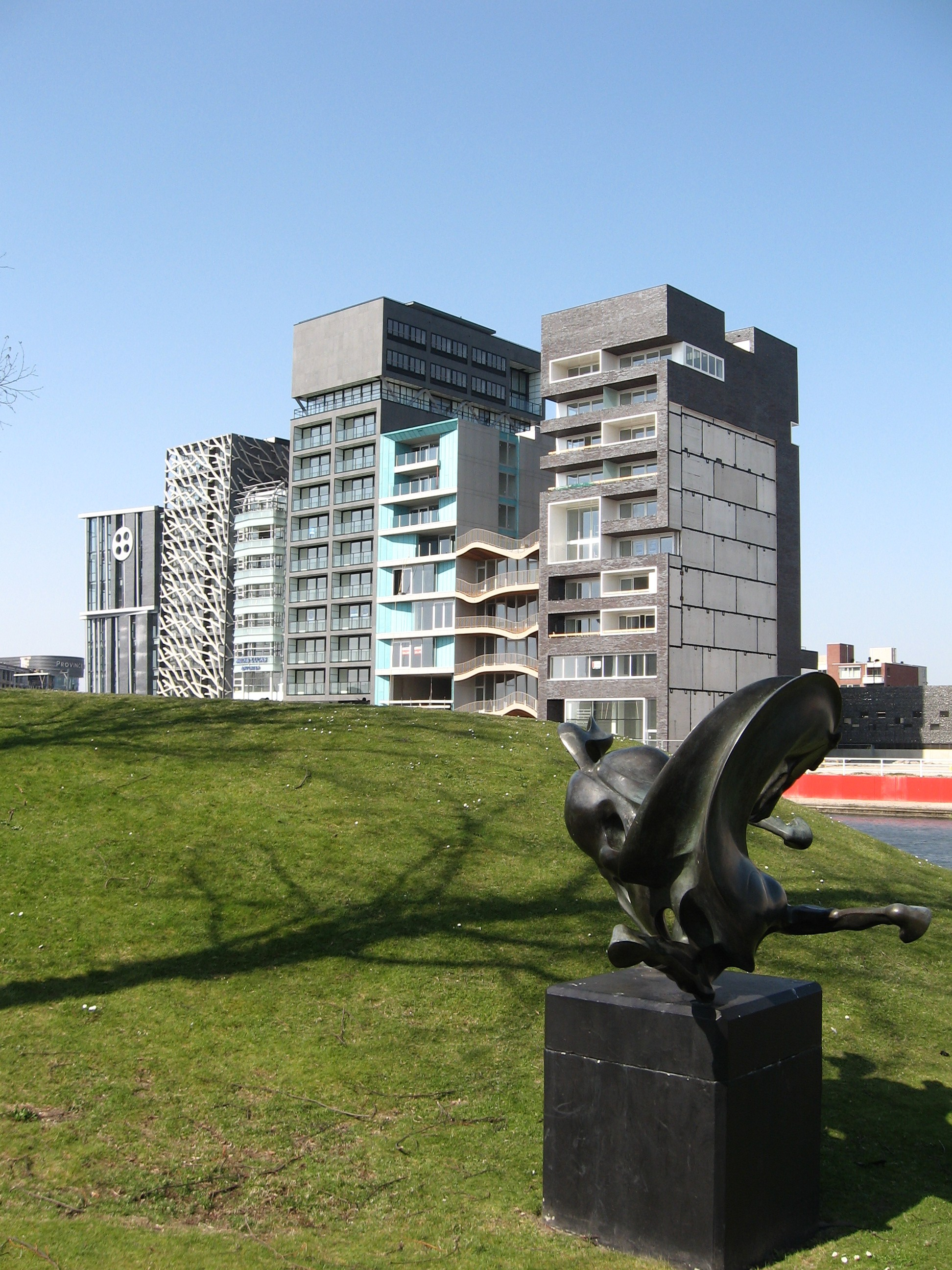
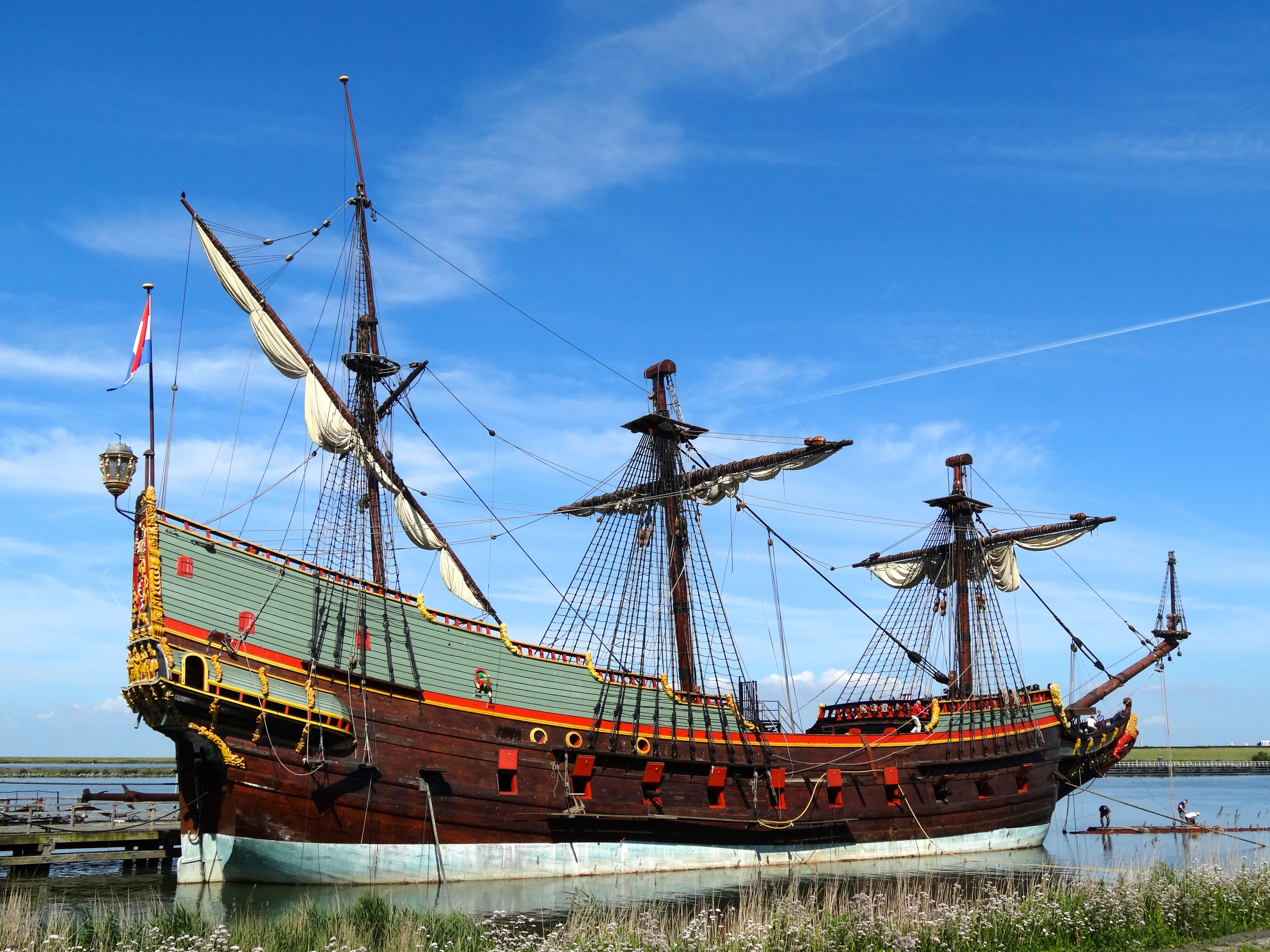
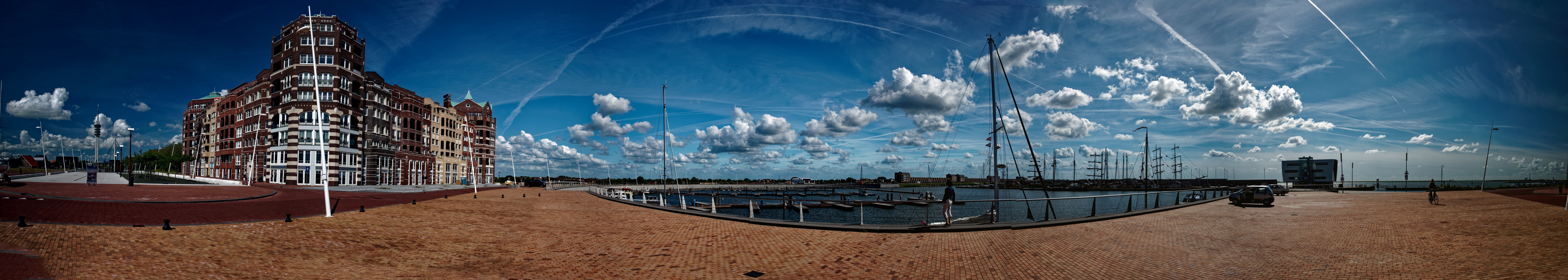
- Aerial view of the city Zuil van Lely in the city center Batavia Stad Zilverparkkade Replica of the Batavia Bataviahaven

- Flag Coat of arms Brandmark

- Location in Flevoland

- Location within the Netherlands Location within Europe Lelystad (Europe)
- Coordinates: 52°30′N 5°29′E
- Country: Netherlands
- Province: Flevoland
- Region: Amsterdam metropolitan area
- Established: 1 January 1967

Government
  - Body: Municipal council
  - Mayor: Mieke Baltus (CDA)

Area
  - Total: 765.45 km^{2} (295.54 sq mi)
  - Land: 230.32 km^{2} (88.93 sq mi)
  - Water: 535.13 km^{2} (206.61 sq mi)
- Elevation: −3 m (−9.8 ft)

Population (January 2021)
  - Total: 79,811
  - Density: 347/km^{2} (900/sq mi)
- Time zone: UTC+1 (CET)
  - Summer (DST): UTC+2 (CEST)
- Postcode: 8200–8249
- Area code: 0320
- Website: www.lelystad.nl

Lelystad (Dutch pronunciation: [ˈleːlistɑt]) is a Dutch municipality and the capital city of the province of Flevoland in the central Netherlands. The city, built on reclaimed land, was founded in 1967 and was named after Cornelis Lely, who engineered the Afsluitdijk that made the reclamation possible. Lelystad is situated approximately three metres (10 feet) below sea level.

== History ==
Lelystad is built on the seabed of the former Zuiderzee. About 6,500 years ago, this wetland was above high tide level and inhabited; the Netherlands have steadily subsided since. Near Lelystad at Swifterbant, the oldest human skeletons in Western Europe were discovered. Due to rising water levels and storms, the peatlands were washed away, and the Lacus Flevo (in Roman times) grew to be the Almere (Middle Ages) and became the Zuiderzee. The Zuiderzee (Southern Sea) was the main transport route from Amsterdam to the North Sea and the Hanseatic League cities. Due to the many shipwrecks in Flevoland, Lelystad now houses the National Centre for Maritime History, with a museum and the shipyard that has built the Batavia replica.

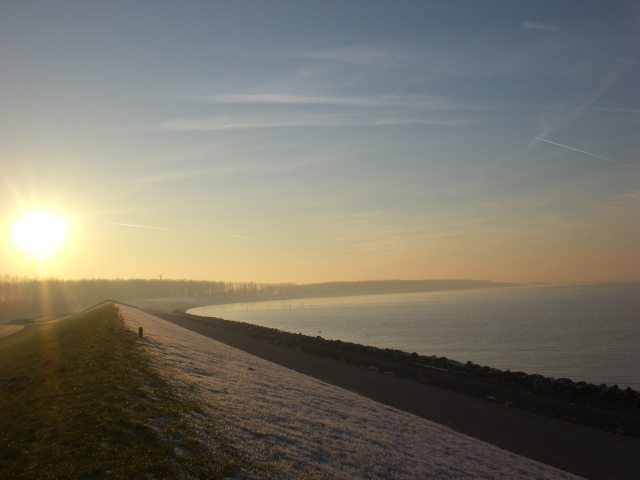
Sunset over the IJsselmeer, bordering Lelystad

After the Second World War the Zuiderzee Works continued, constructing the polder of Eastern Flevoland. In 1950 work commenced on several construction islands in the middle of the IJsselmeer. Lelystad-Haven was the largest island, and its wooden barracks housed a community of dyke-builders. In 1955 they reached the mainland, which made it possible to drive to Lelystad by car. One of the three pumping stations, which drained the polder in June 1957, was the diesel-powered Wortman in Lelystad-Haven. Until 1967 the only inhabitants of Lelystad were technical engineers, laborers and superintendents, living on the former construction island.

== Demographics ==
=== Ethnic composition ===
As of 2023,

- 65% of the population was of Dutch background (two parents born in the Netherlands)
- 23% was of non-Western migration background (one or two parents born in a non-Western country)
- 12% was of Western migration background (one or two parents born in a Western country).

Lelystad has a large population of Surinamese origin (5,225); most residents of a non-Western background live in the east of the city. Lelystad also has significant Moroccan (2,615) and Turkish (2,278) communities, most of whom reside in the northeastern part of the city. There were 2,059 residents with an Antillean background.

== Climate ==
Climate data for Lelystad (1991−2020 normals, extremes 1990−present)
Month	Jan	Feb	Mar	Apr	May	Jun	Jul	Aug	Sep	Oct	Nov	Dec	Year
Record high °C (°F)	14.3 (57.7)	18.8 (65.8)	23.2 (73.8)	29.6 (85.3)	32.2 (90.0)	33.1 (91.6)	37.5 (99.5)	34.7 (94.5)	32.0 (89.6)	26.0 (78.8)	19.9 (67.8)	14.6 (58.3)	37.5 (99.5)
Mean daily maximum °C (°F)	5.7 (42.3)	6.5 (43.7)	10.0 (50.0)	14.4 (57.9)	18.0 (64.4)	20.4 (68.7)	22.6 (72.7)	22.5 (72.5)	19.1 (66.4)	14.4 (57.9)	9.5 (49.1)	6.2 (43.2)	14.1 (57.4)
Daily mean °C (°F)	3.2 (37.8)	3.5 (38.3)	6.0 (42.8)	9.5 (49.1)	13.2 (55.8)	15.8 (60.4)	17.8 (64.0)	17.6 (63.7)	14.6 (58.3)	10.7 (51.3)	6.8 (44.2)	3.9 (39.0)	10.2 (50.4)
Mean daily minimum °C (°F)	0.6 (33.1)	0.4 (32.7)	2.0 (35.6)	4.3 (39.7)	8.0 (46.4)	10.8 (51.4)	12.7 (54.9)	12.4 (54.3)	10.1 (50.2)	6.9 (44.4)	3.9 (39.0)	1.4 (34.5)	6.1 (43.0)
Record low °C (°F)	−16.6 (2.1)	−22.9 (−9.2)	−17.8 (0.0)	−6.4 (20.5)	−1.6 (29.1)	1.8 (35.2)	5.0 (41.0)	4.2 (39.6)	2.4 (36.3)	−4.8 (23.4)	−8.3 (17.1)	−16.9 (1.6)	−22.9 (−9.2)
Average precipitation mm (inches)	67.7 (2.67)	57.2 (2.25)	55.1 (2.17)	42.3 (1.67)	57.2 (2.25)	67.0 (2.64)	91.4 (3.60)	92.1 (3.63)	74.2 (2.92)	76.3 (3.00)	69.7 (2.74)	73.9 (2.91)	824.1 (32.44)
Average precipitation days (≥ 1.0 mm)	12.1	11.2	9.9	8.4	10.0	10.1	11.4	11.6	10.8	11.7	12.6	12.9	132.8
Average relative humidity (%)	88.9	86.5	82.0	76.1	75.3	78.0	79.6	80.8	84.4	87.3	90.4	90.5	83.3
Mean monthly sunshine hours	66.6	95.6	146.2	194.5	227.1	213.3	222.5	200.9	156.6	122.0	68.8	57.0	1,771.1
Percentage possible sunshine	25.9	34.1	39.4	46.6	46.6	42.5	44.1	44.0	41.0	36.9	26.0	23.7	37.6
Source: Royal Netherlands Meteorological Institute

== Landscape ==
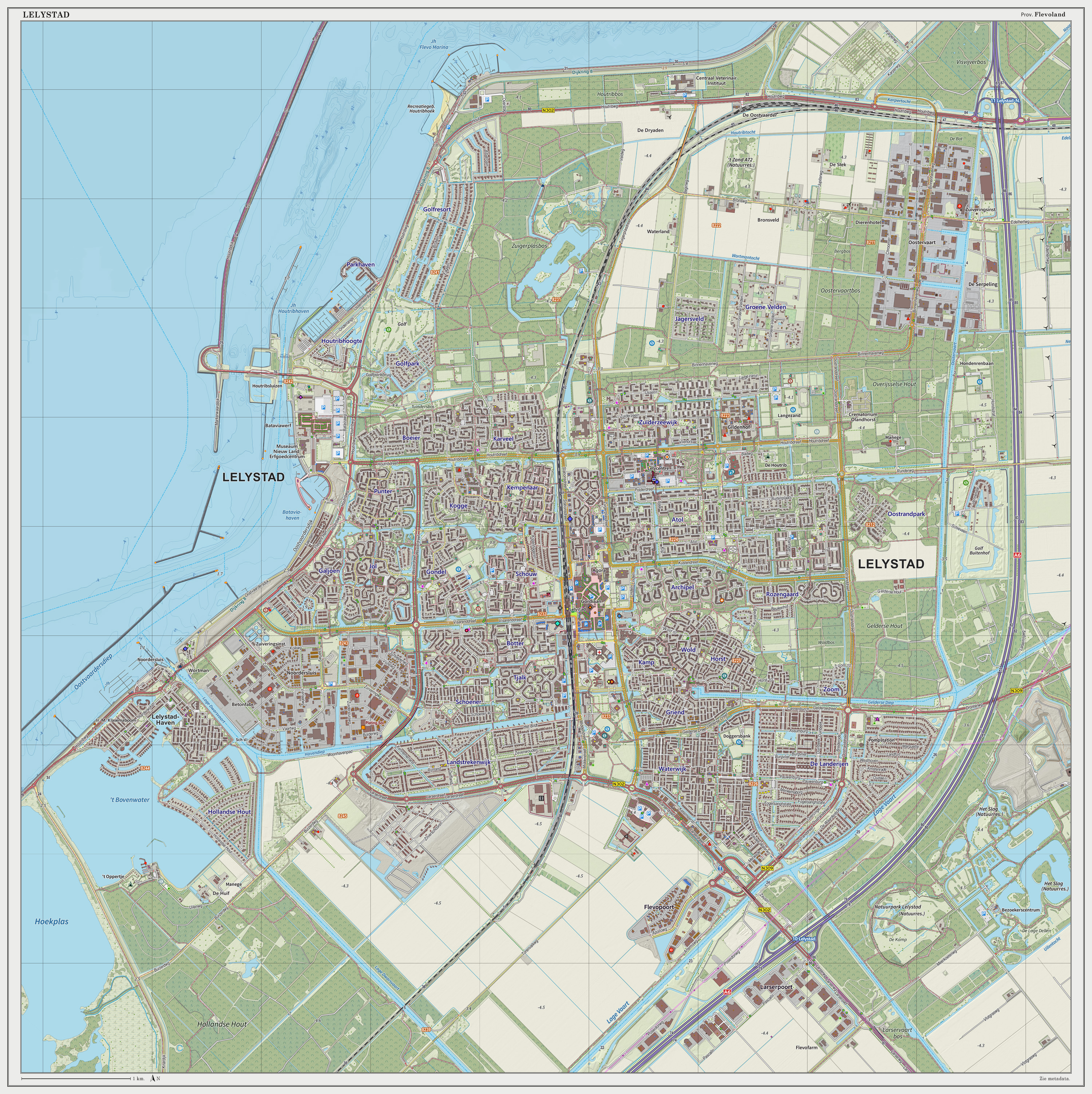
Dutch topographic map of Lelystad (city), March 2014

Lelystad is the largest municipality in the Netherlands in area, but a large part of that area is water: Markermeer and IJsselmeer. Another major area is the internationally famous nature park of Oostvaardersplassen, which arose naturally when the polder of South Flevoland was drained. Lelystad is also surrounded by a square of woodlands and parks and flat farmland. The importance of the landscape and sky is emphasized by several pieces of land art: engineers' work and works such as the Observatorium by Robert Morris.

The artificial islands of Marker Wadden lie immediately to the northwest of Lelystad. Construction started in 2016, and the first islands have already become important wildlife sites, with many species of birds coming to the islands during the breeding season.

== Tourism ==
Lelystad has several tourist attractions, including:

- The replica of the 17th-century ship Batavia at the Batavia Shipyard
- Batavia Stad Fashion Outlet
- Hanzestad Compagnie, a fleet of historical sailing ships
- Lelystad Nature Park
- National Aviation Theme Park Aviodrome
- Modern architecture, for example the Zilverparkkade and Agora Theatre

Lelystad hosts many one-day events like the Lelystad Airshow, the Water Festival, the National Old Timer Day, Lelystad Speedway, Architecture day and several sports events. On the Midland Circuit many motor, kart and stock car racing events and several autoclub meetings are held. On the coast there are several marinas.

== Transport ==
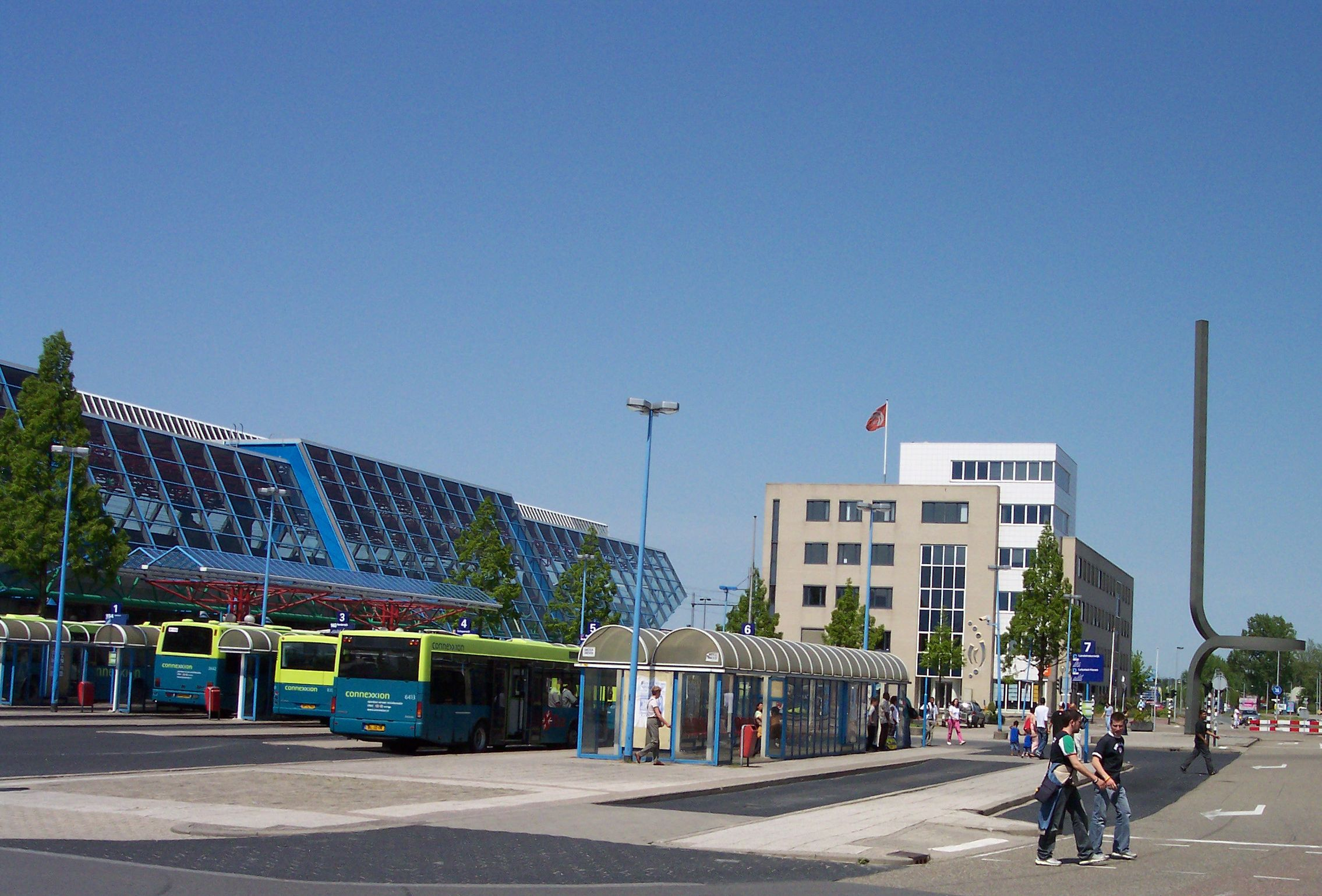
Lelystad Centrum railway station

Lelystad can be reached by air, water, and land.

=== Air ===
Lelystad Airport is the biggest general aviation airport in the Netherlands. It is owned wholly by Schiphol Group. Lelystad Airport has undergone major expansion, including the construction of a passenger terminal for commercial flights, as well as an extension of the runway. The original plan for this airport was to become the main gateway for passengers into the country, to alleviate some of the pressure from Schiphol Airport in Amsterdam. In turn, Schiphol would be able to focus on its role as international hub for lay-overs. Although the expansion of Lelystad Airport has been finished, the airport has not yet opened for passengers due to various political reasons. As of 2022, the government has decided to delay the opening of the terminals with at least two years, and even then the opening will not be guaranteed.

=== Water ===
Lelystad has a small inland port, several marinas, and a canal system which also functions to aid in managing the water levels in the rest of the polder. The canal system connects to the Markermeer with a lock to the southwest of Lelystad, and connects the city and its industrial areas to all other towns and their respective industrial areas in the polder.

=== Rail ===
the Weesp–Lelystad railway (Flevolijn) extends south from Lelystad Centrum railway station and connects the city with Almere, and to the Randstad region beyond. The Lelystad–Zwolle railway (Hanzelijn) extends north from Lelystad and connects it with Dronten, Kampen and Zwolle.

=== Motorway ===
The A6 motorway runs along the eastern side of the city. There are three junctions connecting this motorway to Lelystad, allowing traffic to travel northbound to Emmeloord and the province of Friesland, or southbound to Almere and the Randstad region.

=== Provincial roads ===
The N302 provincial road connects Lelystad to the south-east with Harderwijk and the province of Gelderland beyond. The N307 connects Lelystad across the Houtribdijk to Enkhuizen and the province of North Holland beyond, and to Dronten and beyond that to Kampen in the province of Overijssel. The N309 connects Lelystad to Dronten and beyond that to Elburg in the province of Gelderland.

== Shield and flag ==
The honeycomb grid in the arms of Lelystad represents the dykes, built with six-edged concrete or basalt blocks. The colour gold indicates the high costs of the project of making the polder. The centre shield is the arms of engineer Cornelis Lely. The sealions reflect the history of the land.

In the flag, the fleur-de-lis (lily) again takes a central point, referring to the name Lely. The yellow background reflects the precious land, and the blue lines the dykes and waterways. The flag of the province is similarly adorned with the fleur-de-lis to commemorate Lely.

== Notable residents ==
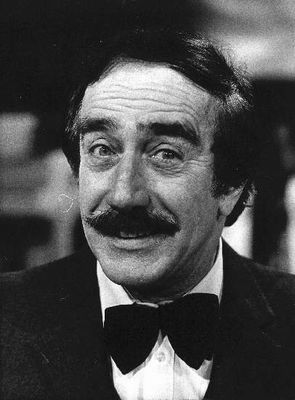
Bueno de Mesquita

- Abraham Bueno de Mesquita (1918–2005) comedian and actor
- Nancy van Overveldt (1930–2015), artist
- Hans Gruijters (1931–2005), politician and journalist
- Hubert Fermina (1948–2022), nurse and politician
- Gylan Kain (1942–2024), American poet and playwright
- Michiel van Hulten (born 1969), former politician and MEP (1999–2004)
- Edsilia Rombley (born 1978), singer
- Rianne ten Haken (born 1986), a Dutch model

=== Sport ===
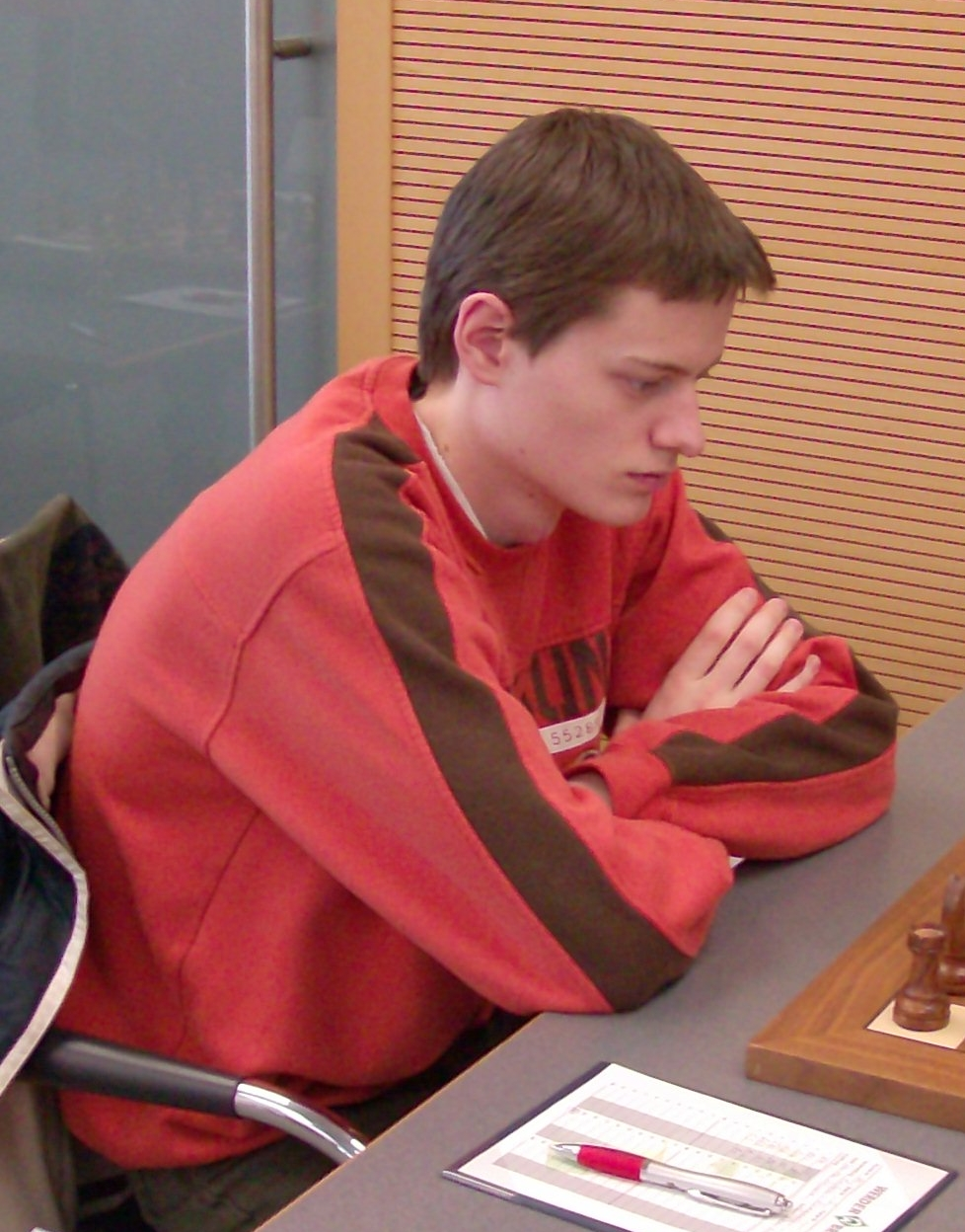
Daan Brandenburg, 2009

- Co Stompé (born 1962), retired professional darts player
- Aron Winter (born 1967), retired footballer and football manager
- Ivan Sokolov (born 1968), Dutch-Bosnian chess grandmaster
- Chiel Warners (born 1978), former decathlete
- Charles Zwolsman Jr. (born 1979), racing car driver
- Karin Ruckstuhl (born 1980), former heptathlete
- Guido van der Valk (born 1980), professional golfer
- Ruben Schaken (born 1982), football player
- Niels de Ruiter (born 1983), former darts player, current director of the Dutch Darts Federation
- Thijs van Valkengoed (born 1983), breaststroke swimmer, competed at the 2004 and the 2008 Summer Olympics
- Boy Waterman (born 1984), football goalkeeper
- Daan Brandenburg (born 1987), chess grandmaster
- Nathaniël Will (born 1989), footballer
- Benjamin Bok (born 1995), chess grandmaster
- Alex Vlaar (born 1996), Dutch-Bulgarian badminton player
- Devyne Rensch (born 2003), football player for AFC Ajax and the Netherlands national football team

== Twin city ==
Lelystad maintains international relations with the Suriname twin city of Lelydorp.
