= Jos C.N. Raadschelders =

Scholar of public administration

Jos C.N. Raadschelders is a scholar of public administration. He is a professor at the John Glenn College of Public Affairs at Ohio State University and also held an honorary appointment at the University of Leiden. Raadschelders is the former managing editor of Public Administration Review (2006–2011) and in 2012 received the Chester A. Newland Presidential Citation of Merit from the American Society of Public Administration. He now serves as Co-Editor in Chief of Public Administration Review (starting January 2024). He has written twenty-five books and more than 160 articles and chapters within the interdisciplinary field of public administration.

Raadschelders' research has covered three broad areas, including administrative history, comparative administration, and the role of philosophy in public administration research. His 2011 Oxford University Press book "Public Administration: The Interdisciplinary Study of Government", crosses all three of these sub-fields, and has received several positive reviews in the journals of public administration. This OUP book is an epistemology of the study and was complemented in 2020 with a social ontology of government titled "The Three Ages of Government: From the Person, to the Group, to the World" (University of Michigan Press).
