= Leonard van Veldhoven =

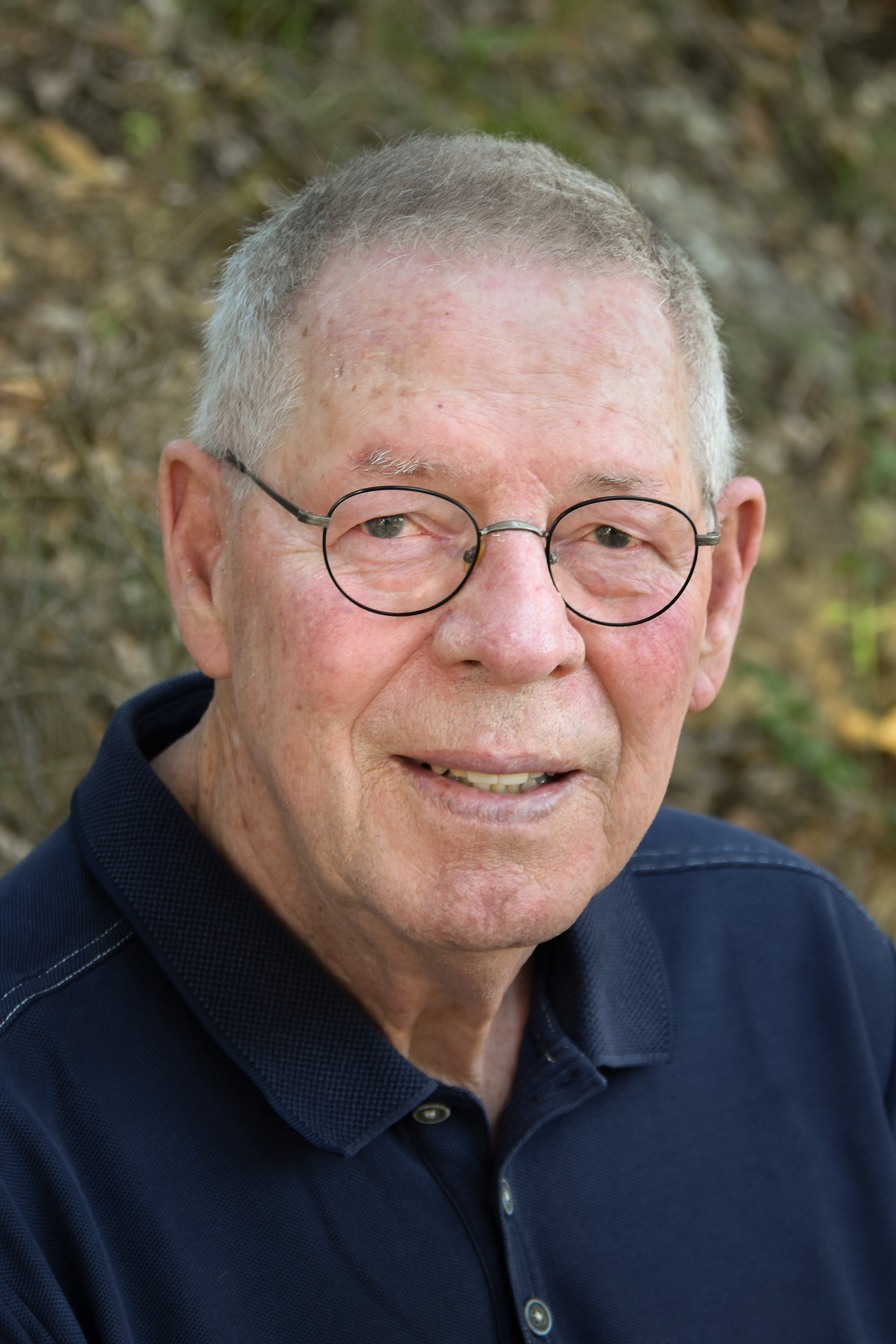
Image of Leonard

Leonard van Veldhoven is a Dutch architect, hotelier, traveler and writer.

== Biography ==
In 1975, he founded his architectural firm, Van Veldhoven Partners. In 1985 Van Veldhoven founded Bastion Hotels, a hotel chain which expanded to 32 locations, including one in Germany, over the following decade.

In 1995, Van Veldhoven shifted his focus from architecture and hospitality to travel and writing. His travels through the Americas from 1996 to 1999, and a subsequent six-year sailing journey beginning in 2000 with his wife, artist Miriam Janssen, inspired a series of travel narratives and a novel titled The White Sky.

As a student he bought his first Comtoise clock, a typical French grandfather or longcase clock. In later years, during frequent visits to the Haut-Jura, the birthplace of this iconic timepiece, he repeatedly asked himself: How did this timepiece originate, and why exactly here? Years of research led to the reference work MAYET MORBIER COMTOISE (in four languages). He also published the quadrilingual Comtoise dictionary.

After relocating to Montolieu, France, in 2005, he continued his research into local history and clockmaking, resulting in publications that detail the village's heritage and the lives of a local clockmaking family through turbulent historical periods, such as Montolieu, son histoire et ses horlogers and A box full of memories, chronicle of a French family in turbulent times: 1835-1964.

== Bibliography ==
• 1998 Naar het Verre Noorden van Amerika (de reis) To the Far South of America (The Voyage)

• 1999 Naar het Verre Zuiden van Amerika (de reis) To the Far South of America (The Voyage)

• 1999 Naar het Hart van Amerika (de reis) To the Heart of America (The Voyage)

• 2002 Argentinië & Chili, het Europa van toen Argentina & Chile, the Europe of yesteryear

• 2003 De Witte Hemel (roman) The White Sky (novel)

• 2005 Van Bruinisse naar de Costa del Sol (scheepsjournaal) From Bruinisse to the Costa del Sol (Ship's Journal)

• 2005 Van Andalusië naar Anatolië (scheepsjournaal) From Andalusia to Anatolia (Ship's Journal)

• 2007 De Hellespont voorbij (scheepsjournaal) Beyond the Hellespont (Ship's Journal)

• 2008 Het andere Midden-Oosten (scheepsjournaal) The other Middle East (Ship's Journal)

• 2013 Comtoise-Morbier (4-language dictionary)

• 2013 Mayet Morbier Comtoise (Dutch version)

• 2014 Mayet Morbier Comtoise (English version)

• 2014 Mayet Morbier Comtoise (German version)

• 2015 Mayet Morbier Comtoise (French version)

• 2019 Montolieu, son histoire et ses horlogers Montolieu, its history and its clockmakers

• 2022 Een doos vol heugenis (kroniek) A box full of memories (chronicle)

• 2026 The White Sky (roman) Translation of De Witte Hemel (novel)
