= Ernest Thoen =

Dutch-American photographer

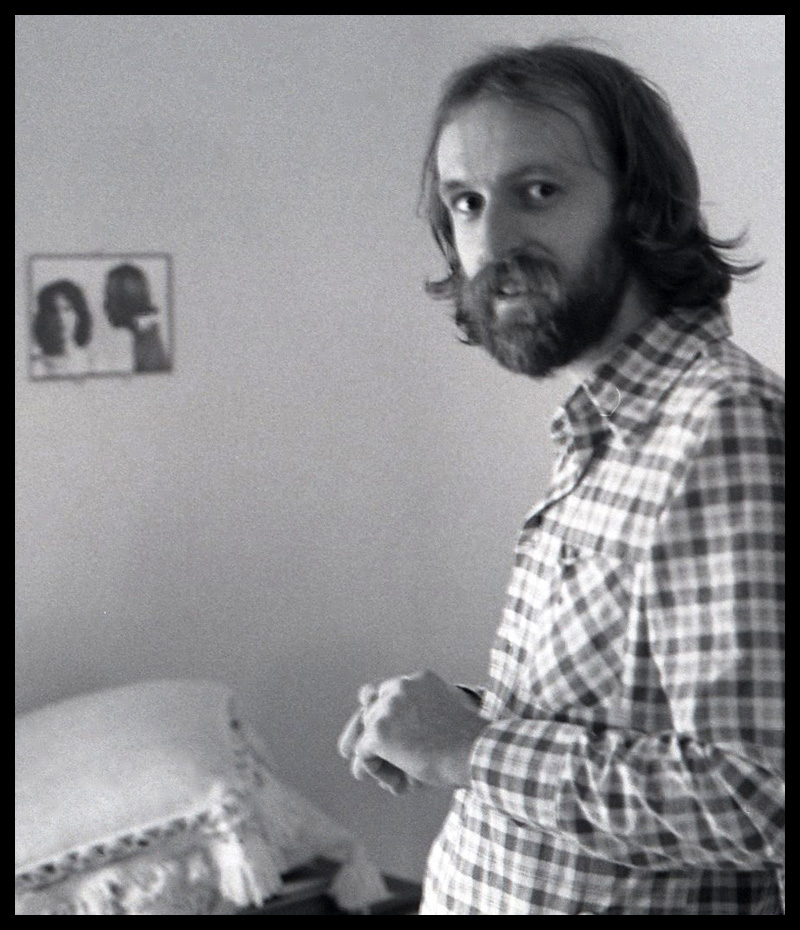
- Ernest Thoen in 1977
- Born: Ernest Johannes Thoen; June 10, 1946; The Hague, Netherlands
- Died: June 2, 2011 (aged 64); New York City, United States
- Known for: Photography

Ernest Johannes Thoen [pronounced "tune"] (June 10, 1946 – June 2, 2011) was a Dutch-American photographer. His best known photographs include black and white portraits in the documentary style, incorporating the immediate surroundings of his subjects in a relaxed and informal style.

Thoen's photographs can be found in the permanent collections of the High Museum of Art in Atlanta, and New Orleans Museum of Art.

== Background and early photography career ==
Ernest Johannes Thoen was born in The Hague, Netherlands just after the end of World War II to native Belgian father, Isidore Victor Thoen, and Dutch mother Aafje Marie van Berkel. As a child, Thoen's mother Aafje Marie performed as a pianist with her traveling entertainer father, Bercelini, and her mother Leoni, whose name the daughter used as her stage name. His father, Isidore Victor Thoen, was an industrialist and owner of a paint factory in the years following World War II. His grandfather was Johannes Cornelius van Berkel, known as Bercelini, a professional magician, writer, and performer. Thoen's uncle, Nico van Berkel, known as Niberco, was a Dutch traveling magician who performed on British radio.

In 1950, the Thoen family uprooted and moved to Bogotá, Colombia to start a paint manufacturing business. Due to the political situation at the time, the enterprise failed and the family fortune was lost.

In 1957, the family moved to Miami with the hope of a new start in United States. It was during this time that Thoen first became interested in photography. He began by using 35mm SLR cameras, and later also used 4x5 single lens reflexes. Self-taught, Ernest eventually set up his own dark room and printed many images, usually 11x14 black and white silver prints, but many of his earliest photographs were lost.

== Education and exhibitions ==
Ernest Thoen attended college in Miami, and graduated in Atlanta, where he received a Master of Visual Arts degree in Photography. He participated in a workshop with art photographer Duane Michals in Atlanta at the Nexus Gallery, 1979.

- Photographs of Ernest Thoen at the High Museum of Art, Atlanta, November 8 – December 31, 1980. 1. Artists in Georgia. 1 Photograph.
- Hudson River Museum, Yonkers, 1982. Two Person exhibit 2. 10 Photographs and at the Museum of the South, 1979.

== Death ==
Ernest Thoen died June 2, 2011, in New York City after being diagnosed with lymphoma.
