= Nancy van Overveldt =

Dutch painter

- Born: Nancy Wilhelmina Scheffer; February 2, 1930; The Hague
- Died: June 7, 2015 (aged 85); Lelystad
- Education: Royal Academy of Arts, The Hague
- Movement: Generación de la Ruptura

Nancy van Overveldt (February 2, 1930 – June 7, 2015), born Nancy Wilhelmina Scheffer, was a Dutch-Mexican artist. Van Overveldt worked with Mathías Goeritz, Pedro Friedeberg and Angela Gurría, among other modernistas solitarios from the Generación de la Ruptura.

== Life ==
=== Youth and education ===
Nancy Wilhelmina Scheffer was born in The Hague on February 2, 1930, as daughter of Henri Eduard Scheffer, lawyer, and Jacoba Maria van Overveldt. In 1947 she obtained a prize in a national drawing contest and in 1948 she was accepted in the Royal Academy of Art in the Hague. En 1950 she moved to Paris to study in the academy of André Lhote.

=== Mexico ===
==== Private life ====
In the train between The Hague and Paris, Van Overveldt met her future husband, Reinhardt Ruge, a Mexican of German descent. They moved to Mexico and had a daughter, Tiahoga Ruge. Van Overveldt obtained Mexican citizenship. After separating from Ruge, Van Overveldt married Valentín Saldaña with whom she had her second daughter, Alejandra Saldaña.

==== Artistic career ====
In Mexico Nancy used her mother's last name and continued her artistic career as Nancy van Overveldt. In the 1950s she had several exhibitions in the Galería Antonio Souza, a meeting place for artists of the Generación de la Ruptura. There she met Mathías Goeritz with whom she worked as an assistant for ten years. Van Overveldt was member of the Salón de la Plástica Mexicana.

In 1960 she had her first exhibition in New York. On January 7, 1966, opened Van Overveldt's solo exhibition in the Museo del Palacio de Bellas Artes. The October Gallery in London hosted a solo exhibition of Van Overveldt in 2005.

=== The Netherlands ===
In 1974 her second husband died and in 1976 Van Overveldt returned to The Netherlands. She lived first in Wassenaar and later in Lelystad and continued her artistic career. She became a member of artist organizations Kunstkring Wassenaar and Flevoland Artists Organization.

== Works ==
=== Solo exhibitions ===
- Gallery Antonio Souza, Mexico City, 1953, 1954, 1956, 1958, 1961
- Gallery Roland de Ainille, New York, 1960
- Museum of the Palacio de Bellas Artes, Mexico City, January 1966
- Salón de la Plástica Mexicana, Mexico City, 1976 and 2008
- October Gallery, London, 2005

=== Group exhibitions ===
- Goethe Institute, Mexico City, 1974. With Mathías Goeritz, Pedro Friedeberg, Diego Matthai and Naomi Siegmann
- Mexican Embassy in The Netherlands, The Hague, 2019.

=== Retrospective exhibitions ===
- Salón de la Plástica Mexicana, Mexico City, 2015. Tribute to Nancy van Overveldt
- Government Hall, Flevoland, Lelystad, 2016. Tribute to Nancy van Overveldt
- Pulchri Studio, The Hague, 2020
- Museo Morelense de Arte Contemporáneo Juan Soriano, Cuernavaca, 2021. Nancy van Overveldt: 70 years of artistic creation
