= Jowie Schulner =

- Born: 29 October 1985 (age 40); The Hague, Netherlands
- Genres: Electronic, dream pop, synthpop, classical, new-age, ambient
- Occupations: Composer, electronic musician, producer, remixer
- Instruments: Synthesizer, Piano, Keyboards
- Years active: 2008—present
- Label: Boombar Music
- Formerly of: Swartz & Schulner
- Website: www.jowieschulner.com

Jowie Schulner (born 29 October 1985) is a Dutch electronic composer, artist, producer and remixer. Jowie Schulner is known as one of pioneers of the 1980s inspired synth scene.

== Career ==
=== Swartz & Schulner ===
In 2008, Jowie Schulner began his career as part of a Dutch Tech Trance duo, Swartz & Schulner, by winning two remix contests for Hybrid Players and Brent Sadowick. Anthony Nardone's Looks Good (Swartz & Schulner Remix) that was played by UK's trance Legend Judge Jules on BBC Radio 1 as "Tried and Tested" track of the week (The "Looks Good" Remix by Swartz & Schulner has been played by Judge Jules at the Ministry Of Sound nightclub based in London) and Will Atkinson's Pacific Moment (Swartz & Schulner Remix) reached the Top 10 Trance / Tech Trance Charts at Trackitdown, Beatport and Junodownload. Since then, every release of Swartz & Schulner ended up in the top 10 downloads. The duo received several mentions, such as MixMag. They have produced music for Musical Madness (Marcel Woods' record label), CGI records, Virus Audio, Riot Recordings, Crossing Over Recordings, Benefactor, Trance Allstars, Keep On Techno records, Digitally Infected, Tech Art records. They have also made remixes for Dart Rayne, Iris Deejay, Jason Grey, Joe-E, Louk and Matias Moor as well as produced a radio show called "Wicked Waves" at Digitally Imported.

=== Solo career ===
In 2010, the same year that Jowie Schulner began his solo career, he also launched two separate record labels - Unitec Recordings and Boombar Music. In 2011, Jowie Schulner remixed Futurecop!'s single "Starworshipper", which was released on a German based record label Kiez Beats. Jowie also produces a radio show called "Boombar Music Club". His carefully thought out selection of tracks reflects his unique style in a blend of Progressive, Techno, House, Electronica, Trance, and everything in between. From May 2012 until October 2012, "Boombar Music Club" aired on Eclectic Radio and, in April 2013, he continued his radio show at Digitally Imported Progressive, right after John Digweed's radio show.

=== Musical style ===
Jowie Schulner's distinctive sound is a mixture of Electronic, Synthpop, and classical, combining synthesizers and dance beats with orchestral instruments and compositions. Jowie Schulner's music has been compared to Jean Michel Jarre and Vangelis.

== Discography ==
=== Studio albums ===
- Emotronic Diary (2013) - [Mixcloud - Stream only]

=== EPs ===
- Two Hearts (2012)
- From Here To Eternity (2012)
- Celebration Of Life (2012)
- Emotronic Diary (limited cassette version released on Werkstatt Recordings) (2014)

=== Remakes ===
- Jowie Schulner - Casino Night (Sonic the Hedgehog) (2012)
- Jowie Schulner - Overlord a.k.a. Supremacy (2012)

=== Compilations ===
- A New Day - Synthwave, Vol 1 - Kiez Beats (2012)

=== Collaborations ===
- Alpha Boy feat. Jowie Schulner - Lost In Space (2012)

=== Remixes ===
- Embryonik - Space Cadet (Jowie Schulner Remix) (2011)
- Futurecop! - Starworshipper Feat STARRSET (Jowie Schulner Remix) (2012)
- Silenx - Kaleidoscope (Jowie Schulner Remix) (2011)
