= Wilhelmina van Sluyters =

Dutch actress (1852–1926)

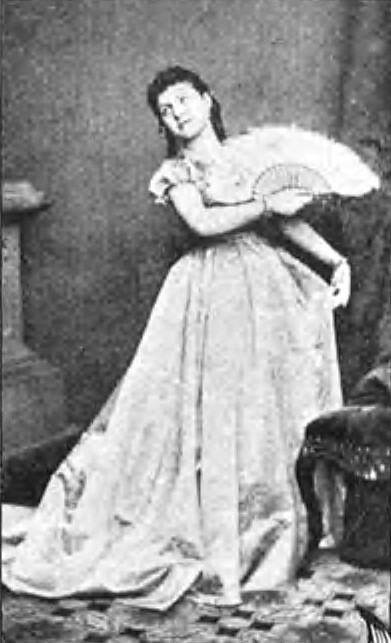
- Born: Wilhelmina Geertruida Henriette van Sluyters; 10 March 1852; The Hague, Netherlands
- Died: 23 November 1926 (aged 74); The Hague, Netherlands
- Occupation: actress
- Spouse: Johannes Leonardus Warnas
- Parent(s): Jacobus Bernardus van Sluyters (father); Henriëtte Picéni (mother)

Wilhelmina Geertruida Henriette van Sluyters (10 March 1852 – 23 November 1926), also known as Mina van Sluyters or Mina van Sluijters, was a Dutch stage actress known for her association with the Salon des Variétés in Amsterdam.

== Biography ==
Van Sluyters was born in The Hague on 10 March 1852 to Jacobus Bernardus van Sluyters and Henriëtte Antonia Nanette Picéni, who were both actors.

She was associated with the Salon des Variétés in Nes, Amsterdam between 1869 and 1876. At the salon, she was the successor of the actress Jeanette Corijn-Heilbron.

On 16 June 1876, van Sluyters married Johannes Leonardus Warnas, son of Johannes Josephus Warnas and Elisabeth Geertruida de Vos. Her husband was an apothecary for the Dutch military in the Dutch East Indies. Upon her marriage, she moved to the East Indies with her husband.

She continued acting in the 1880s and 1890s, performing in Lion van Lier and playing the role of Arend in Jacob van Lennep's Een Amsterdamse Jongen.

Van Sluyters died on 23 November 1926 in The Hague.
