= Pieter Melvill van Carnbee (geographer) =

Baron Pieter Melvill van Carnbee or Peter Melvill de Carnbee (20 May 1816, in The Hague – 24 October 1856, in Batavia) was a Dutch geographer. He served in the Dutch Navy from 1835 until his death in 1856. In his early career, he was known for his cartography and hydrography of the Dutch East Indies. In 1842, he completed a map of Java over five sheets. This was followed a few years later by a chart of the waters between Sumatra and Borneo, which was published in two parts in 1845 and in 1846. For three years, he worked on the Monitor of the Indies, a series of scientific papers on the Netherlands' foreign possessions. At the time of his death, he had completed 25 sheets of a general atlas of the Dutch Indies. The sixty-sheet atlas was later completed by Willem Frederik Versteeg in 1862.

== Early life and education ==
Pieter Melvill van Carnbee was born on 20 May 1816 in The Hague into an old Scottish family, possibly of Hungarian descent. His grandfather, Pieter Melvill van Carnbee (1743–1810), had been admiral. Carnbee studied at the Royal Naval Institute at Medemblik, North Holland where he acquired an interest in hydrography and cartography.

== Career ==
In 1835, Melvill van Carnbee served as a surveyor on his first voyage to the Dutch Indies. He was promoted from midshipman to second lieutenant in 1838. In 1839, he was attached to the hydrographical bureau at Batavia, the Surveying Office of East Indian Hydrography. In 1842, using documents of the old East India Company, he completed a map of Java, with sailing directions, over five sheets. He would remain in the East Indies until 1845, where he collected materials for a chart of the waters between Sumatra and Borneo. The chart was published in two parts, with one sheet being published in 1845 and the other in 1846.

On his return to the Netherlands, he was attached to the naval department to study the history of the hydrography of the Dutch East Indies. With Philip Franz von Siebold, he undertook the publication of the Moniteur des Indes (Monitor of the Indies), a series of scientific papers on the Netherlands' foreign possessions, over the course of three years.

In 1850, he returned to India as first lieutenant and adjutant to Vice-Admiral van den Bosch (nl) . There, he became the Secretary of the East Indian Hydrographical Office. After van den Bosch's premature death in 1851, Melvill van Carnbee was again appointed keeper of the charts at Batavia. In 1853, he obtained an exemption from active naval service in order to work on a general atlas of the Dutch Indies. But, in 1856, he fell victim to the harsh climate and died at Batavia in October 1856. He was 39.

At the time of his death, 25 sheets of the atlas had been completed. However, it wasn't until 1862 that the entire sixty-sheet atlas was completed by Lt. Col. Willem F. Versteeg.

== Awards ==
In 1843, Melvill van Carnbee received an award of the Order of the Netherlands Lion and, in 1849, he was awarded the French Légion d'Honneur.

== Works ==
This is an incomplete list of the works of Pieter Melvill van Carnbee (please help to complete it):

- Melvill de Carnbee, Pieter, and H. D. A. Smits. 1853. "The Seaman's Guide round Java, to the islands East of Java and through the Straits of Banca and Gaspar.". 3rd ed. London: Hydrographic Office.
- Siebold, Philipp Franz von, and Pieter Melvill de Carnbee. 1847. Le Moniteur des Indes orientales et occidentales: Recueil de mémoires et de notices scientifiques et industriels concernant les possessions néerlandaises d’Asie et d’Amérique. (fr) La Haye: Belinfante Frères; Batavia: Bureau de Moniteur, à l’Imprimerie de l’État.

== Bibliography ==
- Chisholm, Hugh, ed. (1911). "Melvill van Carnbee, Pieter" . Encyclopædia Britannica. Vol. 18 (11th ed.). Cambridge University Press. p. 103.

Dutch nobility
Preceded by Isaäc August Melvill van Carnbee	Baron Melvill van Carnbee; 1845–1856	Succeeded by James John Melvill van Carnbee
