= Marinus Snoeren =

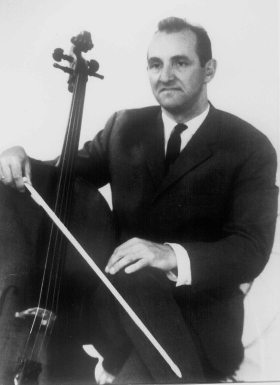

Background information
- Born: Marinus Arnoldus Johannes Snoeren; October 16, 1919; The Hague, Netherlands
- Died: July 11, 1982 (aged 62) Voorburg, Netherlands
- Genre: Classical
- Occupations: Cellist, pedagogue
- Formerly of: Residentie Orchestra

Marinus Arnoldus Johannes Snoeren (October 16, 1919 – July 11, 1982) was a Dutch cellist who was called the "aristocrat of cellists," on account of his elegant musicianship and majestic sound. He was born in The Hague, the son of Marinus Franciscus Snoeren.

As a pedagogue he was most noticeable for his student Anner Bylsma. Marinus was a teacher at the Leidsche Muziek School in Leiden. He made his first tour of the United States in 1963 and played to great acclaim in the orchestra undertaking several major tours which included cities such as New York City, Boston, Chicago, Vienna, Munich and Berlin. He has performed under great conductors including Leonard Bernstein, Pierre Boulez, Hans Knappertsbusch. Later he was the principal cellist for six years in the Residentie Orchestra in The Hague. He played the various cello concertos under Jean Martinon. His eldest son became a conductor/composer performing under the name of Rien Snoeren.

== Discography ==
- Only known recordings are Suites of Bach held in the family records.
