= Mauritz de Haas =

American painter

Maurits Frederik Hendrik de Haas
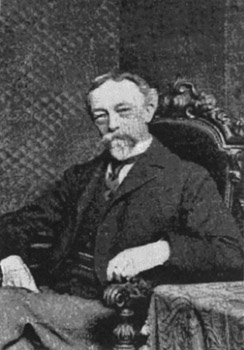
- Born: December 12, 1832; Rotterdam, Netherlands
- Died: November 23, 1895 (aged 62); New York City, US
- Known for: Painting
- Movement: Realism

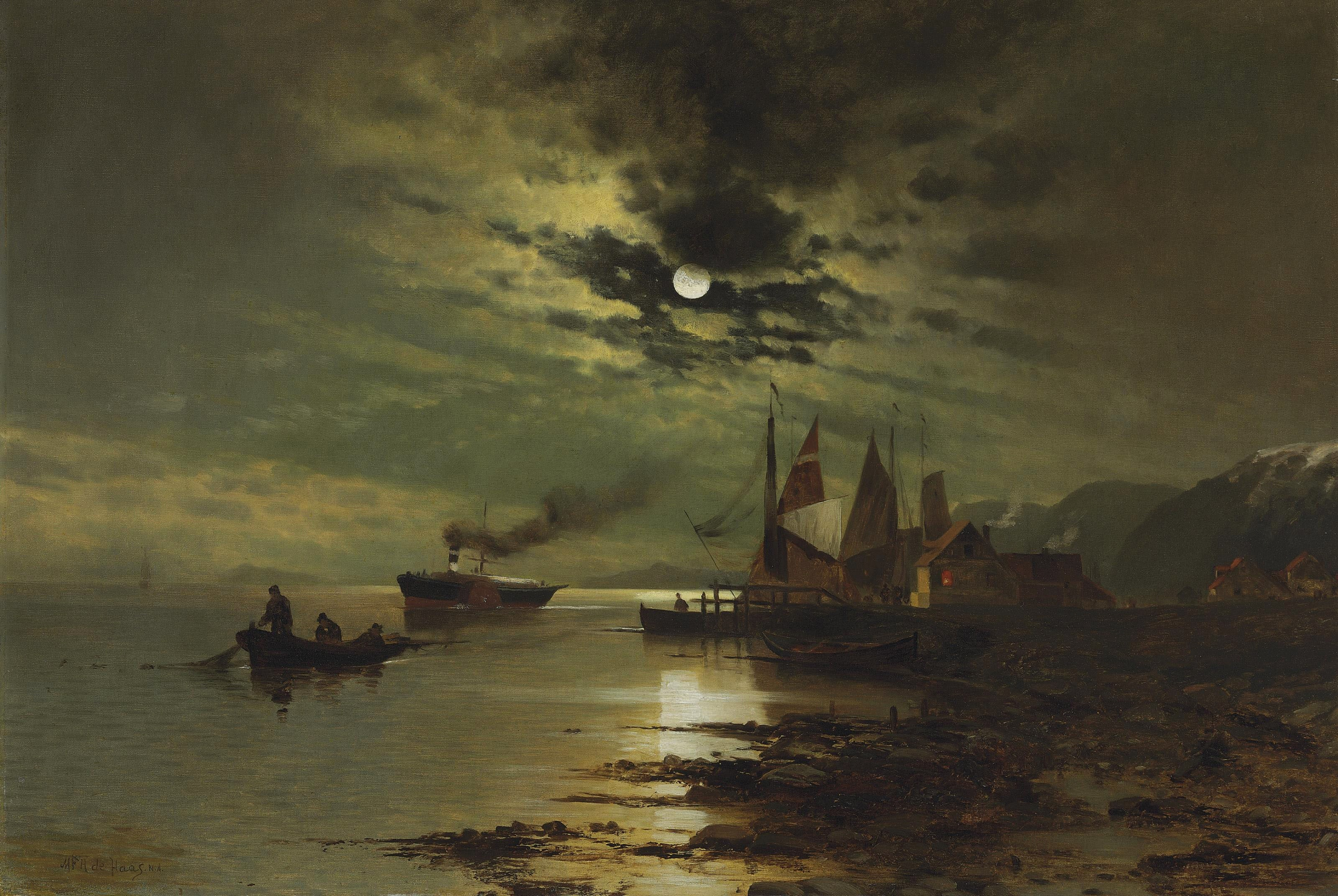
Hudson River Under Moonlight

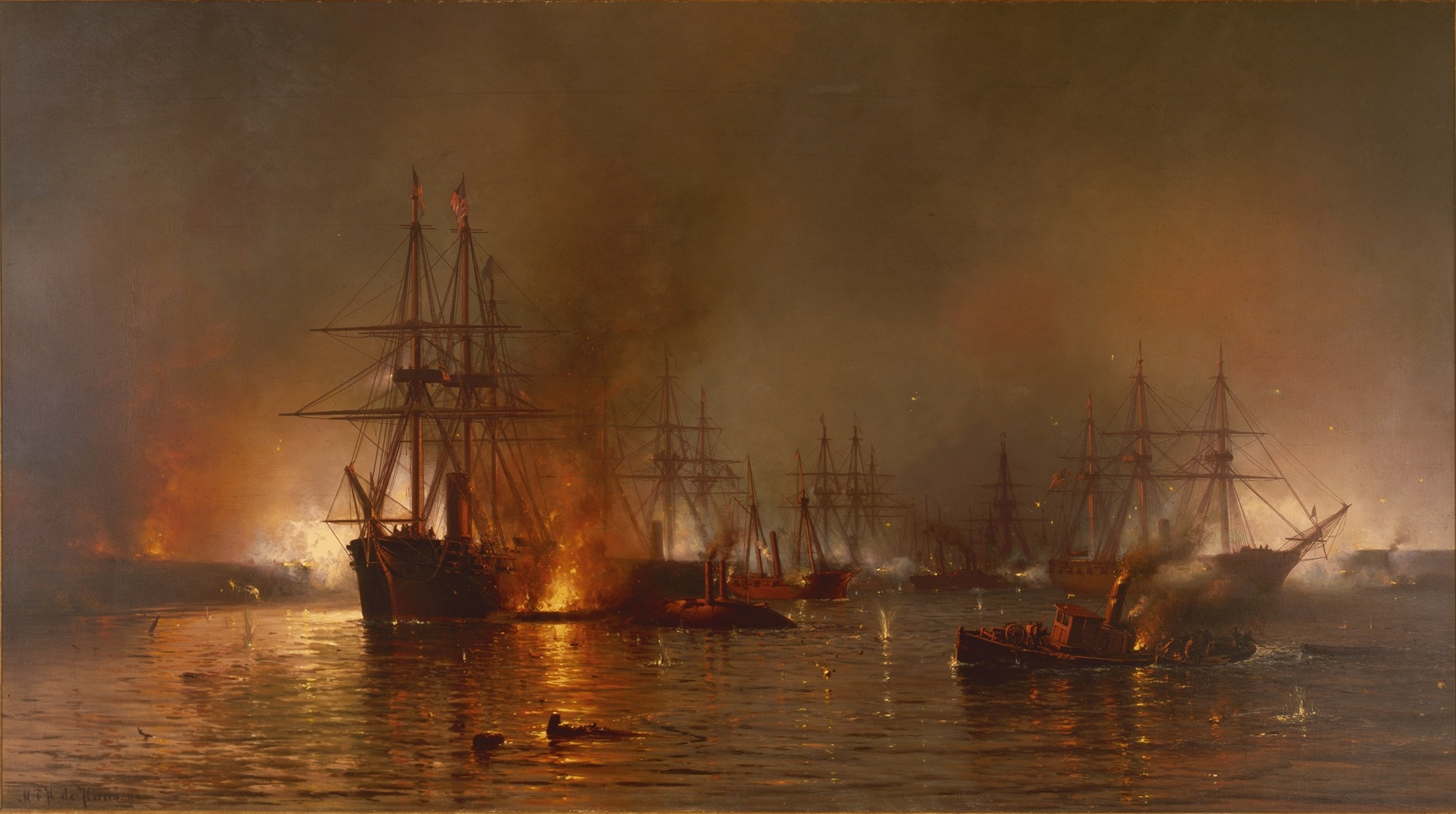
Farragut's Fleet passing the Forts below New Orleans

Maurits Frederik Hendrik de Haas (December 12, 1832 – November 23, 1895) was a Dutch-American marine painter. His name has been written as Mauritz Frederik de Haas, Maurice F. H. de Haas, Maurice Frederic Henri de Haas, Mauritz Frederick Hendrick De Haas, "Maurice Frederick Hendrick de Haas", as well as various other variations.

== Biography ==
De Haas was born in Rotterdam, Netherlands. He studied art at the Rotterdam Academy and at The Hague, under Johannes Bosboom and Louis Meyer, and in 1851-1852 in London, following the English watercolourists of the day. In 1857 he received an artist's commission in the Dutch Navy, but in 1859, under the patronage of August Belmont, who had recently been minister of the United States at The Hague, he resigned and moved to New York City.

He became an associate of the National Academy in 1863 and an academician in 1867, and exhibited annually in the academy, and in 1866 he was one of the founders of the American Society of Painters in Water Colors. He died in New York City.

His Farragut Passing the Forts at the Battle of New Orleans and The Rapids above Niagara, which were exhibited at the Paris Exposition of 1878, were his best known but not his most typical works, for his favorite subjects were storm and wreck, wind and heavy surf, and less often moonlight on the coasts of Holland, of Jersey, of New England, Long Island, the English Channel and of Grand Manan island in the Bay of Fundy.

His brother Willem Frederik de Haas (1830–1880) was also a marine painter.

== Works ==
- Rocky Coast (unknown)
- Sunset off the Needles, 1870; St. Johnsbury Athenaeum, St. Johnsbury, Vermont
- Afternoon on Saco Bay, Coast of Maine, 1874
- Hudson River Under Moonlight, 1876
- Fishing Boats at Anchor, 1886

== Notable students ==
- Archibald Cary Smith
