= Kaemmerer =

Kaemmerer is a surname. Notable people with the surname include:

- Emmy Kaemmerer (born 1890), German politician
- Frederik Hendrik Kaemmerer (1839–1902), Dutch painter
- Georg Heinrich Kaemmerer (1824–1875), German banker and politician

== See also ==
- Kammerer
