= Salomon Verveer =

Dutch painter

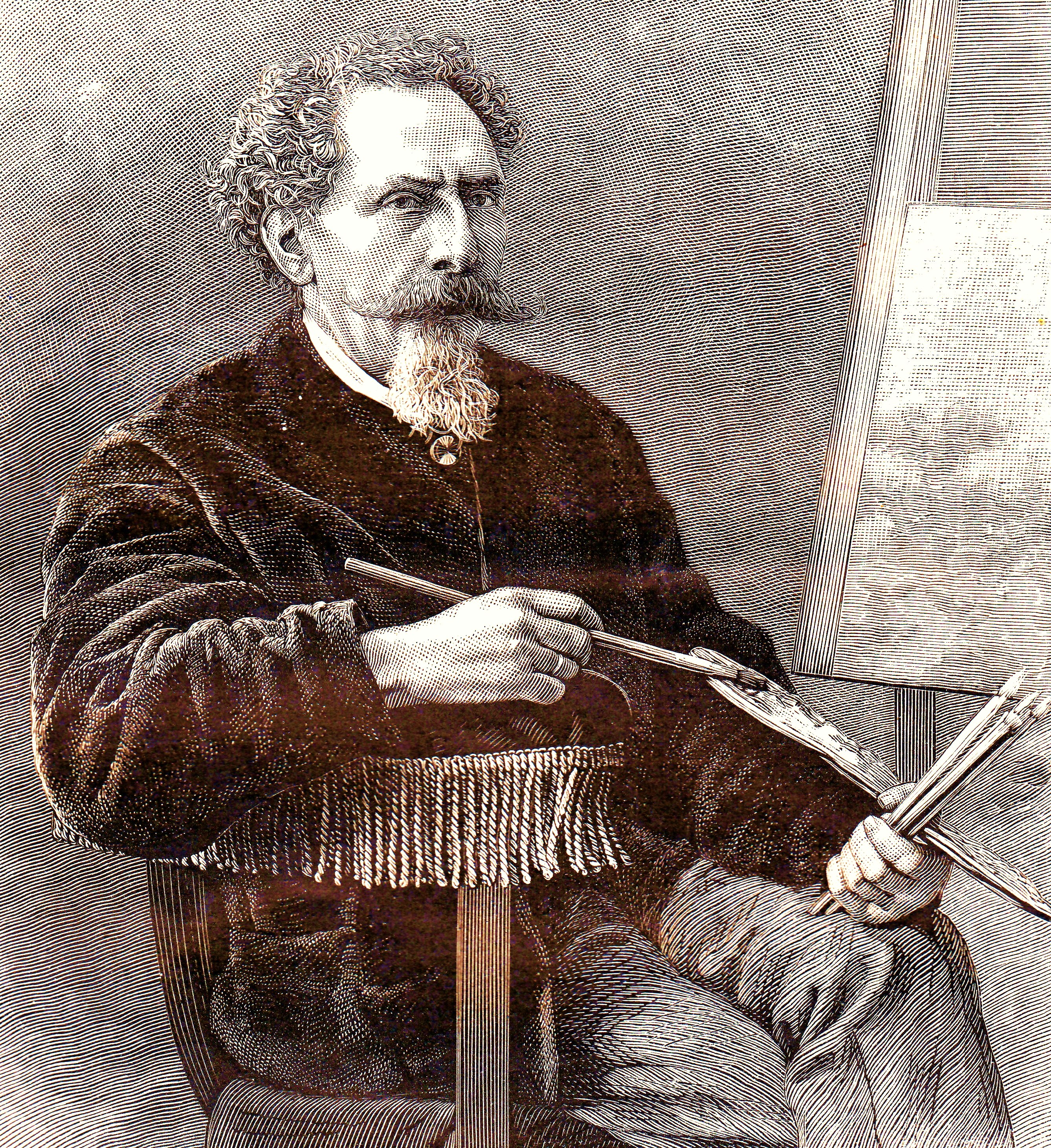
Salomon Verveer.

Salomon Leonardus Verveer (30 November 1813 – 5 January 1876) was a Dutch marinist and landscape painter. He was one of the most versatile and successful artists at the time of the Dutch romance, both at home and abroad. His sepia gouache and drawings are much appreciated. He is buried at the old Scheveningseweg Jewish cemetery in The Hague. His tomb, a large sarcophagus resting on a catafalque, is one of the most striking monuments in this historic cemetery.

== Biography ==
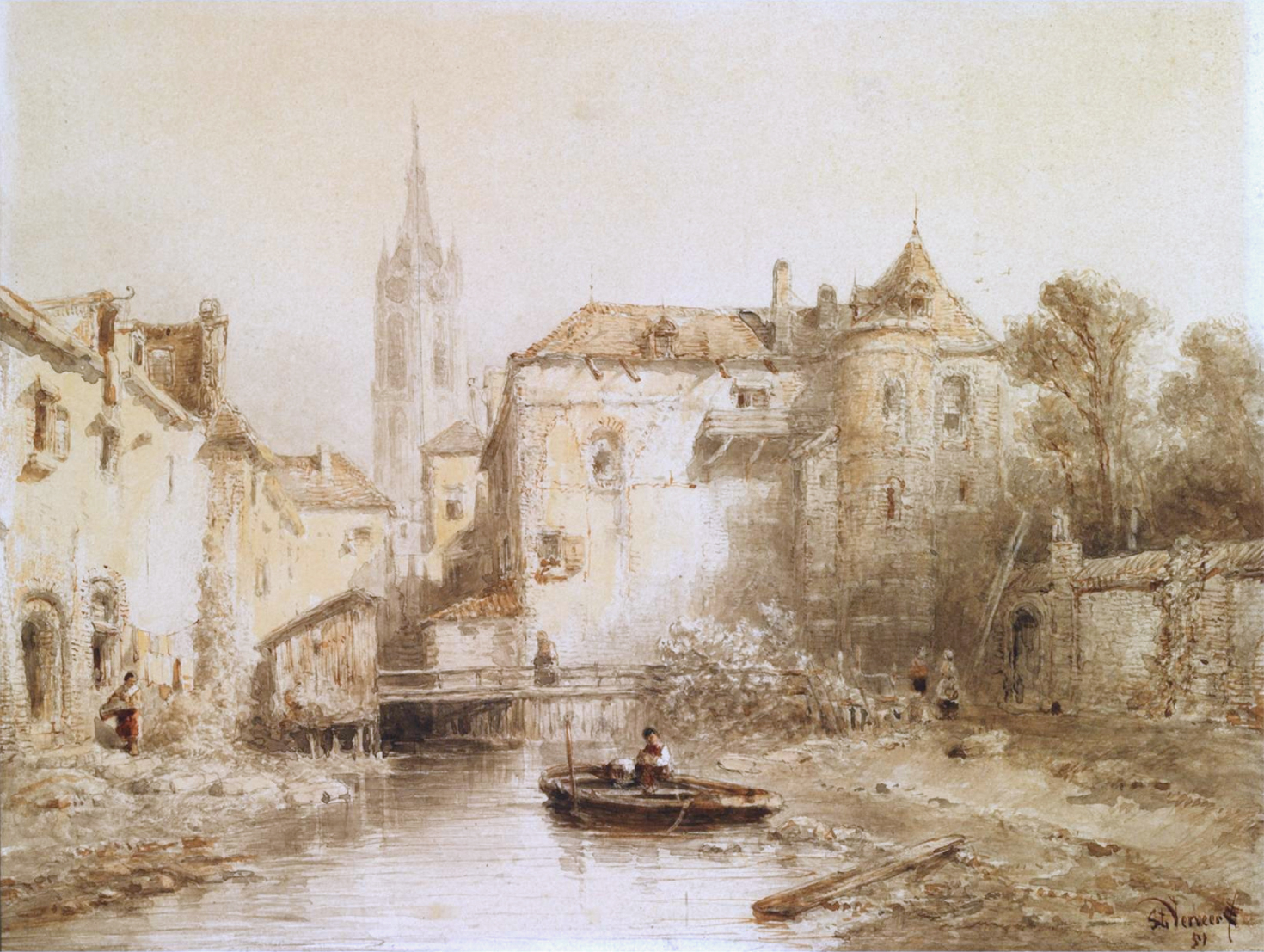
1852 watercolour over pencil on paper entitled: Townview with bell tower in the background

Verveer was a prominent Jewish-Hague painter. He was born in The Hague and trained as a painter by Bartholomeus Johannes van Hove. He worked with Jan Hendrik Weissenbruch and taught Frederik Hendrik Kaemmerer. He initially painted city and harbor scenes, river landscapes and village scenes. Later, he began painting dunes and Jewish neighborhoods, besides experimenting with charcoal.

He travelled through the Rhine provinces and France, especially Normandy, where he had many possibilities to paint city, village and sea views. In 1836 he was awarded a double silver medal by the Felix Meritis Society, and again at the Brussels Exhibition of 1842 where he received a gold-plated silver medal. At the Brussels Salon of 1845 two paintings were submitted and sold to the Belgian Minister of State, Sylvain Van de Weyer (Leaving for the Market) and the British ambassador George Hamilton Seymour (A vision of Dordrech).

In 1851, Verveer received the Order of Leopold, awarded to him personally by King Leopold I. At the Paris World Exhibition of 1855, Emperor Napoleon III bought two paintings submitted by Verveer. He was appointed Officer of the Order of the Oak Crown by King William III of the Netherlands on his 25th anniversary in May 1874, and in 1863 knight of the Order of the Netherlands Lion.

== Notes ==
=== Sources ===
- C. Kramm. (1861) De levens en werken der Hollandsche en Vlaamsche kunstschilders, beeldhouwers, graveurs en bouwmeesters, van den vroegsten tot op onzen tijd. Vol. 5–6. Page 1742.
- J. Gram. (1880) Salomon Leonardus Verveer. Eigen Haard. Pages 215–216.
