= William Frederick de Haas =

Dutch-born American painter

Willem Frederik de Haas (15 June 1830, Rotterdam – 16 Jul 1880, Faial Island, Azores) was a Dutch-born American painter.

He studied at the Art Academy of his native city, and at The Hague under Johannes Bosboom. He went in 1859 to New York City, where he became known as a painter of coast scenery. The following are some of his best works:

- Sunrise on the Susquehanna. 1867.
- Fishing Boats off Mount Desert. 1874.
- Midsummer Noon, Biddeford Beach, Coast of Maine. 1875.
- Narragansett Pier. 1877.
- Echo Lake, New Hampshire. 1877
