= Bartholomeus van Hove =

Dutch painter

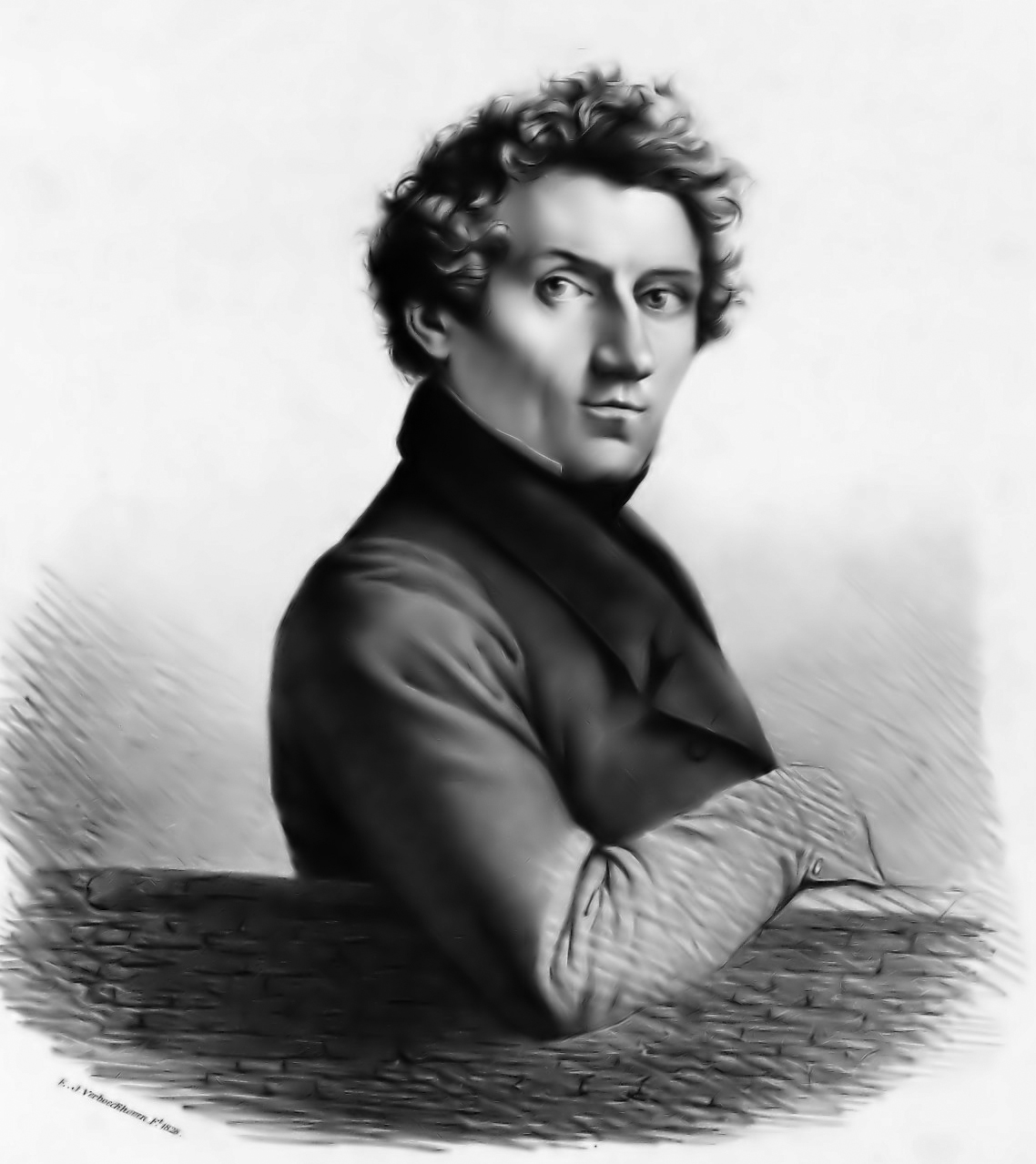
Bartholomeus van Hove (1828), after a painting by Eugène Joseph Verboeckhoven.

Bartholomeus Johannes van Hove (October 28, 1790 in The Hague – November 8, 1880 in The Hague) was a Dutch painter and the father of Hubertus van Hove. He played an important role in the development of 19th-century painting by his many disciples. He was able to teach his skills to a large group of artists, of whom especially Johannes Bosboom and Jan Hendrik Weissenbruch would rise to great heights.

== Biography ==
Van Hove was a pupil of his father, Hubertus van Hove the Elder and the theater painter JHAA Breckenheijmer, and was appointed headmaster in 1820 at the Hague Academy Teeken. In that capacity, he became the teacher of Carel Jacobus Behr, Petrus Augustus Beretta, Pieter Gerardus Bernhard, Johannes Bosboom, Cornelis de Cocq, Johannes Josephus Destree, Lambertus Hardenberg, his son Huib van Hove, Johannes van Hove, Herman Gijsbert Keppel Hesselink, Everhardus Koster, Charles Leickert, Maurits Leon, Ferdinand Carl Sierich, Johannes Anthonie Balthasar Stroebel, Willem Troost, Petrus Gerardus Vertin, Salomon Verveer, Lodewijk Anthony Vintcent, Hendricus Stephanus Johannes van Weerden, Jan Hendrik Weissenbruch, Cornelis Westerbeek, and Salomon van Witsen.

In 1823, he was commissioned by the War Department to illustrate the variety of Dutch army uniforms in a series of pen drawings. Van Hove was also a decorative artist, and in 1829 succeeded his teacher JHAA Breckenheijmer as a stage painter at the Hague Theatre.

In the painting world of The Hague, he was a public figure. In 1847, he became one of the founders of the Pulchri Studio. He also became the first president of this group, a position he held until 1851. He was also a member of the Amsterdam-based Arti et Amicitiae, of which he became honorary chairman in 1874.

== Style ==
Except for stage scenery, Van Hove painted mostly cityscapes and church interiors in a romantic style. His early works are characterized by a fine, detailed painting style, which strongly contrasts with the broad, colorful stage sets. His cityscapes and church interiors were often decorated with figures, sometimes done by his son Huib. His later cityscapes are looser and smoother in tone with a tailored gray coloration.

== Gallery ==
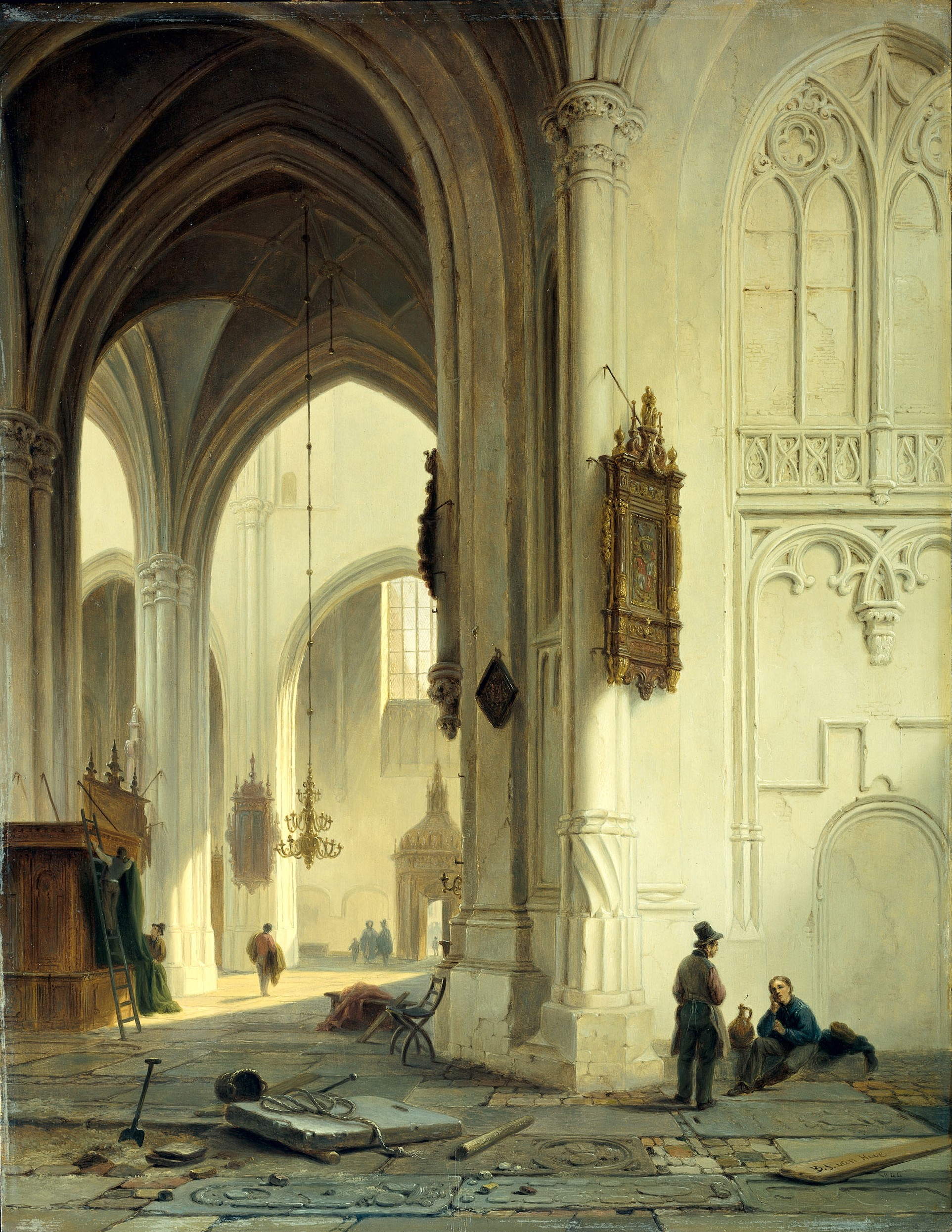
Church Interior (1844).
Oil on panel.

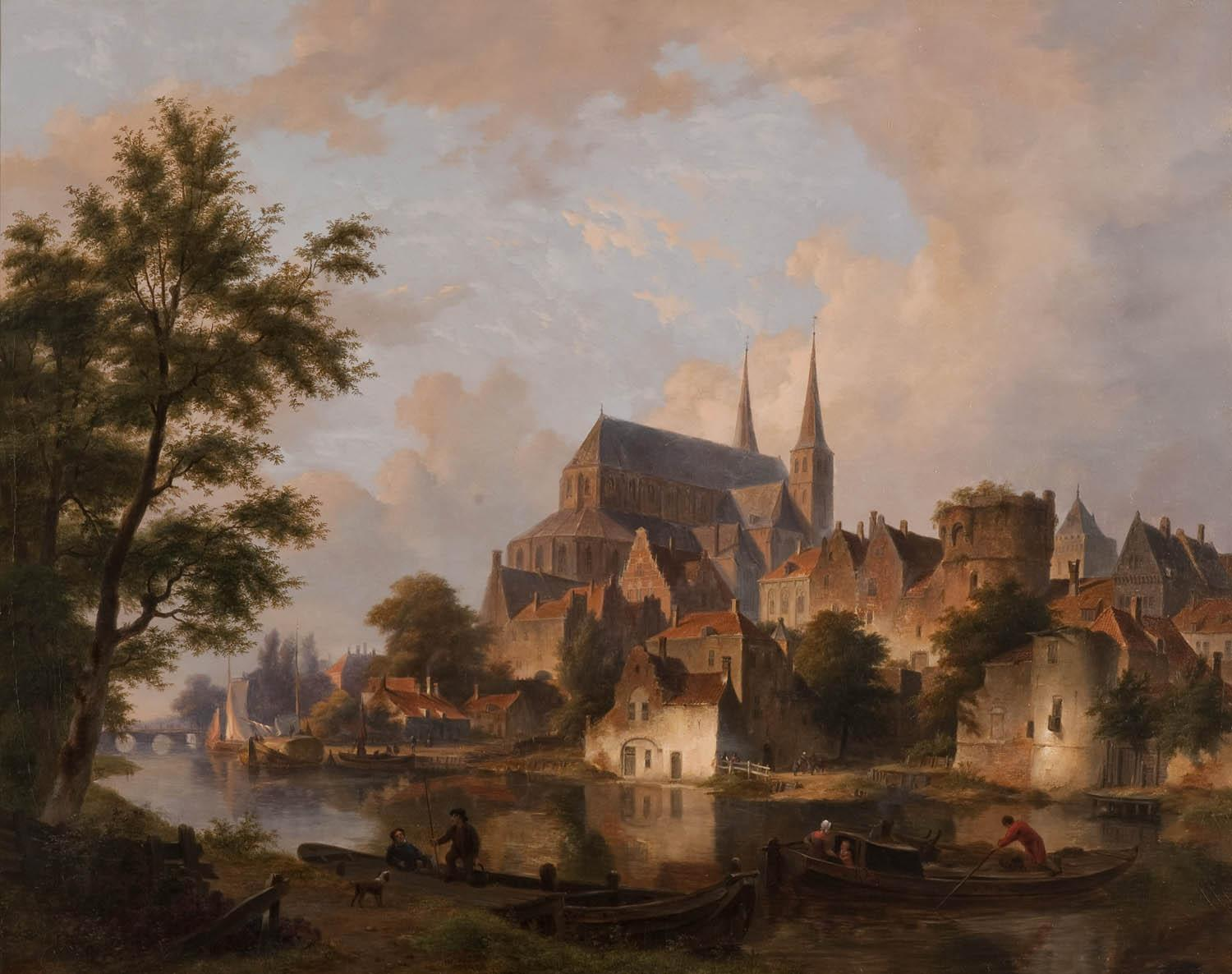
Capriccio Cityscape, Elements of Deventer

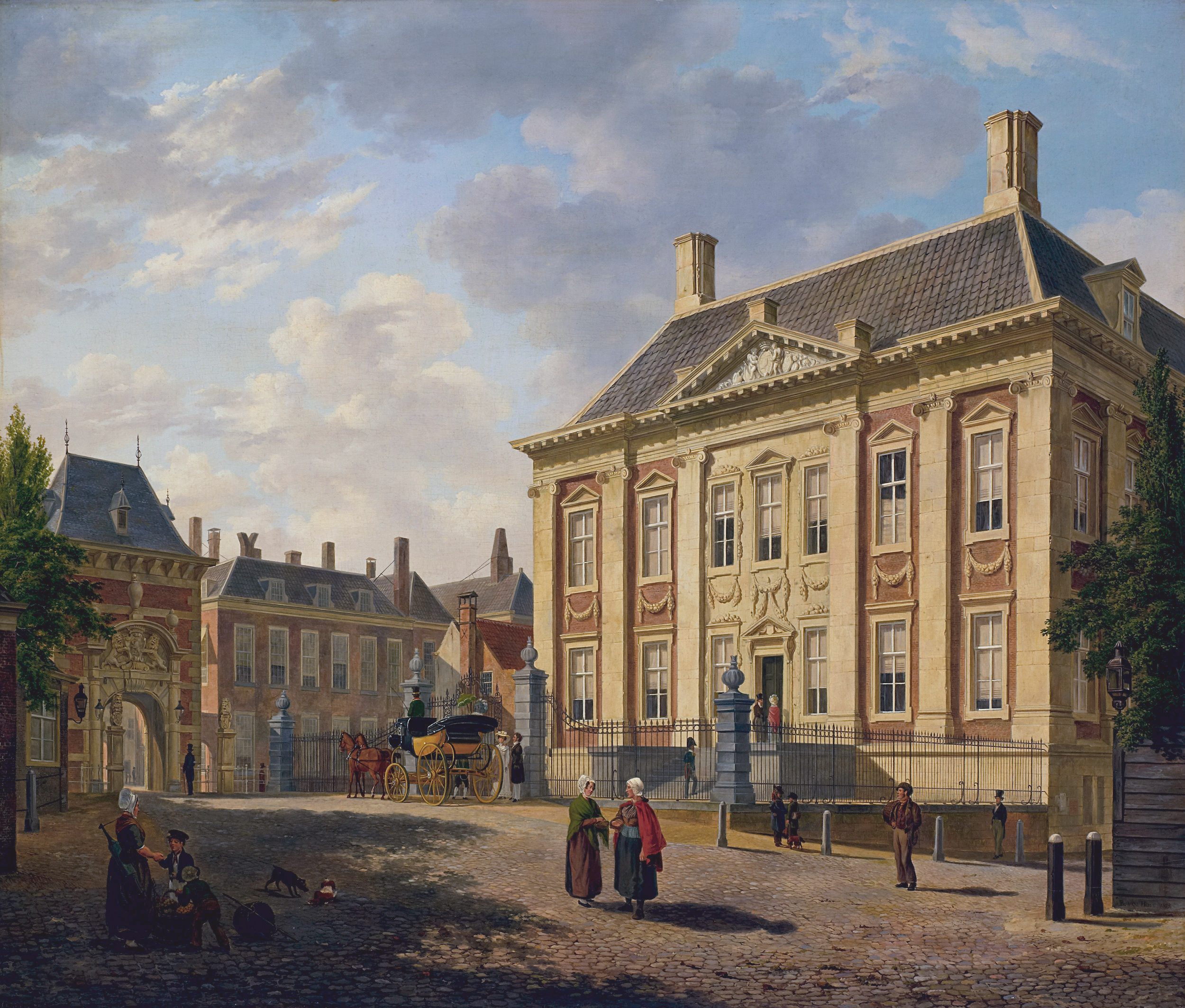
The Mauritshuis in The Hague (1825)

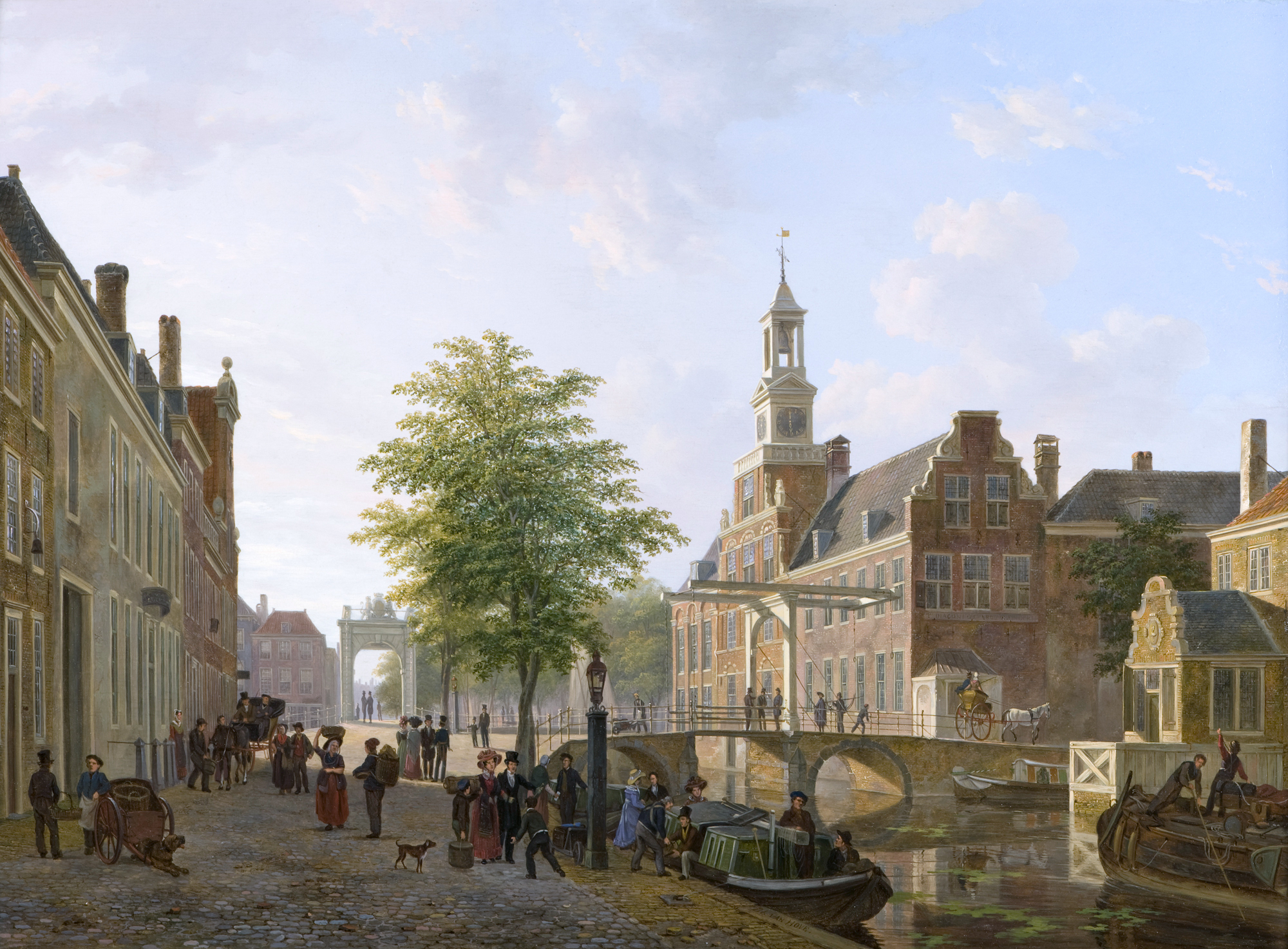
View of the Old Women and Children's Hospital in The Hague (1830)

== Bibliography ==
- Hove, Bartholomeus Johannes van Rijksbureau voor Kunsthistorische Documentatie
- M.B.W. Broekema, Hove, Bartholomeus Joannes van (1790-1880), in Biografisch Woordenboek van Nederland (13–03–2008)
