= Johannes Joseph Destrée =

Belgian landscape artist

Johannes Josephus Destrée
- Born: Johannes Josephus Destrée; 27 March 1827; Laeken, Belgium
- Died: 17 March 1888 (aged 60); The Hague, Netherlands
- Occupation: Painter

Johannes Josephus Destrée (27 March 1827 in Laeken - 17 March 1888 in The Hague) was a Belgian landscape artist.

== Biography ==
According to the RKD he was a pupil of Bartholomeus Johannes van Hove and Andreas Schelfhout who later joined the Pulchri studio. He travelled to Germany and worked in Oosterbeek, near Arnhem.

Selected work

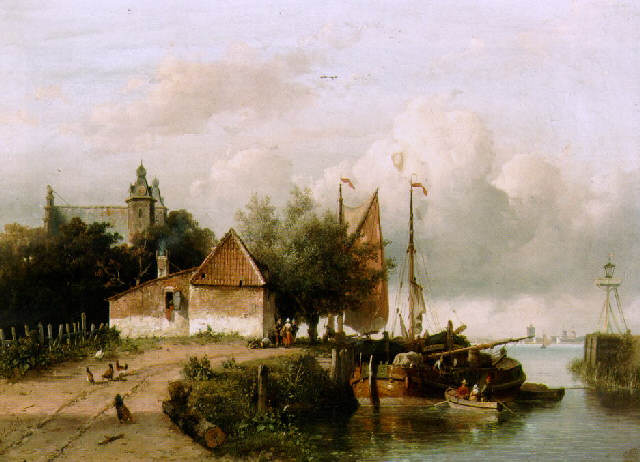
A ship moored near a Dutch town

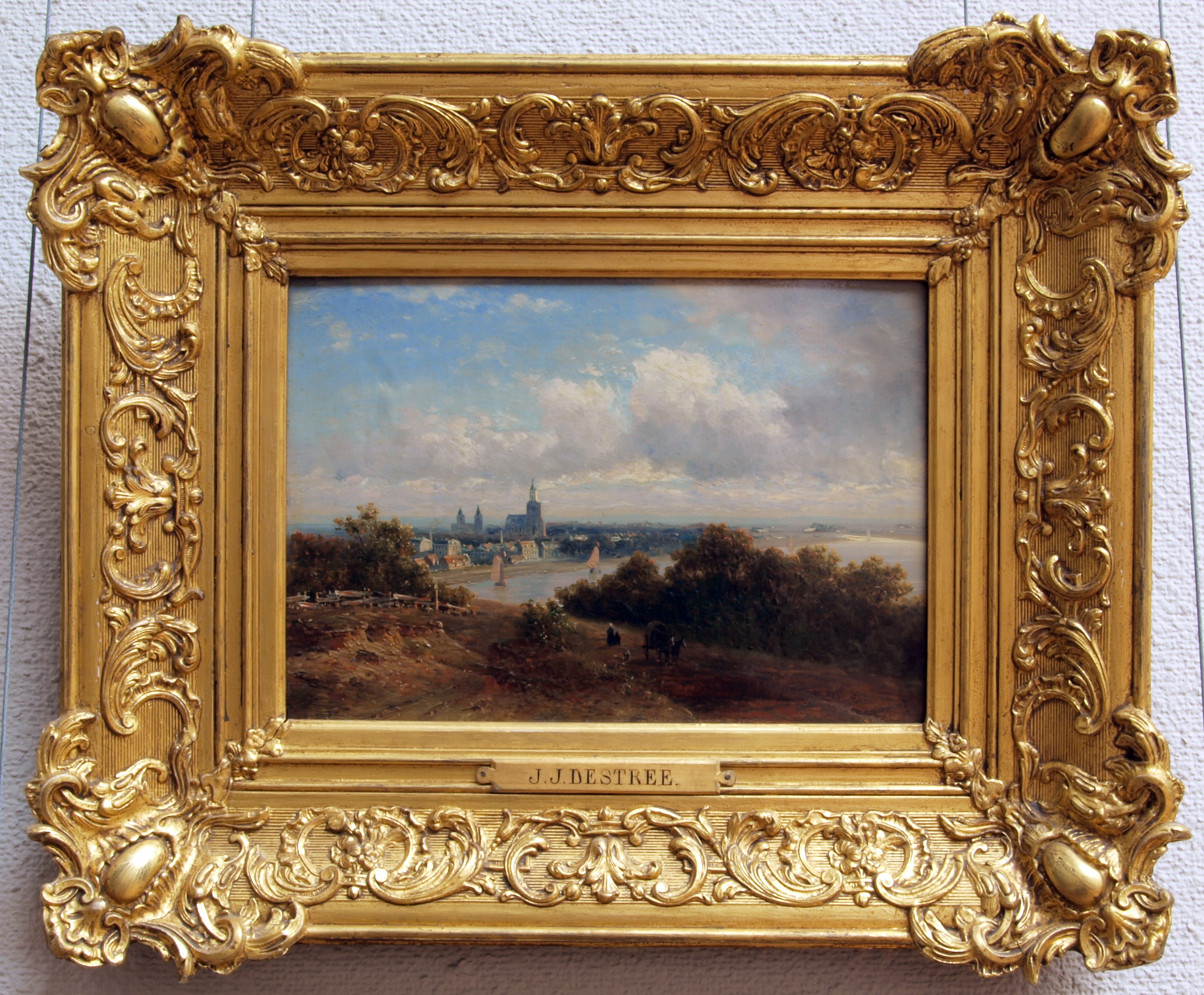
A view of Arnhem, collection Teylers Museum
