= Hubertus van Hove =

Dutch painter

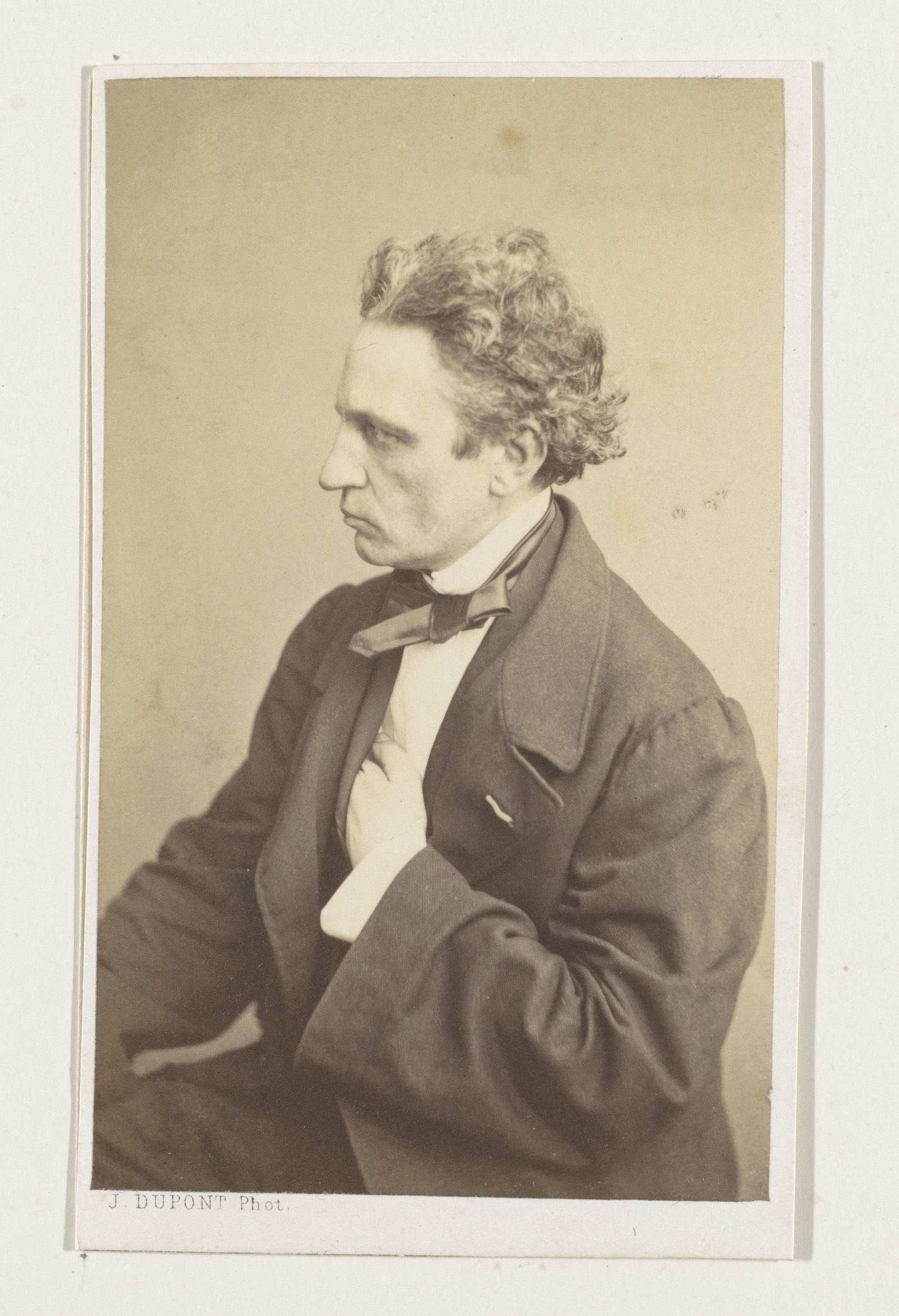
Hubertus van Hove (Huib van Hove Bz)

Hubertus (Huib) van Hove (13 May 1814, in The Hague – 14 November 1865? Antwerp) was a Dutch painter, the son of Bartholomeus van Hove (1790–1880) and a teacher of some artists who became members of the Hague School.

Hubertus or Huib van Hove was taught painting not only by his father, but also by Hendrik van de Sande Bakhuyzen. In his father's studio, he worked with Johannes Bosboom and together they worked on the pieces of scenery that Bartholomeus van Hove created for the Royal Theatre in The Hague.

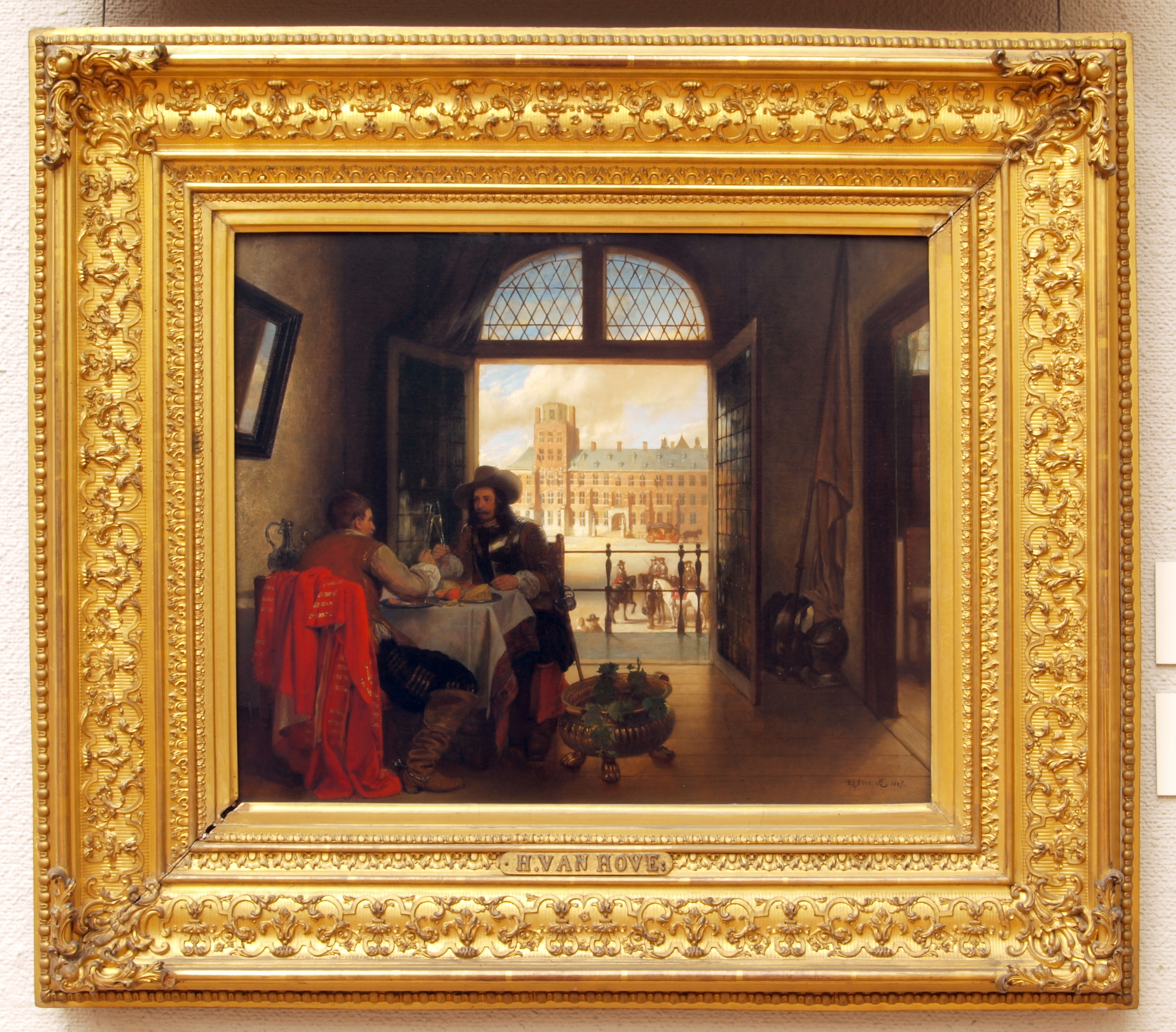
The Farewell, 1847, collection Teylers Museum

Hubertus started as a landscape painter, but his best work was not in that style. His love of color and bright light was best displayed in his doorkijkjes, or domestic vistas, in the style of Pieter de Hooch. These were views of outdoor light seen through an interior, a room or kitchen situated between the street door and an inner yard. Teyler's Museum possesses an excellent specimen in The Knitter, a picture which is of a lively composition and shows an inclination for a stronger and fresher coloring than prevailed in Van Hove's day.

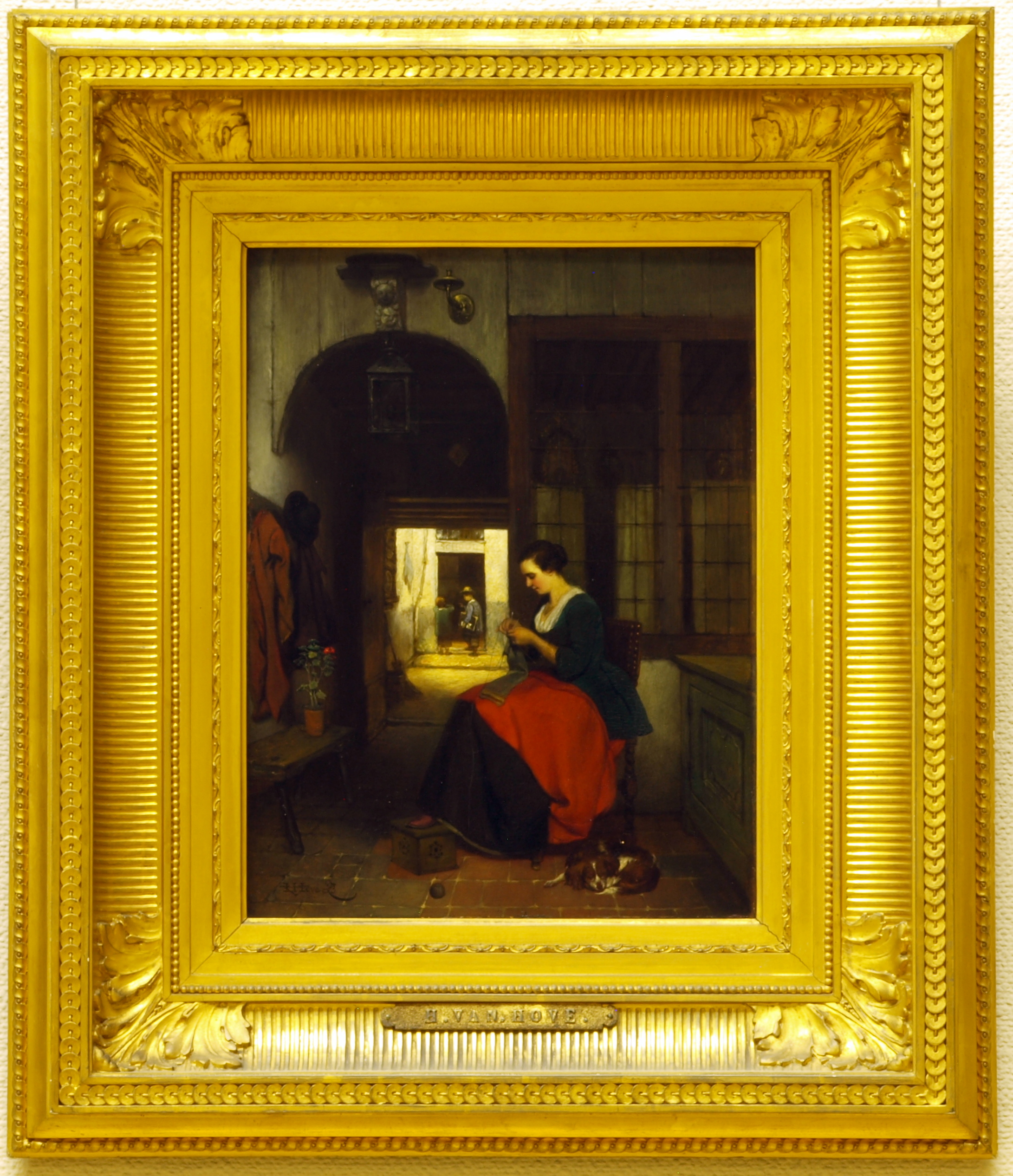
The Knitter; Teylers

Among his pupils were Jacob Maris, Christoffel Bisschop, Johannes Anthonie Balthasar Stroebel, Maurits Leon (1838–1865) and Hendricus Johannes Scheeres (1823–1864), who continued his master's teaching in his Armourer and Linen-shop and who enjoyed the appreciation of his brother artists.

== Sources ==
- Marius, Gerharda Hermina, Dutch Painters of the 19th Century, The Antique Collectors' Club, Woodbridge, Suffolk
- Hove, Huib van (Bz) at the Netherlands Institute for Art History.
