= Johannes Anthonie Balthasar Stroebel =

Dutch painter

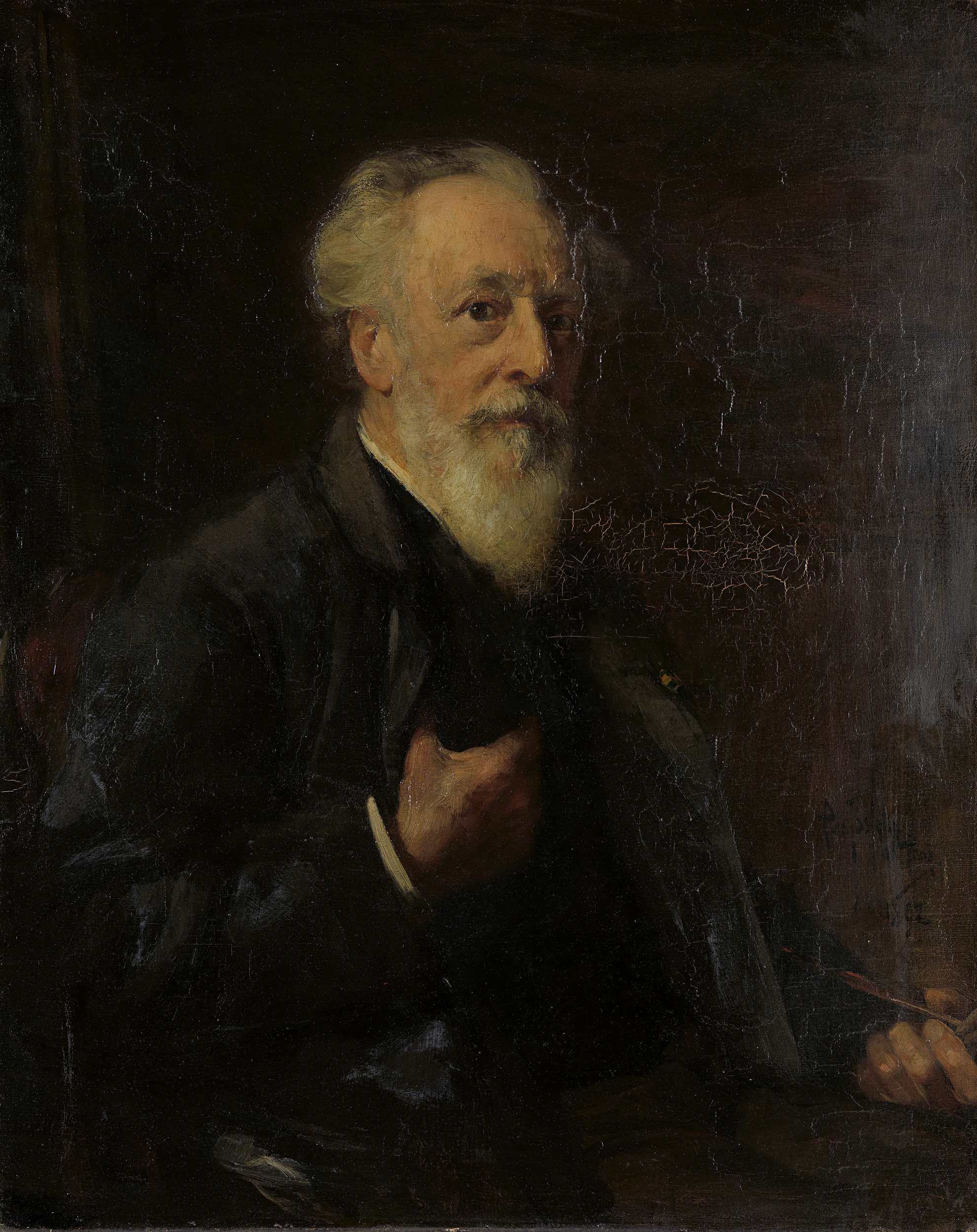
J.A.B. Stroebel by Pieter de Josselin de Jong, 1892

Johannes Anthonie Balthasar Stroebel (1821 – 1905), was a Dutch painter.

== Biography ==
He was born in The Hague where he became a student of the art academy under Bartholomeus Johannes van Hove and his son Huib. He became a member of the Pulchri Studio in the Hague and Arti et Amicitiae in Amsterdam, and is known for genre works of interiors in the style of Pieter de Hooch. He was active in The Hague, Leiderdorp, and Renkum. He died in Leiden.

== Gallery ==
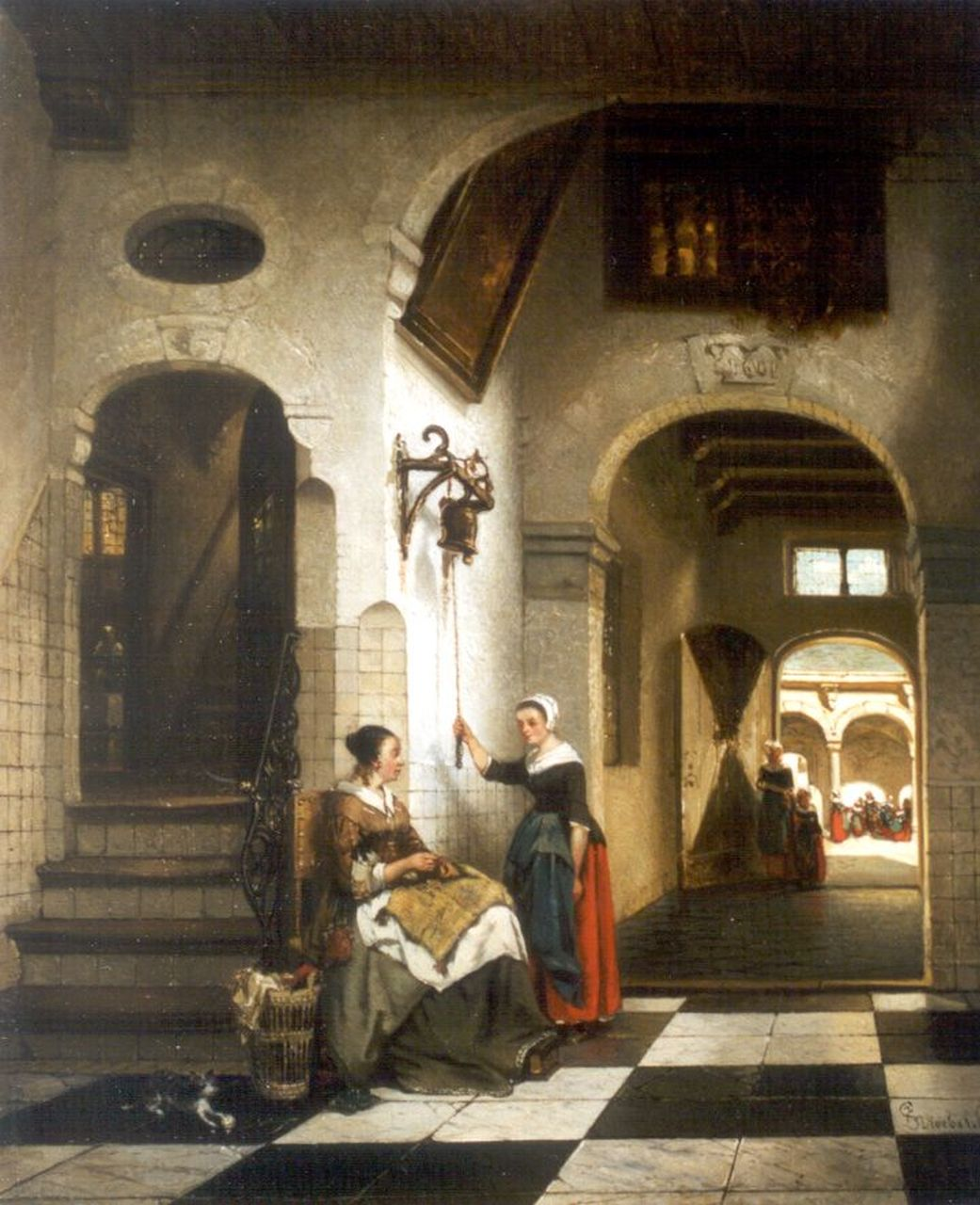
Het burgerweeshuis van Amsterdam

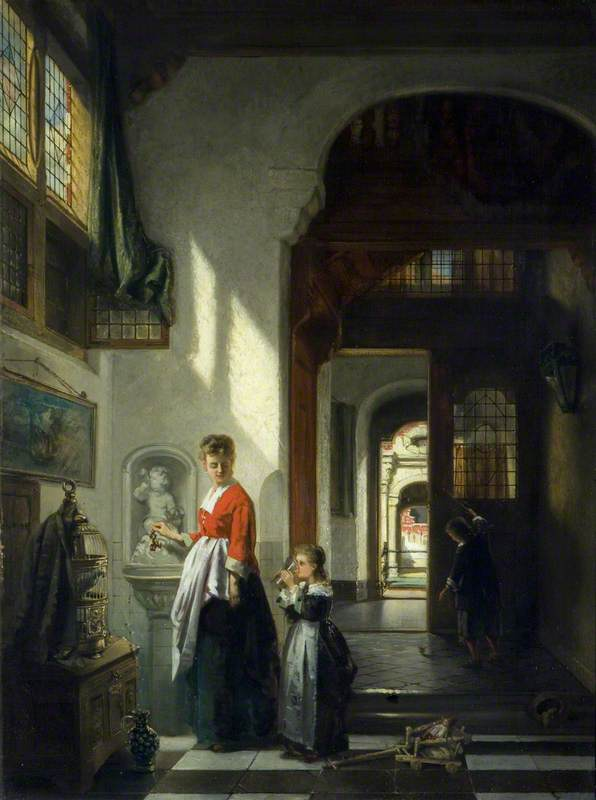
Hollands interieur

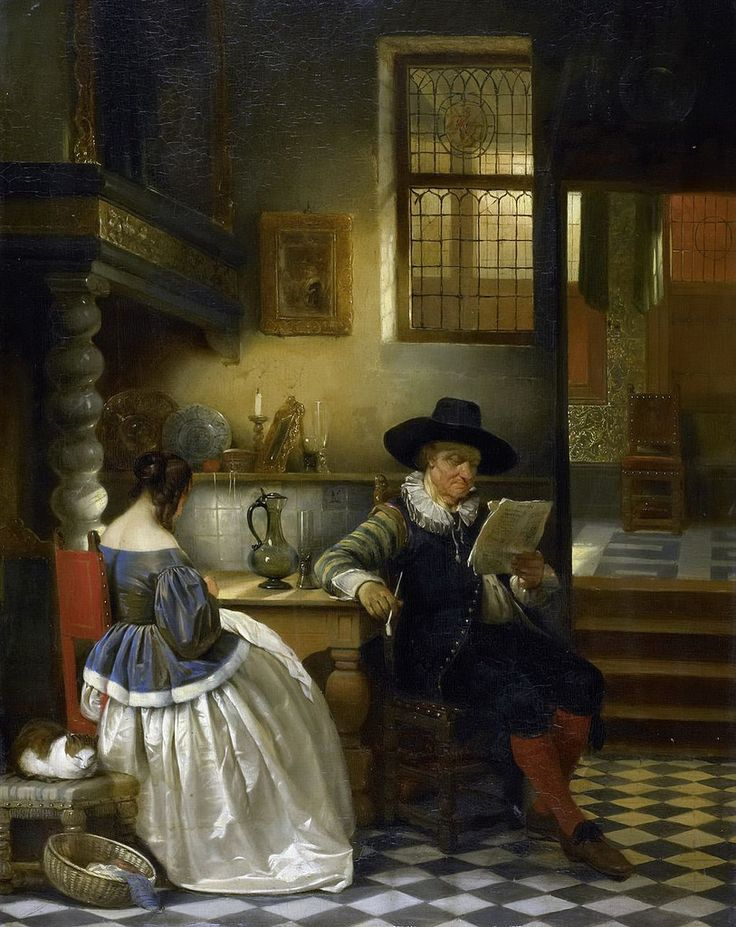
Hollandse keukenscène

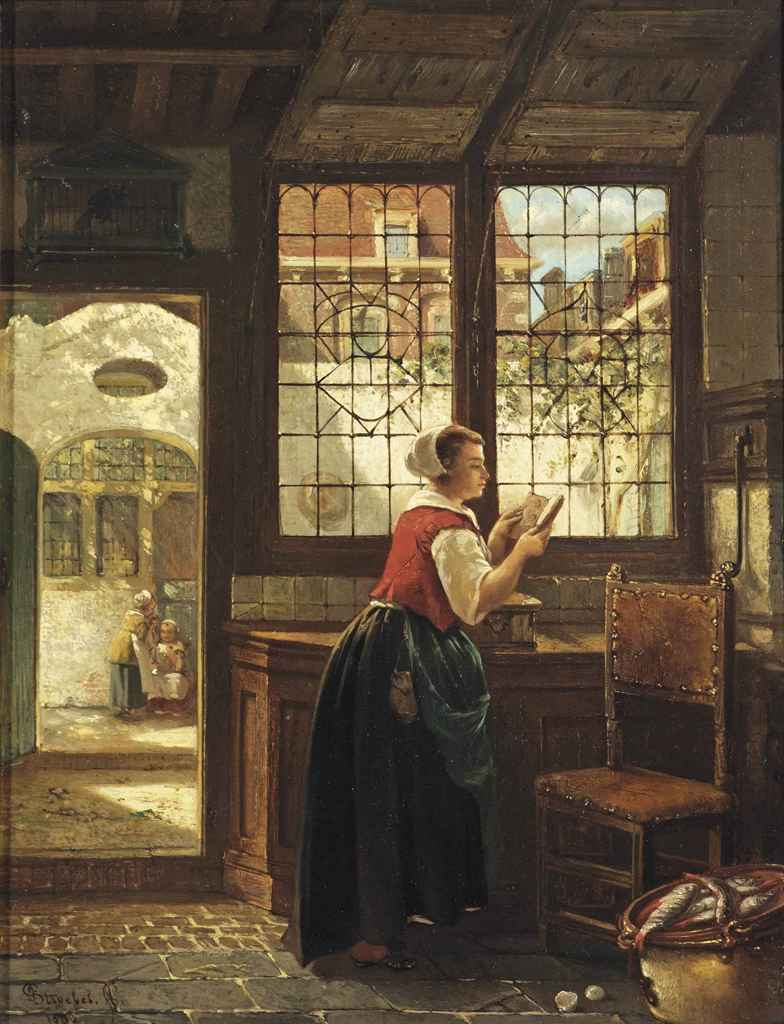
Een moment van stilte

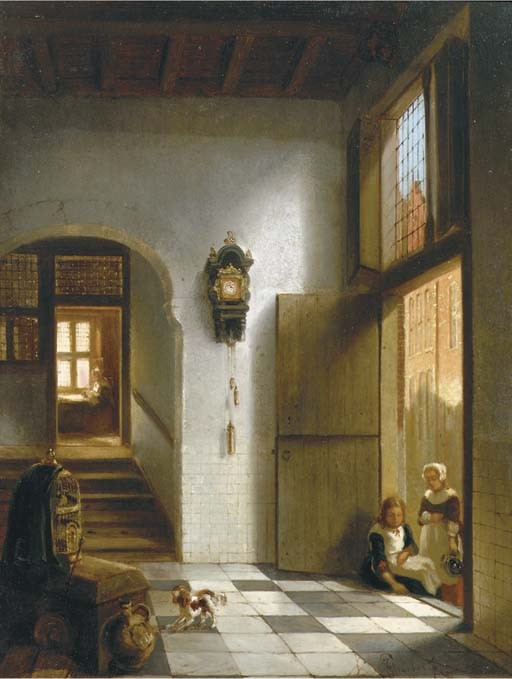
De kleine parkiet

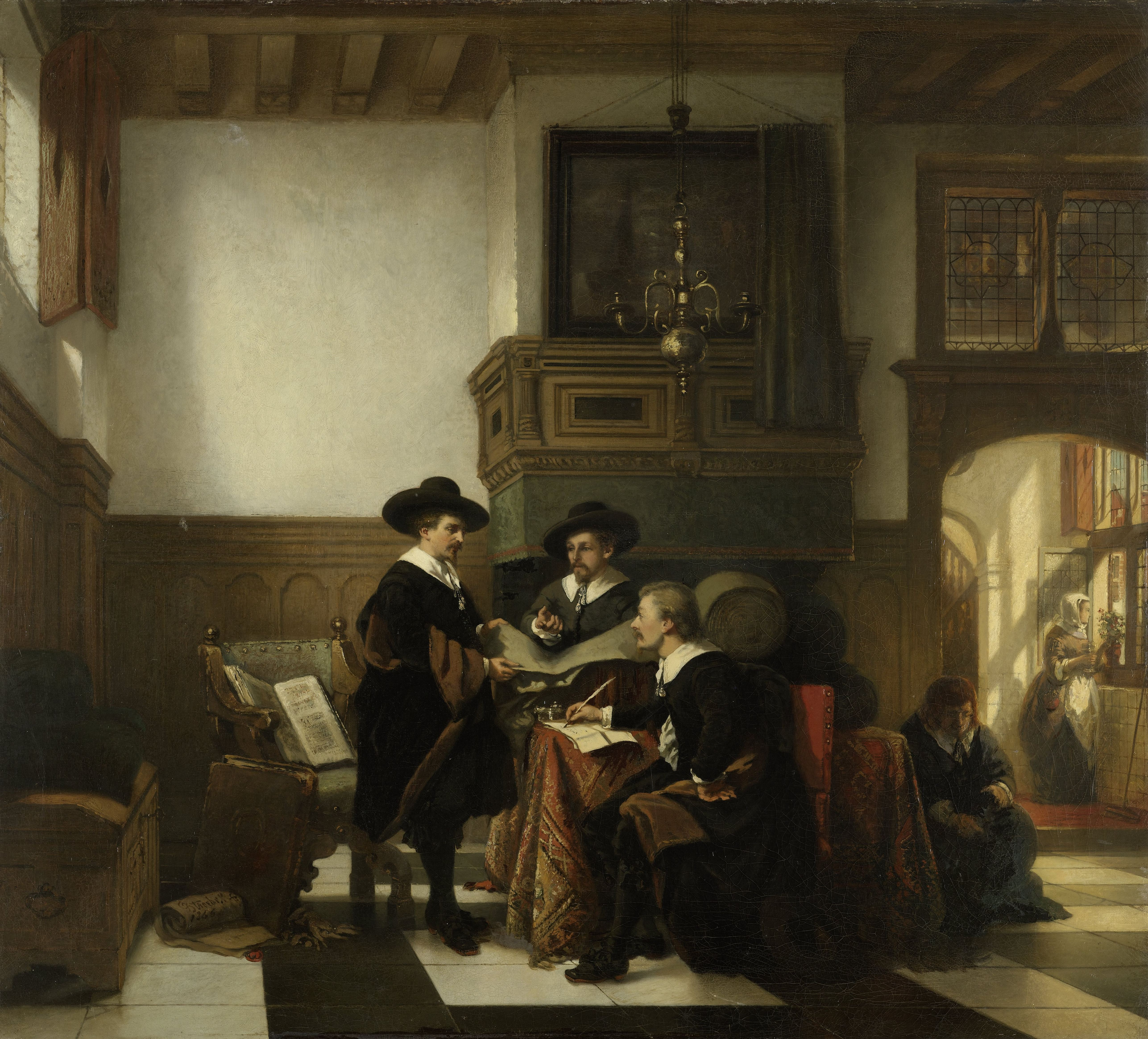
Het syndicaat van de Leindense Saaihal, Rijksmuseum

== Literature ==
- Benno Tempel, Ronald de Leeuw: Het Romantiek Boek (biography, p. 354–355). Waanders Uitgevers, Zwolle, 2006. ISBN 90-400-8942-6
