= Charles Dankmeijer =

Dutch painter

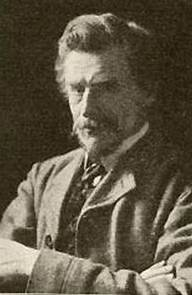
- Born: 8 April 1861; Amsterdam
- Died: 11 March 1923 (aged 61); Scheveningen
- Occupation: Painter

Carel Bernardus Dankmeijer (1861–1923), known as Charles, was a Dutch painter best known for his colorful cityscapes and river scenes.

== Biography ==
He took his first drawing lessons at the Felix Meritis Society of Amsterdam. In 1881, Dankmeijer went to Antwerp, where he studied at the Royal Academy of Fine Arts with Charles Verlat and won the "Prix d'Excellence". From 1882 to 1886, he was enrolled at the Rijksakademie. His professors there were August Allebé and Barend Wijnveld. He then joined the artists' colony in Laren, and came under the influence of Anton Mauve.

After Mauve's death, Dankmeijer returned to Amsterdam and was married. For many years after that, he moved frequently; living in The Hague, Loosduinen, Zaandam, Renkum (where he worked with Théophile de Bock), Oosterbeek, Leiden and, finally, Scheveningen. This was interspersed with travels to France and Italy. In 1900, he won a medal at the Exposition Universelle.

== Gallery ==
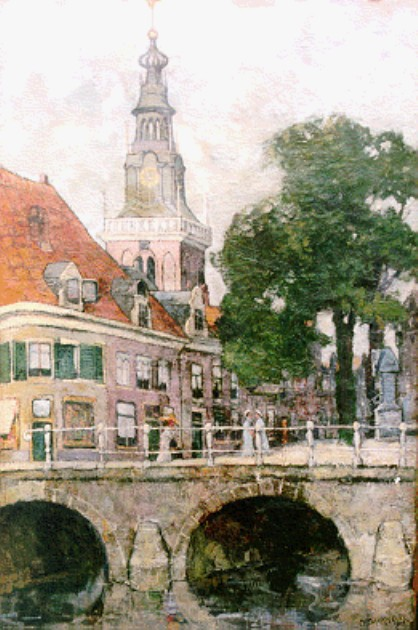
View of Alkmaar

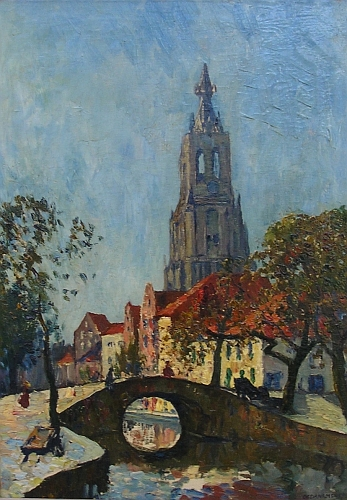
View of Delft

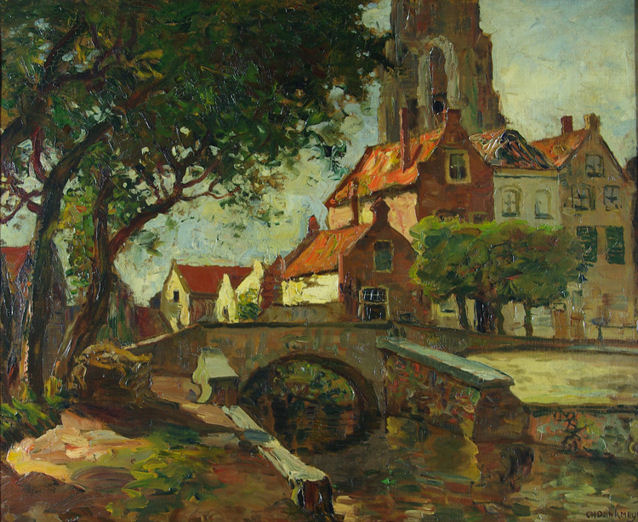
View of Goedereede

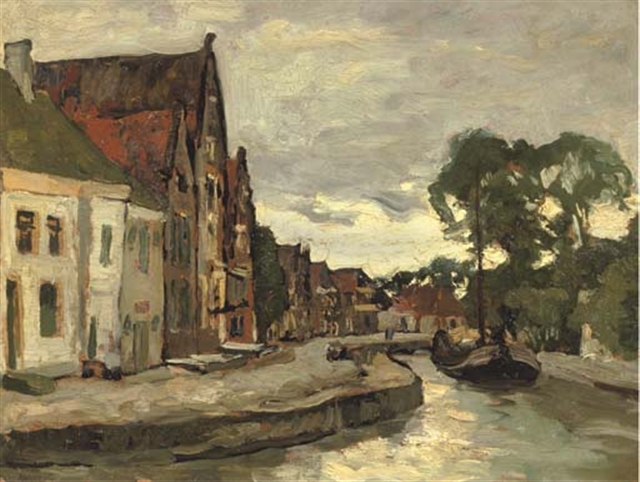
A Canal in Hoorn

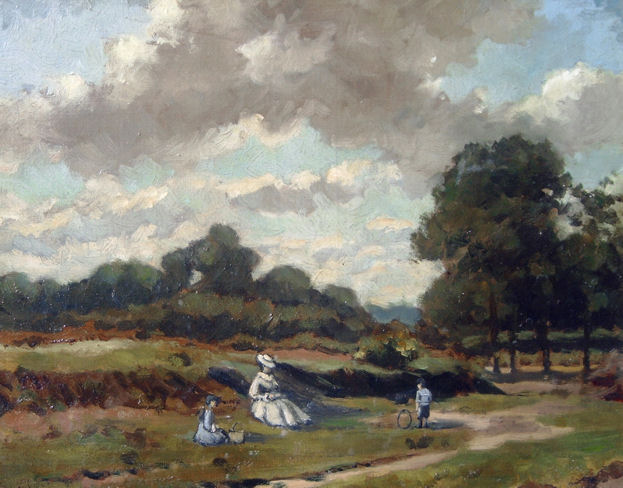
Picnic
