= Johannes Bosboom =

Dutch painter

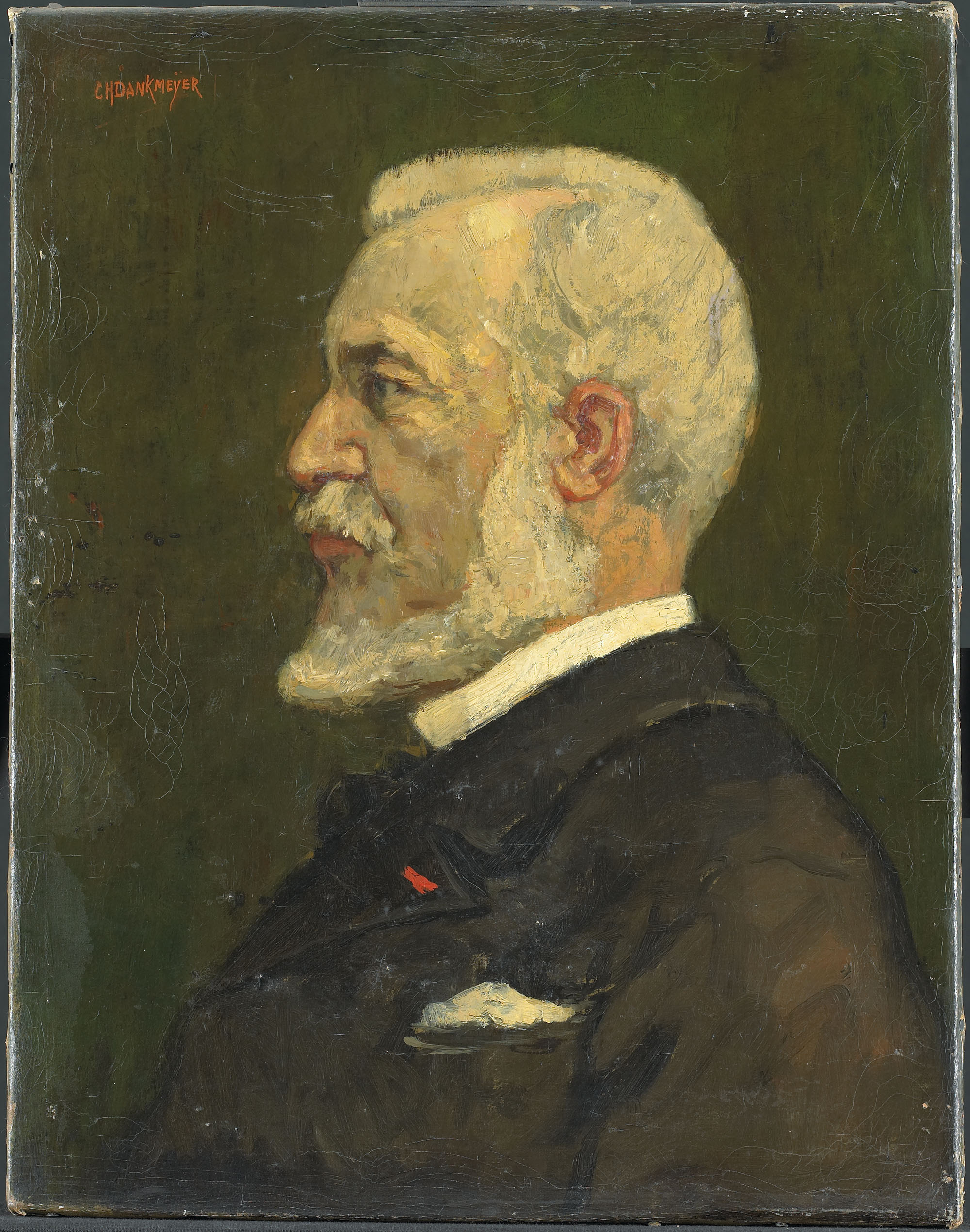
- Johannes Bosboom, by Charles Dankmeijer
- Born: 18 February 1817; The Hague
- Died: 14 September 1891 (aged 74); The Hague
- Education: Royal Academy of Art, The Hague
- Known for: Painting
- Notable work: View of the Paris Quay and the Cathedral at Rouen; Inneres einer gotischen Kirche
- Spouse: Anna Louisa Geertruida Bosboom-Toussaint

Johannes Bosboom (18 February 1817 – 14 September 1891) was a Dutch painter and watercolorist of the Hague School, known especially for his paintings of church interiors.

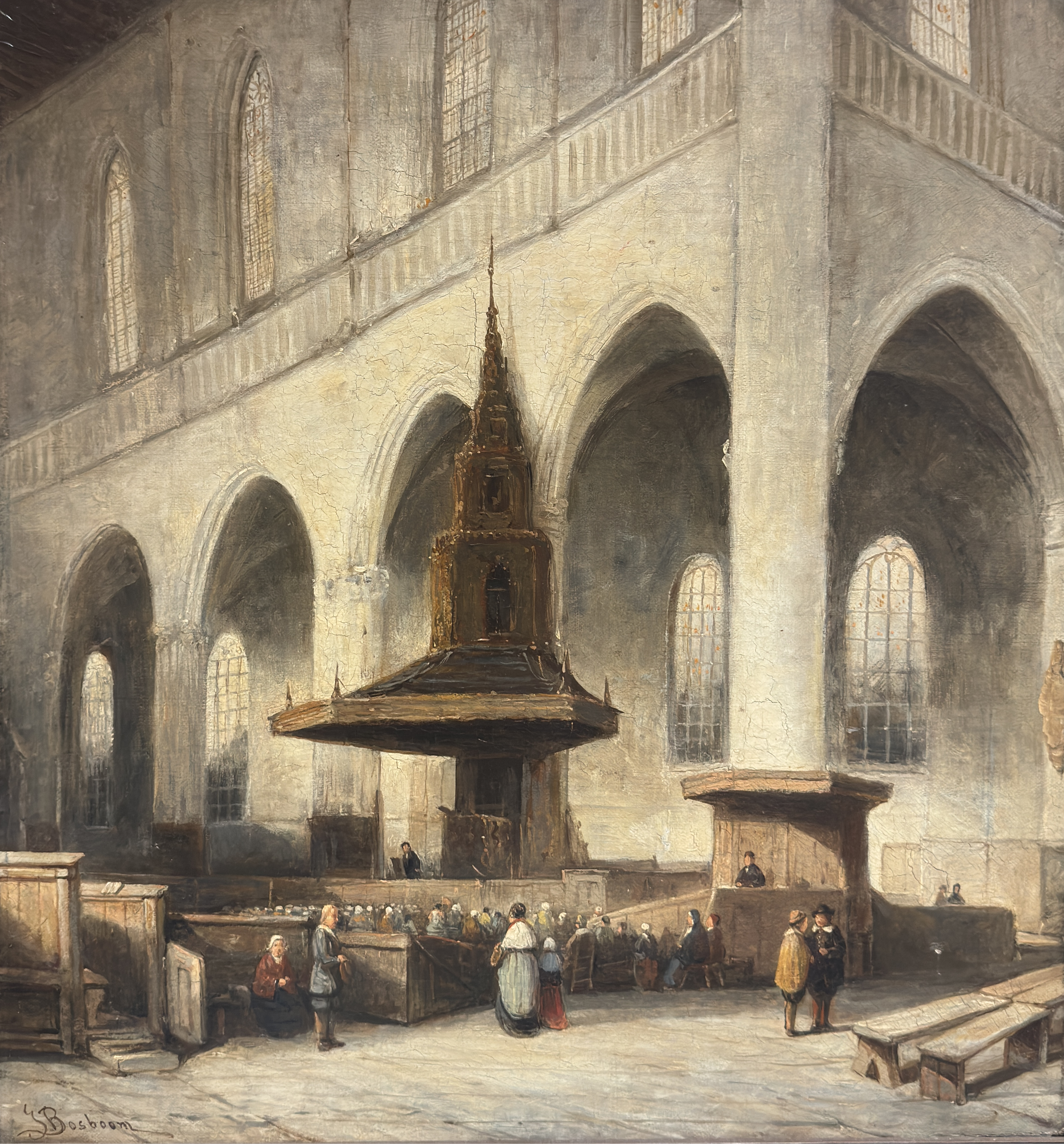
Inneres einer gotischen Kirche, c.1870

== Biography ==
He was born in The Hague. At the age of 14 he became a student of Bartholomeus van Hove and painted in his studio along with Van Hove's son Hubertus van Hove. Together they worked on the pieces of scenery that Van Hove created for the Royal Theatre in The Hague. In addition, Bosboom took lessons from 1831 to 1835 and again from 1839 to 1840 in the Hague Academy of Art. Here he also made the acquaintance of Anthonie Waldorp and Wijnand Nuyen. In 1851 he married the novelist Anna Louisa Geertruida Bosboom-Toussaint.

The young Bosboom traveled to Germany in 1835 to Düsseldorf, Cologne and Koblenz and painted the watercolor View of the Mosel Bridge at Koblenz. This painting was purchased by Andreas Schelfhout, who became his confidant and friend. In 1839 he traveled to Paris and Rouen and received a silver medal for View of the Paris Quay and the Cathedral at Rouen. He also painted a number of church interiors, a relatively traditional genre in which the seventeenth century artists Pieter Saenredam and Emanuel de Witte served as important examples. Bosboom had a great deal of success with these pieces, and for the rest of his career he would repeatedly return to this theme, which was the one in which he would achieve his greatest fame.

Bosboom's choice of subject matter may seem to isolate him from the rest of the Hague School, but his search for ways to reproduce the spatial atmosphere through light, shadow, and nuances of color places him in the very mainstream of this group.

Bosboom was a member of the Pulchri Studio and served as its chairman in 1852–1853.

In 1873, during a stay in Scheveningen, he painted many watercolors of town views, the dunes, the beach and the sea. It is possible that these watercolors encouraged Hendrik Willem Mesdag and Jacob Maris to concentrate further on the sea and beach as subjects.

Bosboom died in The Hague on 14 September 1891.

== Honours ==
1886: Officer in the Order of Leopold.

== Gallery ==
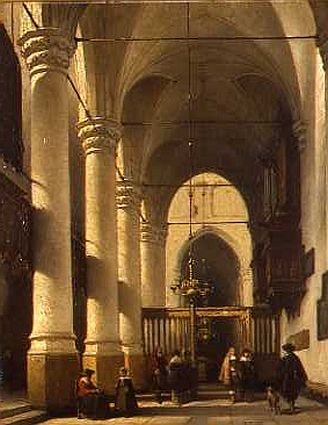
Bakenesserkerk Interior (1870). Dordrecht's Museum aan de Haven.

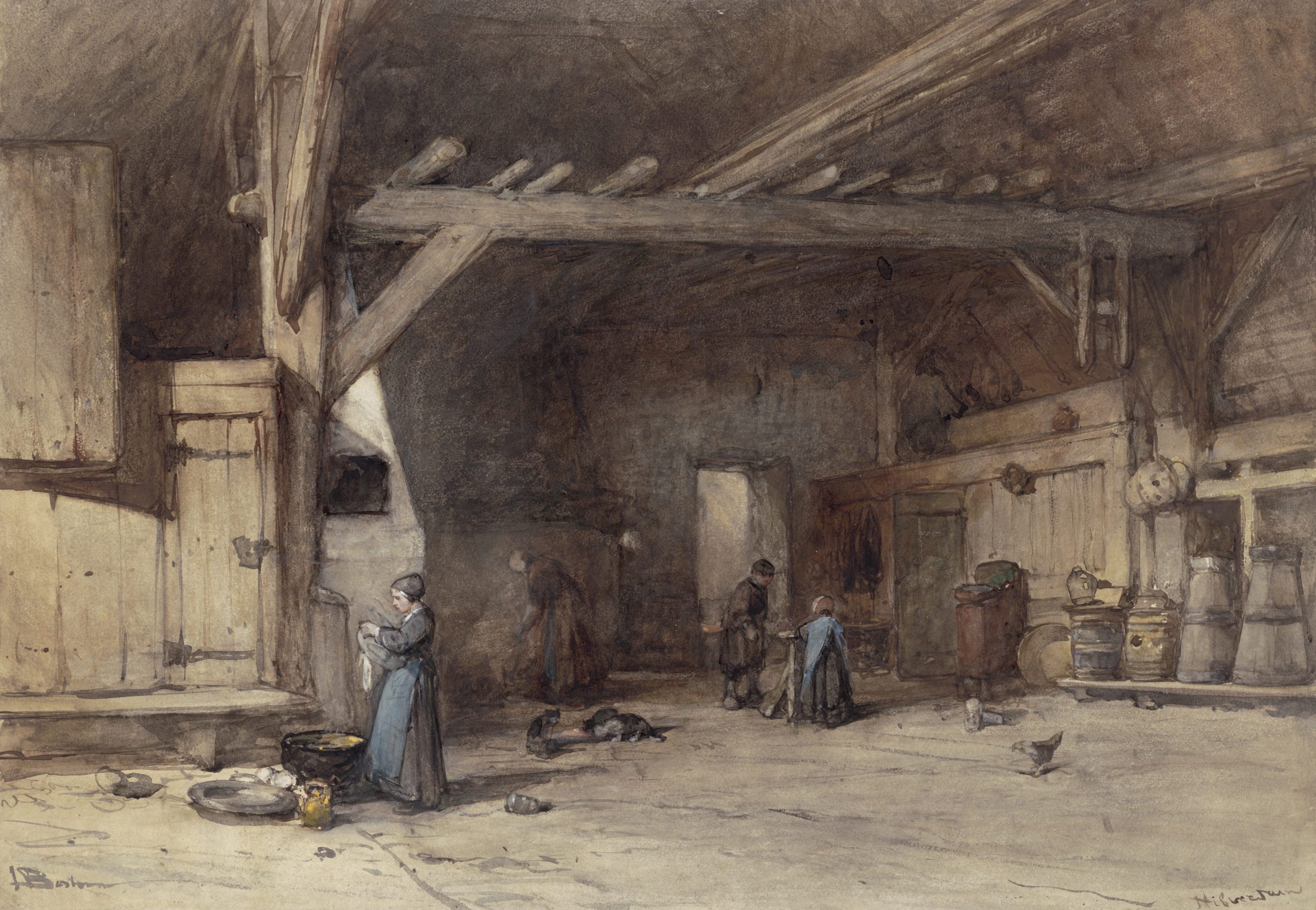
Interieur van een boerendeel bij Hilversum

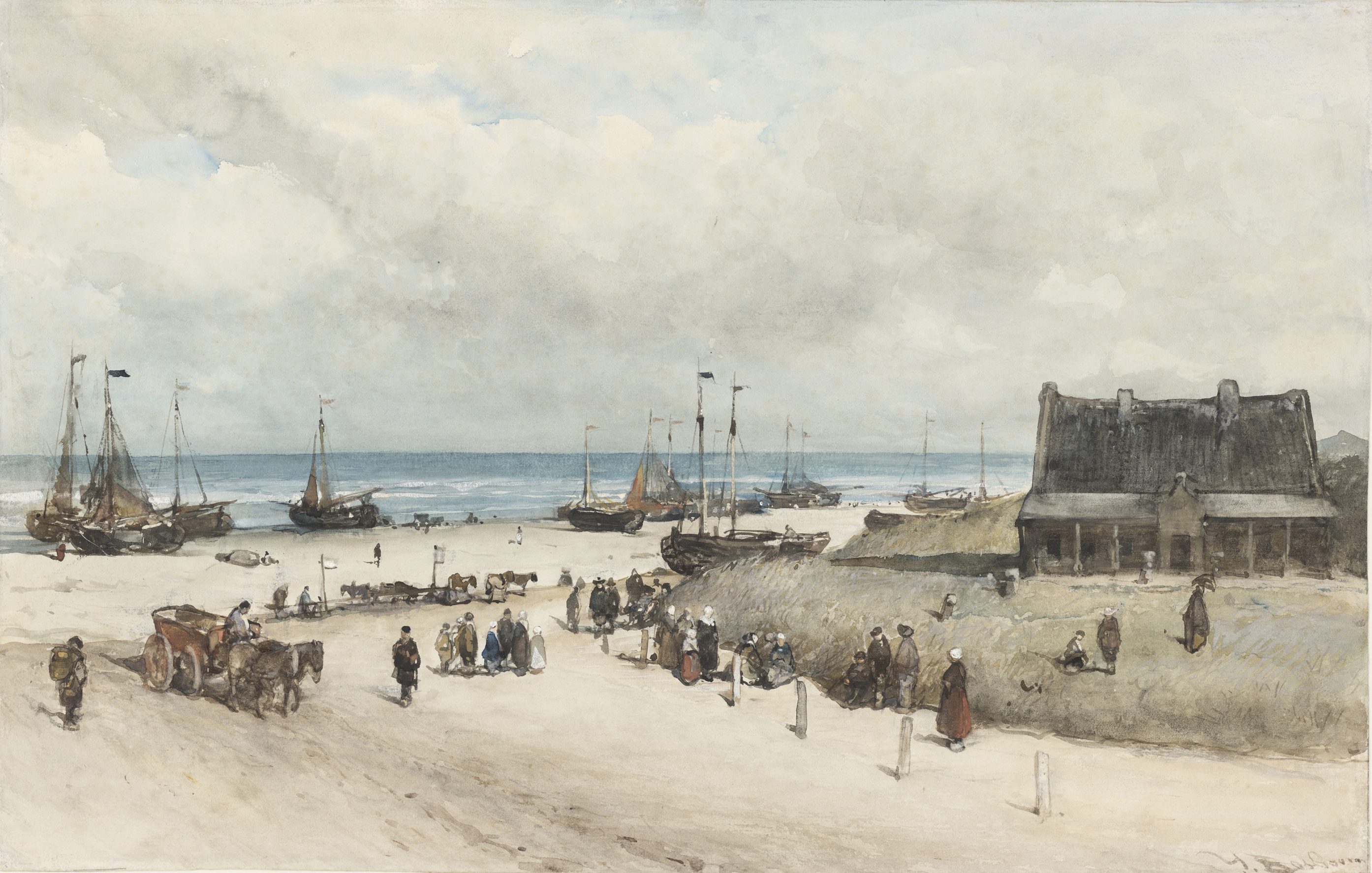
Het strand te Scheveningen

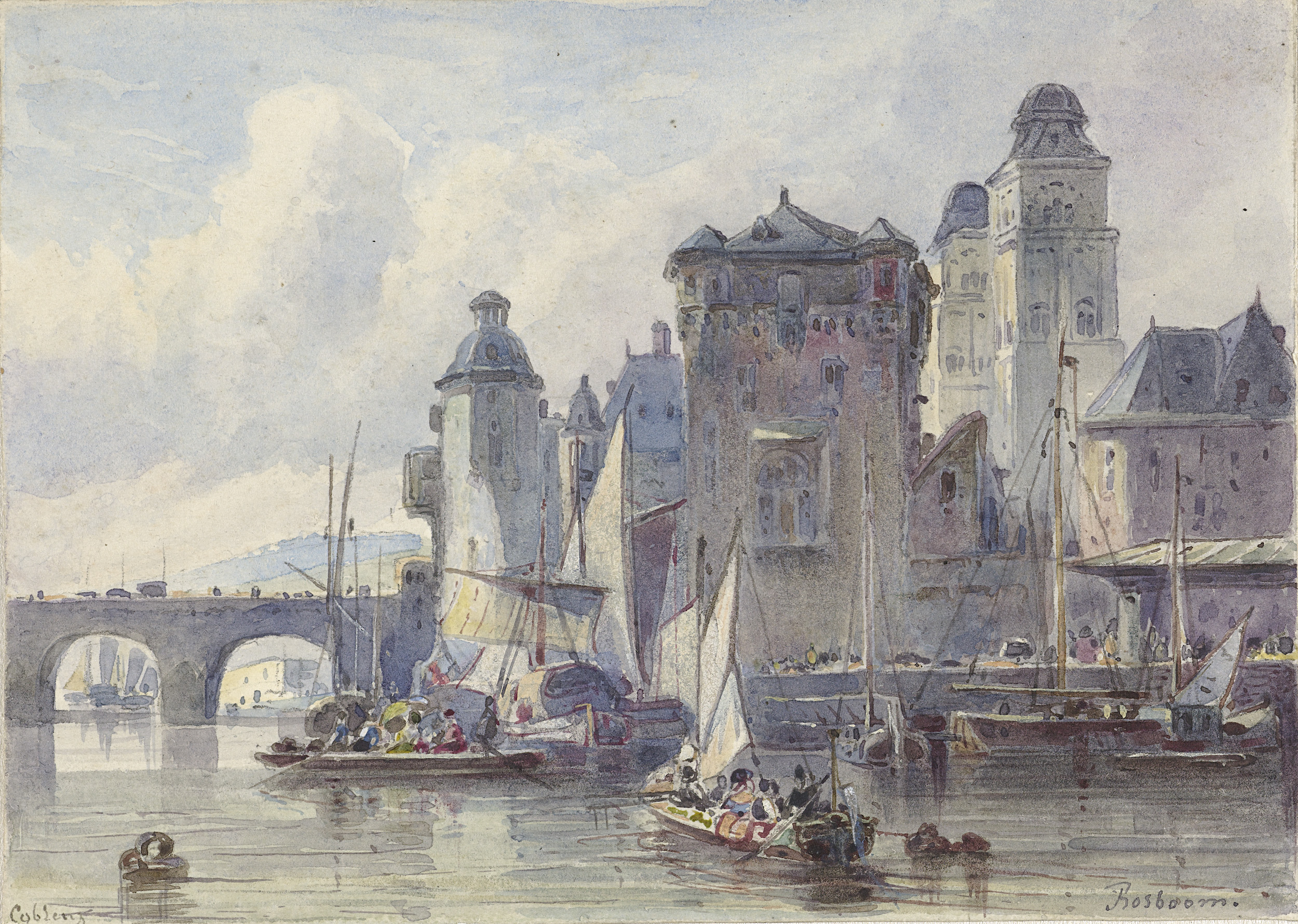
Gezicht te Koblenz (watercolor)

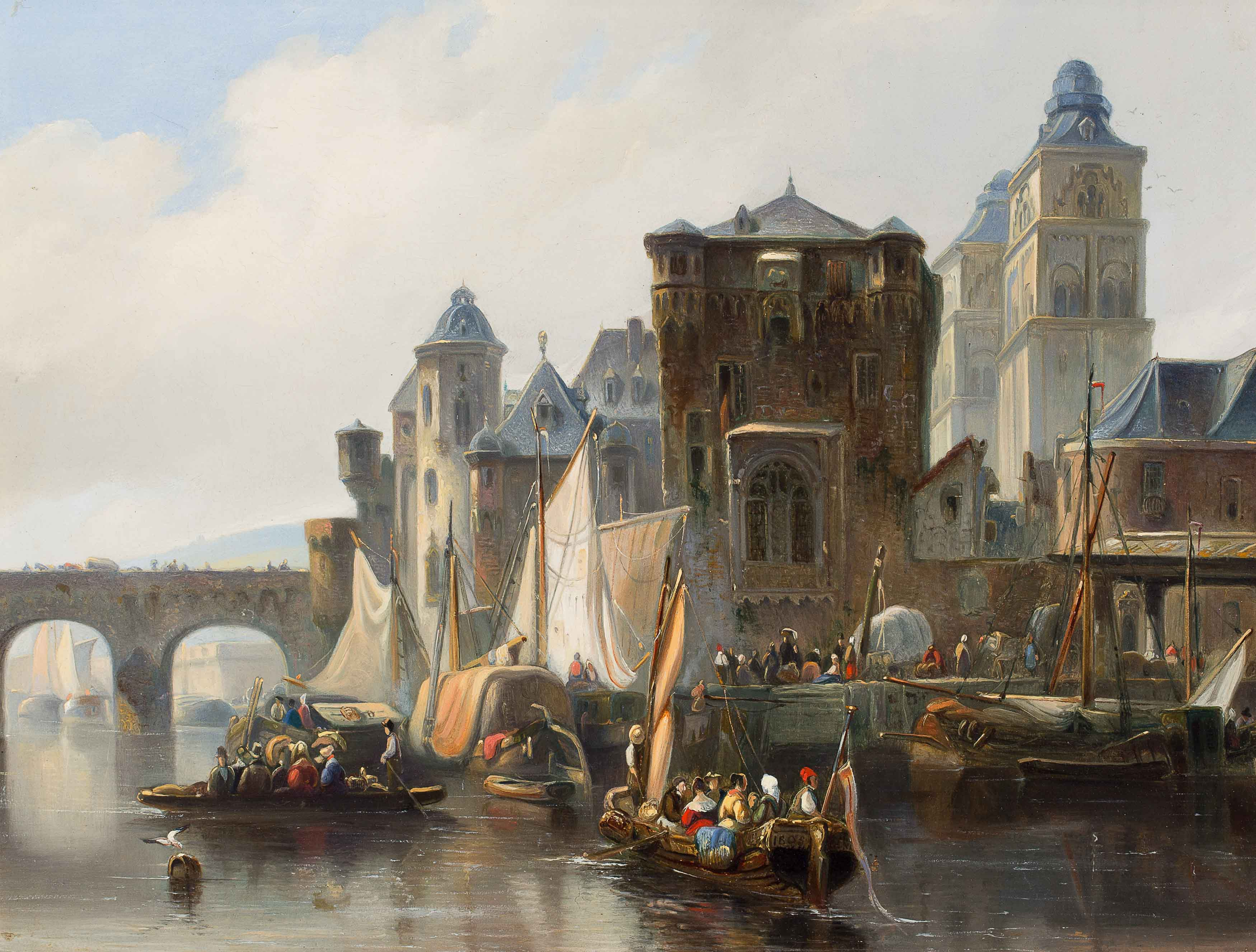
Gezicht te Koblenz (1835)

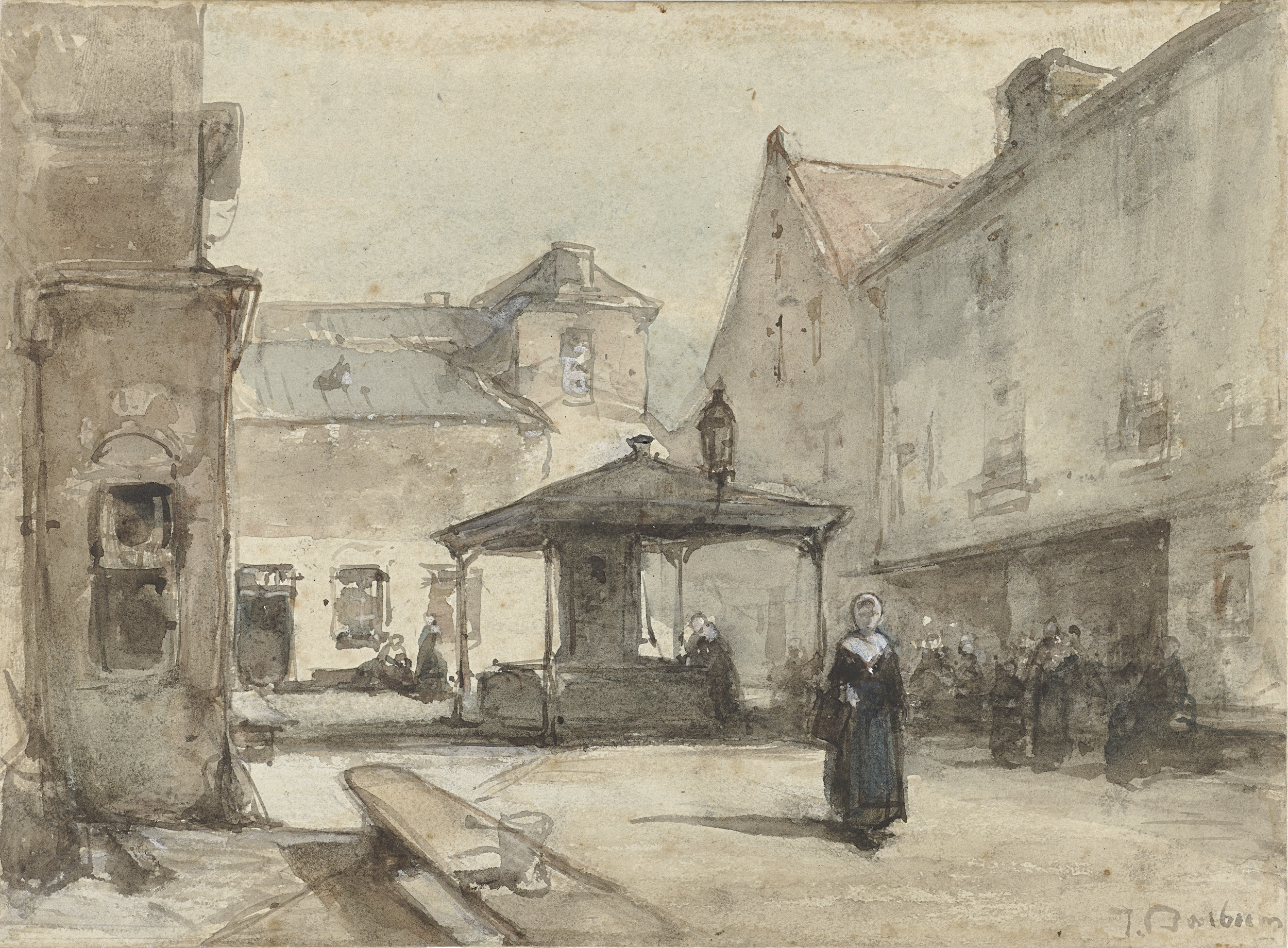
Stadspleintje

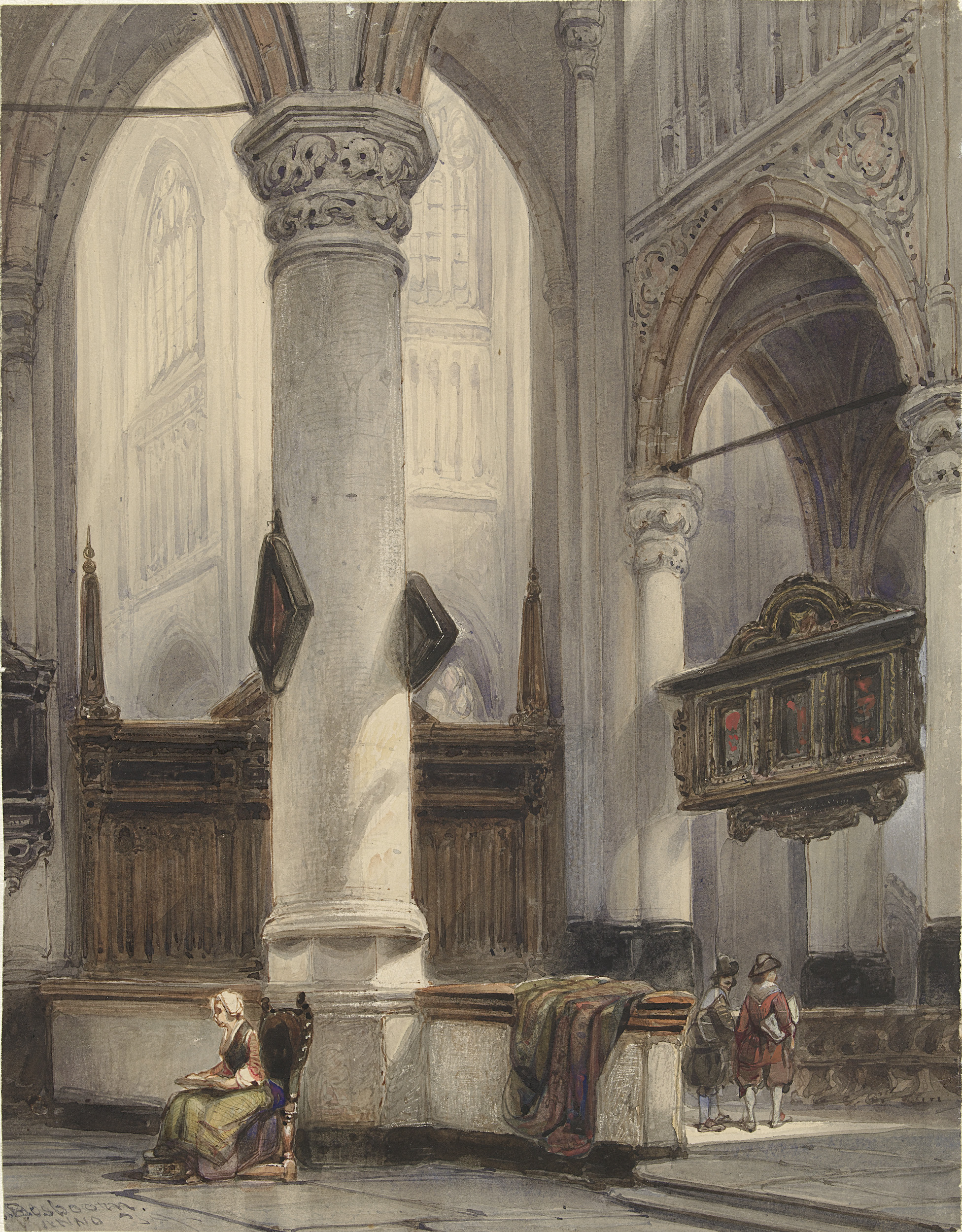
Interieur van de Nieuwe Kerk te Delft

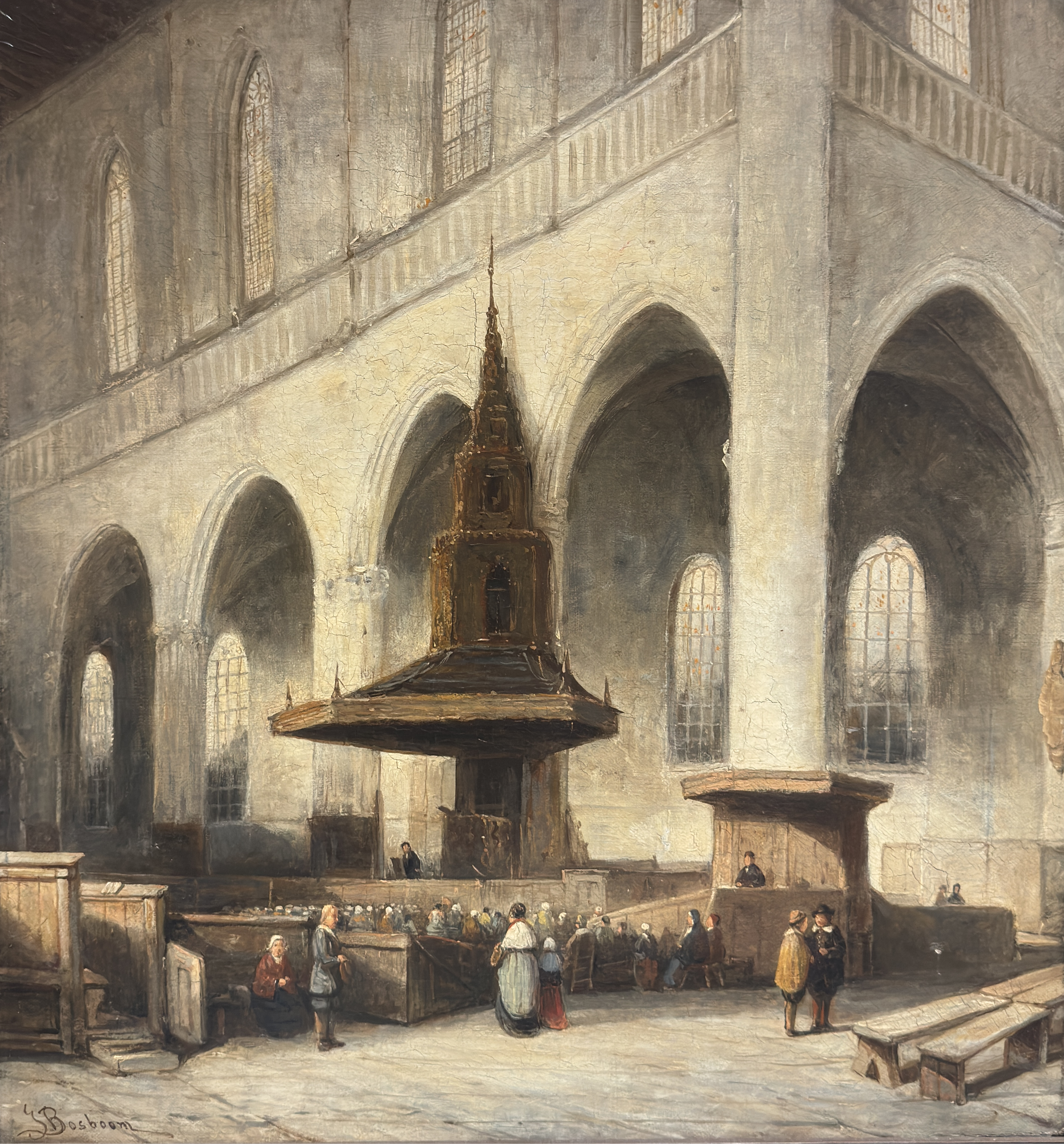
Inneres einer gotischen Kirche.

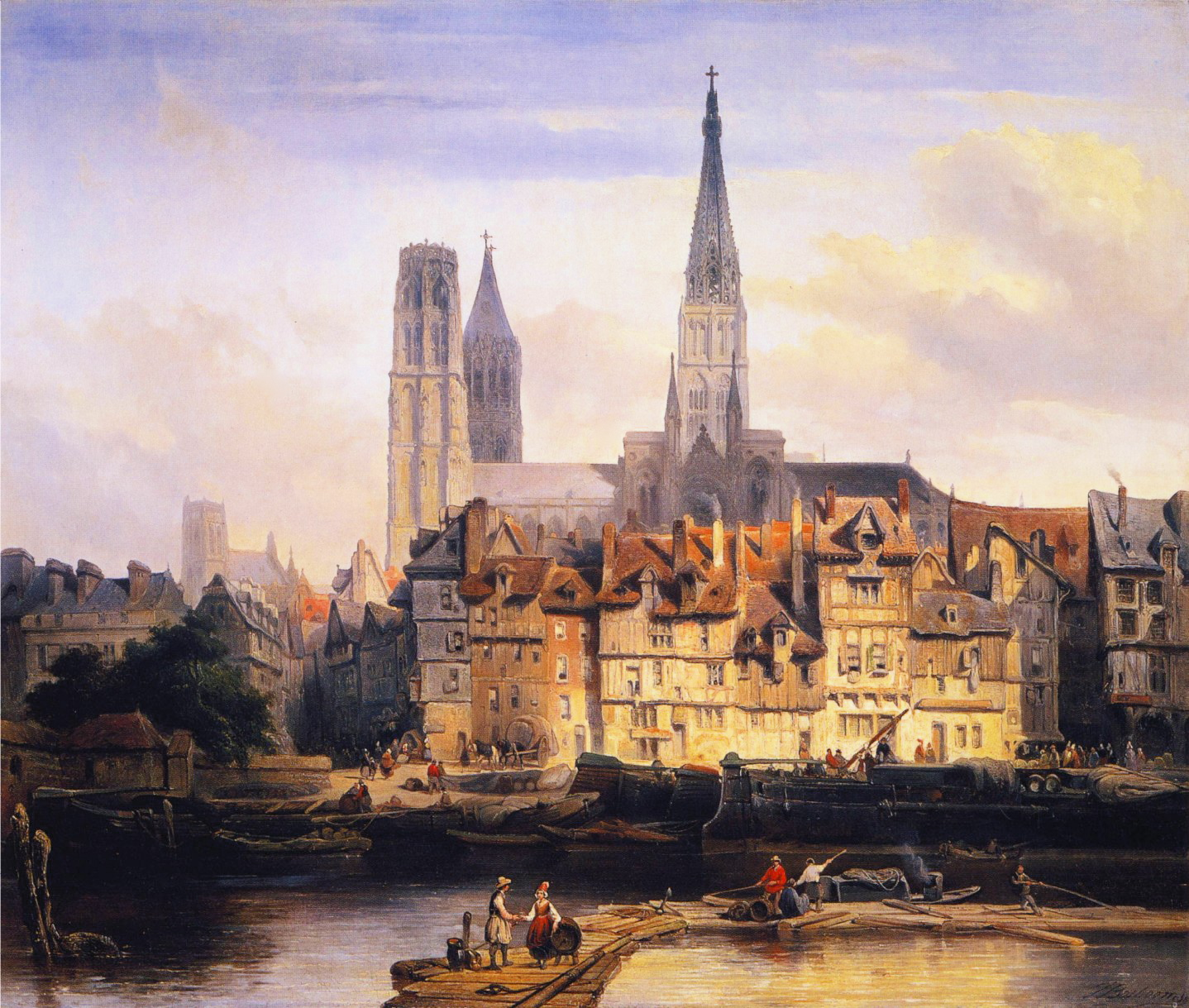
View of the Paris Quay and the Cathedral at Rouen

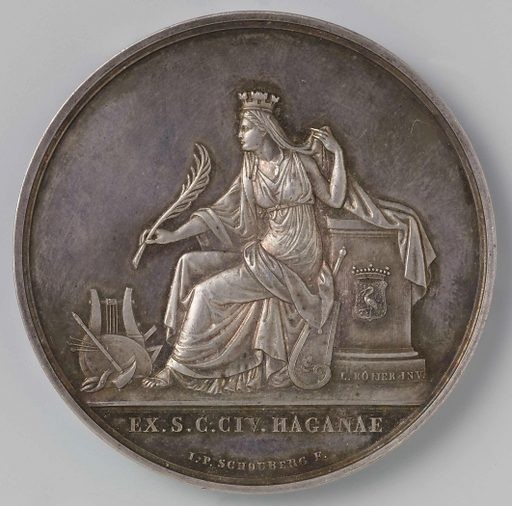
Silver medal awarded in 1839

== Sources ==
- Sillevis, John and Tabak, Anne, The Hague School Book, Waanders Uitgegevers, Zwolle, 2004 (pp 195–203)
