= Frederik Hendrik Kaemmerer =

Dutch painter

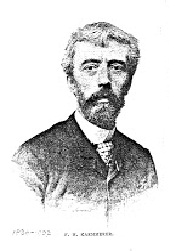
Self-portrait (c.1880)

Frederik Hendrik Kaemmerer (23 October 1839 – 4 April 1902) was a Dutch painter. He originally worked in the Romantic and Academic styles, but later became an Impressionist.

== Biography ==
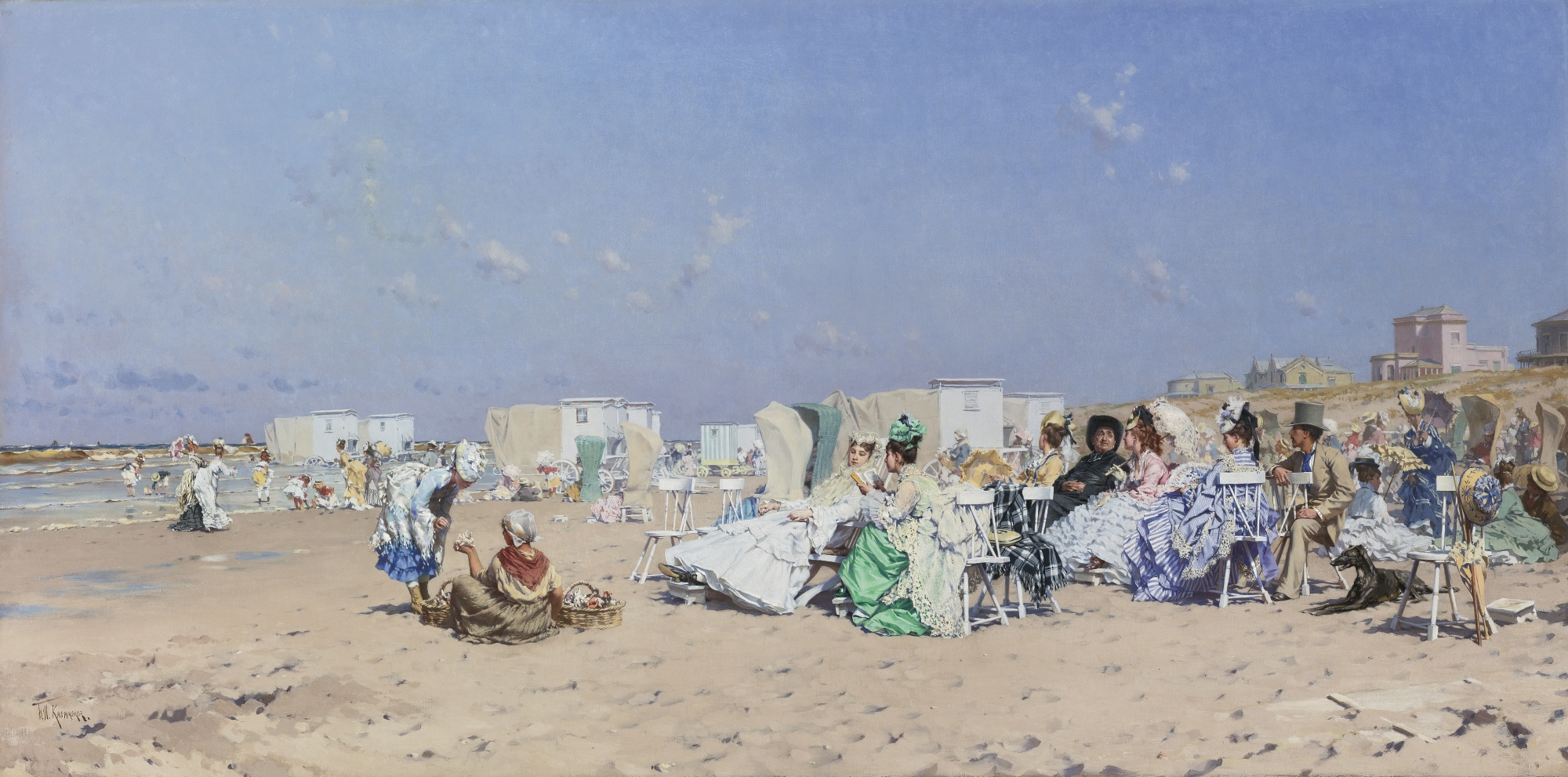
The Beach at Scheveningen, 1874

He was born in The Hague and began his artistic studies at the Royal Academy of Art with Salomon Verveer, who taught in the Romantic tradition. His early works were mostly landscapes in the style of the Hague School. His first solo exhibition was in 1861 in Rotterdam.

In 1865, attracted by new trends in art, he went to Paris and enrolled at the Académie des Beaux-Arts, where he studied with Jean-Léon Gérôme and switched to a more Academic style. For a time, he specialized in French genre scenes set in the 18th century, featuring elegant ladies with courteous men. In 1870, he held his first exhibition at the Salon and won a medal there in 1874.

He established a studio in Paris and became a client of Goupil & Cie, but frequently returned to The Hague with friends and would stay at a seaside hotel in Scheveningen. It was during these stays that he began his transition to Impressionism; inspired by the effects of sunlight on the water and the fleeting changes of light and shadow on the sand. His work in this style proved to be successful, both in France and the Netherlands and he was awarded a silver medal at the Exposition Universelle (1889).

After 1891, he worked as an illustrator for Elsevier; contributing to their Neerland's Pen en Stift series ("Dutch literature illustrated by Dutch artists"). His first drawings appeared in Eene Illuzie, a collection of stories by Louis Couperus.

He apparently committed suicide at his studio in Paris. His works are in museums throughout France and the Netherlands, as well as in Munich and the Clark Art Institute in Williamstown, Massachusetts.

== Selected paintings ==
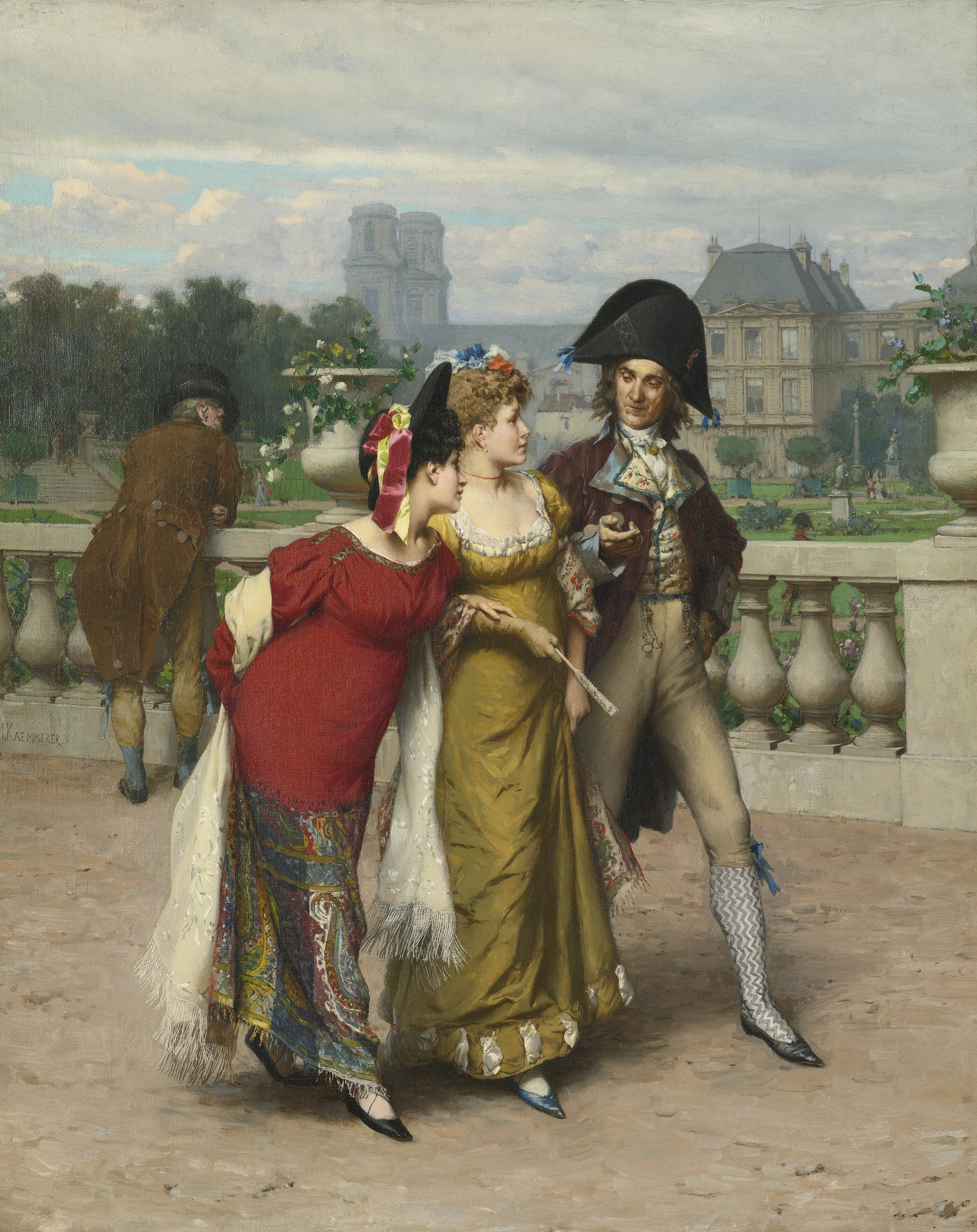
During the Directorate

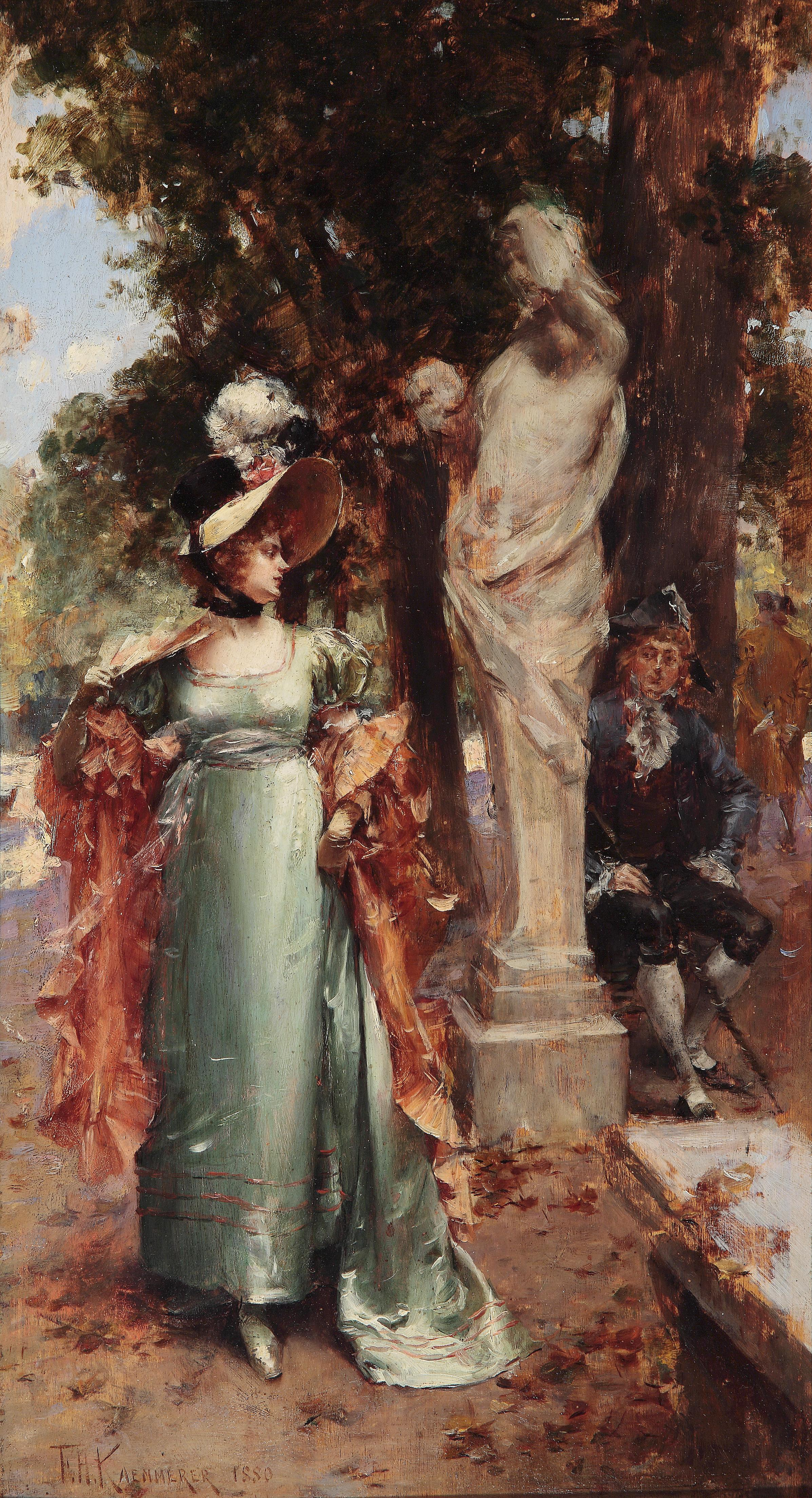
In the Park, 1880

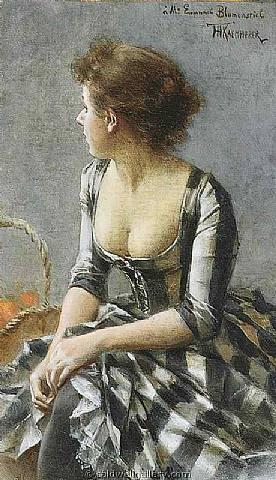
Portrait of a Woman, c. 1895

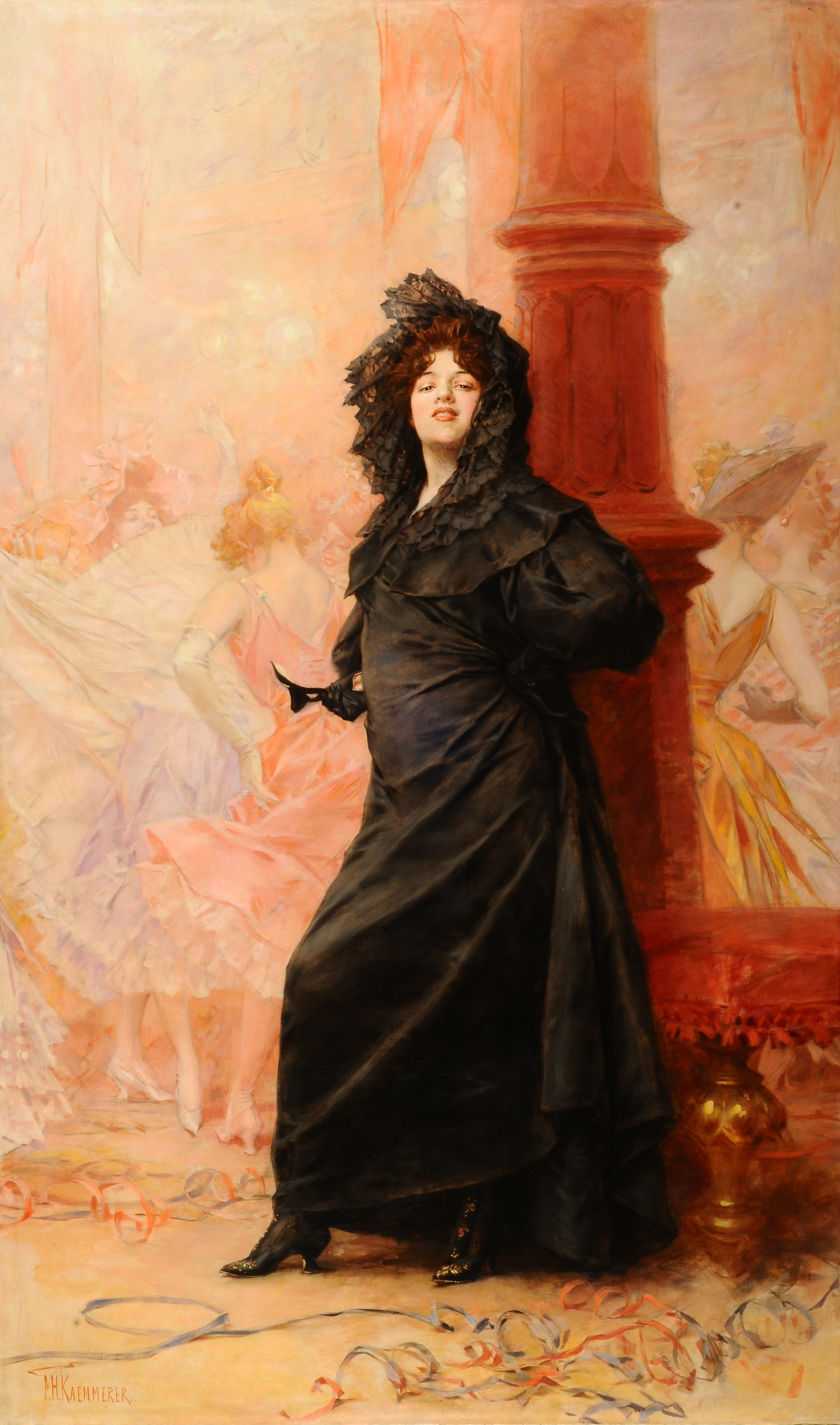
At the Masquerade Ball

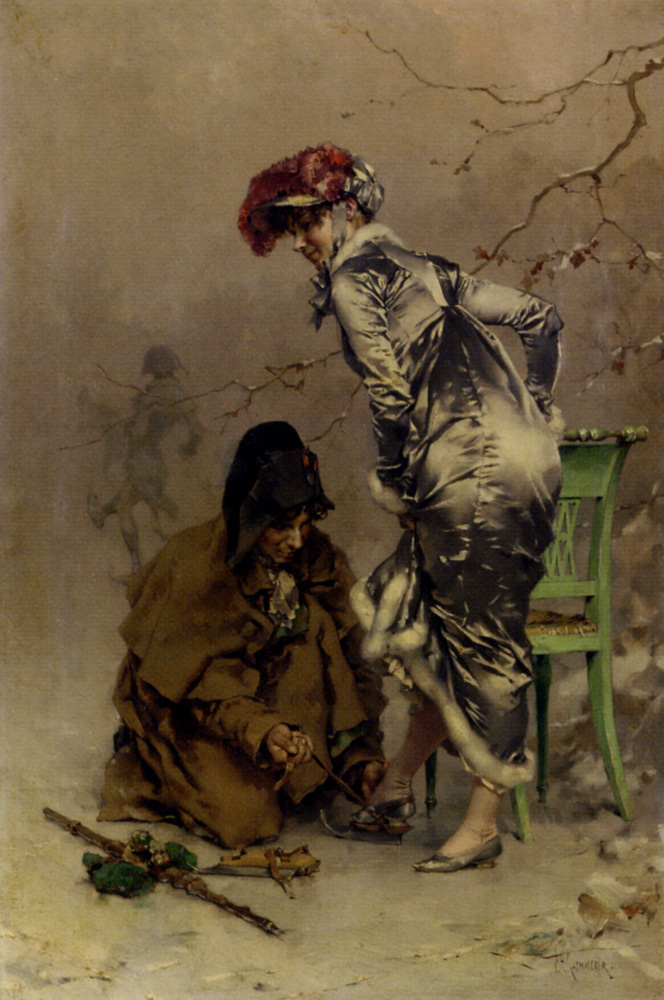
A Winter Escapade, c. 1870
