= Hague School =

Artistic movement emerged in The Hague

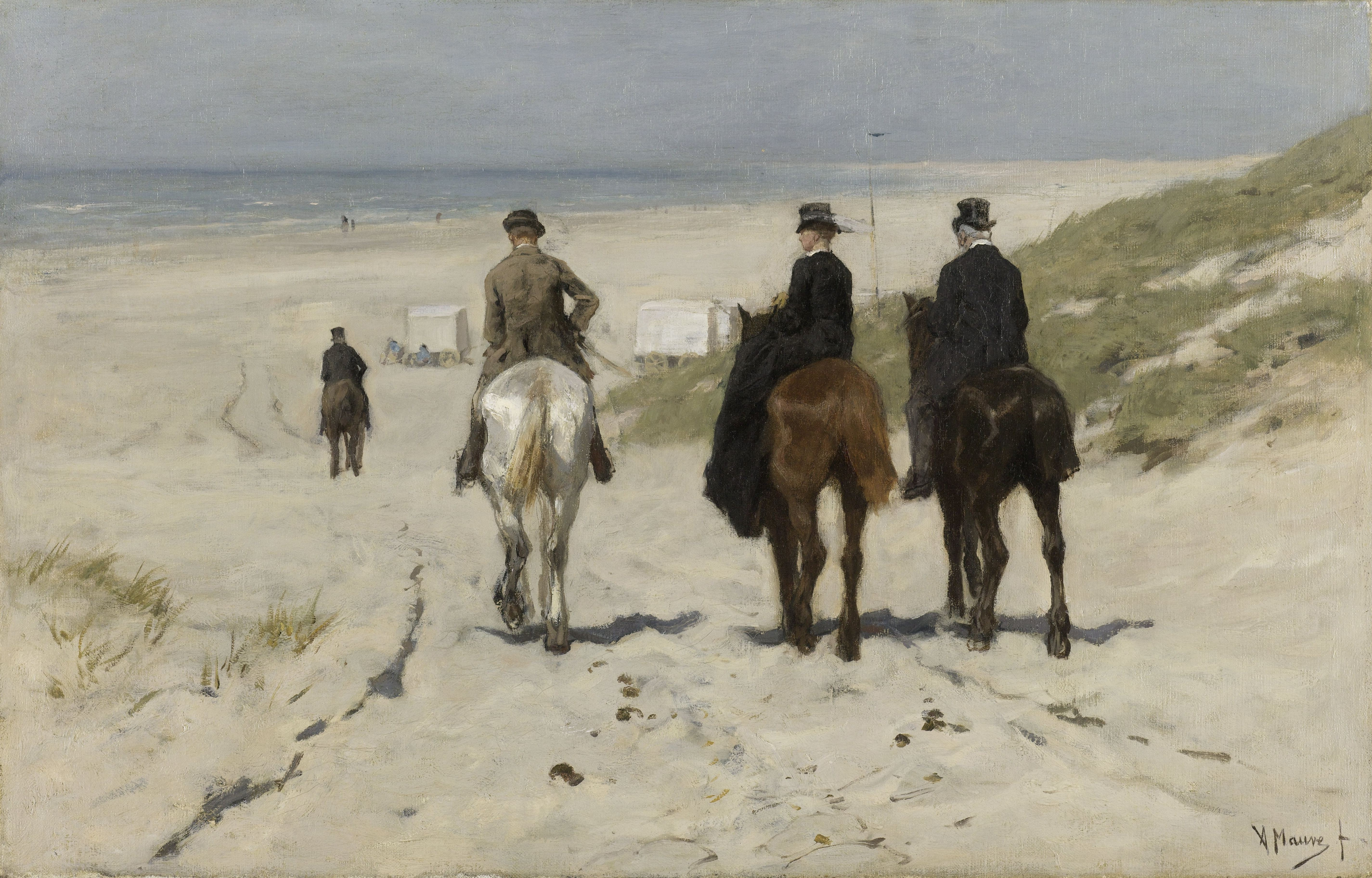
- Morning Ride on the Beach (1876) by Anton Mauve
- Years active: 1860—1890
- Location: The Hague
- Influences: Barbizon School

The Hague School (Dutch: Haagse School) is a group of artists, who lived and worked in The Hague between 1860 and 1890. Their work was heavily influenced by the realist painters of the French Barbizon school. The painters of the Hague School generally made use of relatively sombre colours, which is why the Hague School is sometimes called the Grey School.

== Precursors ==
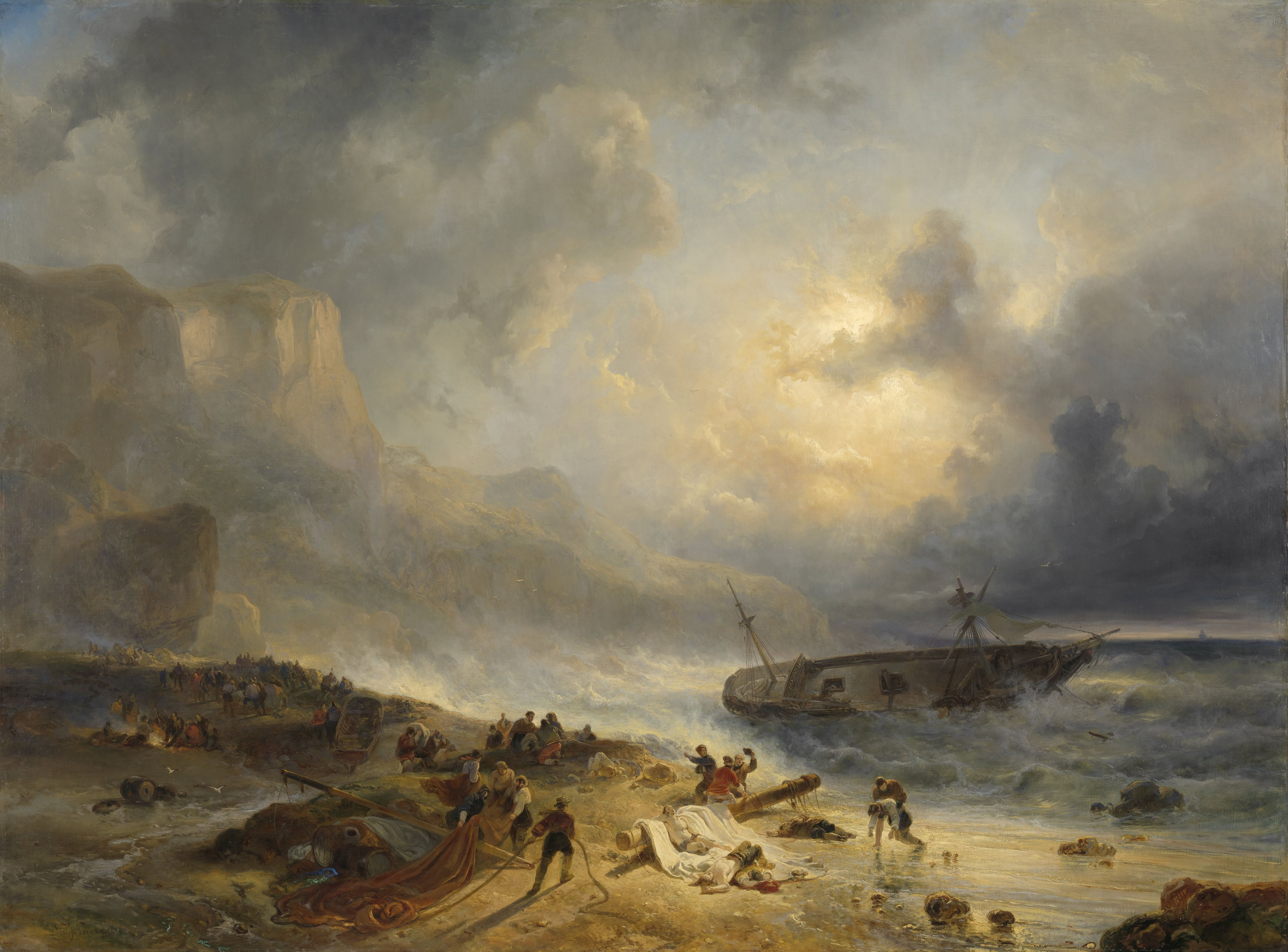
Shipwreck on a Rocky Coast (1828-39) by Wijnand Nuyen

After the great periods of Dutch art in the Golden Age of the 17th century, there were economic and political problems which diminished activity in art. The fine arts in the Netherlands enjoyed a revival around 1830, a time now referred to as the Romantic period in Dutch painting. The style was an imitation of the great 17th-century artists. The most widely accepted paintings of this period were landscapes and paintings which reflected national history. Andreas Schelfhout was a painter of landscapes, especially winter scenes, but also woodlands and the dunes between The Hague and Scheveningen. His best-known pupils included Wijnand Nuijen, Johan Barthold Jongkind, and Jan Hendrik Weissenbruch. Schelfhout's friend and occasional collaborator Hendrik van de Sande Bakhuyzen principally composed pastoral landscapes like those of Golden Age master Paulus Potter, but trained several prominent Hague School artists, notably his son Julius van de Sande Bakhuyzen, Willem Roelofs, François Pieter ter Meulen, Hubertus van Hove, and Weissenbruch. Wijnand Nuijen was one of the best of the romantic artists of the time and he had a great influence on Weissenbruch and Johannes Bosboom.

Art training at that time was usually in the form of drawing schools, with no painting classes. Many young artists who later became members of the Hague School were frustrated by this and scattered to various places to receive the training they desired. Gerard Bilders left the Hague Academy of Drawing and completed training with the Swiss animal painter, Charles Humbert. Paul Gabriël went to Kleve, just over the German border, to study with the landscape painter Barend Cornelis Koekkoek. Jozef Israëls, unsatisfied with the academies at Groningen and Amsterdam, left for Paris to attend classes at the studio of François-Édouard Picot. Jacob Maris left the Hague Academy for the corresponding institution in Antwerp and from there he went to study with Ernest Hébert in Paris. His brother Matthijs Maris studied with Nicaise de Keyser in Antwerp. Hendrik Willem Mesdag left Groningen to perfect his skills in Brussels under Willem Roelofs. He also received additional instructions from Lawrence Alma-Tadema, who would later move to England.

== Oosterbeek and Barbizon ==
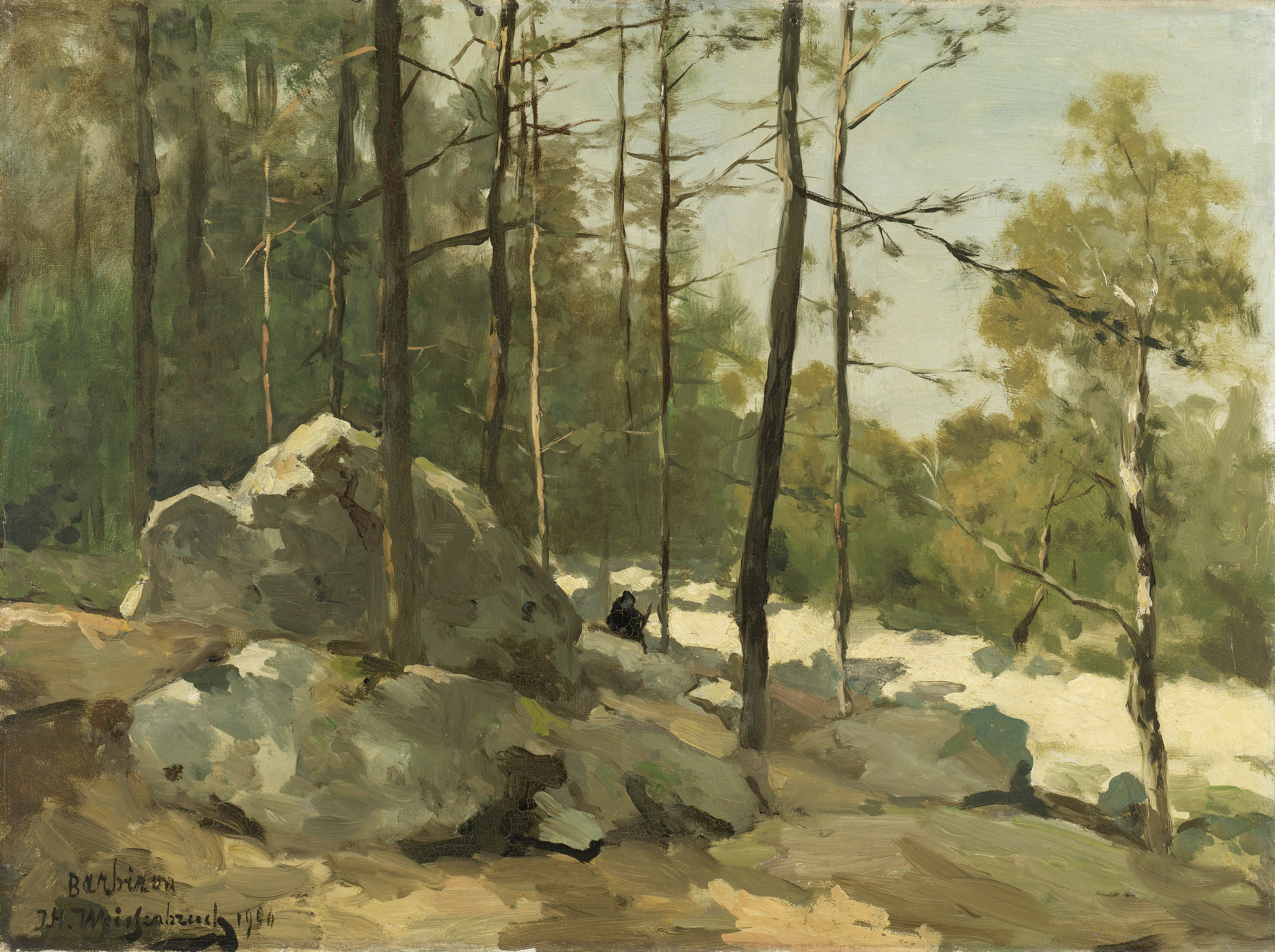
Forest View near Barbizon (1900) by Jan Hendrik Weissenbruch

In the 1830s artists like Théodore Rousseau, Jean-François Millet, Charles-François Daubigny, and Jean-Baptiste-Camille Corot found their way to Barbizon, a forested area near Fontainebleau. The emphasis of their work here was on painting nature as they saw it - Barbizon was not a school but a community of artists. This gave rise to the well-known Barbizon School and their example was followed in the 1850s by a few Dutch painters who gathered in Oosterbeek in order to work in the surrounding countryside.

These painters had been influenced by the artists of the Barbizon School and emulated them by registering their impressions with rapid strokes of colour. Johannes Warnardus Bilders, father of Gerard Bilders, moved to Oosterbeek in 1852 and attracted many pupils: Anton Mauve, a cousin-in-law of Vincent van Gogh, the Maris brothers (Jacob, Willem and Matthijs) in the summer, as well as the regular visitors Willem Roelofs and Paul Gabriël. Some of these artists, such as Jozef Israëls, Jacob Maris, and Jan Hendrik Weissenbruch visited Barbizon to paint there.

== The Hague and Düsseldorf ==
There was a slight connection between the "Düsseldorf Art Association" when an exhibition on "Fishing in Scheveningen" occurred. It concerned such artists as Carl Hilgers, Hermann Mevius, Carl Adloff and Andreas Achenbach.

The call of the Düsseldorf painters' school attracted artists of the Hague school, such Johannes Bosboom and J. W. Bilders. At the beginning of his career Jozef Israëls went on a study trip to Düsseldorf. Also Julius van de Sande Bakhuyzen and Philip Sadée came to Düsseldorf. The Düsseldorf academy was famous as a training centre for her scenery and histories painting. The bright colour order which distinguishes those paintings is unmistakable.

== Hague School ==
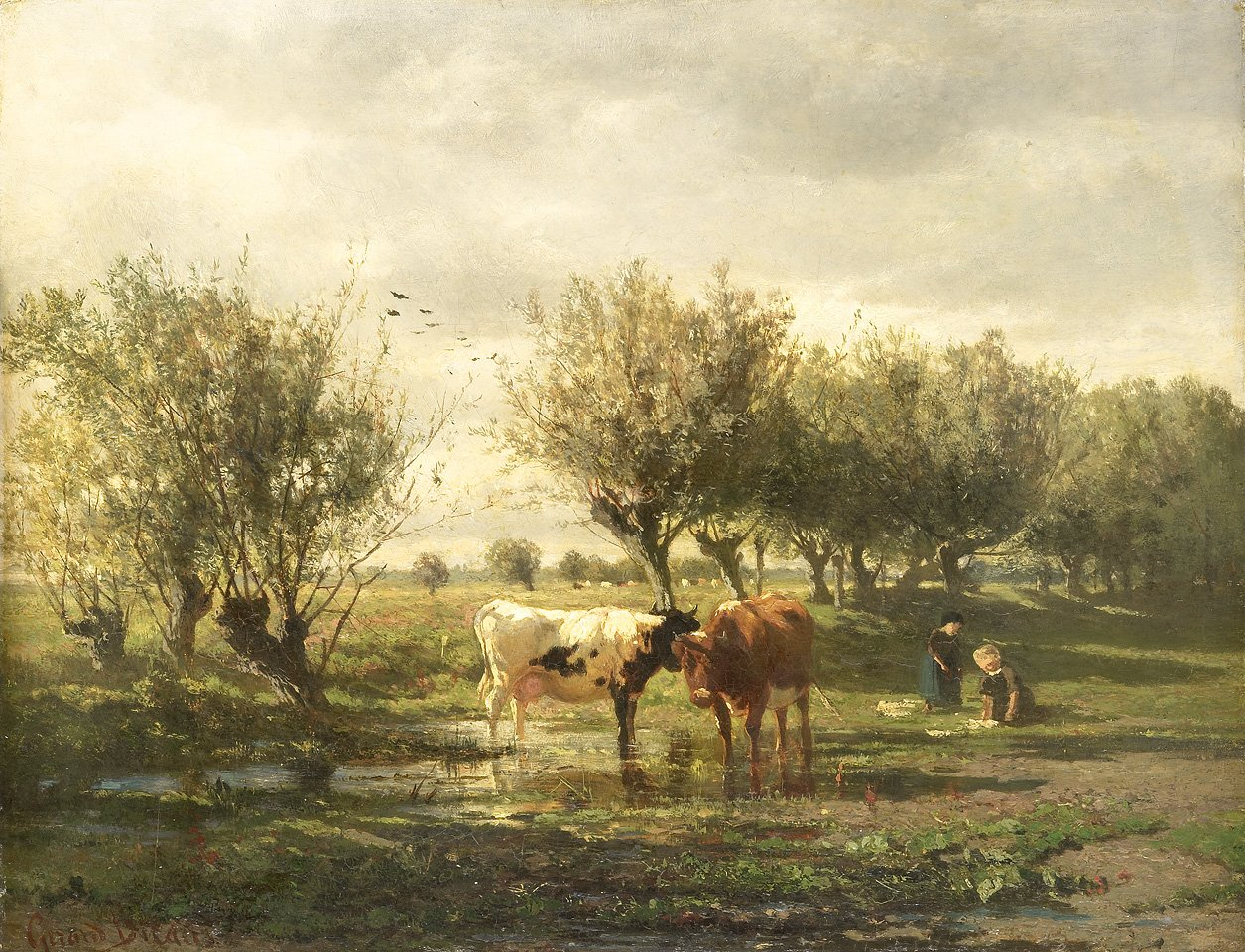
Cows at a Pond by Gerard Bilders

Gerard Bilders had been seeking something of the kind in his own work, but on visiting the national Exhibition in Brussels in 1860, he found what he had been looking for: a colored gray tonality, or as he put it "the impression of a warm, fragrant gray." The muted tones and warm gray that Bilders found here was certainly discussed with his friends in Oosterbeek and found its way into the work of the young Hague School painters.

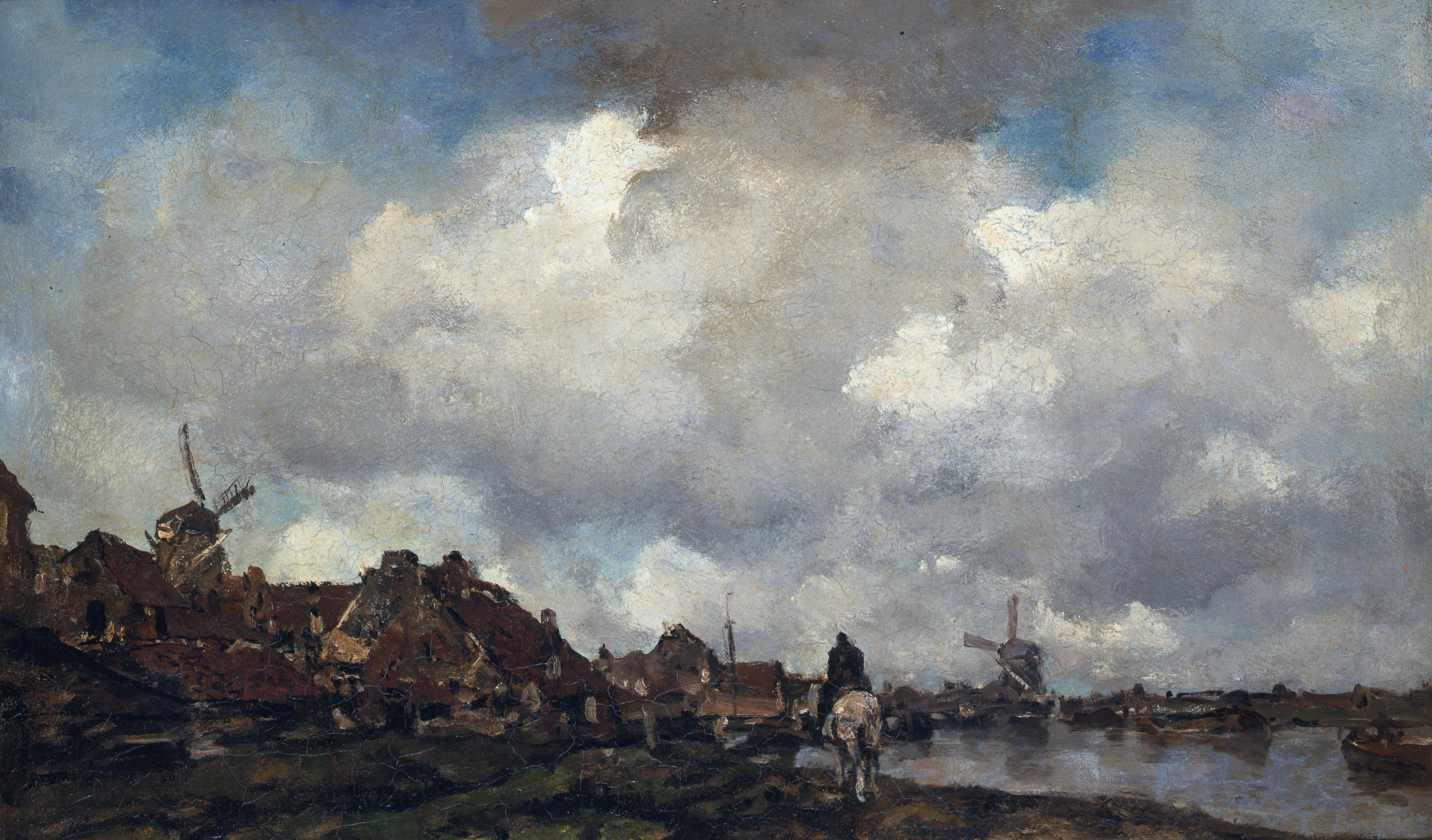
Village near Schiedam by Jacob Maris

The migration of these artists to The Hague began in the late 1860s. Hendrik Willem Mesdag was the first, moving there in 1869. Jacob Maris returned to The Hague in 1870 after the family's experience in Paris in the Franco-Prussian War. That same year, Jozef Israëls came to The Hague, as did Anton Mauve. Willem Maris, Johannes Bosboom and Weissenbruch had always lived there. For Mesdag, the move marked the end of his student days in Brussels. For Maris, it meant a break with the Paris dealers, who would not let him paint what he wanted. Friendship played an important role in this group of painters and whenever one of them was invited to take part in a major exhibition, he would arrange for his friends to also submit work. The outside world was thus presented with a picture of a united artistic and stylised front. The grey tonality was to become one of the characteristics of the Hague School.

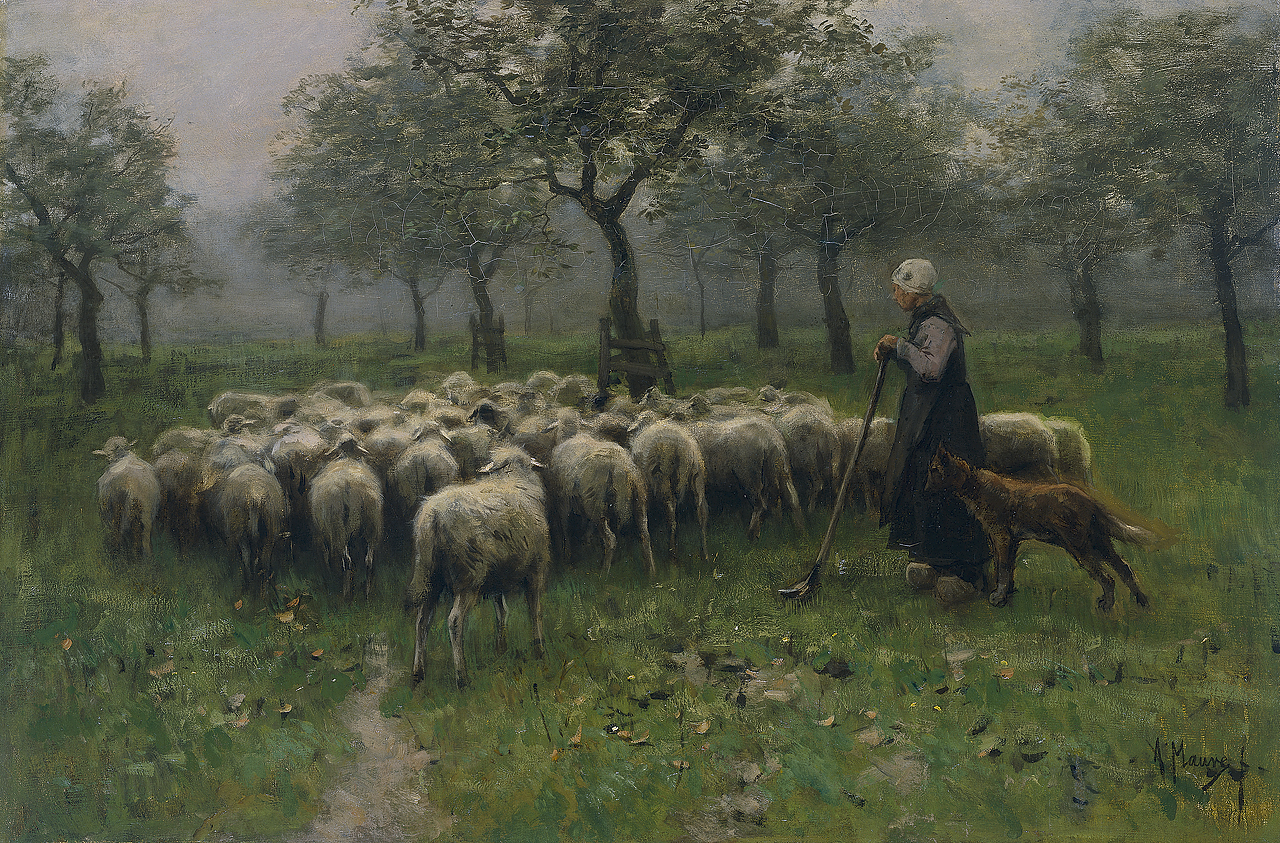
Shepherdess With a Flock of Sheep by Anton Mauve

The name "Hague School" was coined in 1875 by a critic, Jacob van Santen Kolff, who used the phrases "a new way of seeing and depicting things", "intent to convey mood, tone takes precedence over colour", "almost exclusive preference for so-called 'bad weather' effects", and "grey mood." The Hague School artists were less interested in a faithful portrayal of what they saw than in conveying the atmosphere and impression of the moment. They painted mostly in subdued colours, with a penchant for grey. That is why the Hague School is sometimes also called the Gray School.

The painters of the Hague School conducted some of their artistic discussions as member of the Pulchri Studio, which had been founded in 1847 by Bosboom, Willem Roelofs, and J. H. Weissenbruch at the home on the Lange Voorhout of the Hague painter Lambertus Hardenberg. Growing discontent among the young artists in The Hague about the apparently insufficient opportunities for training and development was the reason for establishing the Pulchri Studio. Many members of the Hague School served on the board of the Pulchri Studio, so that the society became a bastion of the school for many years.

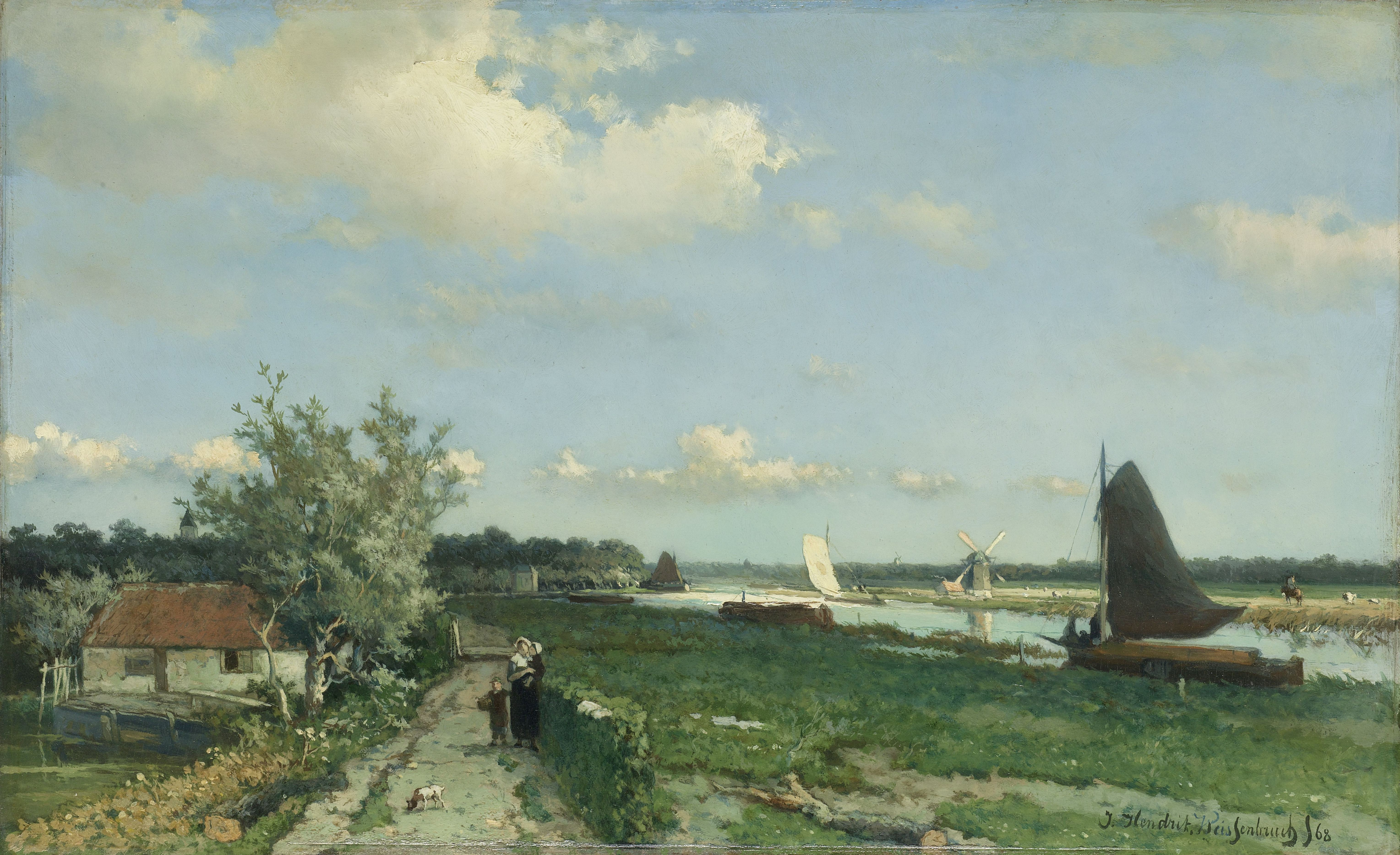
The Shipping Canal at Rijswijk by Jan Hendrik Weissenbruch.

Over the years, the artists of the Hague School changed. Jacob Maris enriched his palette with vivid brushwork, especially in his Amsterdam town views. Jozef Israëls had completely abandoned his anecdotal manner and sombre colouring. J. H. Weissenbruch blurred the details in his later work, painting beach scenes and landscapes in magnificently conceived planes of colour with an almost abstract quality. Willem Maris became the painter of light he had always tried to be, producing summer meadows with sunlight sparkling on the water and cattle—the quintessence of the Dutch landscape. Matthijis Maris' further development was also remarkable, albeit tragic. Despite the support of family and friends, he led a solitary existence. He worked for years on his paintings of brides and portraits of children, which became increasingly hazy and dreamy until finally becoming completely detached from reality.

== Sequel ==
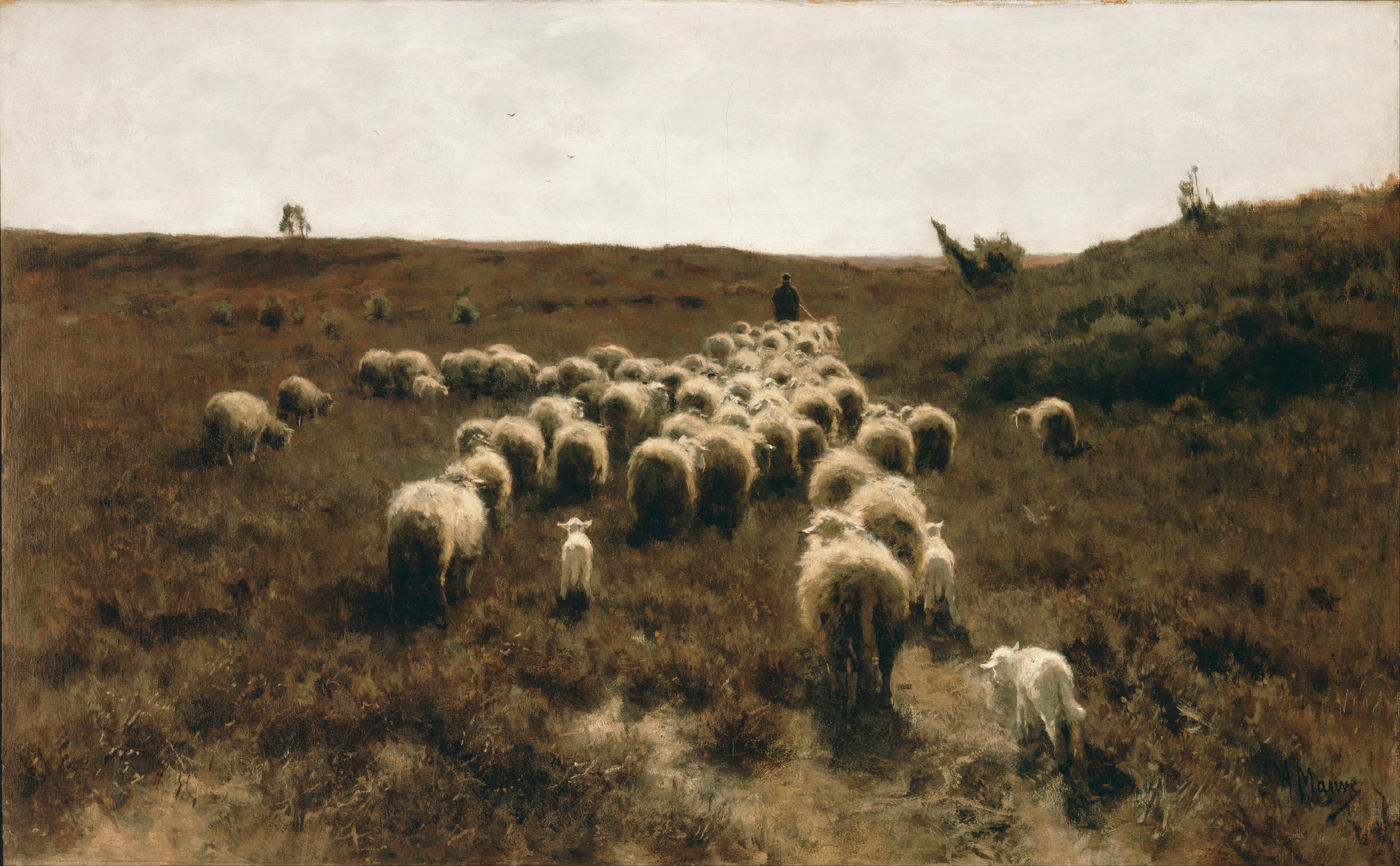
The Return of the Flock at Laren by Anton Mauve.

By the mid-1880s the united front of the Hague School began to crumble. The character of the city of The Hague changed as it became larger. The small fishing village of Scheveningen changed as new suburbs were built and factories transformed the area. Weissenbruch and Roelofs found The Hague to be growing too fast and retreated to the polders to continue painting.

Anton Mauve and Jozef Israëls became active in the Laren School which perpetuated aspects of the Hague School. Albert Neuhuys, Hein Kever, and Evert Pieters, were especially active there between 1880 and 1900. Realistic interiors of Laren farm houses, as well as plein air landscapes were the preferred subjects of the paintings. Anton Mauve was particularly active in the latter and his views of the heathlands were quite popular with US art lovers.

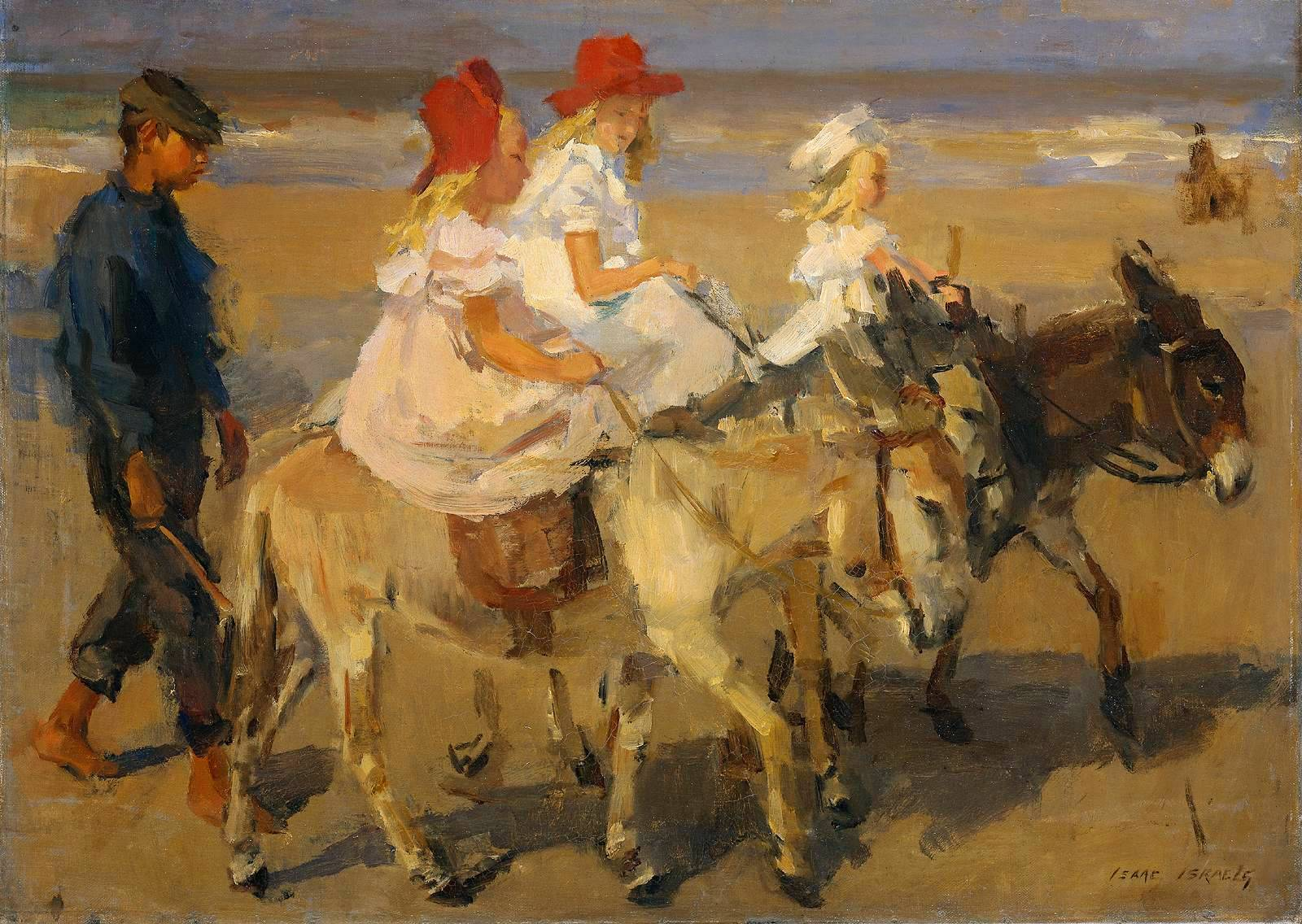
Donkeyride by Isaac Israëls.

While The Hague was becoming too large for some, it was too small for others who became influential in the Amsterdam Impressionism group which developed there. This movement drew on city life for its subject matter, although the contrast with the Hague School was less pronounced than is occasionally suggested. This group included some who are designated below as members of the second generation of the Hague School such as George Hendrik Breitner, Isaac Israëls (son of Jozef Israëls), Willem Bastiaan Tholen and Willem de Zwart (also known as William Black). In addition, Willem Witsen, Floris Verster, Jan Hillebrand Wijsmuller, and Jan Toorop have some background with the Hague School and are considered to be in the Amsterdam Impressionism movement.

Although not usually associated with the Hague School, Johan Jongkind was called a forerunner of impressionism who influenced Eugène Boudin, who later was mentor to Claude Monet. Others who had at least a tangential connections with the artists of the Hague School are Charles Rochussen, Richard Bisschop, and Lawrence Alma-Tadema.

Around the 1890s in France, impressionism was followed by post-impressionism, which places greater emphasis on the form, structure and content of the painting. This movement, too, was picked up in the Netherlands, resulting in a Dutch post-impressionism and introducing abstract elements and cubism into modern painting. Famous examples are Vincent van Gogh, who received his first art training from Anton Mauve, as well as Piet Mondriaan, who initially painted in the manner of the Hague School and then in a variety of styles and techniques documenting his search for a personal style.

== Representatives ==
Forerunners
- Bilders, Johannes Warnardus (1811–1890)
- Koekkoek, Barend Cornelis (1803–1862)
- Schelfhout, Andreas (1787–1830)
- Van de Sande Bakhuysen, Hendrik (1795–1860)
- Van Hove, Bartholomeus (1790–1880)
- Van Hove, Hubertus (1819–1865)
- Jacob Jan van der Maaten (1820–1879)
- Charles Rochussen, (1814–1894)
- Van Os, Pieter Frederik (1808–1892)
- Waldorp, Anthonie (1803–1866)
First generation
- Artz, David Adolph Constant (1837–1890)
- Bilders, Gerard (1838–1865)
- Bosboom, Johannes (1817–1891)
- De Haas, Johannes Hubertus Leonardus (1832–1908)
- Gabriël, Paul Joseph Constantin (1828–1903)
- Israëls, Jozef (1824–1911)
- Maris, Jacob (1837–1899)
- Maris, Matthijs (1839–1917)
- Maris, Willem (1844–1910)
- Mauve, Anton (1838–1888)
- Mesdag, Hendrik Willem (1831–1915)
- Mesdag, Taco (1822–1902)
- Mesdag-van Houten, Sina (1834–1909)
- Roelofs, Willem (1822–1897)
- Weissenbruch, Jan Hendrik (1824–1903)
Second generation
- Akkeringa, Johannes Evert Hendrik (1861–1942)
- Arntzenius, Floris (1864–1925)
- Blommers, Bernard J. (1845–1914)
- Breitner, George Hendrik (1857–1923)
- De Bock, Théophile (1851–1904)
- De Hoog, Bernard (1866–1943)
- De Zwart, Willem (1862–1931)
- Israëls, Isaac (1865–1934)
- Koning, Arnold Hendrik (1860-1945)
- Neuhuys, Albert (1844–1914)
- Poggenbeek, George Jan Hendik (Geo)
- Sadée, Philip (1837–1904)
- Tholen, Willem Bastiaan (1860–1931)
- Van de Sande Bakhuyzen, Julius (1835–1925)
- Van der Voort in de Betouw, Herman Jacob (1847–1902)
- Van der Weele, Herman Johannes (1852–1930)
- Van Houten, Gerrit (1866–1934)
- Van Rappard, Anthon (1858–1892)
- Wijsmuller, Jan Hillebrand (1855–1925)
- Adrianus Hendrikus "Arie" "Jacques" Witjens (1881 - 1956)

== Gallery of the important forerunners ==
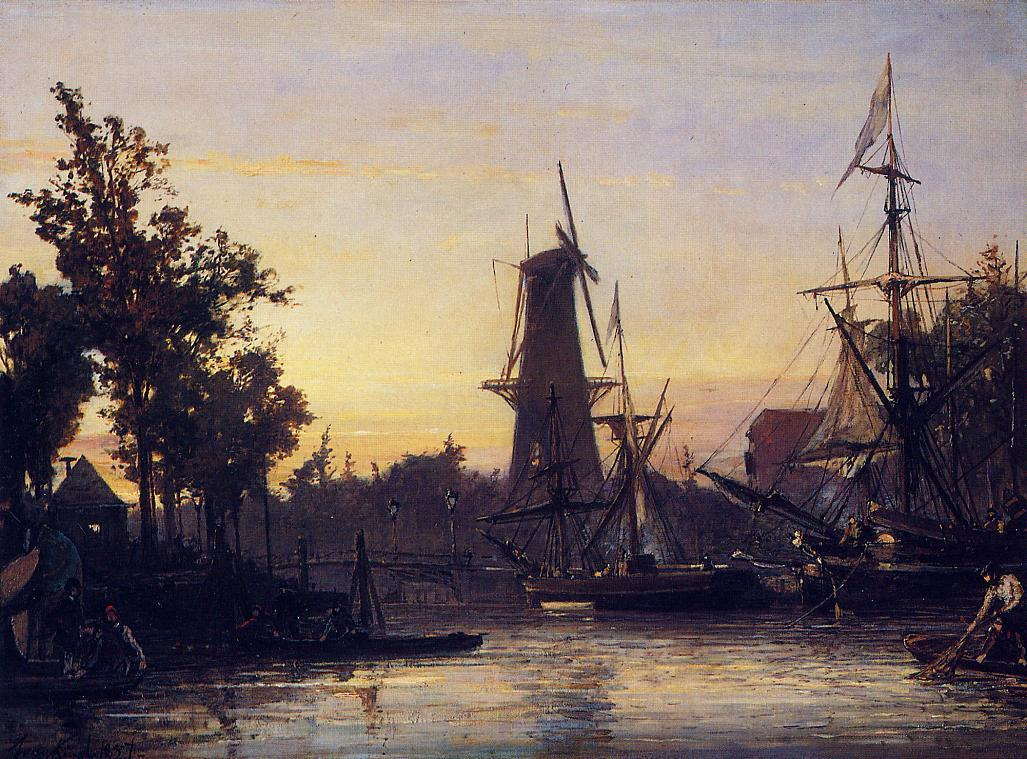
Jongkind Johan Berthold (1857): Binneshaven Rotterdam, private collection.

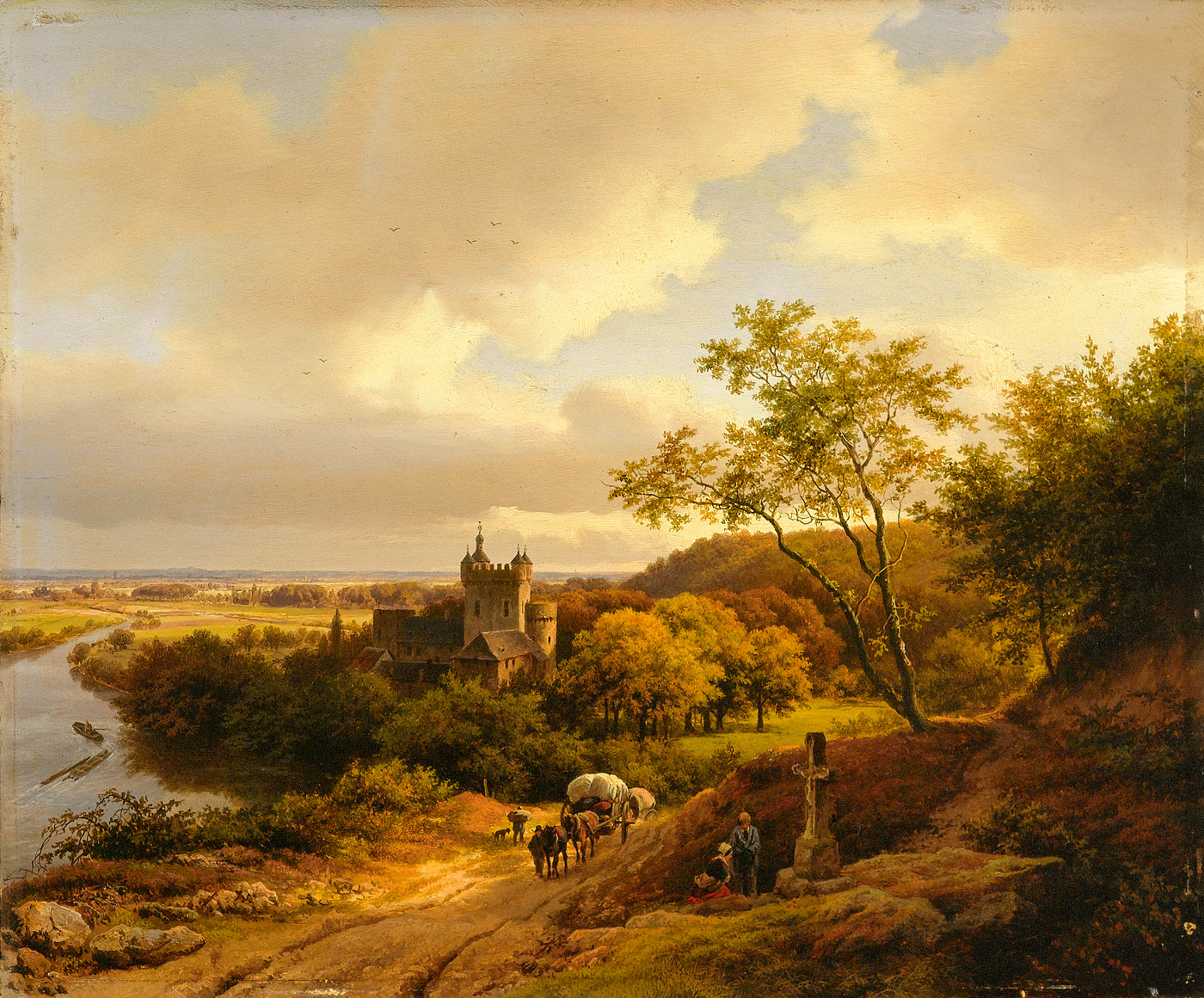
Barend Cornelis Koekkoek (1845): Een kasteel tussen bomen aan een rivier-'Een kasteel tusschen geboomte aan eene rivier, Amsterdam Museum.

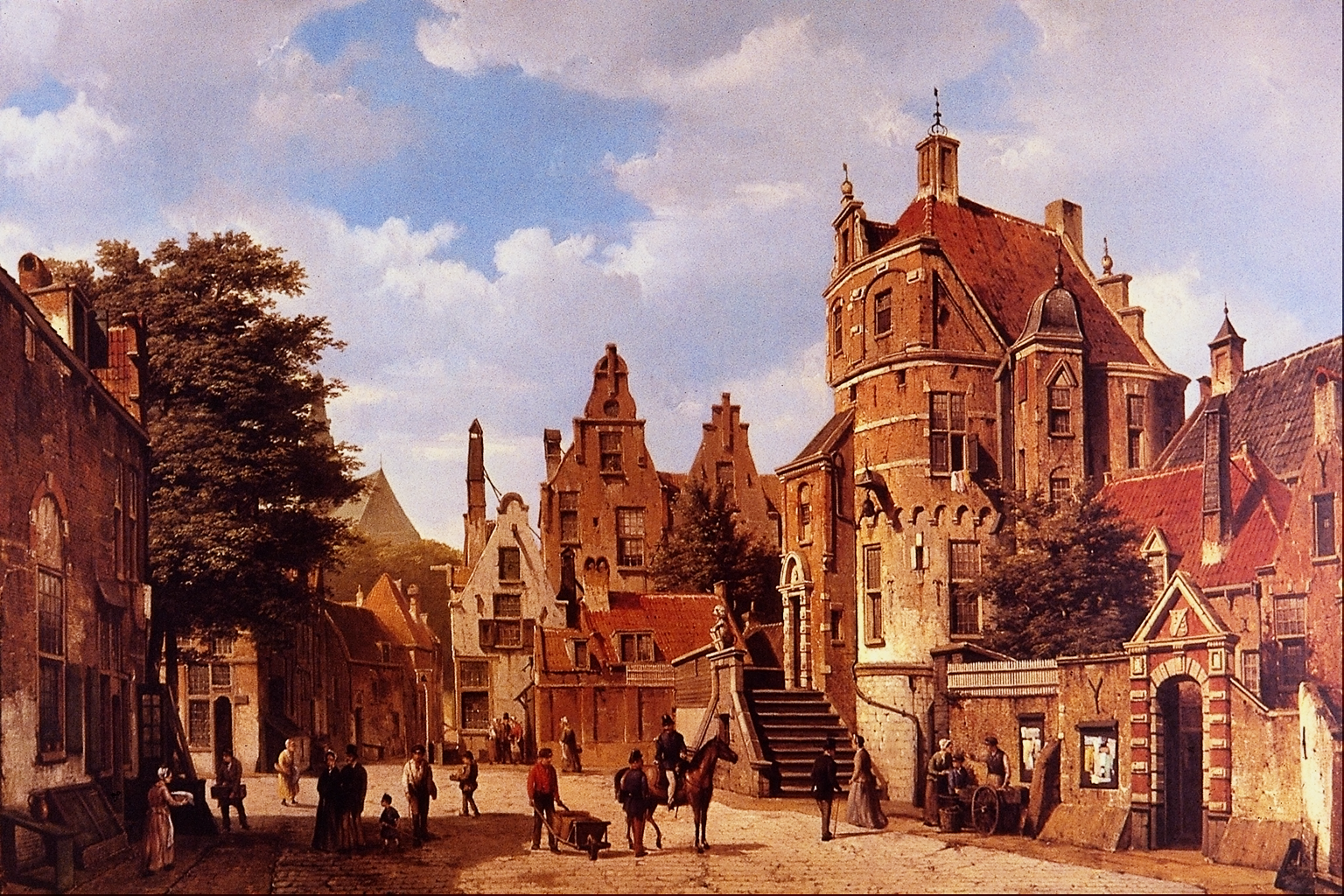
Barend Cornelis Koekkoek (undated): Old Amsterdam, private collection.

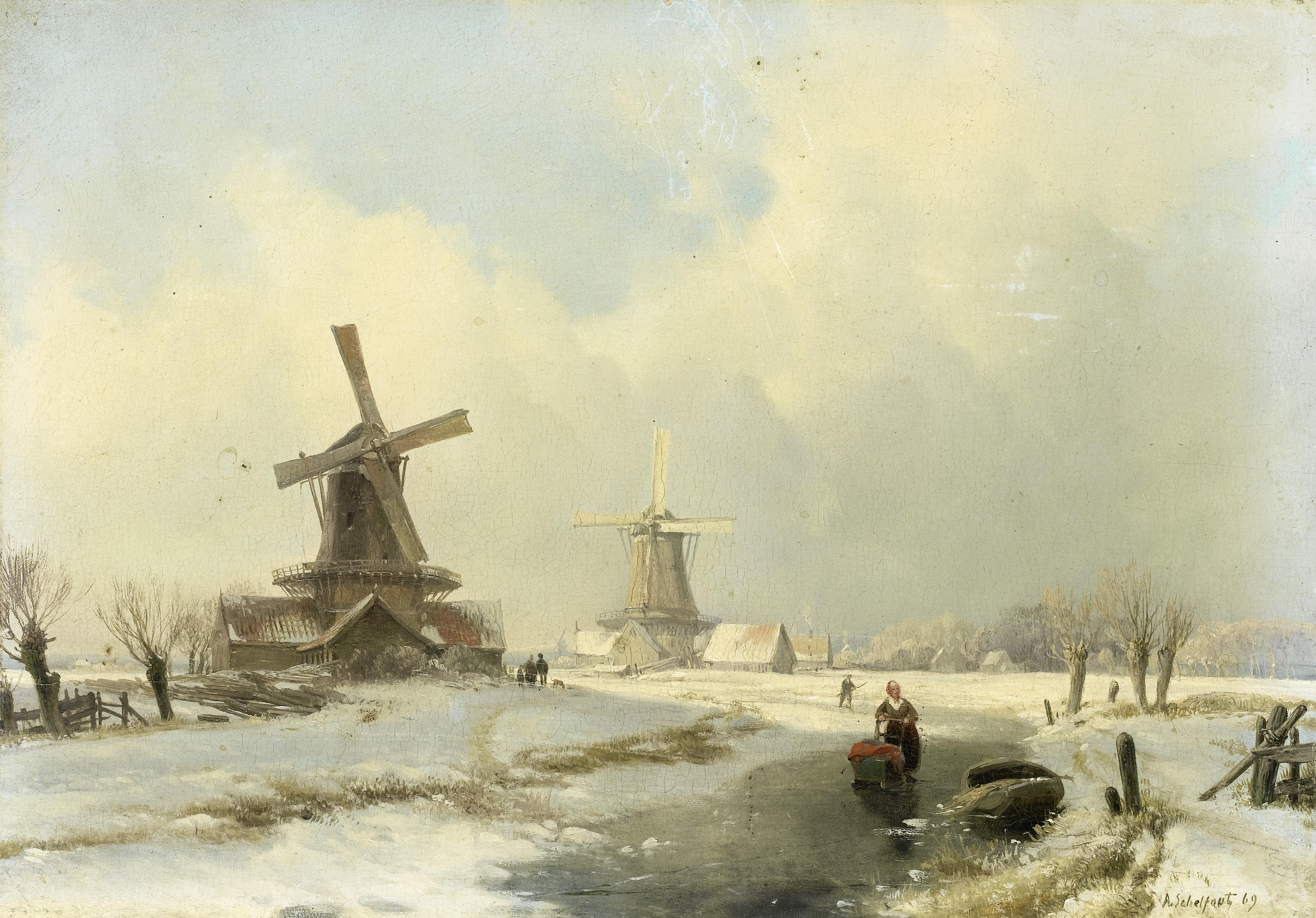
Andreas Schelfhout (1869): Winterlandschap met twee windmolens, private collection.

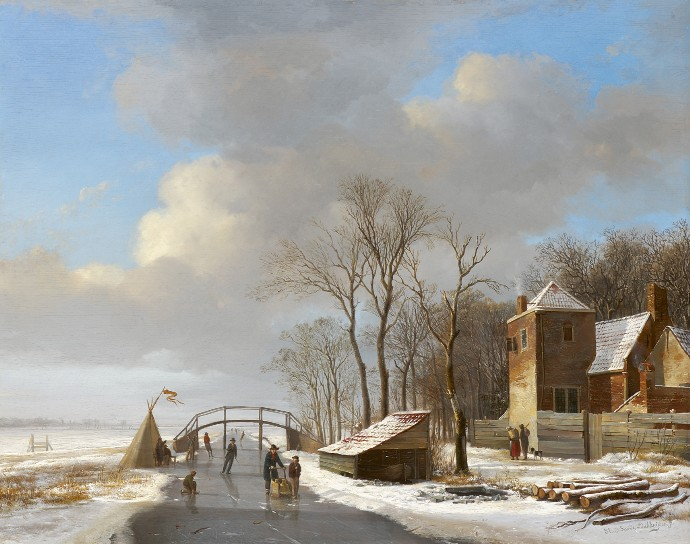
Hendrik van de Sande Bakhuyzen (1820): Besneeuwd polderlandschap met schaatsers, private collection.

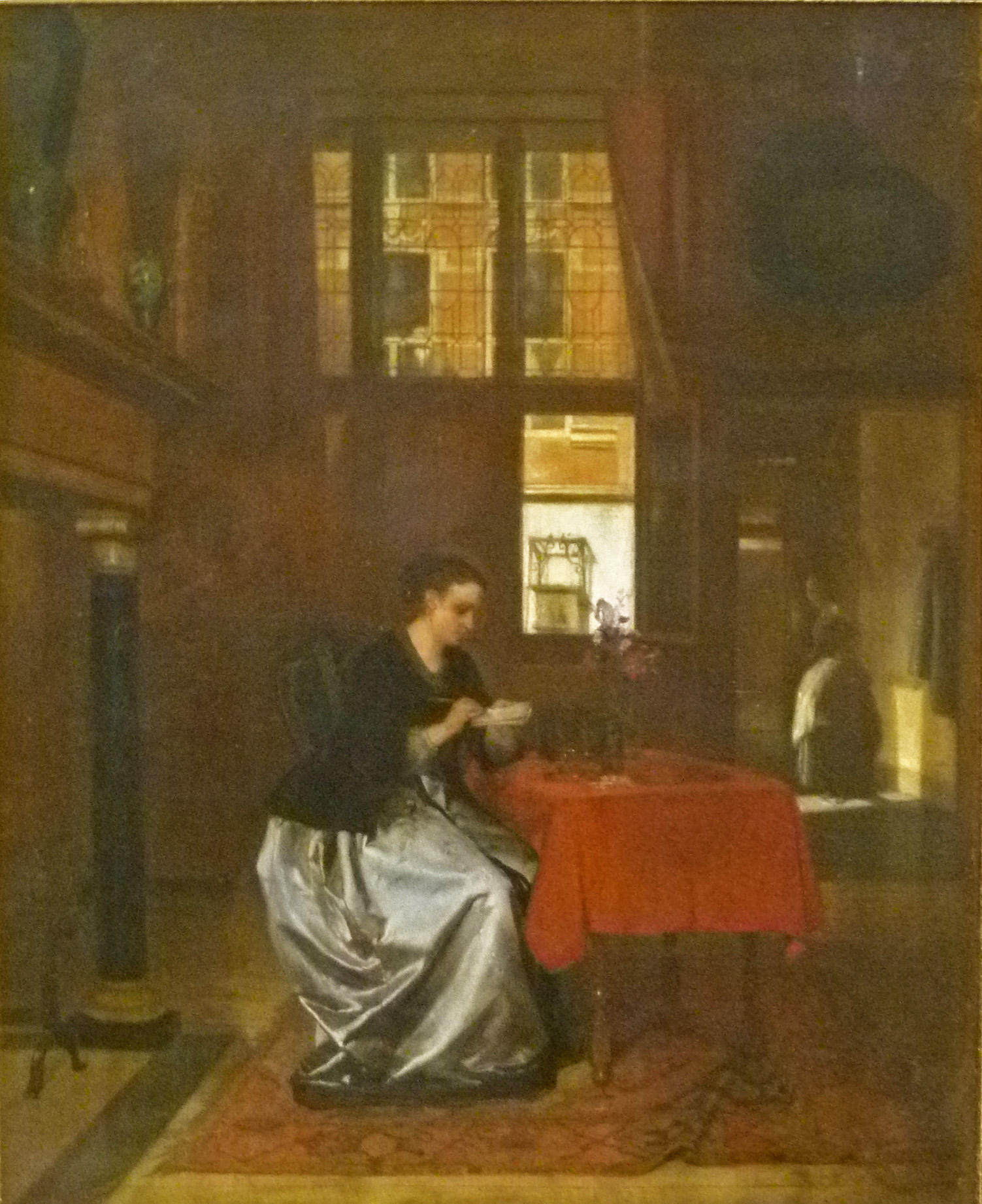
Hubert Van Hove (1865): Elegante dame in interieur, private collection.

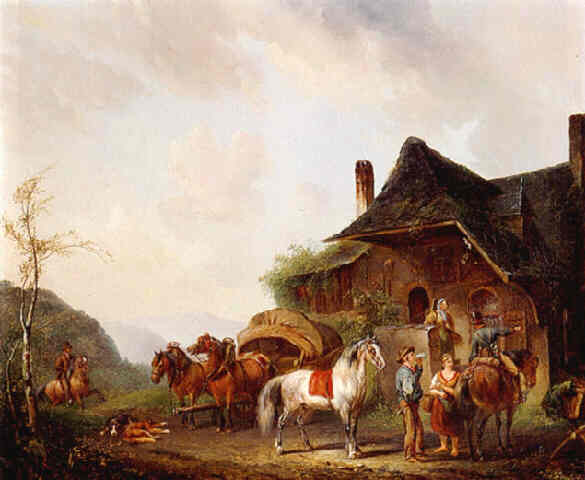
Pieter van Os (undated): Horsemen and travellers outside an inn, private collection.

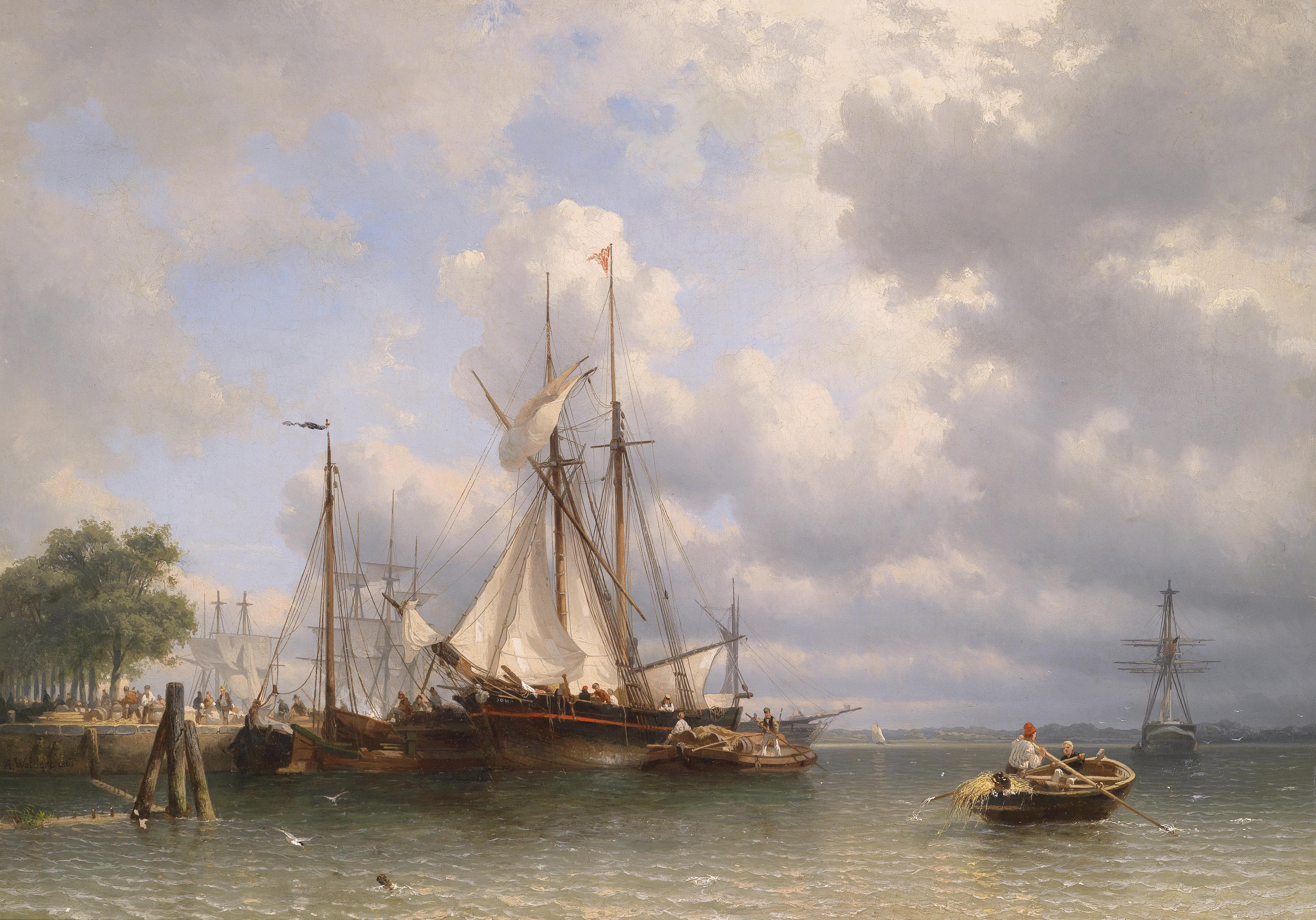
Antonie Waldorp (1862): Segelschiffe im Hafen, private collections.

== Gallery of the first generation ==
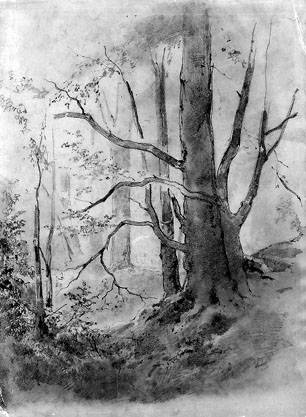
Gerhard Bilders (undated): Boesgezicht, Bijzondere Collecties, Universiteit Leiden.

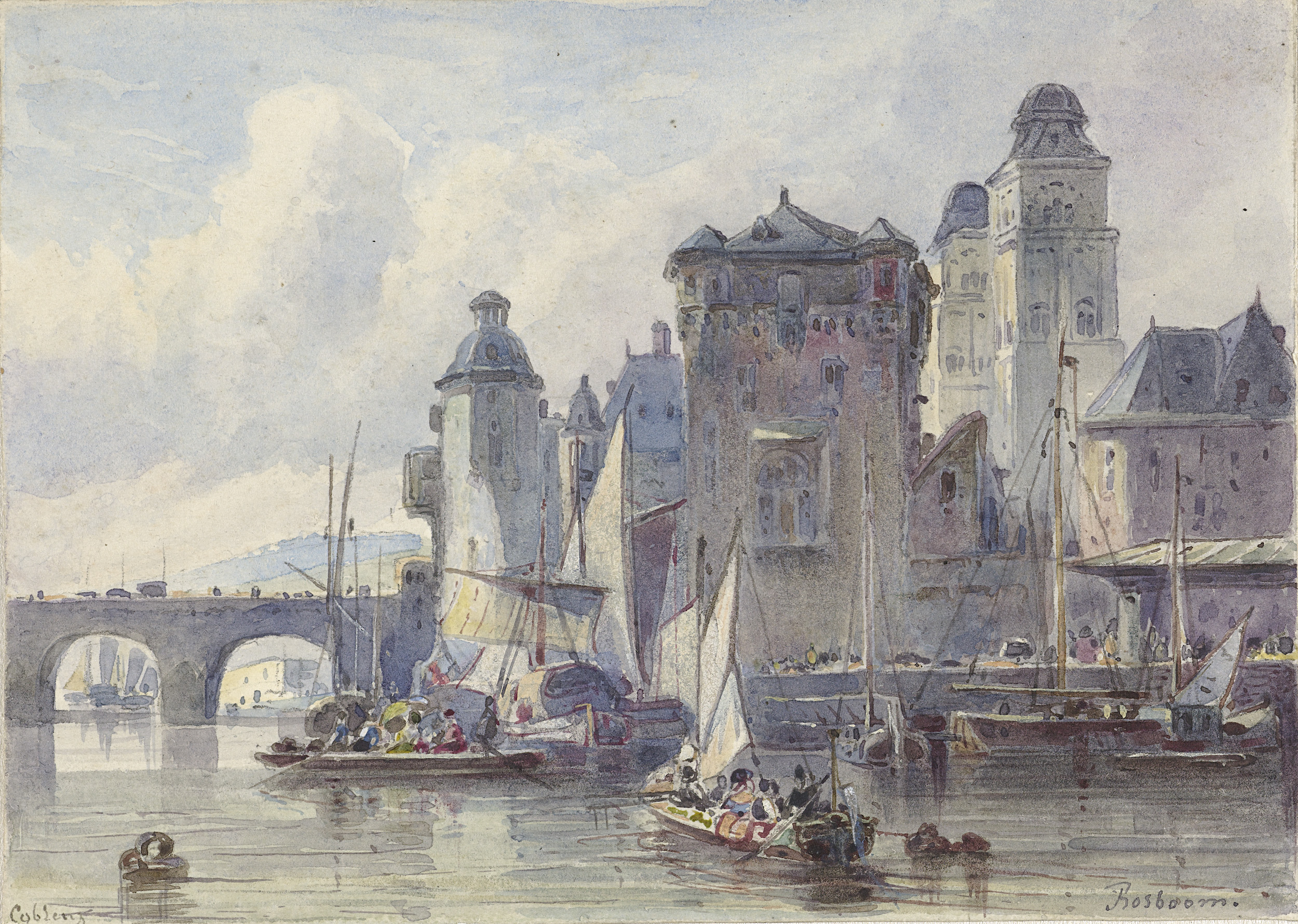
Johannes Bosboom (after 1827): Face of Koblenz, Rijksmuseum Amsterdam.

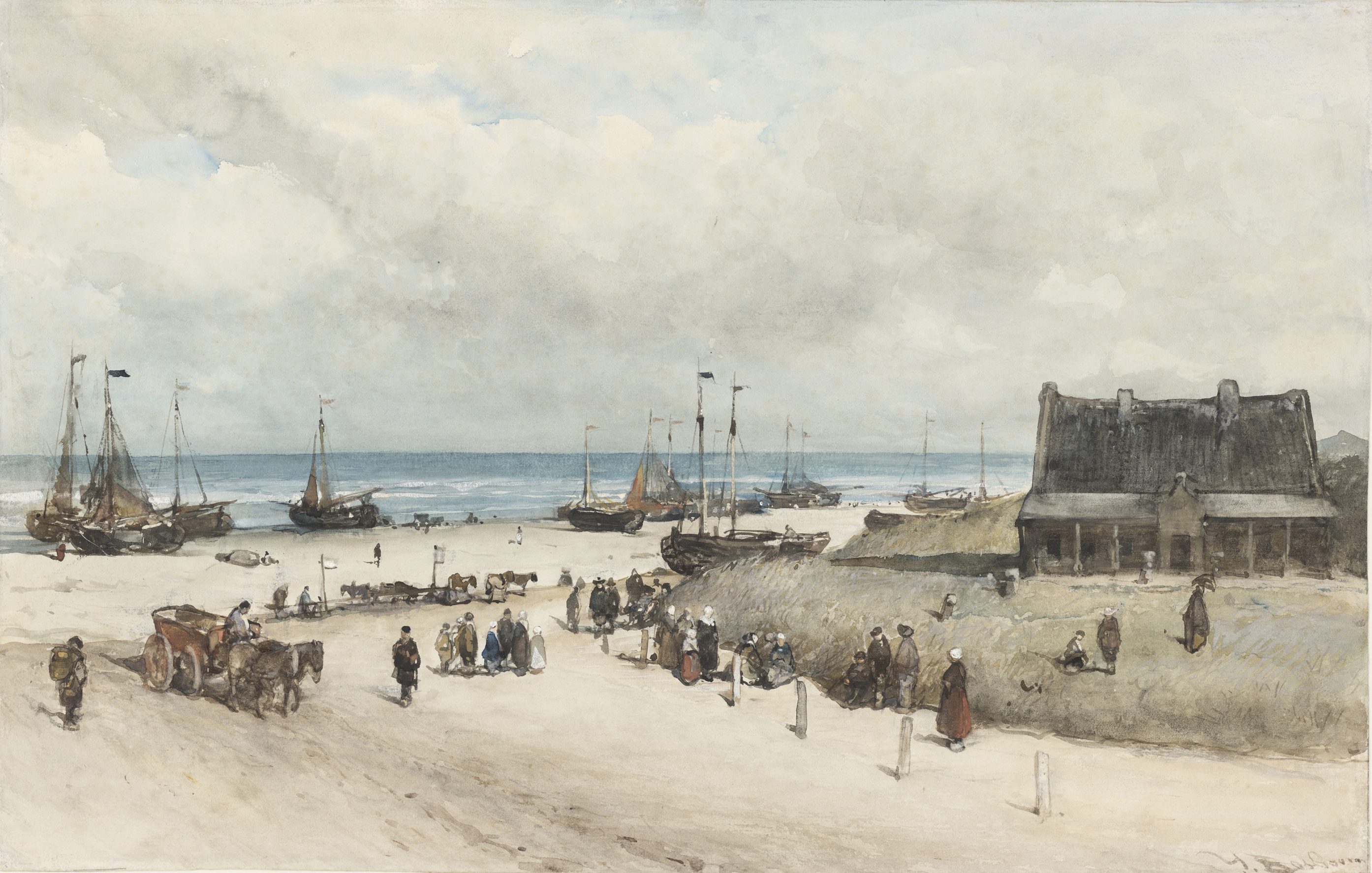
Johannes Bosboom (1873): The beach of Scheveningen, Rijksmuseum Amsterdam.

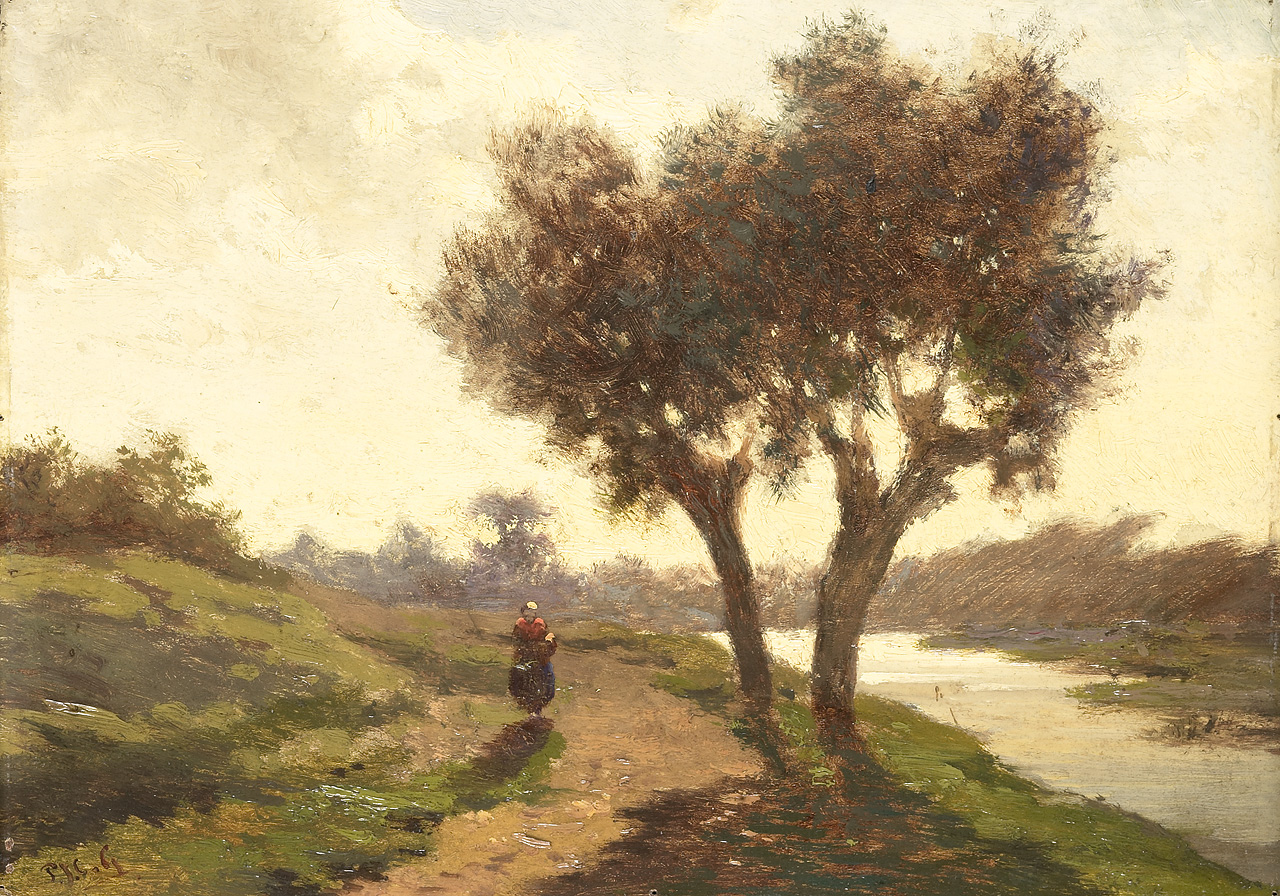
Paul Gabriël (1860/67): Landscape with two trees, Rijksmuseum Amsterdam.

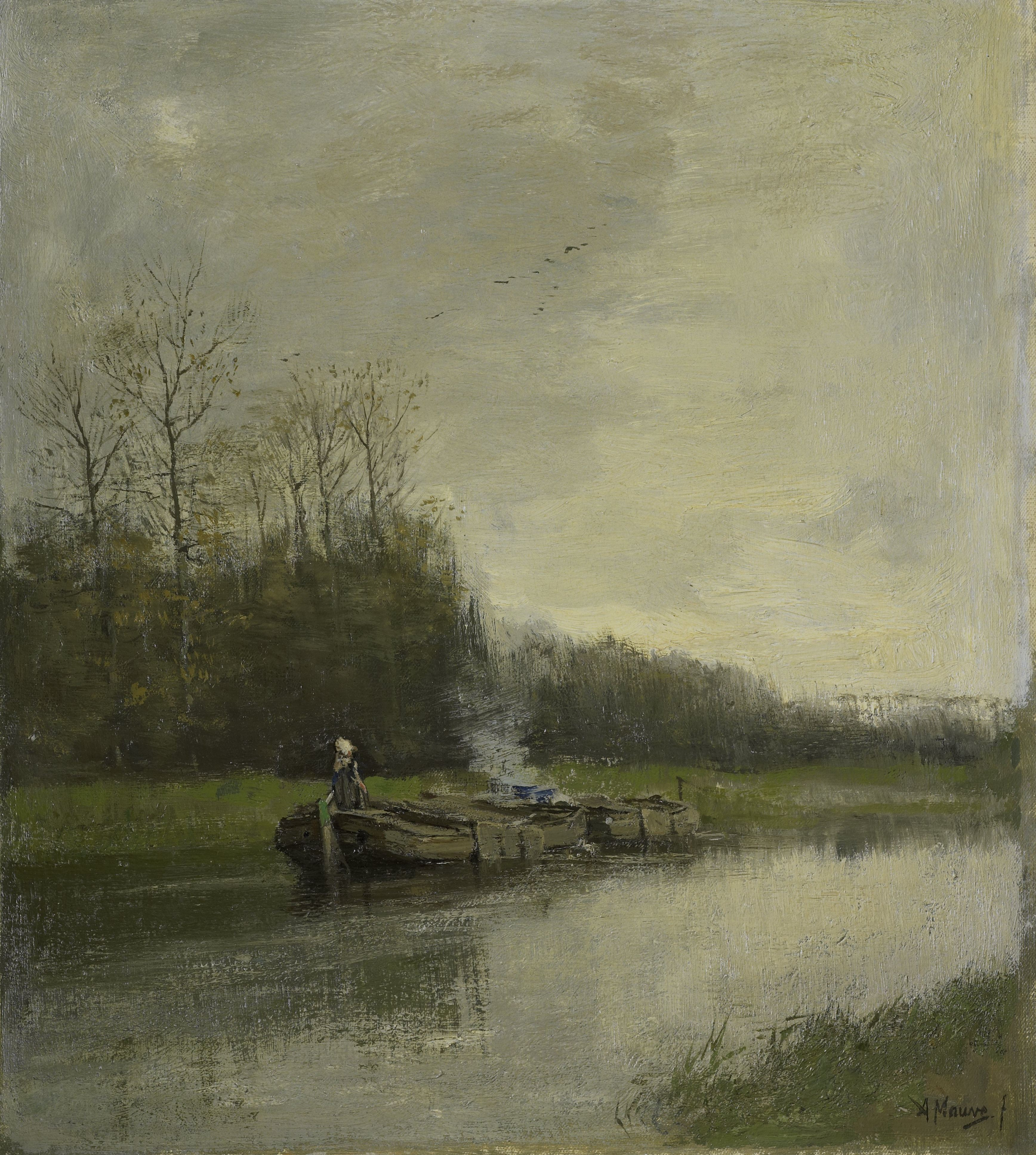
Anton Mauve (after 1860): Trekvaart, Rijksmuseum Amsterdam.

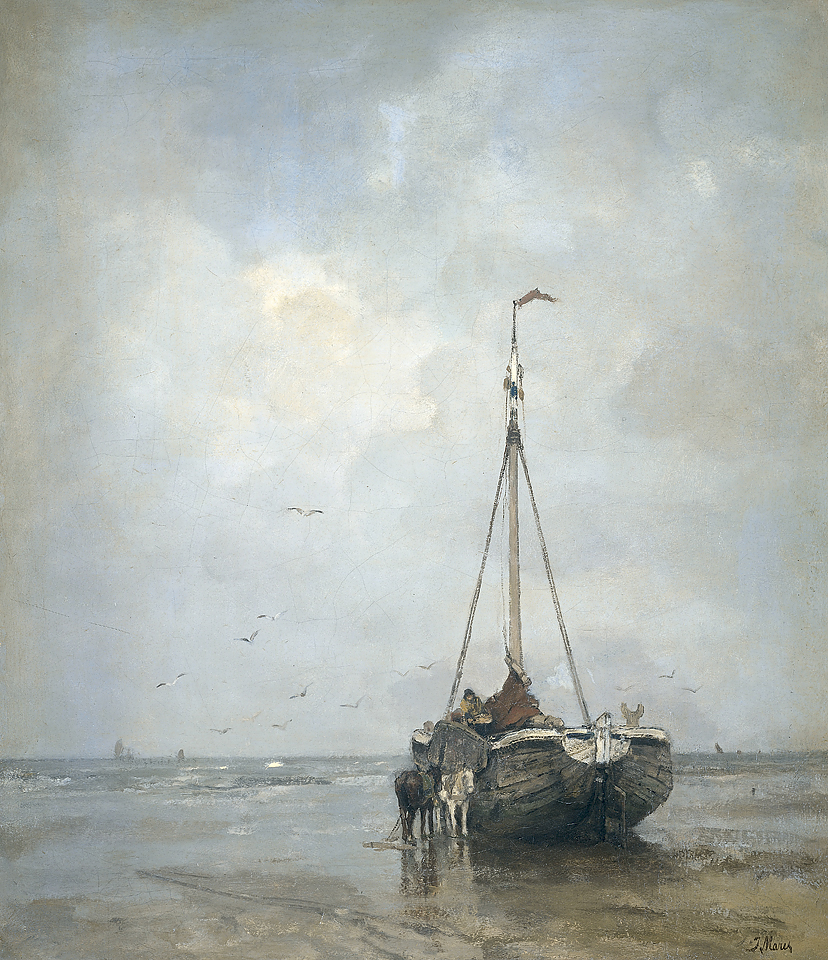
Jacob Maris (1880-1899): Bomschuit op het Scheveningse strand, Rijksmuseum. Amsterdam

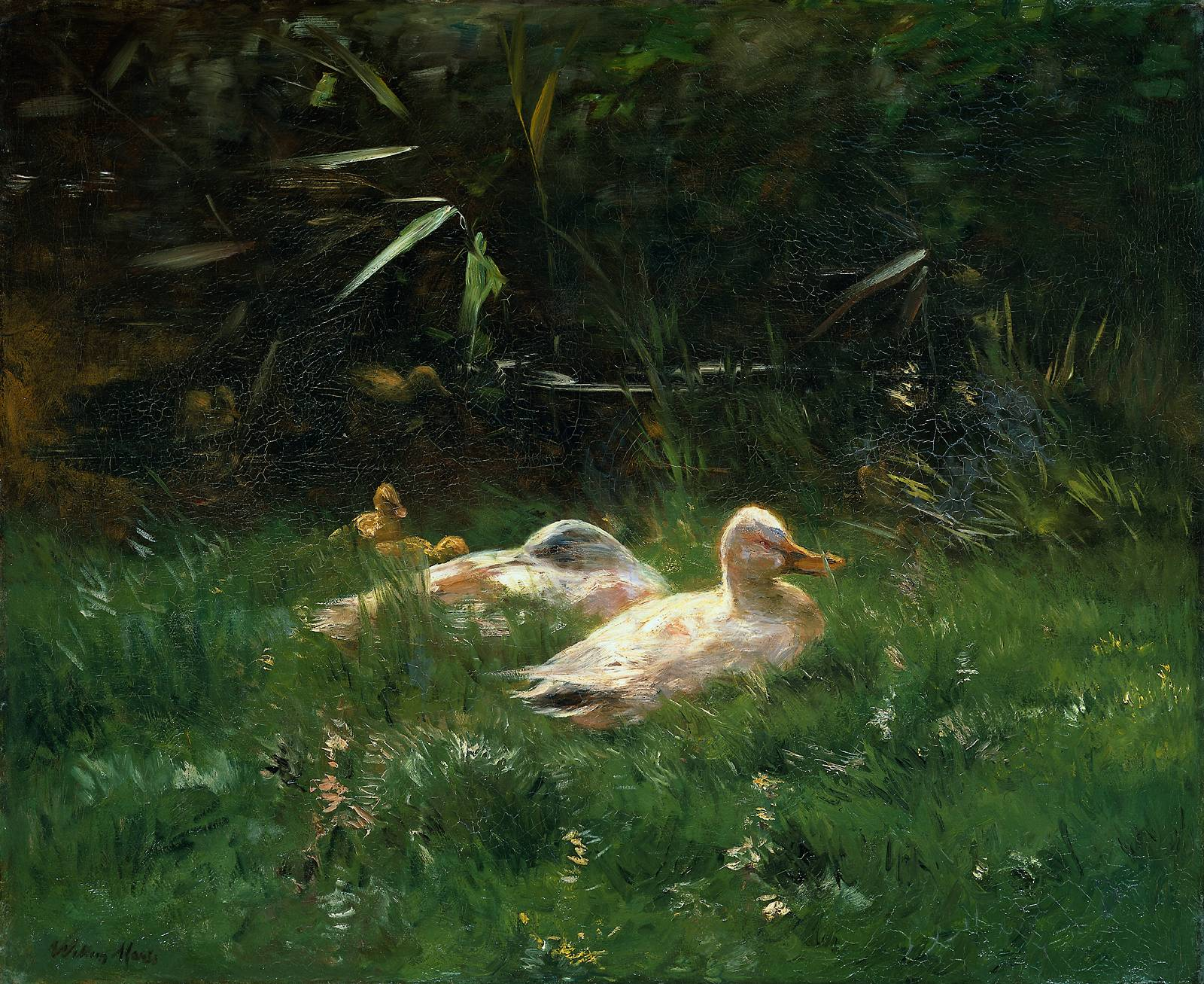
Willem Maris: Ducks, Rijksmuseum, Amsterdam

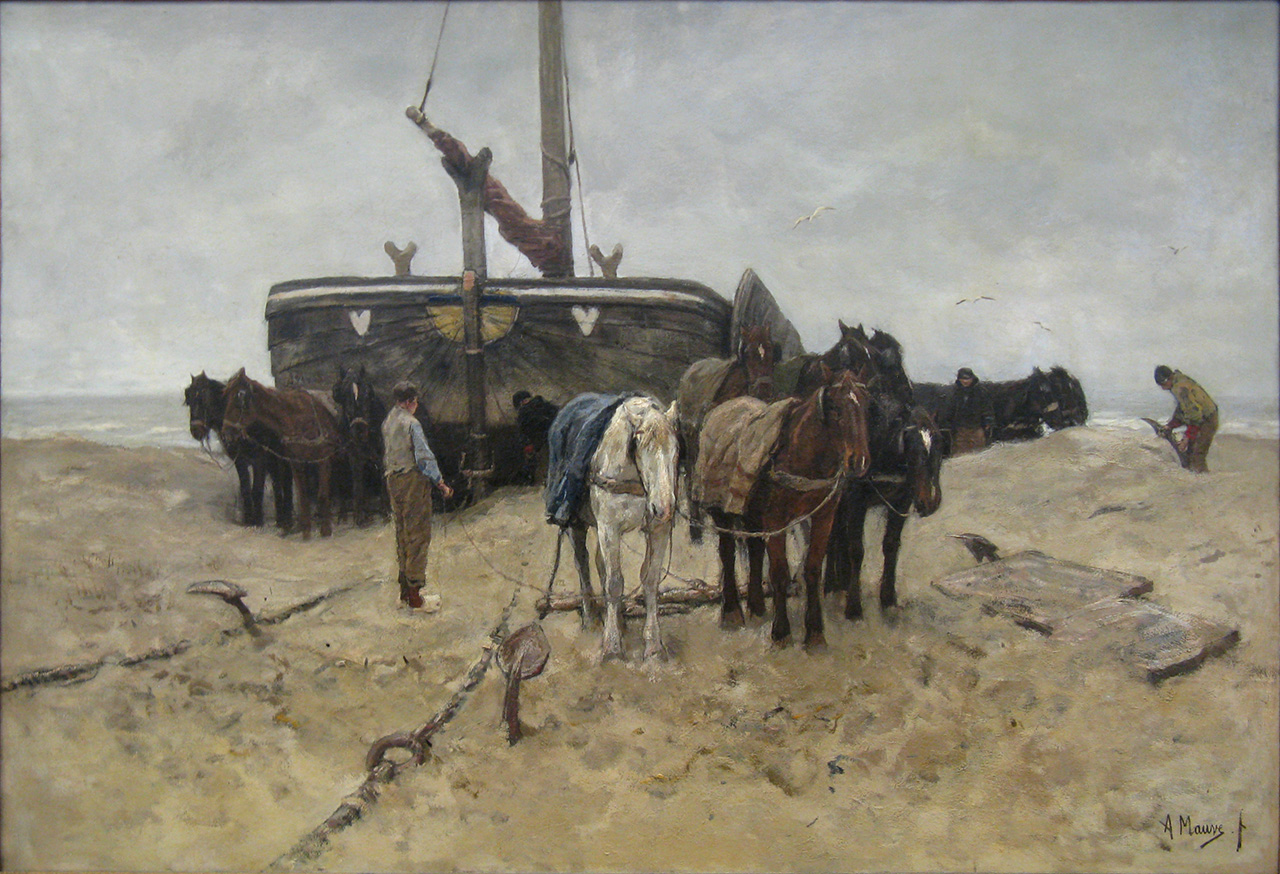
Anton Mauve (after 1882): Bomschuit op het strand, private collection.

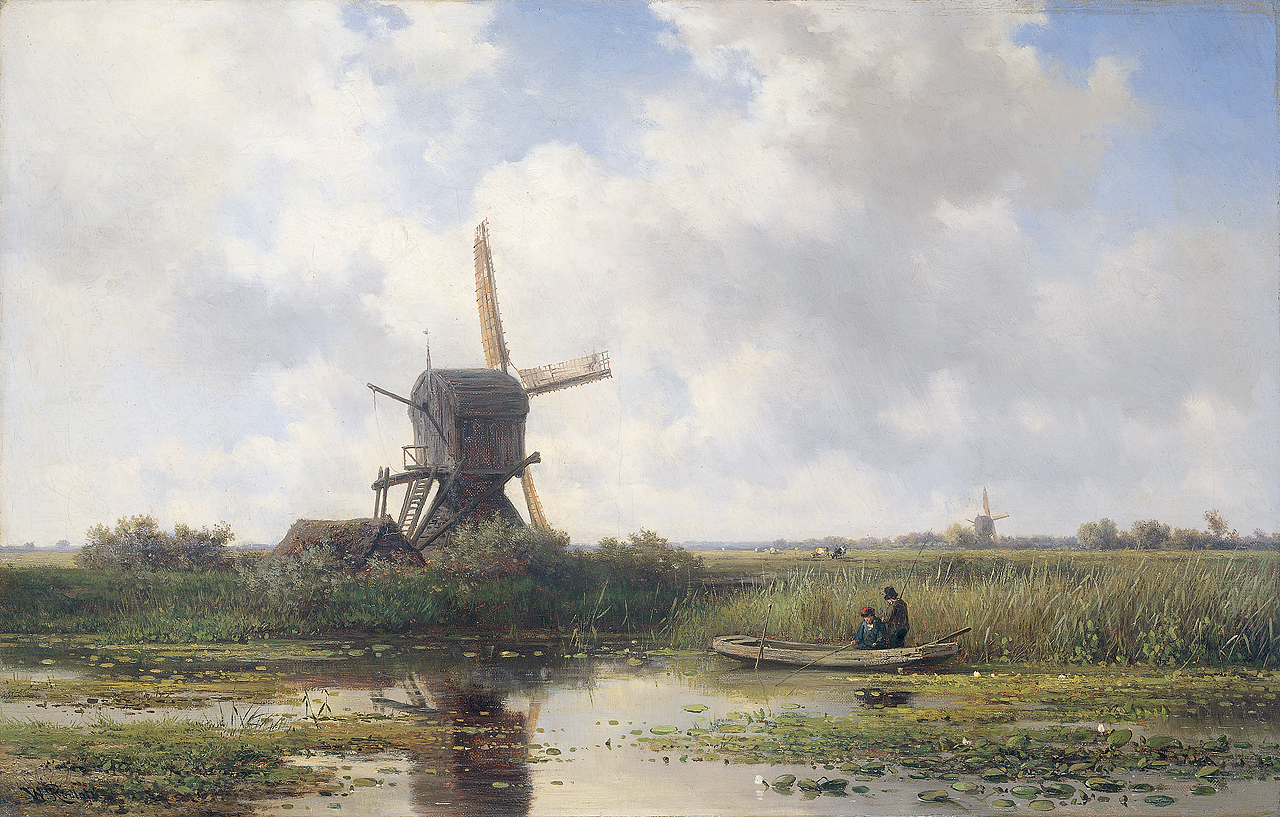
Willem Roelofs (after 1870): In t' gein bij Adcoude, Rijksmuseum Amsterdam.

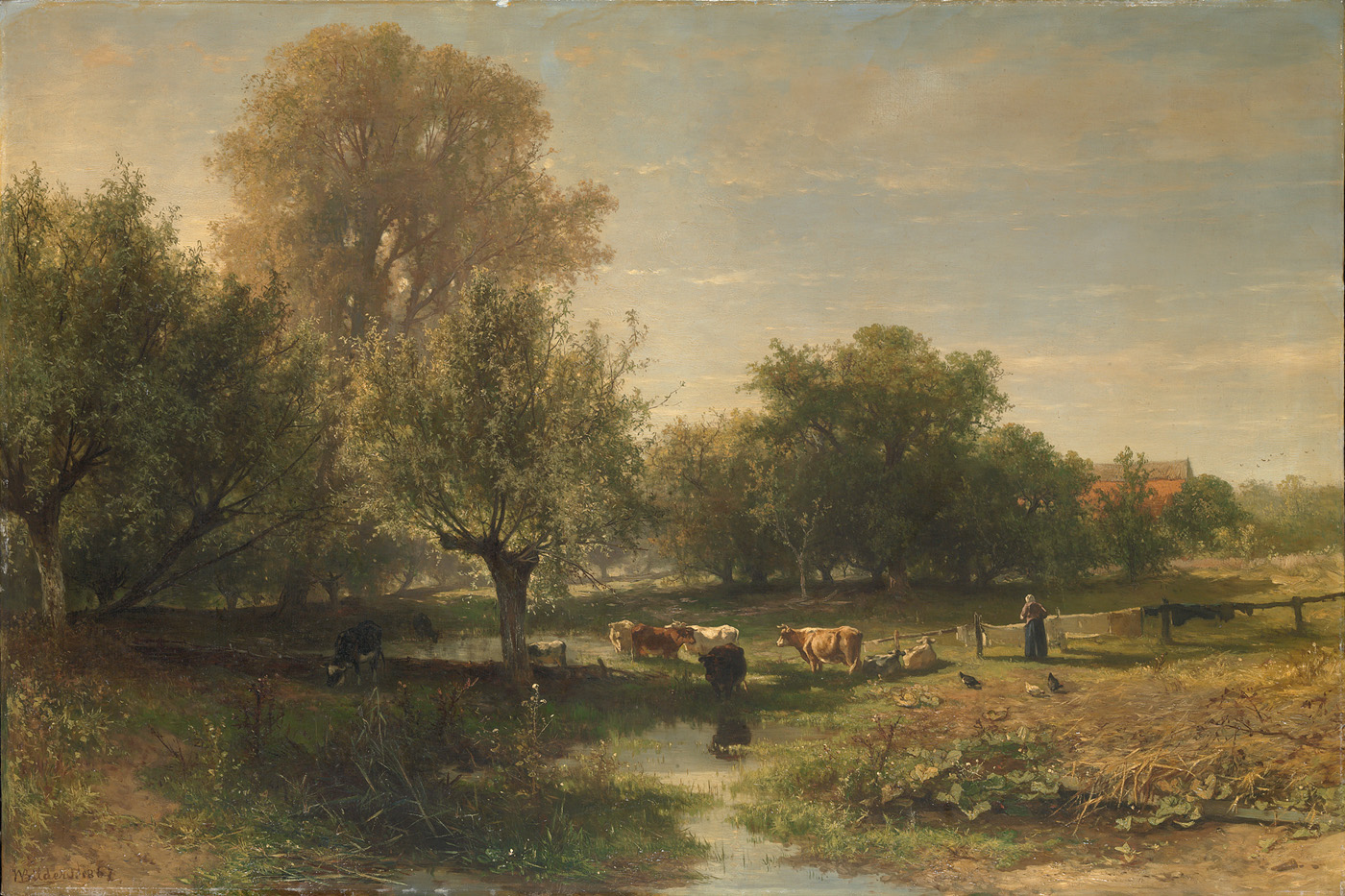
Willem Roelofs (1867): Landschap te Oosterbeek-Landschap met vee (provincie Gelderland), Amsterdam Museum.

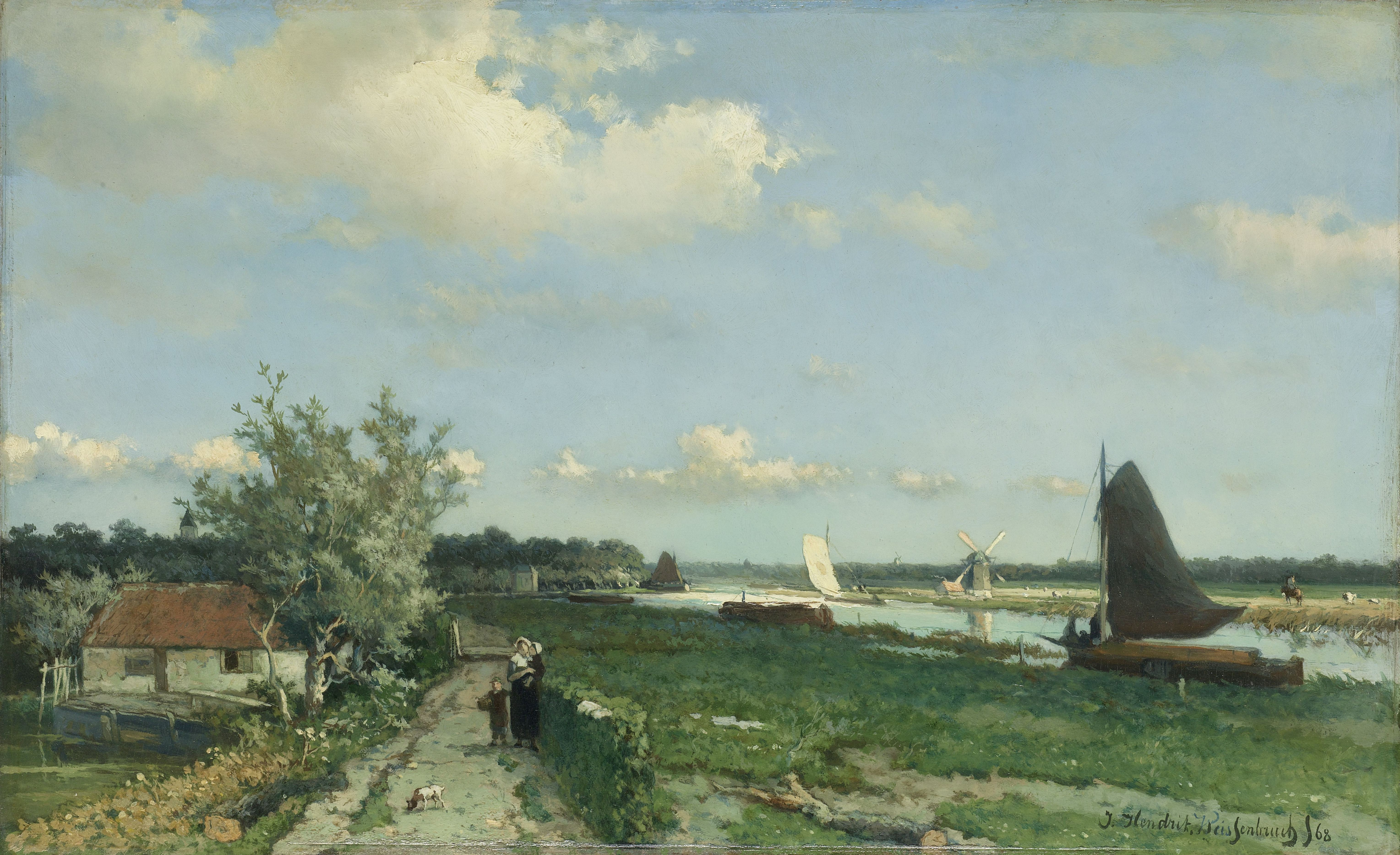
Jan Hendrik Weissenbruch: The Shipping Canal at Rijswijk, known as 'The View at Geestbrug', Rijksmuseum, Amsterdam

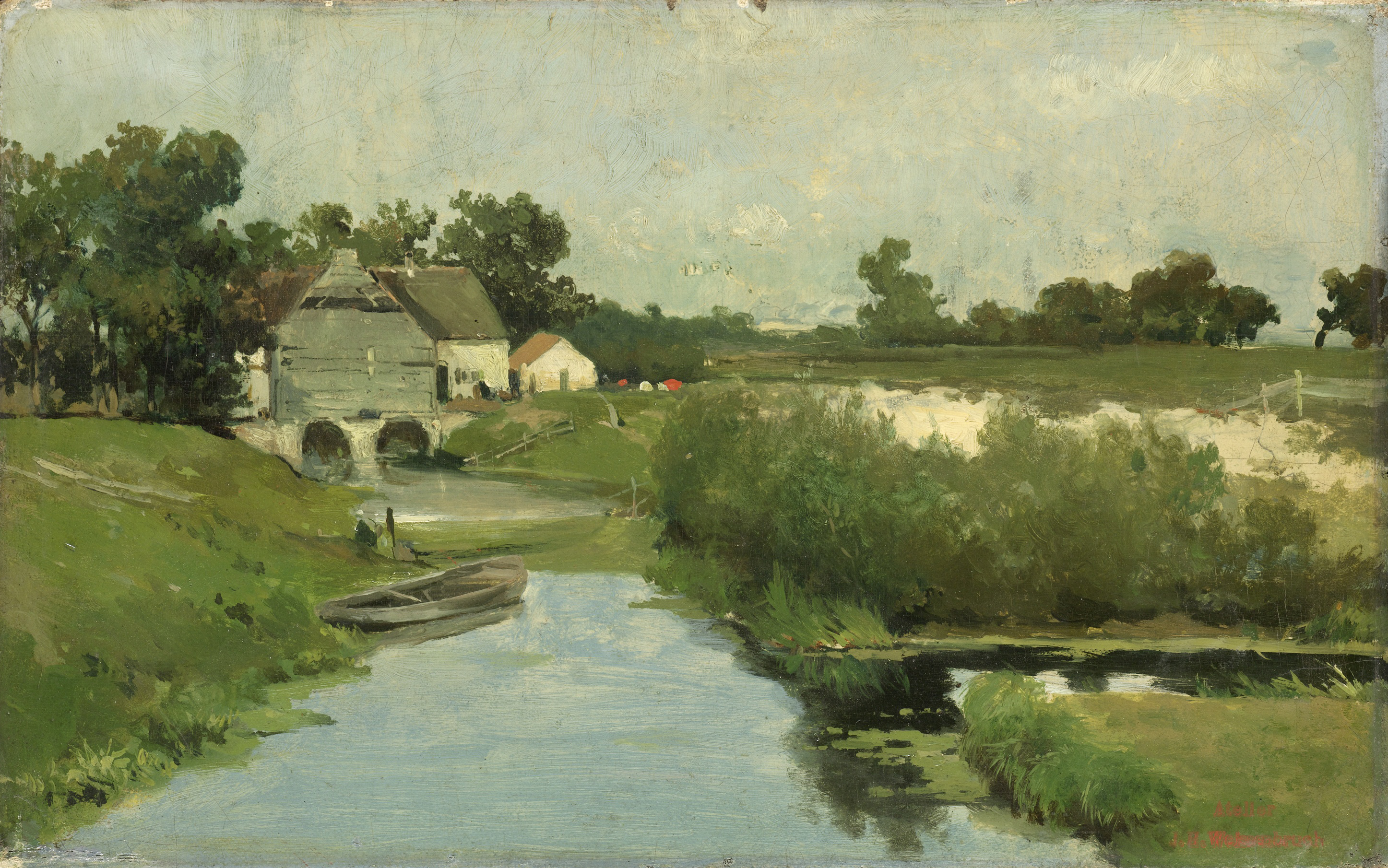
Jan Hendrik Weissenbruch: Zomerdag, Rijksmuseum Amsterdam

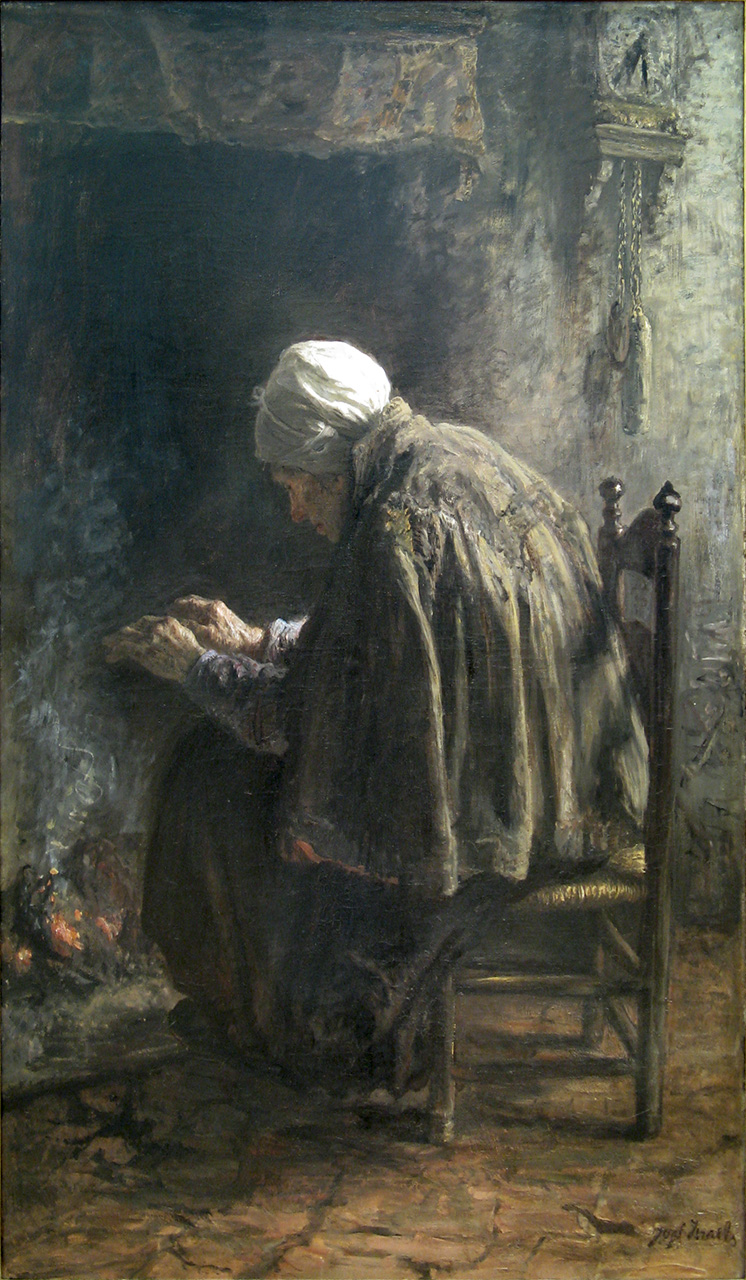
Jozef Israëls (1883): When One Grows Old, Kunstmuseum Den Haag

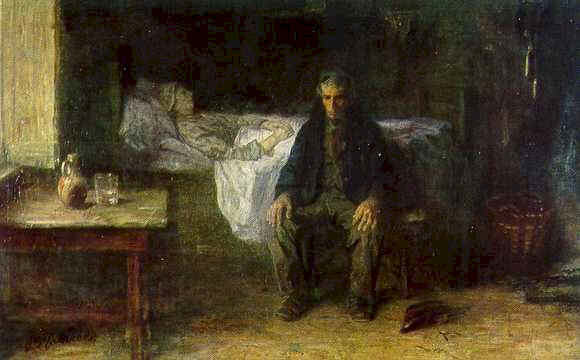
Jozef Israëls (1881): Alone in the World, Van Gogh Museum, Amsterdam

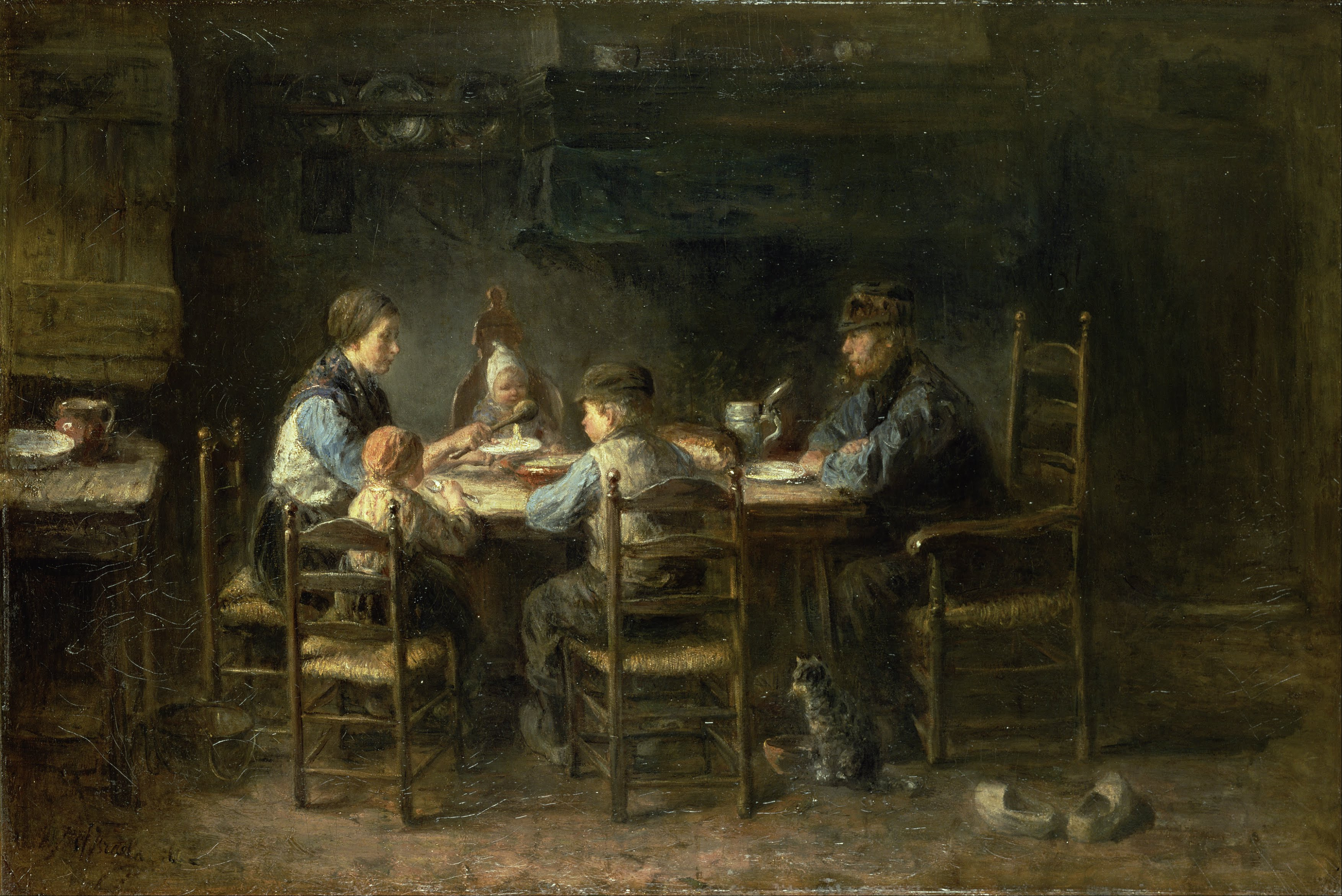
Jozef Israëls: Peasant family at the table 1882, Van Gogh Museum, Amsterdam

== Gallery of the second generation ==
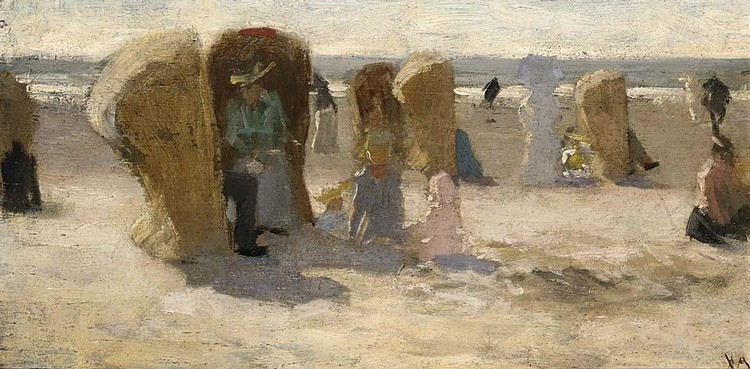
Floris Arntzenius: On Scheveningen beach

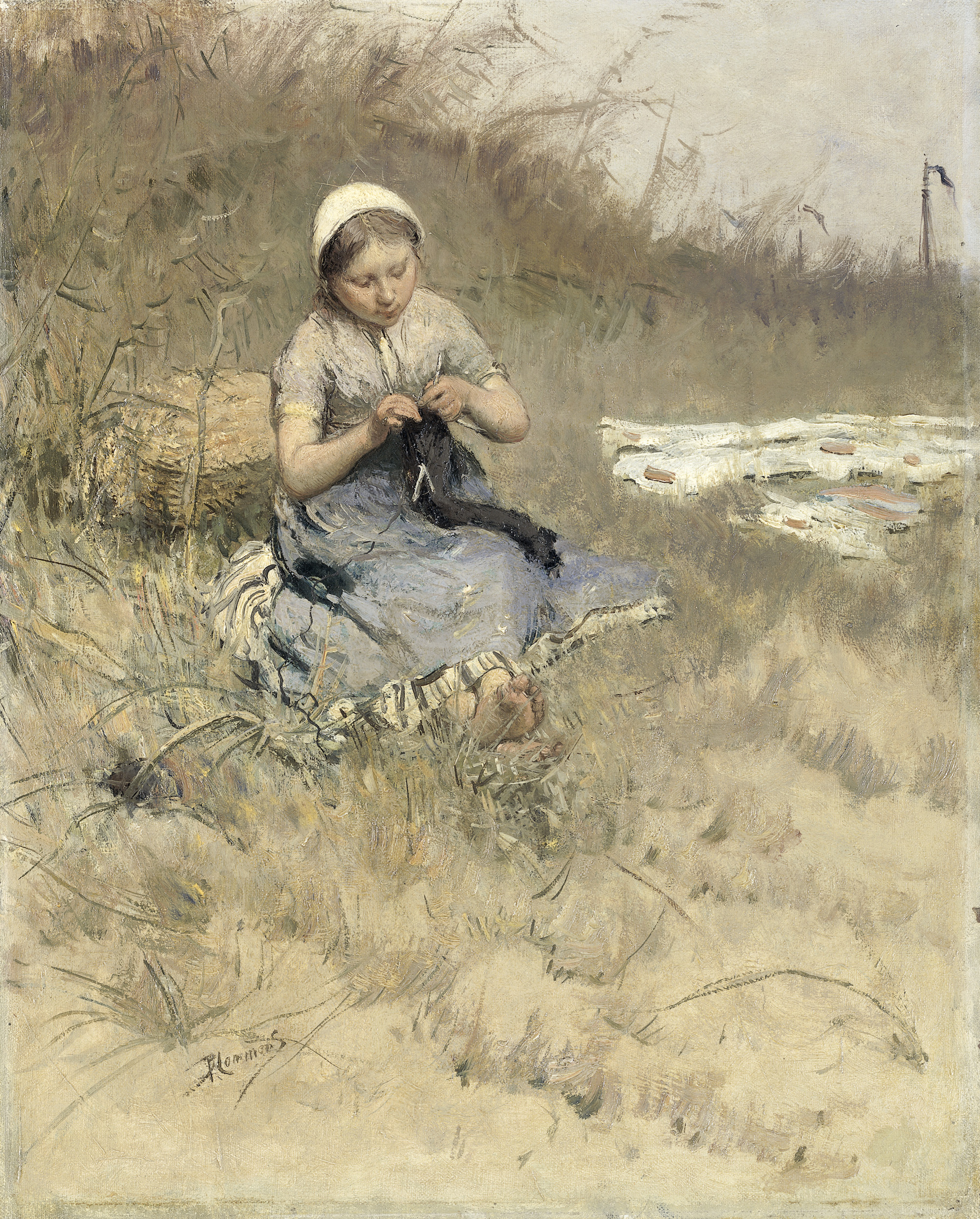
Bernard Blommers: Het breistertje, Rijksmuseum Amsterdam

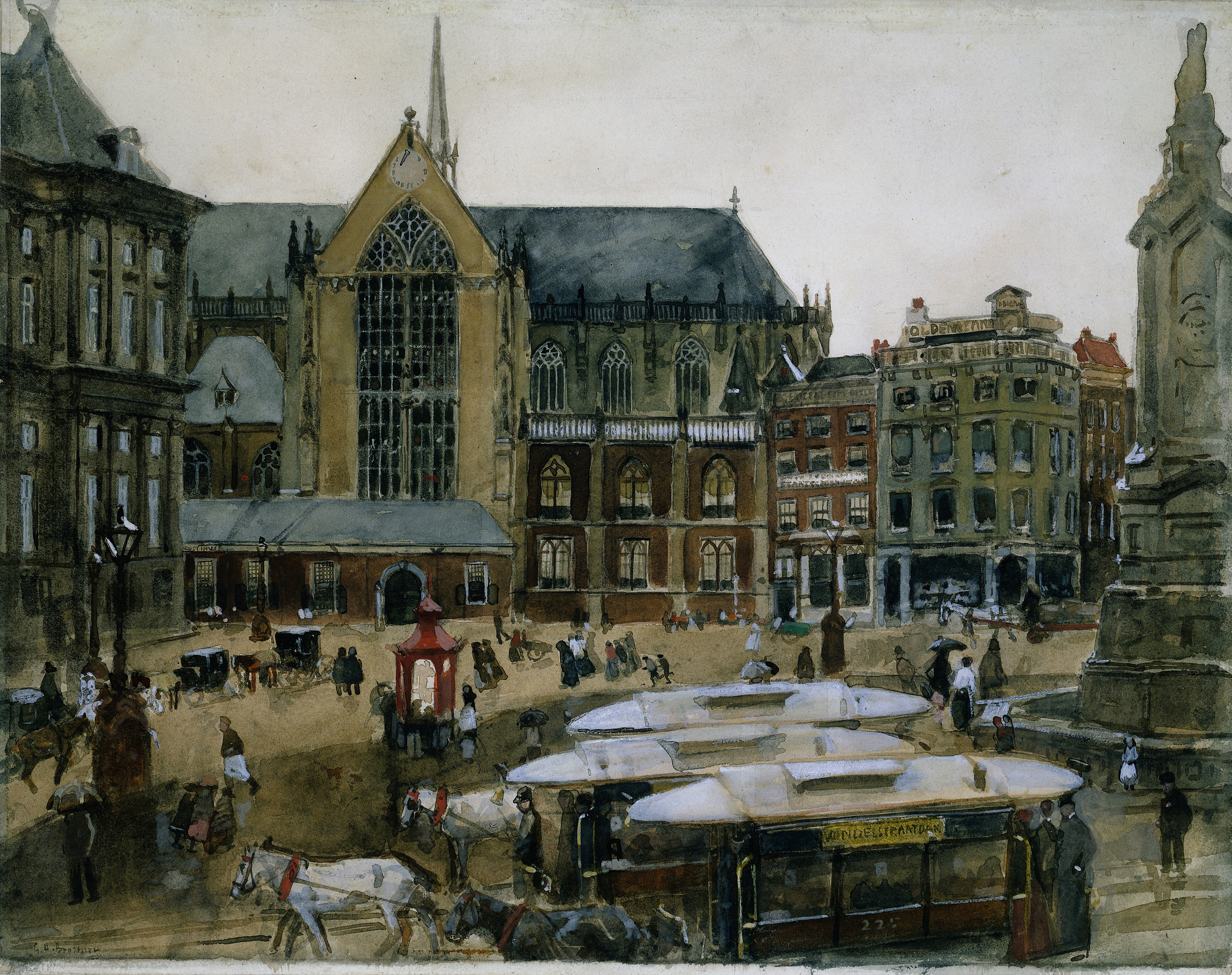
George Hendrik Breitner: Gezicht op de Dam te Amsterdam, Rijksmuseum, Amsterdam

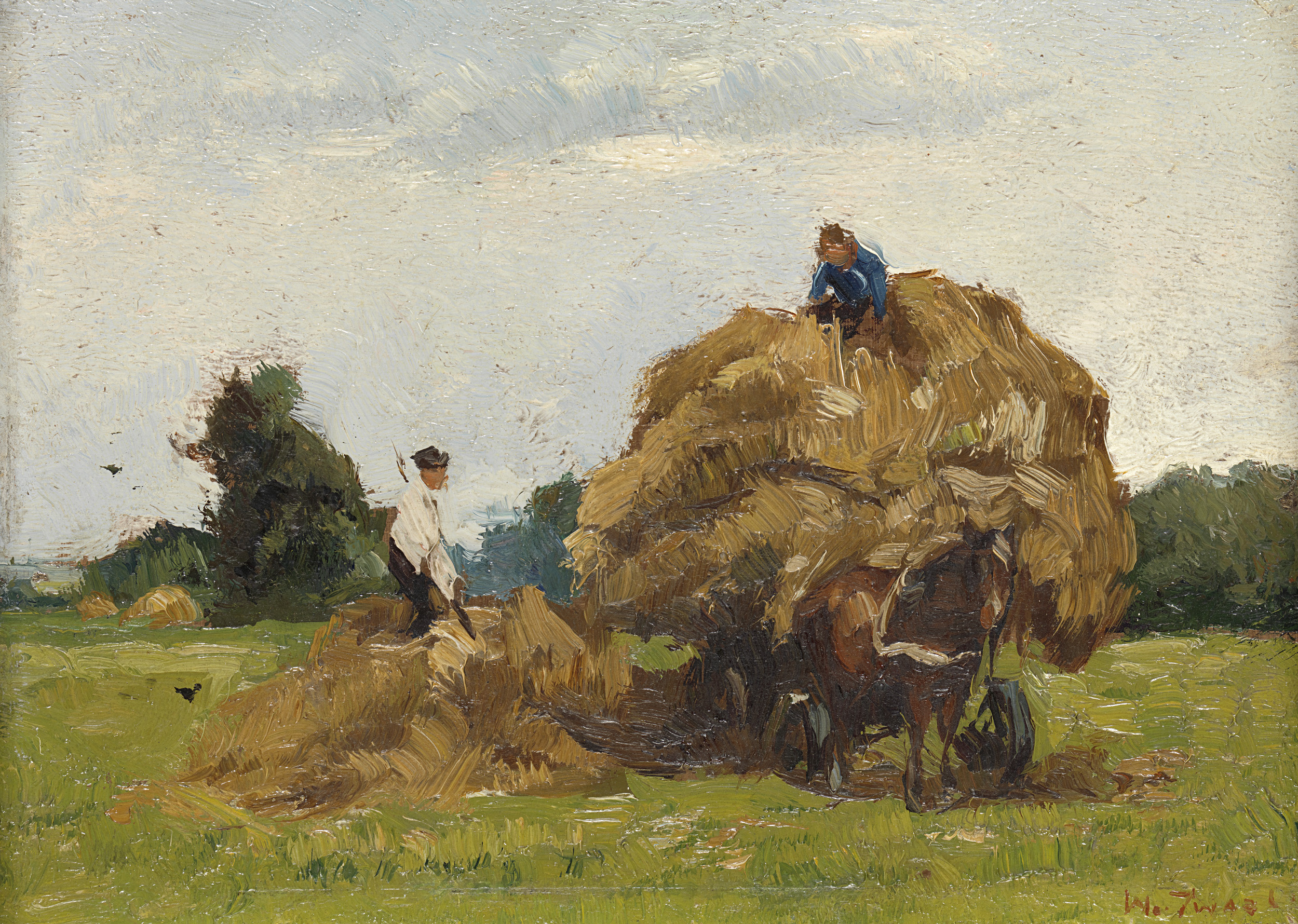
Willem de Zwart: Hooiwagen, Rijksmuseum, Amsterdam

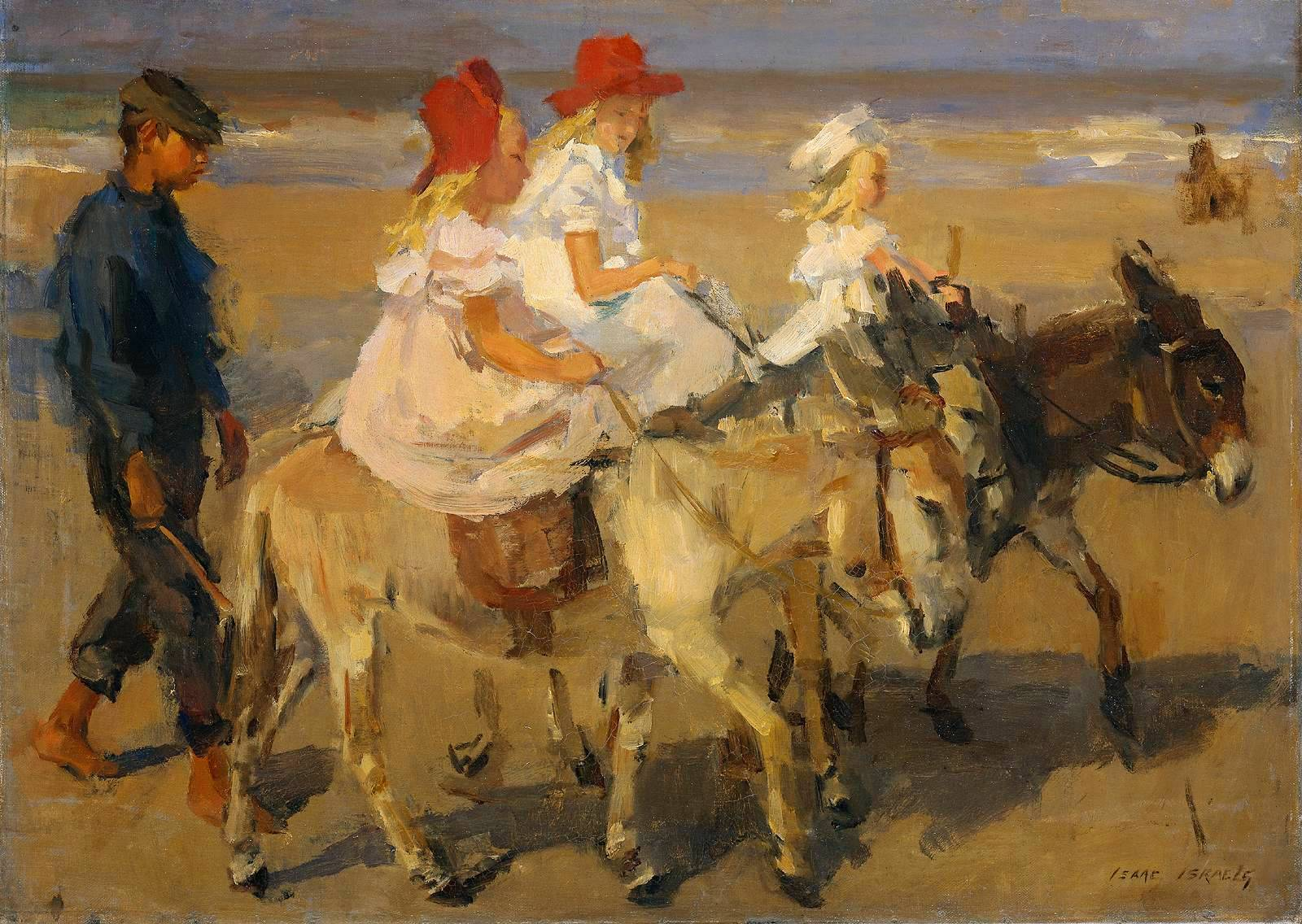
Isaac Israels: Donkey Ride, Rijksmuseum, Amsterdam

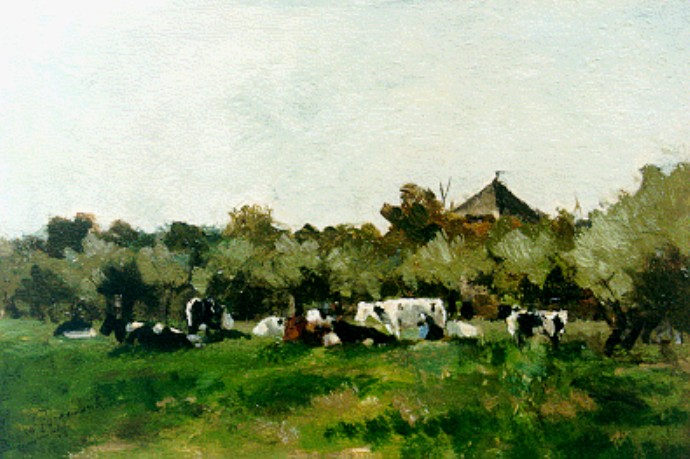
George Jan Hendrik Poggenbeek: melktijd

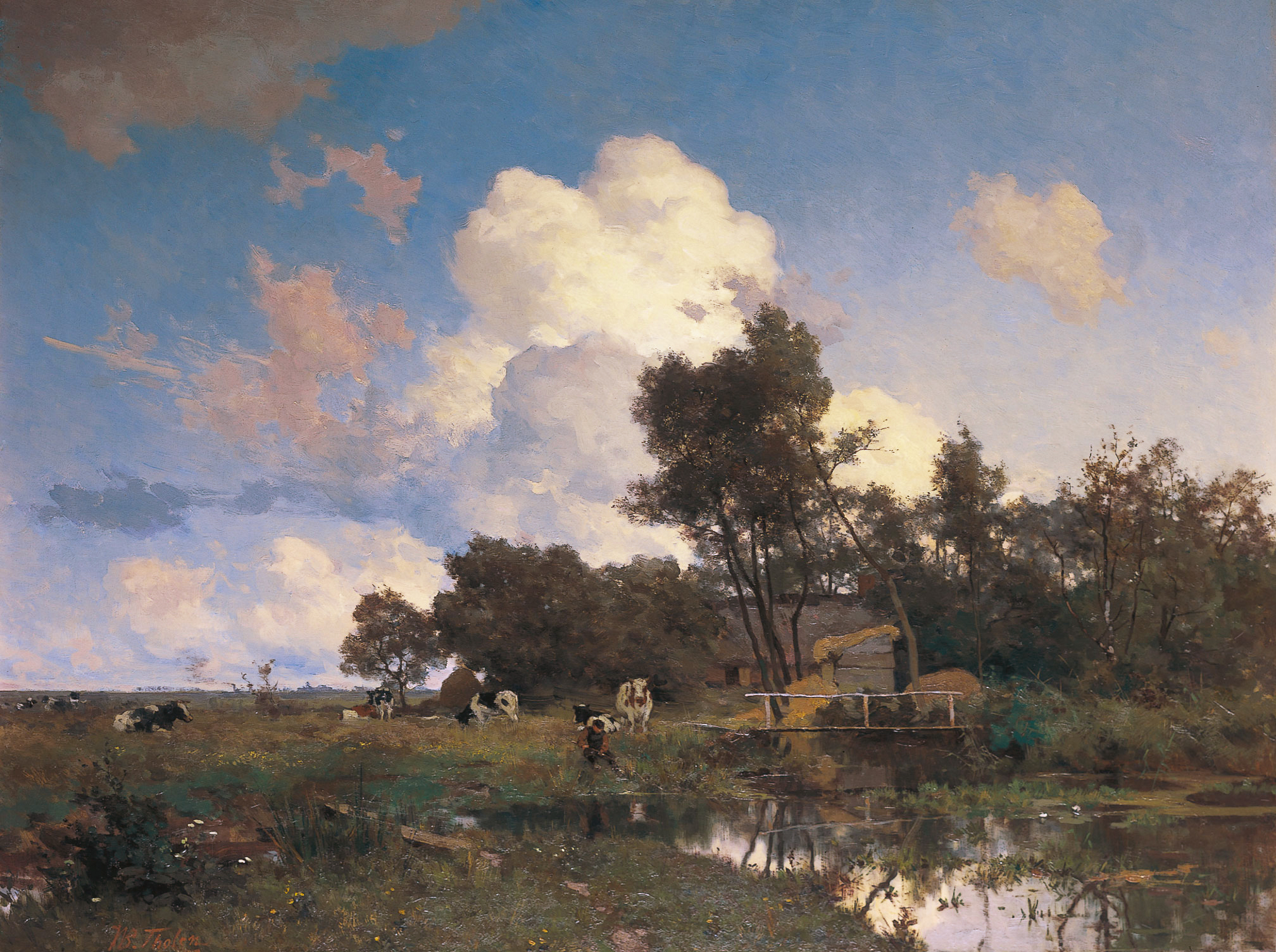
Willem Bastiaan Tholen: Zomers boerenlandschap, private collection

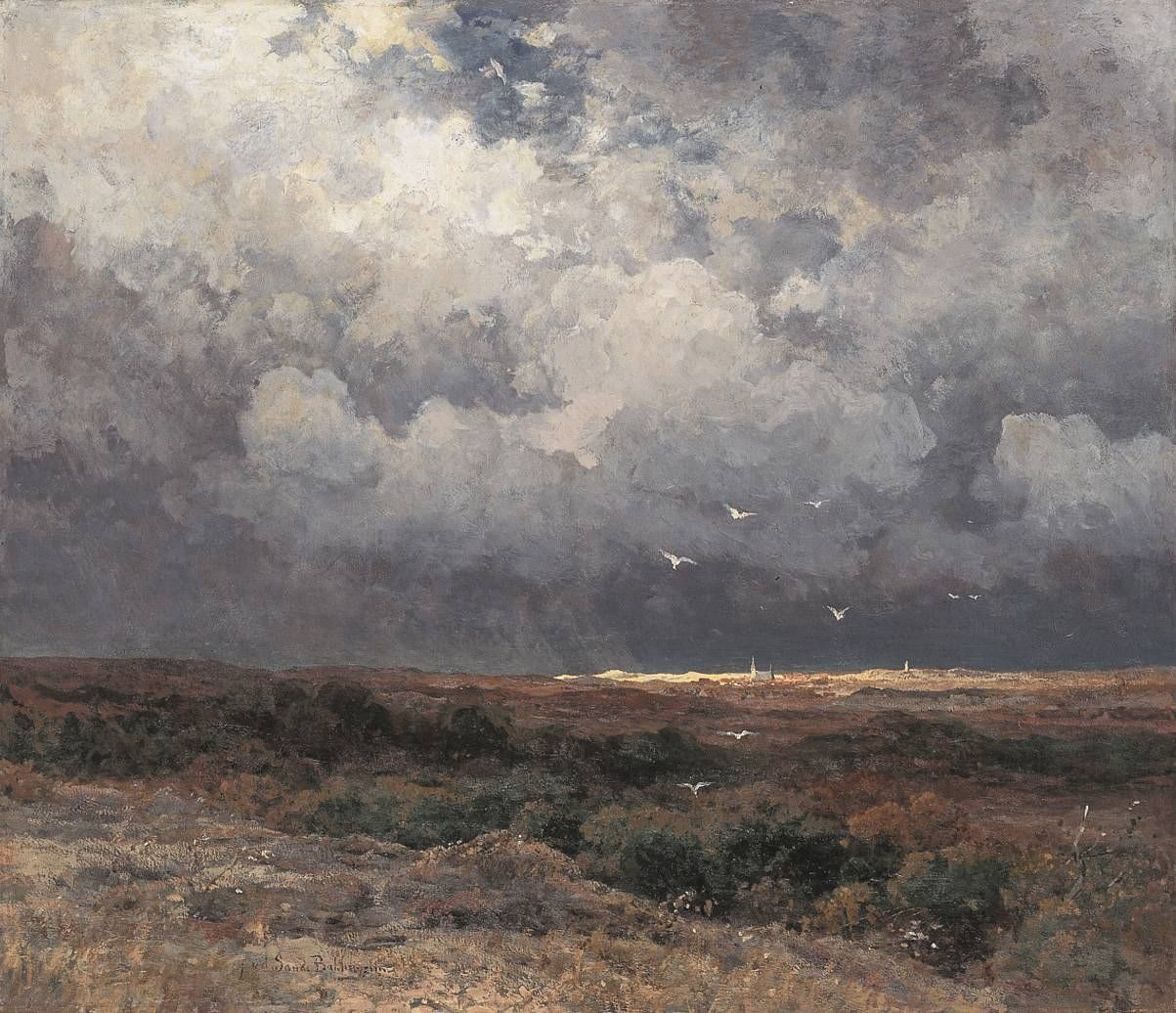
Julius Jacobus van de Sande Bakhuyzen: Dorf in den Dünen. Bavarian State Painting Collections

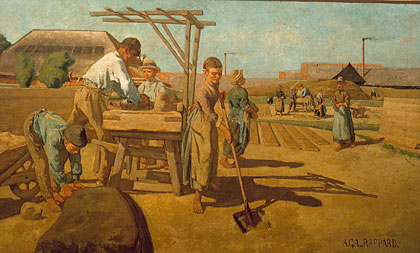
Anthon van Rappard: Arbeiders op de steenbakkerij Ruimzicht

== Exhibitions ==
- 1863 Tentoonstelling van Kunstwerken van Levende Meesters, Hague School of Art, The Hague, The Netherlands.
- 1904 Pulchri Studio, Kunstverein Hamburg, Hamburg, Germany.
- 1969 Mondriaan and the Hague School of landscape painting, Norman McKenzie Art Gallery, Regina, Kanada.
- 1969 Mondriaan and the Hague School of landscape painting, Edmonton Art Gallery, Edmonton, Canada.
- 1972 Die Haager Schule: Holländische Maler vor 100 Jahren, Rheinisches Landesmuseum zu Bonn, Germany.
- 1972 Hamburger Kunsthalle: Die Haager Schule: Holländische Maler vor 100 Jahren, Germany.
- 1980 Mondriaan and The Hague School: Watercolors and drawings from the Gemeentemuseum, The Hague, The Netherlands.
- 1981 Verso l’astrattisma. Mondrian e la Scuola dell’Aia, Florenz, Italy.
- 1982 Verso l’astrattisma. Mondrian e la Scuola dell’Aia, Mailand, Italy.
- 1982 Mondrian et l’École de La Haye: aquarelles et dessins du Haags Gementemuseum, La Haye et d’une collection particuliere, Paris, France.
- 1982 The Hague School and its American Legacy, West Palm Beach, Florida, US.
- 1983 L’École de La Haye: Les maîtres hollandaise de 19ème siècle, Galeries nationals du Grand Palais, Paris, France.
- 1983 The Hague School: Dutch masters of the 19th century, Royal Academy of Arts, London, England.
- 1984 The Hague School: Collecting in Canada at the Turn of the century, Art Gallery of Ontario, Canada.
- 1987 Die Haager Schule: Meisterwerke der Holländischen Malerei des 19. Jahrhunderts aus dem Gemeentemuseum, Städtische Kunsthalle Mannheim, Mannheim, Germany.
- 1989 Die Haager Schule in München, Neue Pinakothek, München, Germany.
- 1992 Dutch Drawings from the Age of van Gogh from the Collection of the Hague Gemeentemuseum, The Taft Museum of Art, Cincinnati, US.
- 1996 Van Gogh und die Haager Schule, Bank Austria Kunstforum, Wien, Austria.
- 1999 Jan Hendrik Weissenbruch (1824-1903): vorbij de Haagse School, Museum Jan Cunen, Oss, The Netherlands.
- 2001 Mesdag and the Hague School, Gemeentemuseum Den Haag, The Hague, The Netherlands.
- 2003 Jacob Maris: A retrospective of the work of a Dutch Impressionist, Teylers Museum, Haarlem, The Netherlands.
- 2003 Willem Witsen (1860-1923: Moods, Dordrechts Museum, Dordrecht, The Netherlands.
- 2004 De Haagse School and the young van Gogh, Stadhuis Brussel, Brüssel, Belgium.
- 2004 Jacob Maris, 1837-1899, Museum Jan Cunen, Oss, The Netherlands.
- 2004 The Hague School, Gemeentemuseum Den Haag, The Hague, The Netherlands.
- 2005 Waiting for van Gogh: Dutch Painting from the 19th Century, Crocker Art Museum, Sacramento, US.
- 2007 Plain Air: The Hague School and the School of Barbizon, Gemeentemuseum, The Hague, The Netherlands.
- 2006 Mesdag and The Hague School, Gemeentemuseum, Den Haag, The Netherlands.
- 2008 Der Weite Blick: Landschaften der Haager Schule aus dem Rijksmuseum, Neue Pinakothek zu München, Germany.
- 2009 The Hague School Revealed, Gemeentemuseum, Den Haag, The Netherlands.
- 2009 The Hague School: Masterpieces from the Rijksmuseum, Centro Cultural Caixanova, Spain.
- 2012 Mesdag to Mondrian: Dutch Art from the Redelé Collection, Academy Art Museum, Maryland, US.
- 2013 Modern Naturalist Painting in the Dutch Hague School: Inspiration from the Barbizon School and the Origin of van Gogh, Yamanashi Prefectural Museum of Art, Kofu, Japan.
- 2014 Reflections of Holland: The Hague School and Barbizon, Japan Museum of Art, Tokyo, Japan.
- 2015 Holland at its Finest, Gemeentemuseum Den Haag + Dordrechtmuseum Dordrecht, The Netherlands.
- 2015 Grenzeloos Schilderachtig, Katwijks Museum, Katwijk, The Netherlands.
- 2015 Watercolors – Exhibition about the most beautiful Dutch watercolors from the 19th century, Teylors Museum, Haarlem, The Netherlands.
- 2024 The Hague – Kyiv. Paintings of the lade 19th and early 20th centuries from the Hoogsteder and Ponamarchuk family collections, The Bohdan and Varvara Khanenko National Museum of Arts, Kyiv, Ukraine
- 2025 The Hague School: The Second Golden Age of Dutch Painting, Lightner Museum, St. Augustine, Florida, USA

== Catalogues ==
- Anna Wagner: Die Haager Schule - Holländische Maler vor hundert Jahren, Rheinisches Landesmuseum Bonn 1972, catalogue. ISBN 3-7927-0142-1.
- Ronald de Leeuw, John Sillevis, Charles Dumas (Hrsg.): The Hague school – Dutch masters of the 19th century, catalogue, Gemeentemuseum, Den Haag, Weidenfeld & Nicolson, London 1983.
- John Sillevis, Hans Kraan, Roland Dorn: Die Haager Schule - Meisterwerke der holländischen Malerei des 19. Jahrhunderts aus Haags Gemeentemuseum. catalogue, Ed. Braus, Heidelberg, 1987, ISBN 3-925835-08-3.
- Sillevis, John: Dutch Drawings From the Age of Van Gogh, Taft Museum, Cincinnati, Ohio, 1992.
- Roland Dorn, Klaus Albrecht Schröder, John Sillevis (Hrsg.): Van Gogh und die Haager Schule, catalog, Bank of Austria - Kunstforum Wien, Skira editore Mailand, 1996, ISBN 88-8118-072-3.
- De Bodt, Saskia and Sellink, Manfred: Nineteenth Century Dutch Watercolors and Drawings, Museum Boijmans Van Beuningen, catalogue, Rotterdam, 1998.
- Sillevis, John and Tabak, Anne: The Hague School Book, Waanders Uitgegevers, Zwolle, 2004.
- Fred Leeman, John Sillevis: De Haagse School en de jonge Van Gogh. Ausstellungskatalog, Waanders, Zwolle, Gemeentemuseum, Den Haag, 2005, ISBN 90-400-9071-8.
- Renske Suyver: A Reflection of Holland – the Best of the Hague School in the Rijksmuseum. Rijksmuseum Amsterdam, 2011, ISBN 90-8689-048-2.

== Selected bibliographies ==
- Lévêque, Jean-Jaques: L'AUBE DE IMPRESSIONNISME - 1848 - 1869, ACR, Édition Internationale, Courbevoie, Paris, 2000, ISBN 2-86770-058-2.
- Imanse, Geurt: Van Gogh bis Cobra: holländische Malerei 1880–1950. Hatje, 1980, ISBN 3-7757-0160-5.
