= When One Grows Old =

Painting by Jozef Israëls

- Als men oud wordt (Dutch)
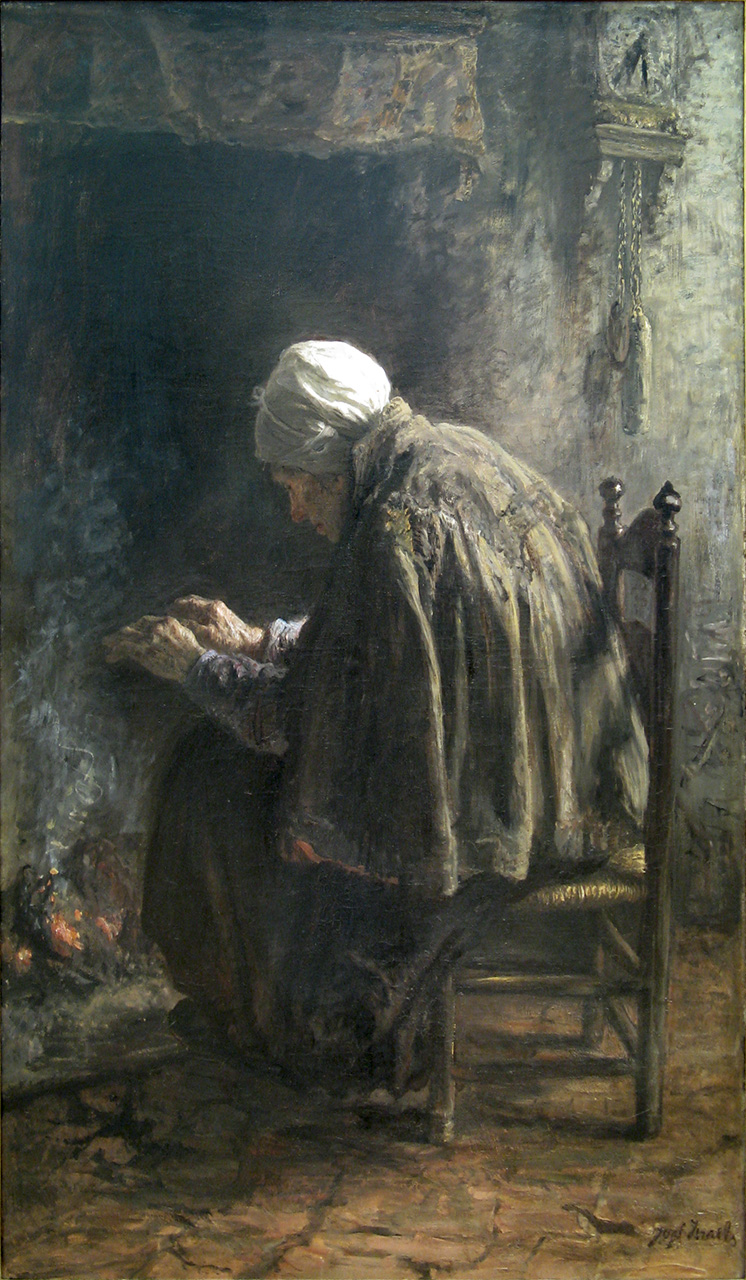
- Artist: Jozef Israëls
- Year: 1883
- Medium: Oil-on-canvas
- Movement: Realism (arts)
- Dimensions: 160 cm (63 in) x 101 cm (40 in)
- Location: Kunstmuseum Den Haag, The Hague
- Website: When One Grows Old

When One Grows Old is an oil on canvas painting by Dutch artist Jozef Israëls, from 1883. It depicts an old woman warming herself by a fireplace. The painting is housed at the Kunstmuseum Den Haag and it is on loan from Erven van Hijmans van Wadenoyen.

== History ==
In 1871 Jozef Israëls moved to The Hague. In 1881 he completed the painting When One Grows Old. In Dutch, the painting is known as Als men oud wordt.

== Description ==
The painting is of an old peasant woman who is warming herself by a fireplace. The painting depicts a contemplative stillness. The old woman is hunched over with her back bent and her hands stretched out toward the fireplace.

== Reception ==
In the book Jozef Israëls author John Ernest Phythian states that the painting sums up Israëls techniques as a painter. His image of the woman (as with his other peasant subjects) is a portrayal of a peasant who is not at work.
