= Van de Sande Bakhuyzen =

Van de Sande Bakhuyzen is a Dutch family with a number of notable members. The family name originated in The Hague with Hendrik van de Sande Bakhuyzen, son of the prominent publisher Gerrit Bakhuysen (1758–1843) and Jacoba van de Sande (1757–1815). In 1819, Hendrik obtained a legal permission by royal decree to add his late mother's surname to his own, before marrying Sophia Wilhelmine Kiehl (1804–1881) in 1825. Sophia's father was Daniel Nicolaus Friedrich Kiehl who served as Steward to his majesty the King which could explain how Hendrik and Sophia were introduced to each other. "Bakhuyzen" can also be spelled "Bakhuijzen" and, especially before 1811, can also be found written as "Backhuijsen", "Backhuysen", "Bakhuijsen", and "Bakhuizen".

In 1994, the family was included in the genealogical reference book Nederland's Patriciaat.

== Notable members ==
- Hendrik van de Sande Bakhuyzen (1795–1860), landscape painter and art teacher
  - Gerardina Jacoba van de Sande Bakhuyzen (1826–1895), still life and flower painter
  - Willem Hendrik van de Sande Bakhuyzen (1831–1919), minister and head of a gymnasium
    - Willem Hendrik van de Sande Bakhuyzen (1888–1946), patent attorney
      - Nicolaas Jan van de Sande Bakhuyzen (1924–1980), judge and court president
        - Willem van de Sande Bakhuyzen (1957–2005), film director
          - Matthijs van de Sande Bakhuyzen (born 1988), movie and television actor
          - Roeltje van de Sande Bakhuyzen (born 1992), movie and television actress
  - Julius van de Sande Bakhuyzen (1835–1925), etcher and painter, co—founder of the Hague School
  - Hendricus Gerardus van de Sande Bakhuyzen (1838–1923), astronomer, director of the Leiden Observatory
    - Adriaan van de Sande Bakhuyzen (1874–1951), Mayor of Leiden from 1927 to 1945
  - Ernst Frederik van de Sande Bakhuyzen (1848–1918), astronomer, director of the Leiden Observatory

== See also ==
- Bakhuysen (crater), Martian crater named after Hendricus Gerardus vdS B
- Ludolf Bakhuizen (1630–1708), a seemingly unrelated Dutch painter born in East Frisia
