= Van de Sande =

Van de Sande (also "van den" and "van der Sande") is a Dutch toponymic surname meaning "from the sand" (Modern Dutch van het zand). The name could for example have originated from any of the settlements in the Low Countries named 't Zand. People with the surname include:

- Gijsbert van der Sande (1863–1910), Dutch physician and explorer of New Guinea
- Johan van den Sande (1568–1638), Dutch historian and prominent writer of the common law of Friesland
- Jort van der Sande (born 1996), Dutch football forward
- Louis van de Sande (1887–1954), Dutch bass-baritone singer
- Roel van de Sande (born 1987), Dutch football midfielder
- Theo van de Sande (born 1947), Dutch cinematographer
- Tosh Van der Sande (born 1990), Belgian racing cyclist
- Van de Sande Bakhuyzen, Dutch patrician family
- Chris Van de Sande (born 1978),

Renown Metal Artist

== See also ==
- Van der Zande, Dutch surname with the same meaning
- Francisco de Sande (1540–1602), 3rd Spanish governor of the Philippines
