= Hendrik Manfried Haus =

Dutch painter (1803–1843)

Hendrik Manfried Haus (Bergen op Zoom, 5 June 1803 – Utrecht, 13 May 1843) was a Dutch painter. Little is known about his life. According to his baptismal record from 1803, Hendrik was born with his twin sister Maria to Frans Joseph Haus and Barbara Fehr. They had two daughters in succession; the first died shortly after birth and the second when she was three years old. There is a letter from 1840 by him in the archive of the Rijksmuseum in which he reports that he and his wife have been under medical treatment for some time, and he offers a painting in the hope that the recipient will buy it. The Dutch art dealer and writer Pieter A. Scheen wrote about him: He received his education in The Hague, where he appears in the population registers in 1823 and 1830, and moved to Utrecht around 1835. He primarily worked in small formats using oil on panel, canvas, and copper with winter and summer landscapes in the style of Andreas Schelfhout. His works were exhibited in The Hague in 1837, Amsterdam in 1841, and Rotterdam in 1840 and 1848.

Haus died in Utrecht at the age of 39. Although he is relatively unknown, more than twenty of his works have been offered at auctions since 1989. Most of these works were auctioned outside the Netherlands, particularly in Germany, Austria, Switzerland, France, and the United States. The highest price bid for his work was for a piece measuring 32.5 × 43.5 cm titled 'Riders in a Village' at Dorotheum in Vienna, Austria (2005). The Utrecht Centraal Museum has several of his works in its collection.

Hendrik Manfried Haus, 1841, oil on panel (21 × 28 cm), private collection
