= 't Zand =

't Zand may refer to several settlements:

In Belgium:

- 't Zand (Brugge) in Bruges

In the Netherlands:

- 't Zand, Alphen-Chaam in North Brabant
- 't Zand, Altena in North Brabant
- 't Zand, Hattem in Gelderland
- 't Zand, Nijmegen in Gelderland
- 't Zand, Schagen in North Holland
- Het Zand, Utrecht in Utrecht
- 't Zandt in Groningen
