= Hendrik van de Sande Bakhuyzen =

Dutch painter and art teacher

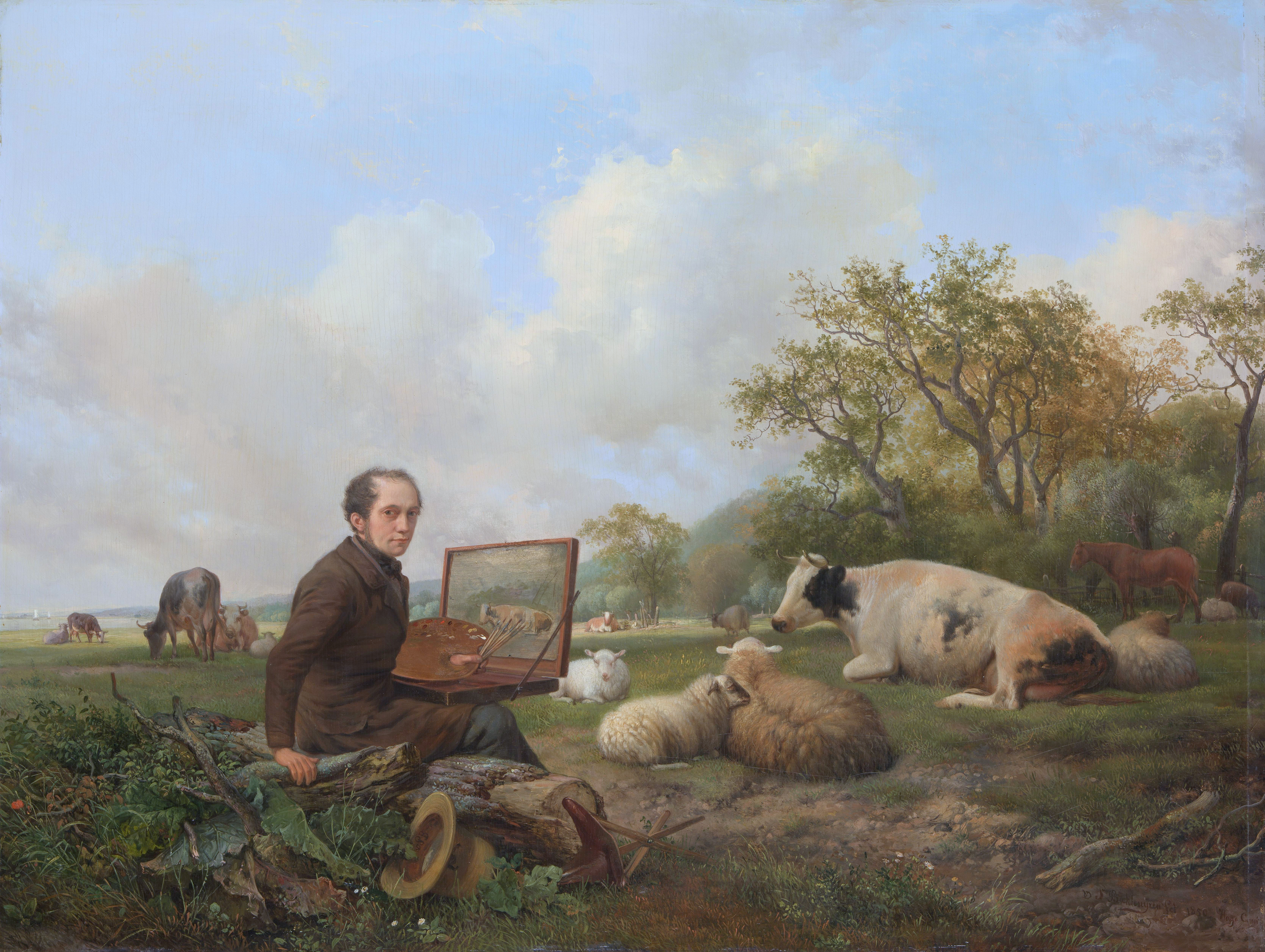
The Artist Painting a Cow in a Meadow Landscape. Oil on panel, 1850. Rijksmuseum

Hendrik (Hendrikus) van de Sande Bakhuyzen (2 January 1795 – 12 December 1860) was a Dutch landscape painter and art teacher. He was a prominent contributor to the Romantic period in Dutch art and his students and children founded the art movement known as the Hague School. Like his contemporaries Edward Williams, Jacob Maris, and Jozef Israëls, he was part of a family of prominent painters, including son Julius van de Sande Bakhuyzen, daughter Gerardina Jacoba van de Sande Bakhuyzen, and nephew Alexander Hieronymus Bakhuyzen.

== Personal life ==
He was born under the name Hendrikus Bakhuyzen in the Hague in 1795, the son of prominent publisher Gerrit Bakhuysen (1758–1843) and Jacoba van de Sande (1757–1815). In 1819 he obtained a Royal Decree granting legal permission to add his late mother's surname to his own and became known as Hendrikus van de Sande Bakhuyzen. His wife was Sophia Wilhelmine Kiehl (1804–1881). He lived principally in The Hague in the Netherlands. He died on 12 December 1860. His son, Julius van de Sande Bakhuyzen (1835–1925), became a well-known landscape painter as well. His daughter, Gerardine Jacoba van de Sande Bakhuyzen (1826–1895), was a painter of still life, flowers, and fruit. His son Henricus Gerardus van de Sande Bakhuyzen (1838–1923) became a prominent astronomer, member of the Royal Netherlands Academy of Arts and Sciences, and director of the Leiden Observatory. His son Ernest-Frederich van de Sande Bakhuyzen was also an astronomer at the Leiden Observatory.

== Career ==
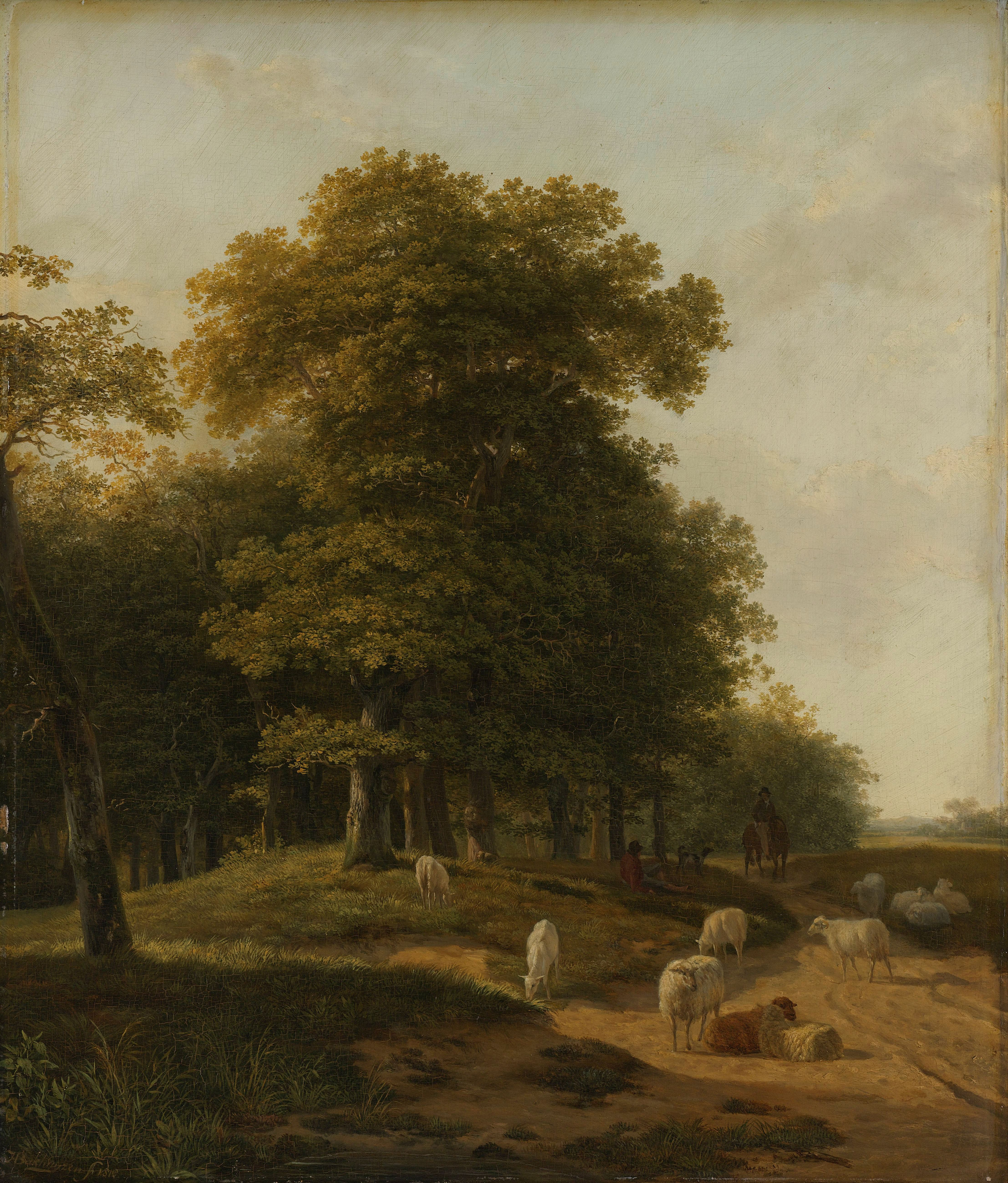
Gelders landscape

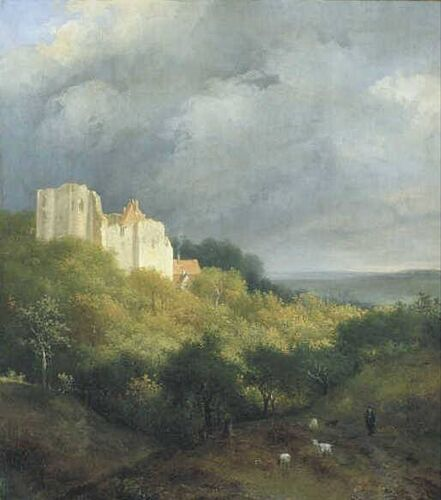
Ruin on a Mountain. 1810–1860

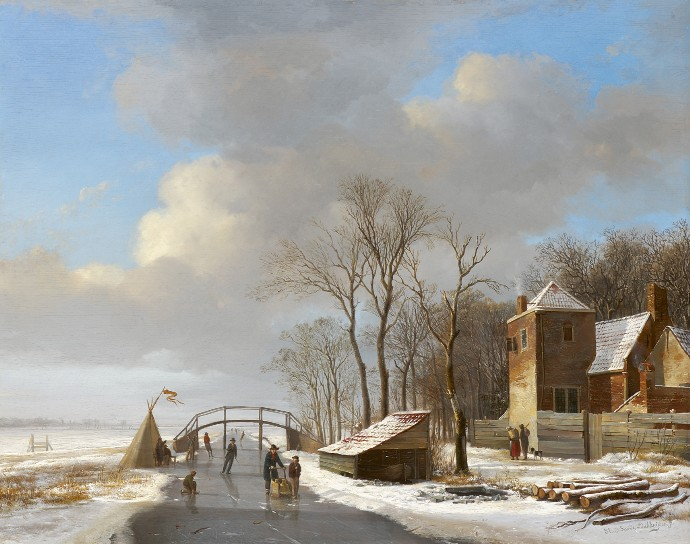
Winter landscape

Hendrik v.d.S. Bakhuyzen learned drawing and painting first from Jan Willem Pieneman and his pupil J. Heymans and then later from Simon Andreas Krausz at the Hague Academy, recently endowed by Willem I. His fellow students included Andreas Schelfhout and Bart van Hove, each of them significant for the development of the Hague School.

He was successful while still quite young, with his painting Gelders landschap acquired by the Rijksmuseum in Amsterdam in 1818. In 1821 he received a medal of honor from the Royal Society for the Encouragement of Fine Arts at an exhibit in Brussels, followed in 1822 by a medal and 300 guilder prize from the Society of Encouragement of Fine Arts in Antwerp. In the same year he became a member of the Royal Academy of Arts in Amsterdam and a board member of the Art Academy in The Hague. He was later elected Director of the Hague Academy.

He traveled to paint in Belgium in 1824 and in Germany in 1834. In 1840 he became one of the early members of the Arti et Amicitiae artists society in Amsterdam. In 1841 he traveled along the Rhine river in Germany with his pupil Willem Roelofs. He also painted landscape scenes from Noorden and the area around Oosterbeek, an artists' colony that later became known as the Dutch Barbizon. He was an active teacher and continued to take in pupils until shortly before he died. Some of these pupils, notably François Pieter ter Meulen became pupils of Hendrikus' son Julius upon his death. Even after his death, Hendrik's work continued to be displayed prominently in the family studio where his artist son and daughter painted.

== Art ==
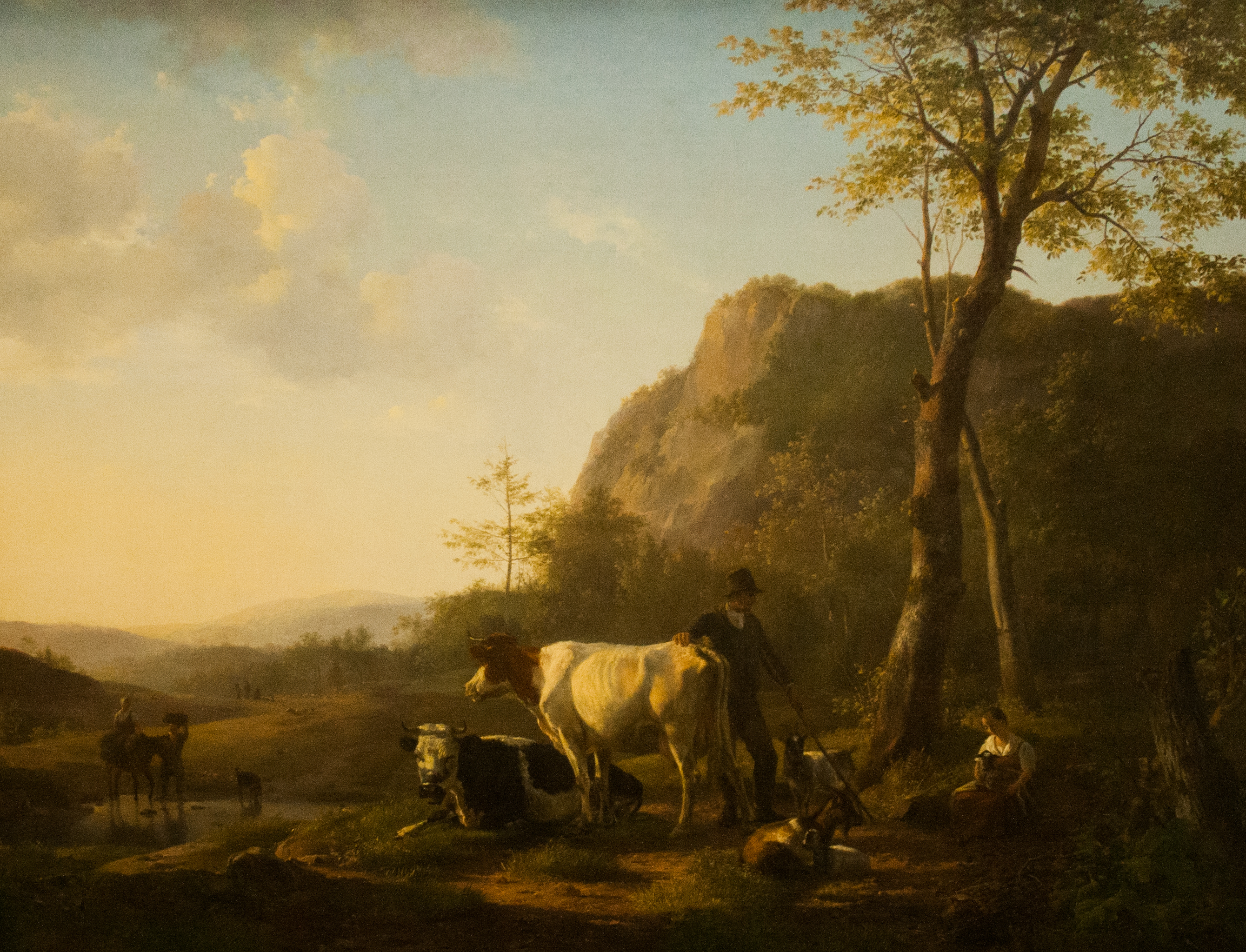
Shepherd and shepherdess with cattle in mountain landscape by H. van de Sande Bakhuyzen

He is known for his Romantic pastoral scenes (especially paintings of livestock) with detailed landscapes, notably inspired by Golden Age artist Paulus Potter and continuing the Realist tradition of that era. He emphasized drawing as essential to truthful painting, quoting the motto le dessin est the probite de l'art (drawing is the integrity of art) after French painter Ingres. He required his students to learn to sketch natural scenes in great detail before permitting them to hold a brush. This emphasis on work en plein air presaged the landscape work of Hague School artists. He has been described as "an honest landscape painter" whose scenes are "entirely free from mannerism and artificiality". His works often emphasized animals on the landscape, driven in part by their commercial success. His son Julius later relayed the story of one of Hendrik's paintings of a landscape near Oosterbeek that featured what was to his father an ordinary brown horse but which so caught the fancy of his customer's neighbors in Philadelphia that Hendrik received at least ten orders for similar pictures with that particular horse, as if the horse itself were somehow special.

Most of van de Sande Bakhuyzen's work was summer landscapes, but he also painted a small number of winter scenes, often of quintessentially Dutch scenes including windmills, ice skaters, and cottages built in traditional Dutch architectural style. In this vein his work closely resembled that of Andreas Schelfhout (1787–1870), a close friend who was famous for his winter landscapes and with whom v.d.S. Bakhuyzen collaborated, including at least one joint canvas that bears both artists' signatures.

His work is displayed in the Rijksmuseum, the British National Trust, Teylers Museum in Haarlem, Museum Fodor, Museum of Fine Arts Bern, and the Royal Museums of Fine Arts of Belgium, among others.

== Influence ==
Hendrik v.d.S. Bakhuyzen was profoundly influential in 19th Century Dutch art, both through his own landscapes and through his students. His students helped to establish the Dutch art movement the Hague School.

=== Influence on The Hague School ===
The Hague School of artists sought to transition from the romantic realism of the preceding generation to a new style that emphasized mood and movement. For instance, Gerard Bilders wrote to Johannes Kneppelhout that "It is not my aim and object to paint a cow for the cow's sake or a tree for the tree's, but by means of the whole to reproduce an impression which nature sometimes gives." The painters of the Hague School used muted tones and more diffuse brushstrokes to add a sense of weather and often somber moods to their landscapes and genre scenes.

=== Interactions with the Van Gogh family ===
The van de Sande Bakhuyzens were related to the famed Van Gogh family through Hendrik's grandfather Hendrik Bakhuyzen, who married Jannetje van Gogh (1731–1796). Hendrik taught Vincent van Gogh's mother Anna Carbentus van Gogh to paint, and Vincent van Gogh felt that there was clear thematic convergence among his work and that of the van de Sande Bakhuyzen's. In his 23 December 1889 letter to his mother from the San Remy-de-Provence asylum he wrote:

"And now it's certain that the work they're making here at present is very different — more colourful and more forthrightly drawn than what people used to do in Holland in the time of Schelfhout, say. And yet the one is so much a consequence of the other. For example, you knew the old Van de Sande Bakhuyzen and Jules Bakhuyzen. I thought of their work only recently, that with all the apparent difference there's still so little change in people's ideas. Anyway I believe that Jules Bakhuyzen, say, would understand perfectly what I paint these days, that ravine with the stream, and another painting — of the park at the asylum — large pine trees against an evening sky."

— Vincent van Gogh

In his letters, Vincent van Gogh notes that the sketches he observed by Pieter ter Meulen in 1881 were much better than when he had observed Ter Meulen "struggling and swotting" in Bakhuyzen's studio.

=== Family recognition ===
In 1996 the Bakhuyzen family was entered in the Nederland's Patriciaat or Blue Book, recognizing families who have been leading members of society for 150 years and six generations.

=== Prominent students ===
- Willem Roelofs, a founder of the Hague School, studied with v.d.S. Bakhuyzen starting 1839.
- Julius van de Sande Bakhuyzen, a founder of the Hague School
- Gerardina Jacoba van de Sande Bakhuyzen
- François Pieter ter Meulen
- Hubertus van Hove
- Jacob Jan van der Maaten
- Jan Willem van Borselen
- Anna Corbentus van Gogh
- Willem Antonie van Deventer
- Jan Hendrik Weissenbruch
- Pieter Stortenbeker
- Marie Bilders-van Bosse
- Alexander Hieronymus Bakhuyzen

== Sources ==
- Leeuw, Ronald de; Sillervis, John and Dumas, Charles (1983): The Hague School: Dutch Masters of the Nineteenth Century, Weidenfeld and Nicolson, London, ISBN 978-0-297-78219-3.
- Marius, G. Hermine (1908), Dutch Painting in the Nineteenth Century, translated by Alexander Teixeira de Mattos, De La More Press, ISBN 978-1-4179-6449-9
