= Van der Zande =

Van der Zande is a Dutch surname. Notable people with the surname include:

- Janus van der Zande (1924–2016), Dutch marathon runner
- Renger van der Zande (born 1986), Dutch racing driver

== See also ==
- Van de Sande
