= Gerardina Jacoba van de Sande Bakhuyzen =

Dutch painter (1826-1895)

Gerardine van de Sande Bakhuyzen
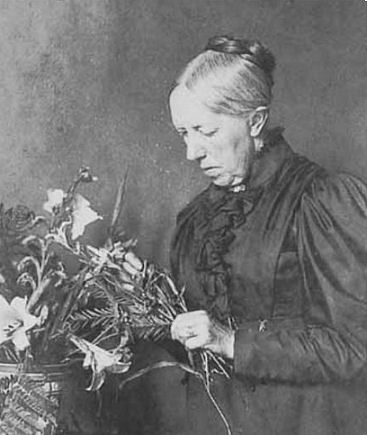
- Gerardine van de Sande Bakhuyzen
- Born: 27 July 1826; The Hague, Netherlands
- Died: 19 September 1895 (aged 69); The Hague, Netherlands
- Known for: Painting

Gerardina Jacoba van de Sande Bakhuyzen (27 July 1826–19 September 1895) was a 19th-century painter from the Northern Netherlands.

== Biography ==
She was born into a family of painters in The Hague to Hendrik van de Sande Bakhuyzen and Sophia Wilhelmine Kiehl. Gerardina van de Sande Bakhuyzen and her brother Julius were taught to paint by their famous father, Hendrik. She is known for still lifes, mostly of flowers, and fruits.

From childhood she painted flowers, and for a time this made no special impression on her family or friends, as it was not an uncommon occupation for girls. At length her father saw that this daughter, Gerardina—for he had numerous daughters, and they all desired to be artists—had talent, and when, in 1850, the Minerva Academy at Groningen gave out "Roses and Dahlias" as a subject, and offered a prize of a little more than ten dollars for the best example, he encouraged Gerardina to enter the contest. She received the contemptible reward, and found, to her astonishment, that the Minerva Academy considered the picture as belonging to them."

In 1904, Clara Erskine Clement wrote about Gerardina's "Silver medal at The Hague, 1857; The Hague School: Introduction honorary medal at Amsterdam, 1861; another at The Hague, 1863; and a medal of distinction at the International Colonial and Export Exhibition, in 1883. Daughter of the well-known animal painter."

== International exhibitions ==
Bakhuyzen exhibited her work at three and possibly more International Exhibitions. In 1880 she sent paintings to the Melbourne International Exhibition (1880). Consequently she received a letter from an art collector on the other side of the world who later ordered a painting - on 2 November 1881 she wrote, "Dear Sir, By the kindness of Capt.Schagen van Leeuwin, I have received this week your letter and I am much pleased that you approved of my paintings" and in 1882, "Dear Sir, I have the pleasure to write to you that I have sent away the three pictures you wished me to make for you, I have sent them to Mr.Ploos van Amstel who will have the kindness of delivering them to you."

In Amsterdam she participated in the International Colonial and Export Exhibition in 1883.

Several years later she exhibited at the Palace of Fine Arts for the 1893 World's Columbian Exposition in Chicago, Illinois.

Gerardine van de Sande Bakhuyzen died at the Hague in 1895.

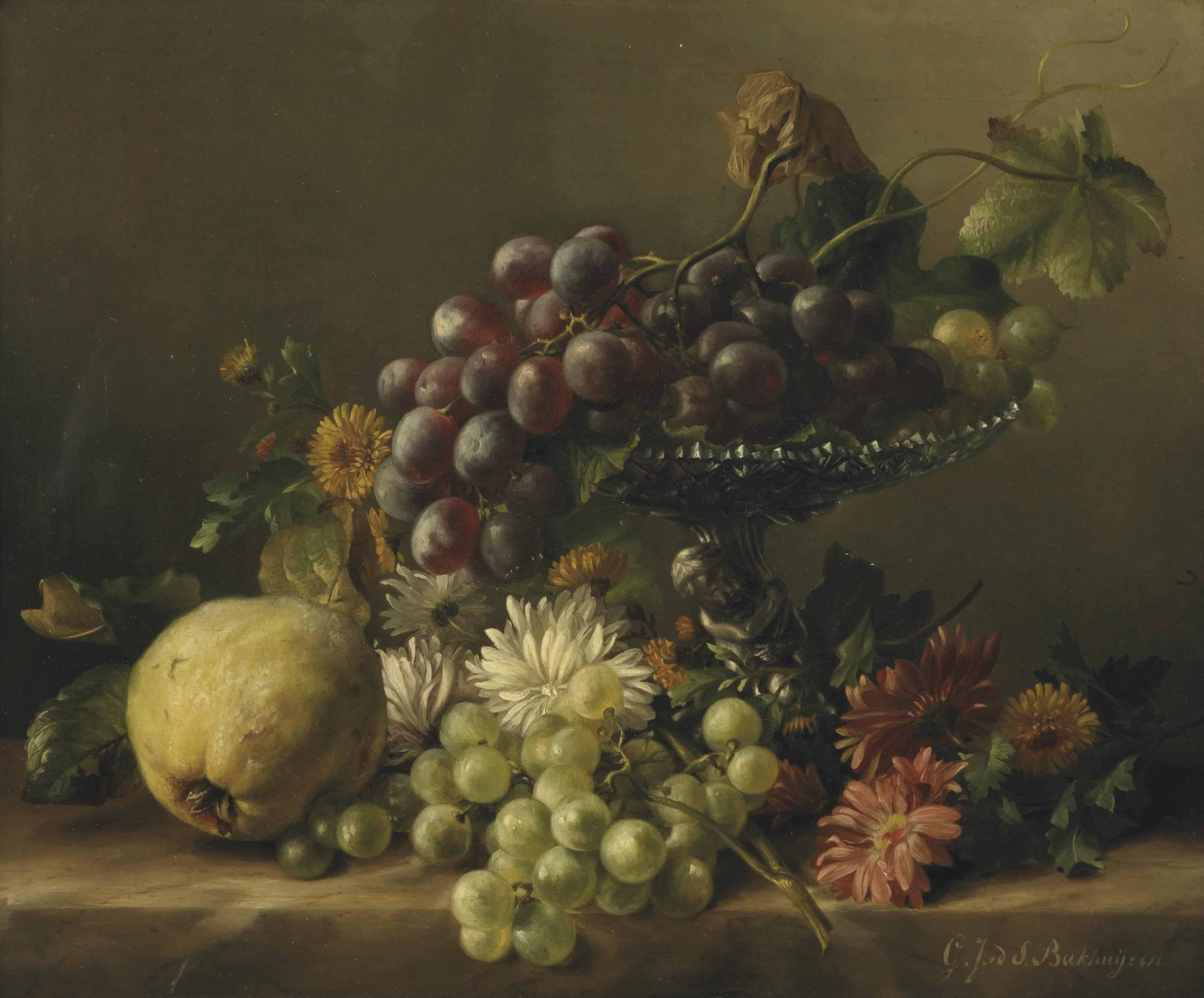
A quince with dandelions, daisies and grapes

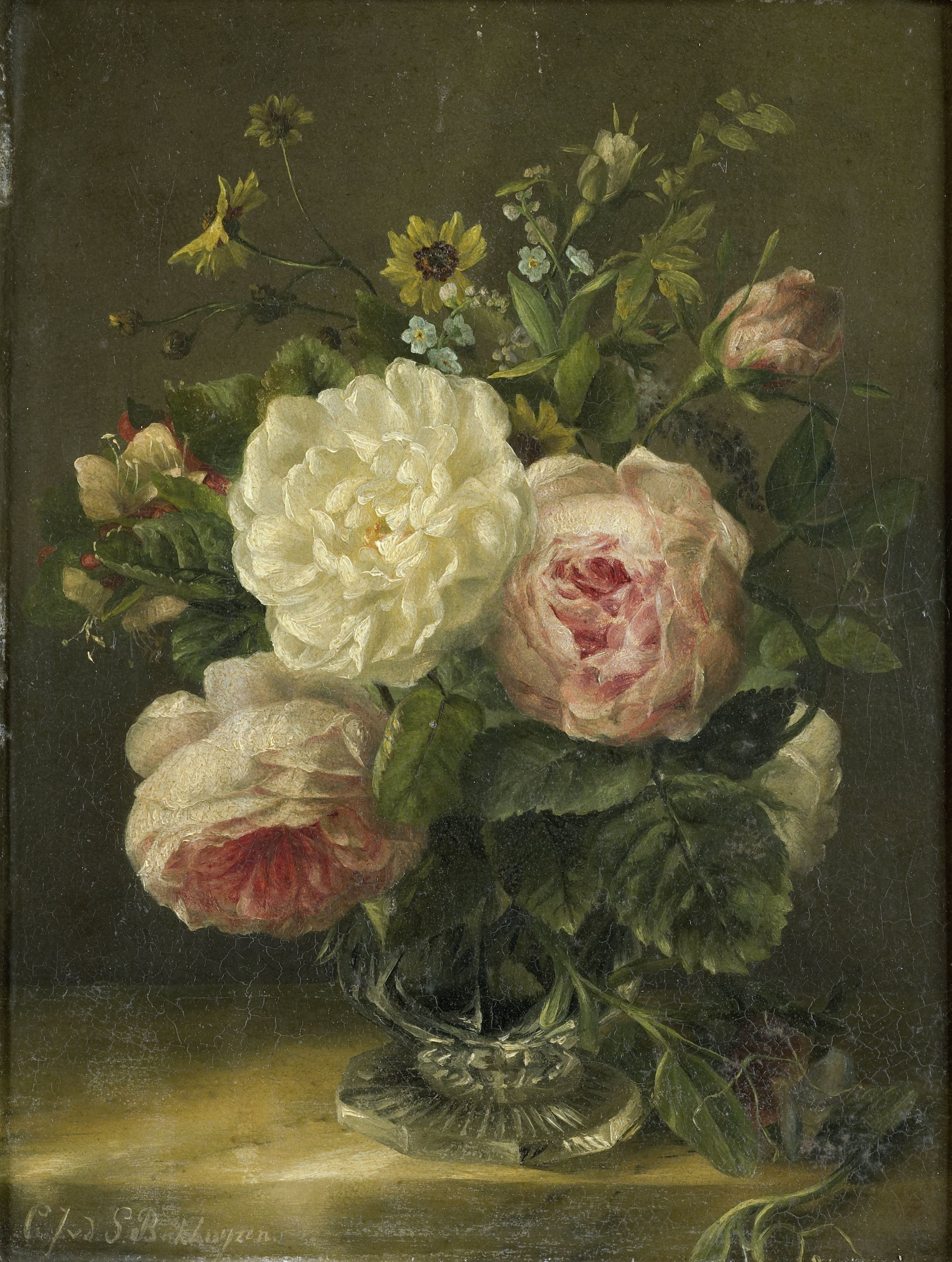
Still life of flowers in a vase

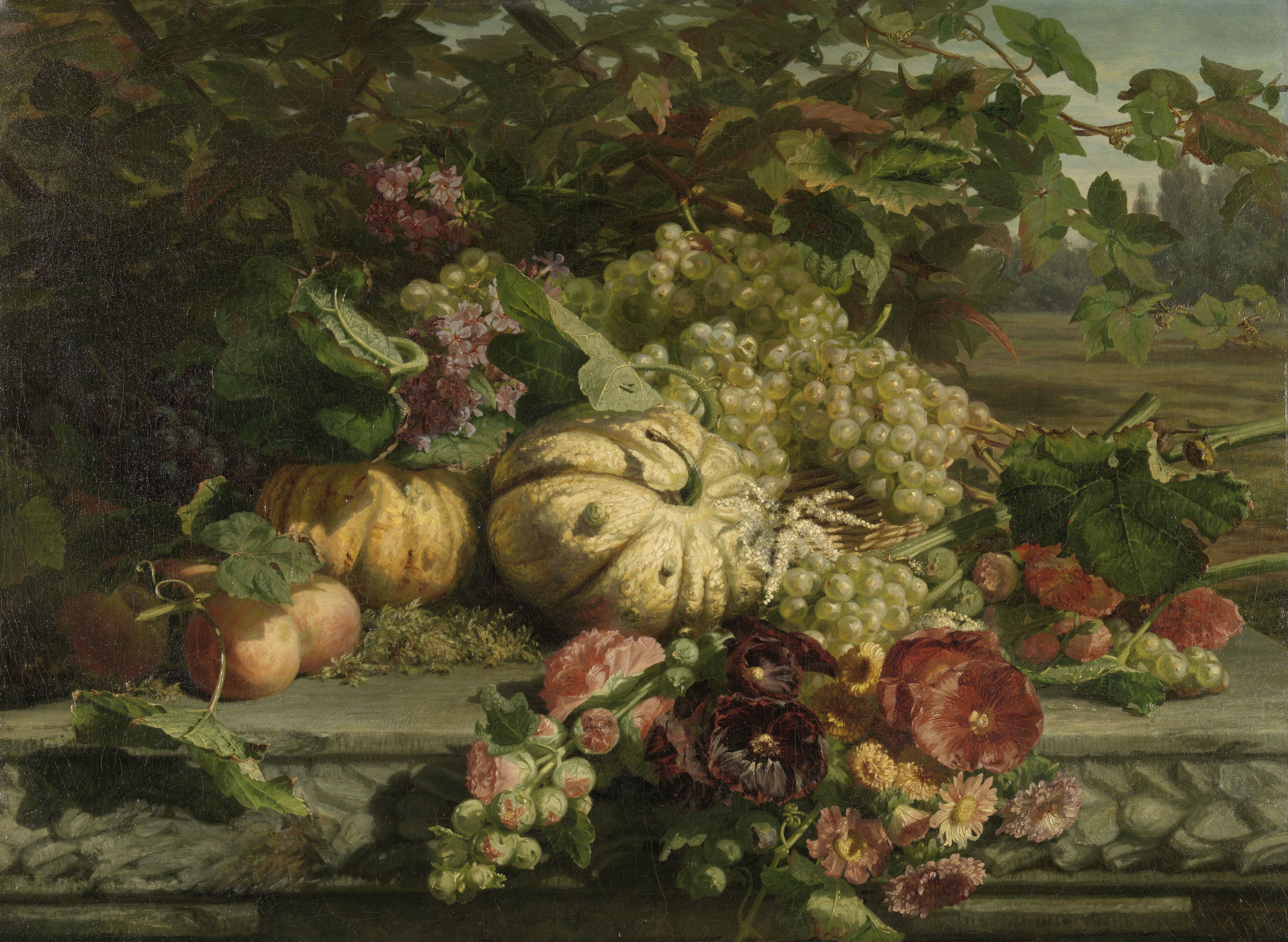
Stil life with flowers and fruit, 1869

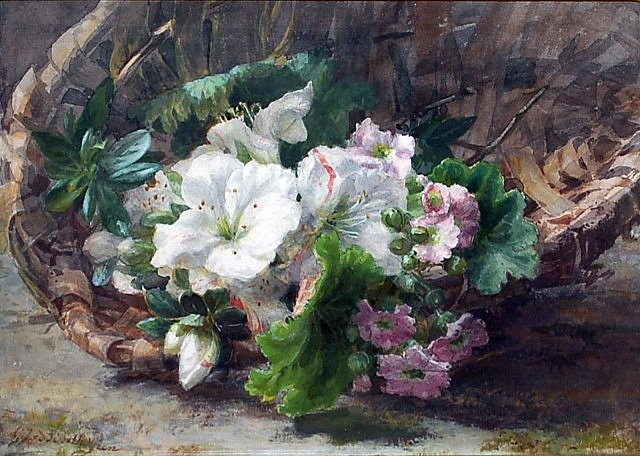
Flowers in a basket (watercolor)

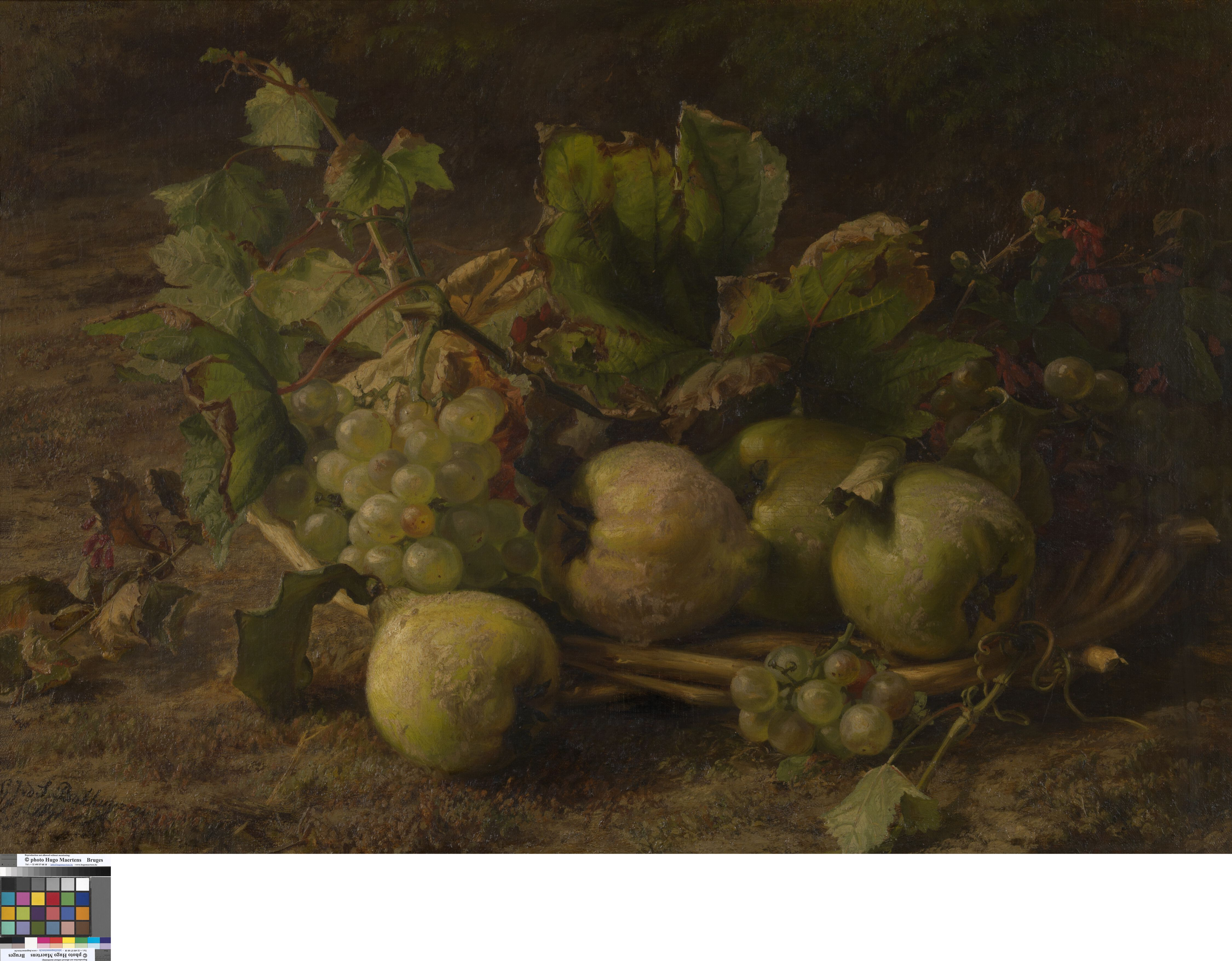
Autumn fruits, Museum of Fine Arts, Ghent
