= Jacob Jan van der Maaten =

Dutch painter and etcher (1820–1879)

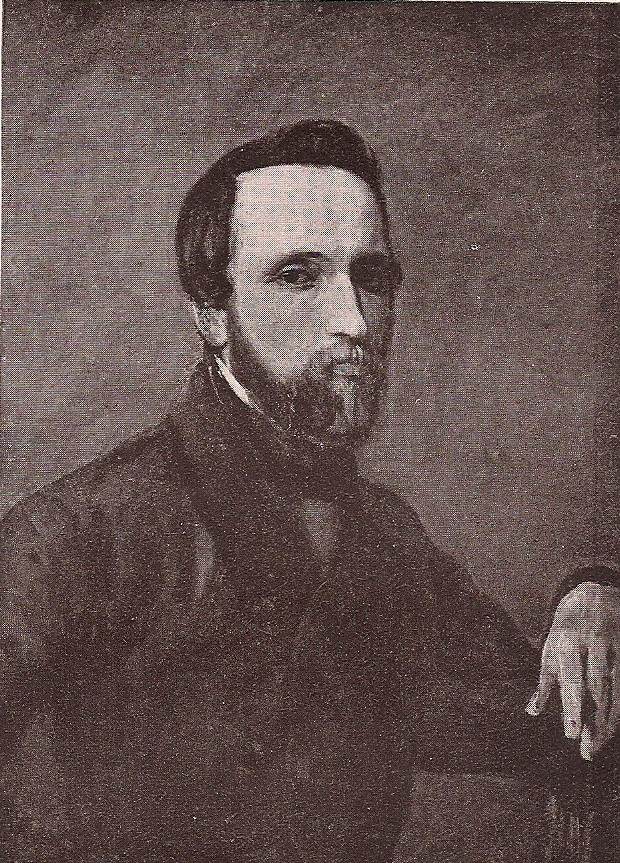
- J.J. van der Maaten
- Born: 4 January 1820; Elburg, Netherlands
- Died: 16 April 1879 (aged 59); Apeldoorn, Netherlands

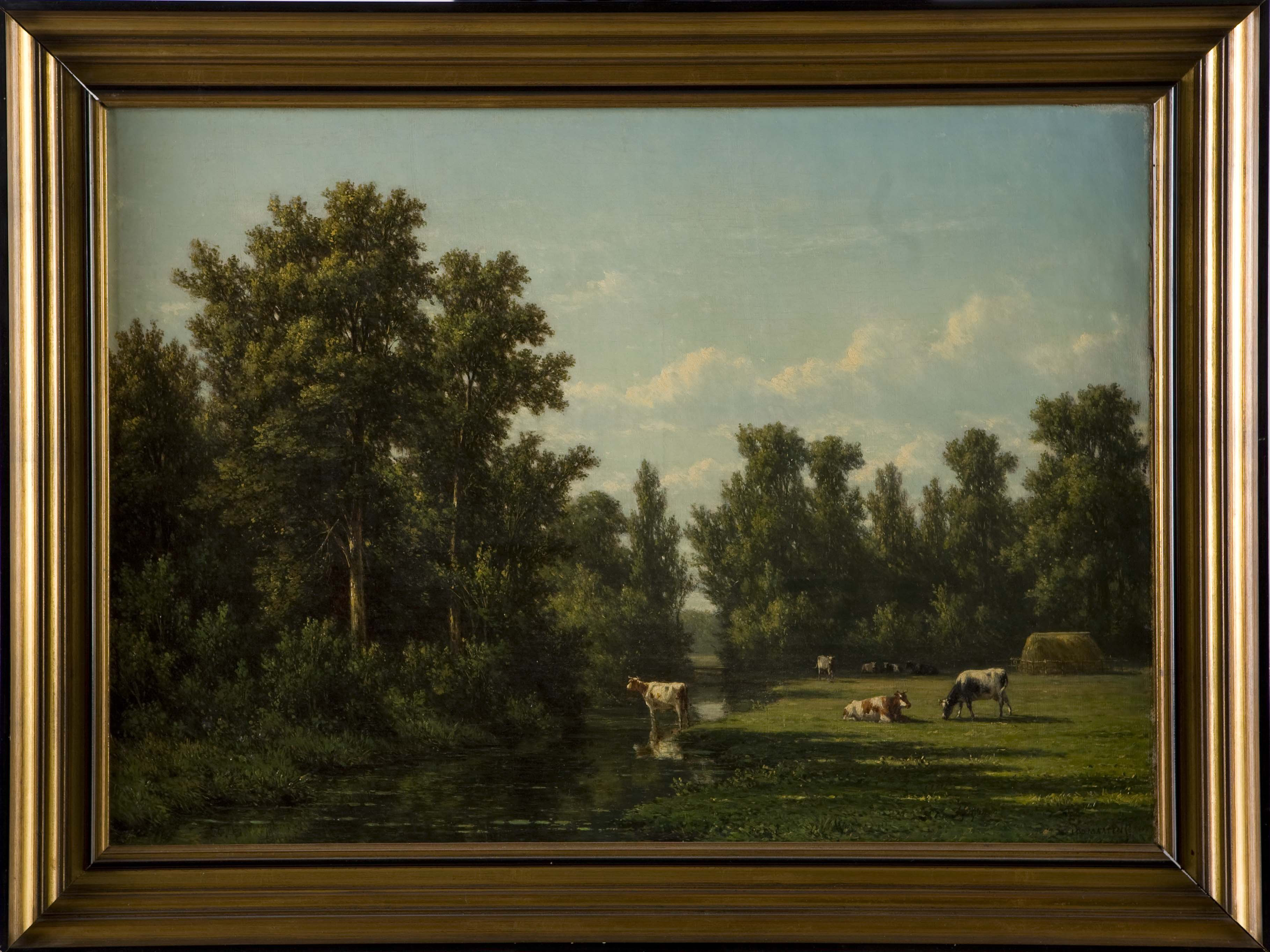
J.J. van der Maaten, Museum Elburg

Jacob Jan van der Maaten (4 January 1820 in Elburg – 16 April 1879 in Apeldoorn) was a Dutch painter and etcher. Van der Maaten was a pupil of Hendrikus van de Sande Bakhuyzen and studied at the Royal Academy of Art, The Hague. In 1852 he became a member of the Royal Academy of Fine Arts in Amsterdam. Later, Van der Maaten became teacher at the so-called King's School in Apeldoorn (1866–1879).

Van der Maaten was a landscape painter who captured summer landscapes in bright colors (much green and manganese blue), usually with some figures and cattle. He worked in The Hague (1843–1852), Amsterdam (1854–1855), The Hague (1857–1864) and in Apeldoorn (until 1879).

Van der Maaten was one of the founders of Pulchri Studio in The Hague, along with Jan Hendrik Weissenbruch, Jan Weissenbruch, Willem Roelofs, Jan Frederik van Deventer, Willem Antonie van Deventer and FH Michael.

Van der Maaten's masterpiece was “Begrafenis in het koren” (Burial in the cornfield), which in 1863 was the success of the exhibition in Brussels. Later it was exhibited at the International Exposition (1867) in Paris. Vincent van Gogh admired this painting so much that he had a reproduction of it on the wall. Vincent van Gogh referred in several letters to his brother Theo van Gogh to the work of Van der Maaten.

The Rijksmuseum Amsterdam, Kröller-Müller Museum in Otterlo, Gemeentemuseum Den Haag, Groninger Museum, Museum Boijmans van Beuningen in Rotterdam, CODA Museum Apeldoorn and Museum Elburg have paintings of Van der Maaten.

== Bibliography ==
- J.Winkler Prins, 'J.J. van de Maaten', De Leeswijzer 2 (1885/1886), p. 303–305
- G.H.Marius, De Hollandsche schilderkunst in de negentiende eeuw, 's-Gravenhage 1920, p. 69
- J.Knoef, 'J.J. van der Maaten(1820–1879)', Maandblad voor beeldende kunsten (1928), p. 141–149
- J.Knoef, Een eeuw Nederlandse schilderkunst, Amsterdam 1948, p. 87
- R. de Leeuw, J. Sillevis, Ch. Dumas, cat.tent. De Haagse School – Hollandse Meesters van de 19de eeuw, Parijs (Grand Palais), Londen (Royal Academy), Den Haag (Haags Gemeentemuseum) 1983, p. 53 en passim
- P. Schrier, 'De Haagsche Etsclub', Jaarboek Die Haghe 1992, p. 29–53; p. 47
- H.J. Kraaij, Charles Leickert,1816–1907: Painter of the Dutch Landscapes, Schiedam 1996, p. 22,41,45
- C. Stolwijk, Uit de schilderswereld. Nederlandse kunstschilders in de tweede helft van de negentiende eeuw, Leiden 1998, p. 306,339,343
- R. den Hartog, Groet Molletje van mij. Alexander Mollinger (1836–1867), een Utrechts schilder op de drempel van de Haagse School, Vianen 2008, p. 66, 67
- De Schilderkunst der Lage Landen, deel 3, Amsterdam University Press, 2007, p. 45
- Lexicon Nederlandse Beeldende Kunstenaars 1750–1880, herzien door P.Scheen, 1981, p. 328
