= Clara Erskine Clement =

American novelist

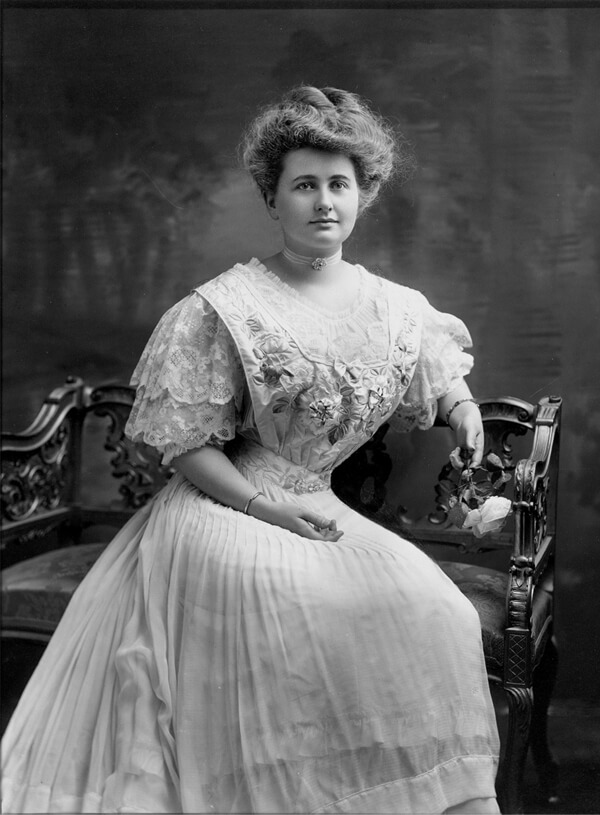
- Born: August 28, 1834; St. Louis
- Died: February 29, 1916 (aged 81)
- Occupation: Historian, writer

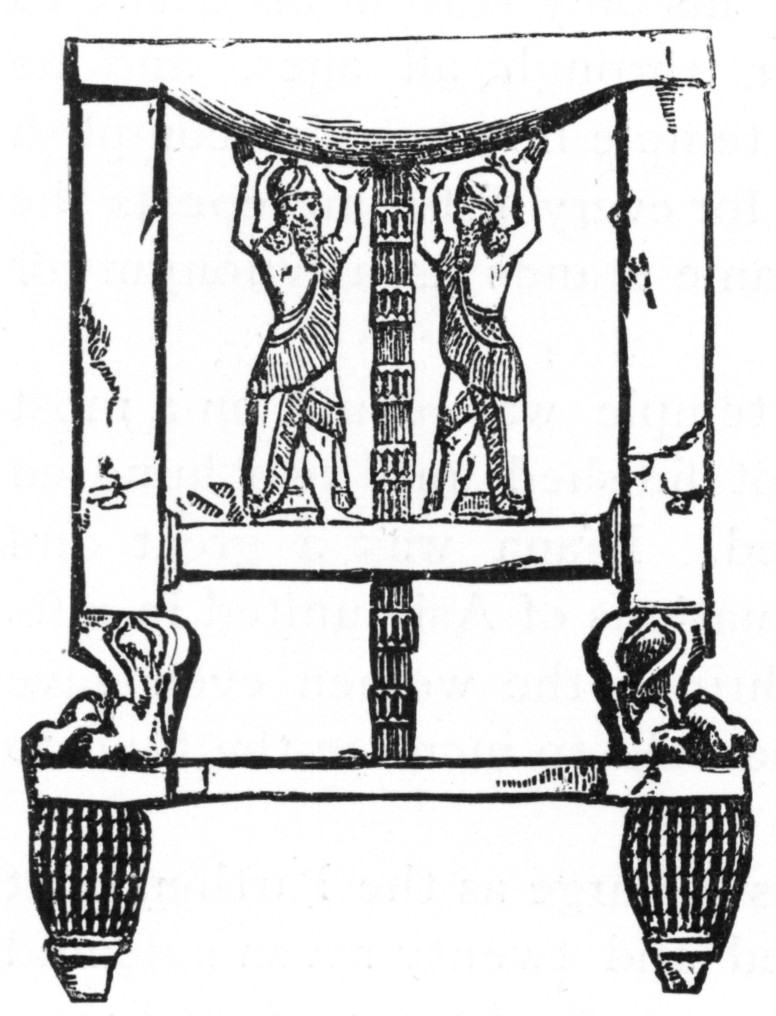
From "A History of Art for Beginners and Students: Vol. 3, Architecture" (1891) by Clara Erskine Clement

Clara Erskine Clement Waters (August 28, 1834, in St. Louis, Missouri – February 29, 1916, in Brookline, Massachusetts) was an American author and traveler.

== Early life ==
On August 28, 1834, Clement was born as Clara Erskine in St. Louis, Missouri. Clement's father was John Erskine, a businessman. Clement's mother was Harriet Bethiah (Godfrey) Erskine. She was educated at home by private tutors.

== Career ==
Clement's writing career began in 1869 with the privately printed work, Simple Story of the Orient.

== Personal life ==
In 1852, Clement married James Hazen Clement, a businessman. They moved to Newton, Massachusetts. After the death of her first husband, in 1882 Clement married Edwin Forbes Waters, author and owner of the Boston Daily Advertiser. They resided in Cambridge, Massachusetts.

Clement made extensive tours in Europe, visited Palestine and Turkey in 1868, and traveled round the world in 1883/4. Her travels continued later in life.

== Selected works ==
- Simple Story of the Orient, her first work, printed privately (1869)
- Handbook of Legendary and Mythological Art (Boston, 1871)
- Painters, Sculptors, Architects, Engravers, and their Works (1874; 9th ed., 1892)
- Artists of the Nineteenth Century and their Works, with Laurence Hutton (1879)
- Eleanor Maitland, a novel (1881)
- Life of Charlotte Cushman (1882)
- History of Egypt (1880)
- Hand-Books of Painting, Sculpture, and Architecture (3 vols., 1883–86)
- Christian Symbols and Stories of the Saints (1886)
- Stories of Art and Artists (1886)
- A History of Art for Beginners and Students: Painting, Sculpture, Architecture (1887)
- The Queen of the Adriatic or Venice, Mediaeval and Modern (1893)
- Naples: The City of Parthenope and Its Environs (1894)
- Constantinople: The City of Sultans (1895)
- Angels in Art (1899)
- Women Artists in Europe and America (1903)
- Women in the fine arts, from the Seventh Century B.C. to the Twentieth Century A.D. (1904)
- Women in the Fine Arts (1906)

She also translated a volume of Kenan's lectures and Dosia's Daughter, a novel by Henri Gréville, and edited a translation of Carl von Lützow's Treasures of Italian Art.

== Notes ==
Attribution
