= Julius van de Sande Bakhuyzen =

Dutch painter

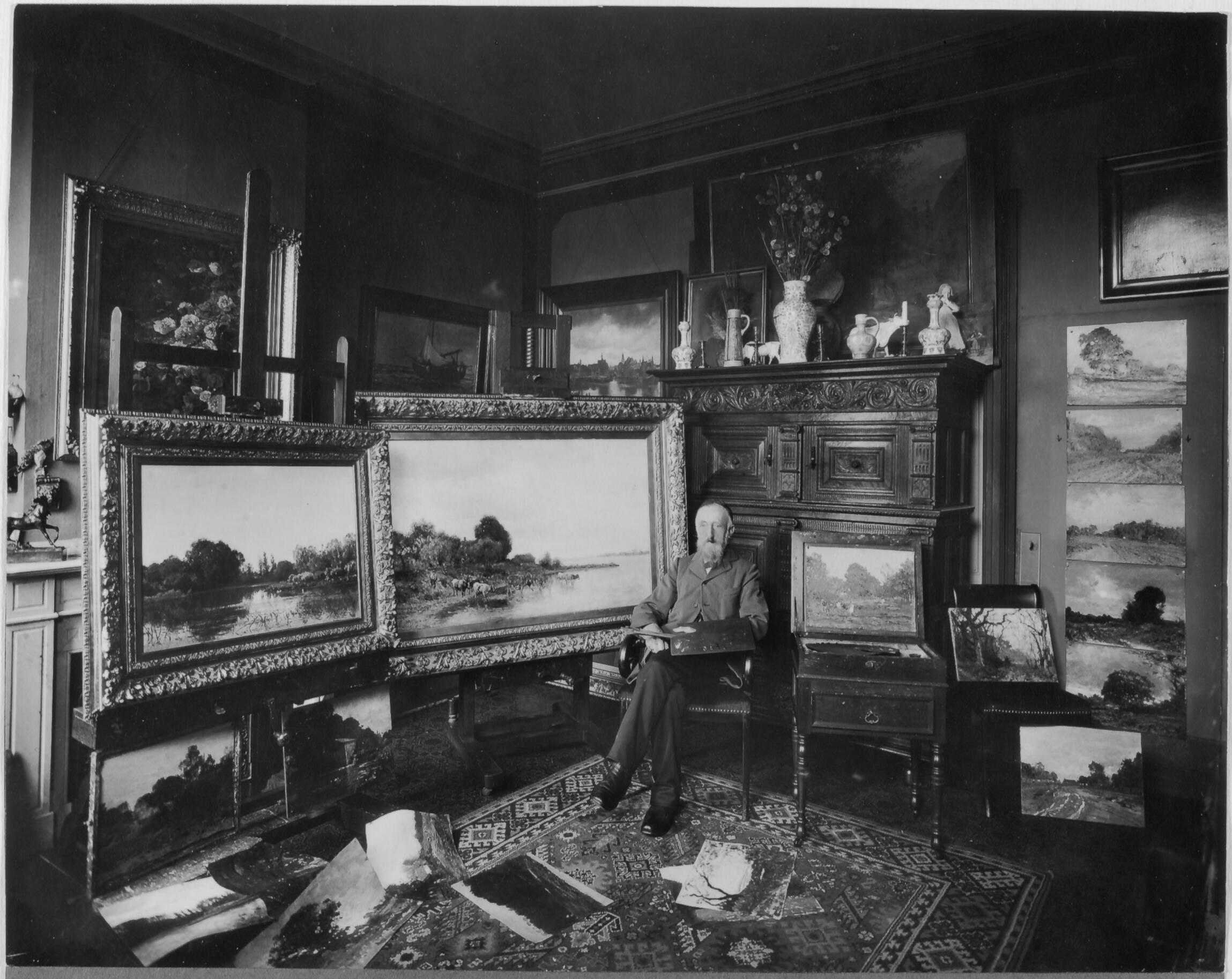
Van de Sande Bakhuyzen in his atelier (1903).

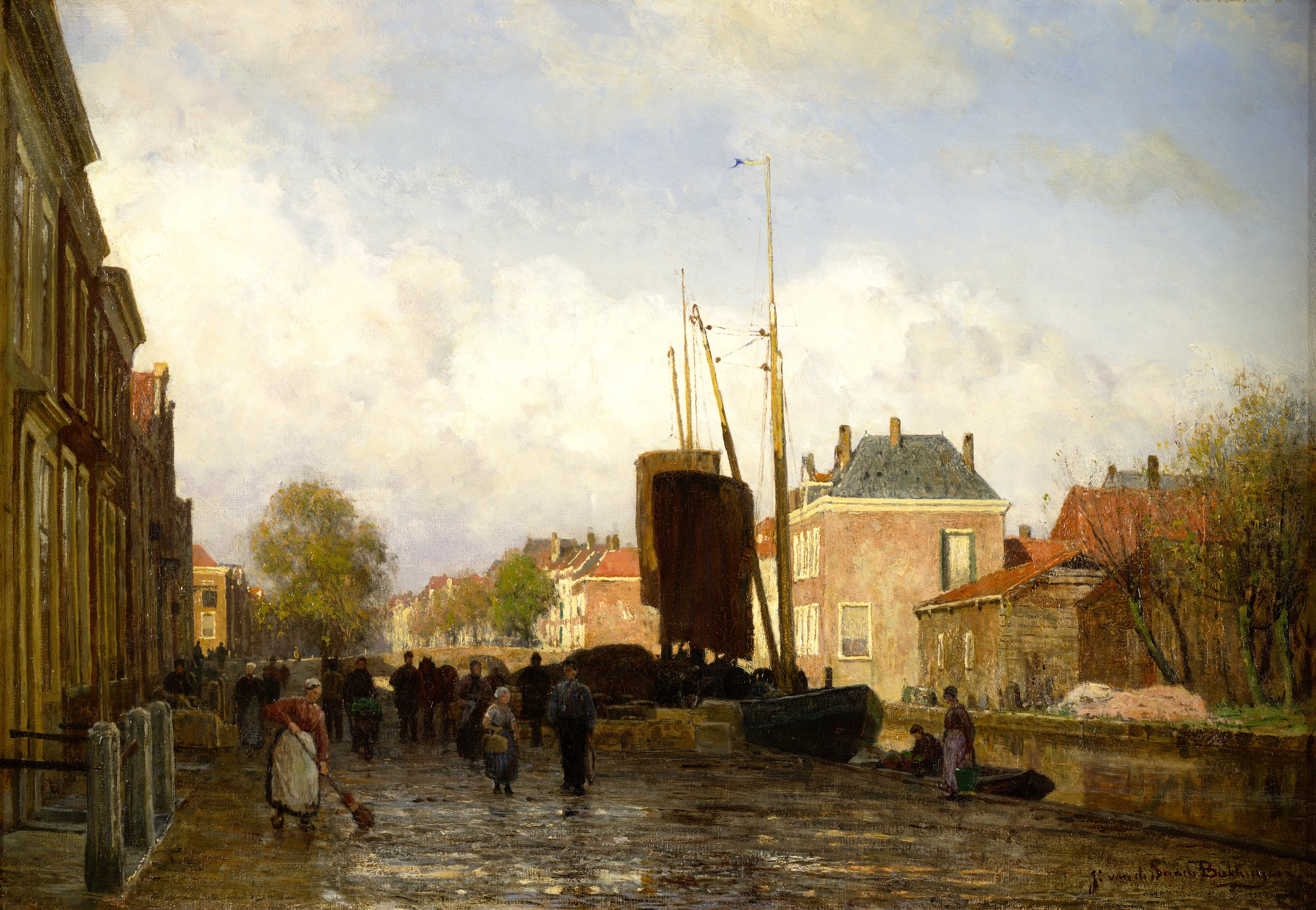
Het Zieken in Den Haag

Julius Jacobus van de Sande Bakhuyzen (18 June 1835, in The Hague – 21 October 1925, in The Hague) was a Dutch etcher and painter in the Hague School. He was a member of a number of artists' associations, such as Arti et Amicitiae and Pulchri Studio.

== Biography ==
Julius took his first art lessons from his father, Hendrik van de Sande Bakhuyzen, who was a painter. Julius studied at the Royal Academy of Art in The Hague. In 1871 he won the royal medal at an exhibition in Amsterdam with his painting 'Pond in the Hague Forest'. From 1875 he spent most summers in Drenthe, often with his sister Gerardine, who also painted. His works include mainly landscapes, with trees often playing a prominent role.

== Public collections ==
- Rijksmuseum Amsterdam

== Literature ==
- Bodt, S. de (1997) De Haagse School in Drenthe. Zwolle: Uitgeverij Waanders.
- Liefde-van Brakel, T. de (1997) Hendrikus, Gerardine en Julius van de Sande Bakhuyzen: Een Haagse schildersfamilie uit de negentiende eeuw. Zwolle.
