= Het Zand, Utrecht =

Utrecht

Coordinates: 52°5′36″N 5°2′45″E

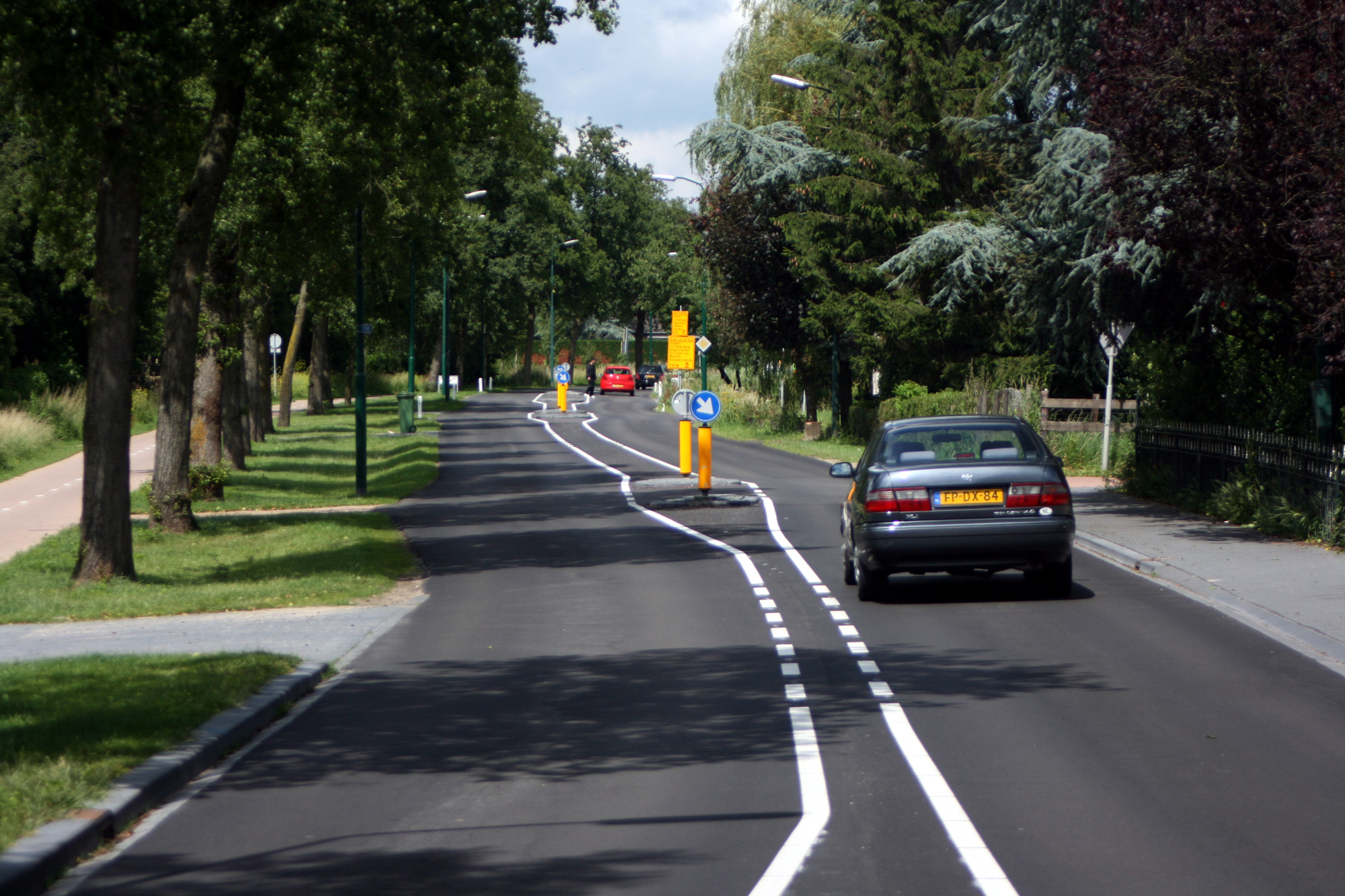
The road 't Zand in the Het Zand district, Leidsche Rijn, Utrecht

Het Zand (Dutch pronunciation: [ət ˈsɑnt]) is a hamlet in the Dutch province of Utrecht, in the municipality of Utrecht.
