= 't Zand, Nijmegen =

Coordinates: 51°52′36″N 5°52′15″E

't Zand
- Hamlet
- Location in the Netherlands
- Country: Netherlands
- Province: Gelderland
- Municipality: Nijmegen

't Zand is a hamlet in the Dutch province of Gelderland, in the municipality of Nijmegen.
