= Andreas Schelfhout =

Dutch painter and lithographer (1787-1870)

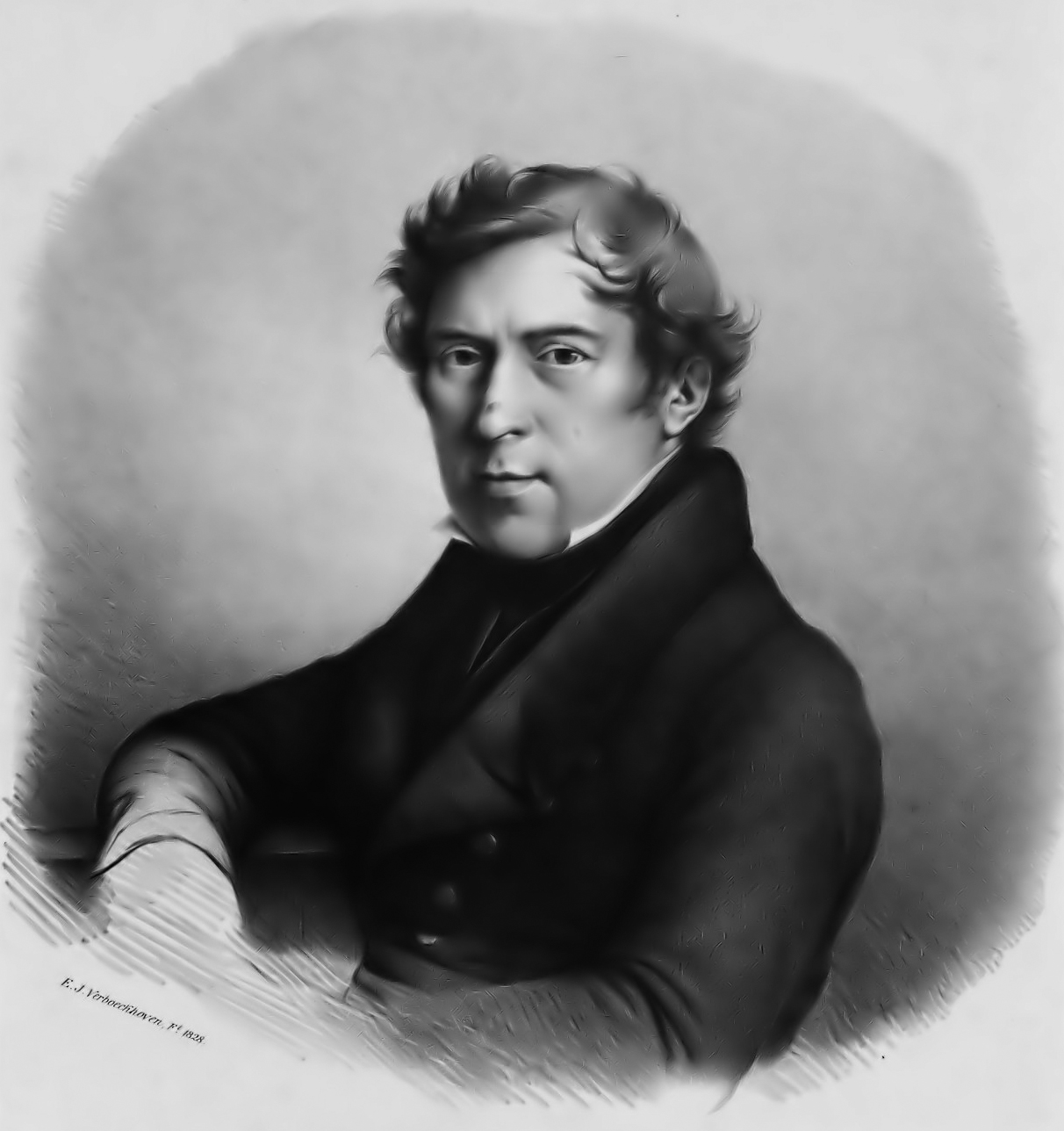
- Andreas Schelfhout, after Eugène Joseph Verboeckhoven
- Born: February 16, 1787; The Hague
- Died: April 19, 1870 (aged 83); The Hague
- Known for: Painting
- Movement: Romantic movement

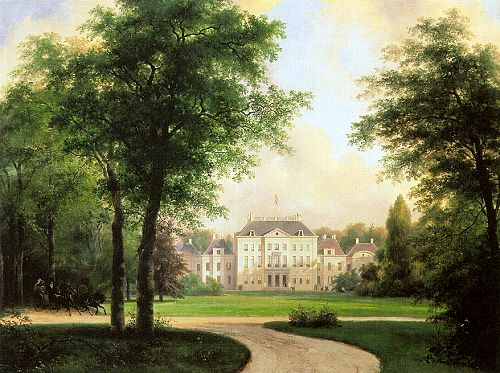
The Het Loo Palace, 1838

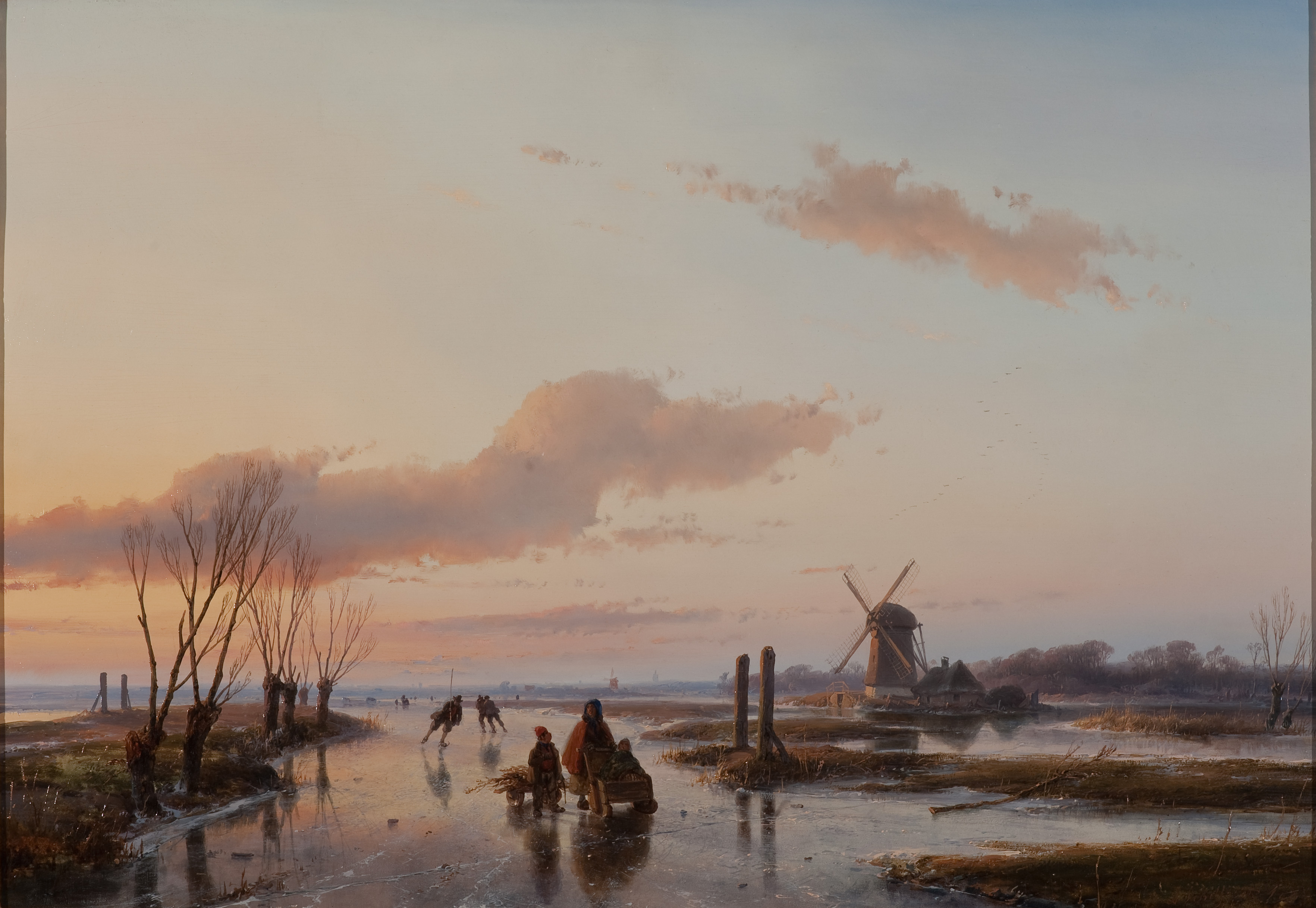
Frozen Waterway, 1845

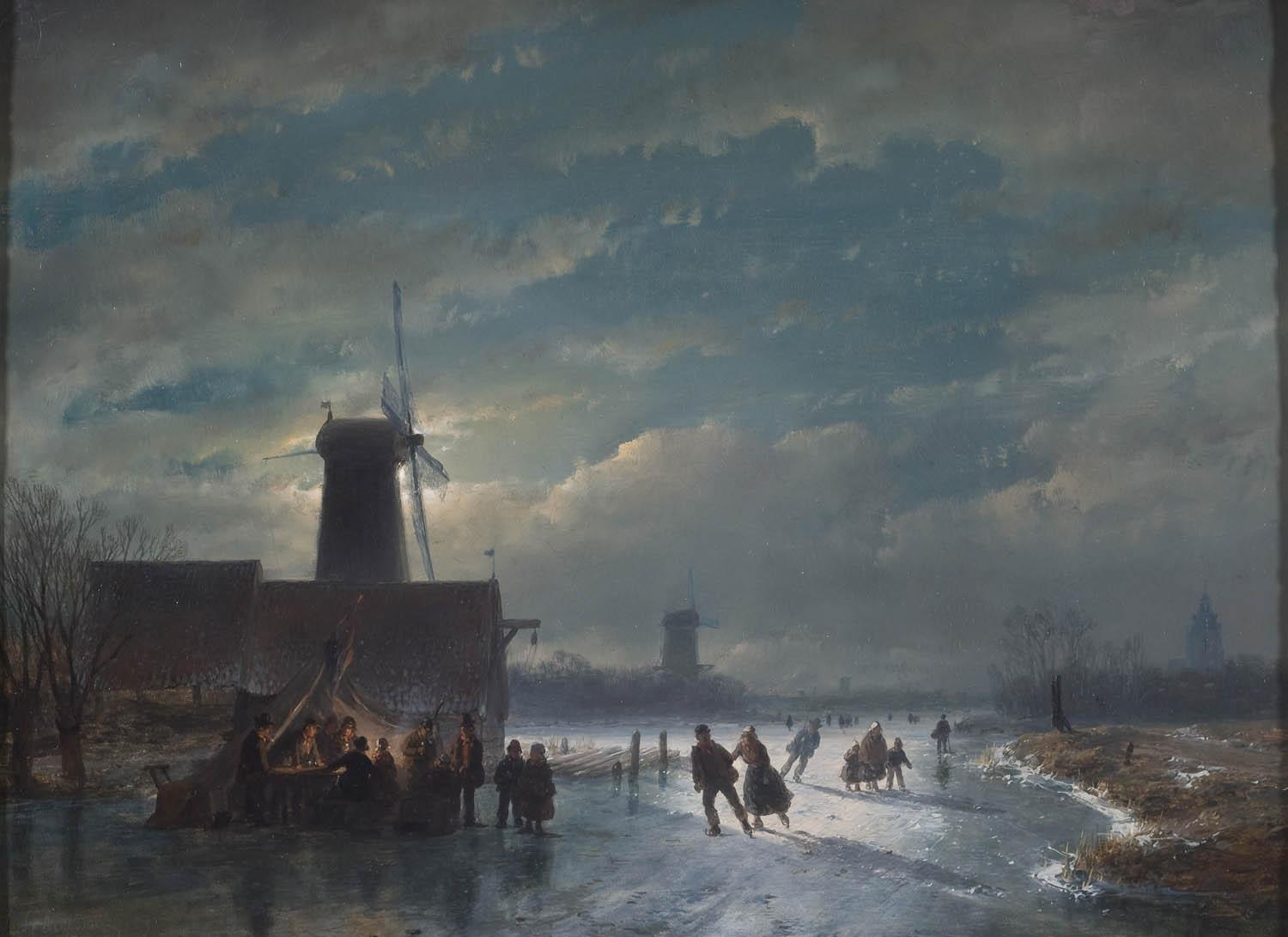
Winter Landscape with 'koek en zopie' at night, 1849

Andreas Schelfhout (1787–1870) was a Dutch painter, etcher and lithographer, known for his landscape paintings.

Schelfhout belongs to the Romantic movement. His Dutch winter scenes and frozen canals with skaters were already famous during his lifetime. He became one of the most influential Dutch landscape artists of his century.

== Biography ==
Schelfhout started as a house painter in the framing business of his father. He already started painting pictures in his spare time. After a well-received first exhibition in The Hague, his father sent him to receive proper training to Joannes Breckenheimer (1772–1856), a stage designer, in The Hague. He learned not only the technical aspects of painting, but also made detailed studies of the 17th-century Dutch landscape artists Meindert Hobbema and Jacob van Ruisdael.

In 1815, Schelfhout started his own workshop and became a member of the Pulchri studio. Through his technical excellence and sense of composition and his use of naturalistic colours, he soon became famous also outside The Hague. In 1819 he was awarded the Gold Medal at the exhibition in Antwerp. In 1818 he became a member of the Royal Academy for Visual Arts of Amsterdam. He reputation continued to grow and in 1822 he was given the rank of Fourth Class Correspondent of the Royal Dutch Institute. From then on, one exhibition followed after another.

Initially Schelfhout painted mainly summer scenes, beach scenes, and animal paintings. But as his initial winter scenes even had more success, he began to include them in his exhibitions. He was mainly a studio artist, relying on his sketches done en plein air. His sketchbook Liber Veritatis (Book of Truth) shows that he made about twenty paintings a year, among them a few foreign views. This indicated that he travelled abroad around 1825. In later years he visited France in 1833, England in 1835 (especially to study the works of John Constable) and Germany. In 1839 he was awarded the title Ridder in de orde van de Nederlandse Leeuw, and in 1844 he was awarded an honorary membership in Kunst zij ons doel.

Schelfhout provided training to many painters who would become famous in their own right : Johan Jongkind (one of the forerunners of the Impressionists), Charles Leickert, Johannes Josephus Destree, Jan Willem van Borselen, Nicholas Roosenboom, his daughter Margaretha and her husband Johannes Gijsbert Vogel, Willem Troost, the American Hudson River School Painter Louis Rémy Mignot and his son-in-law Wijnand Nuyen. He also occasionally painted with his friend Hendrik van de Sande Bakhuyzen, a prominent Romantic landscape painter, including at least one joint canvas that bears both of their signatures.

Schelfhout advocated the use of watercolour in en plein air sketching. His watercolours greatly influenced Jongkind, Jan Hendrik Weissenbruch and Willem Roelofs, the latter pair associated with the Hague School of painting and students of Hendrik van de Sande Bakhuyzen. Weissenbruch and Jongkind are especially recognized as masters of the technique. Schelfhout encouraged Weissenbruch and invited him to take lessons from him, but it is not clear whether Weissenbruch ever did.

At the end of his career Schelfhout put together a series of eighty landscape drawings, mainly recordings of previous paintings and watercolours. They were drawn in chalk and lightly coloured.

Schelfhout's death marked the end of the Romantic period in Holland. He is considered a precursor of the Hague School.

His paintings are on display in several leading museums :

- Rijksmuseum, Amsterdam
- Museum Boymans-van Beuningen, Rotterdam
- Dordrechts museum, Dordrecht
- Teylers Museum, Haarlem,
- Museum Jan Cunen, Oss
- KMSK, Antwerp
- MSK, Gent
- Groeningemuseum, Brugge
- National Gallery, London
- The Wallace Collection, London
- Tyne and Wear Museums

== Gallery of Works ==
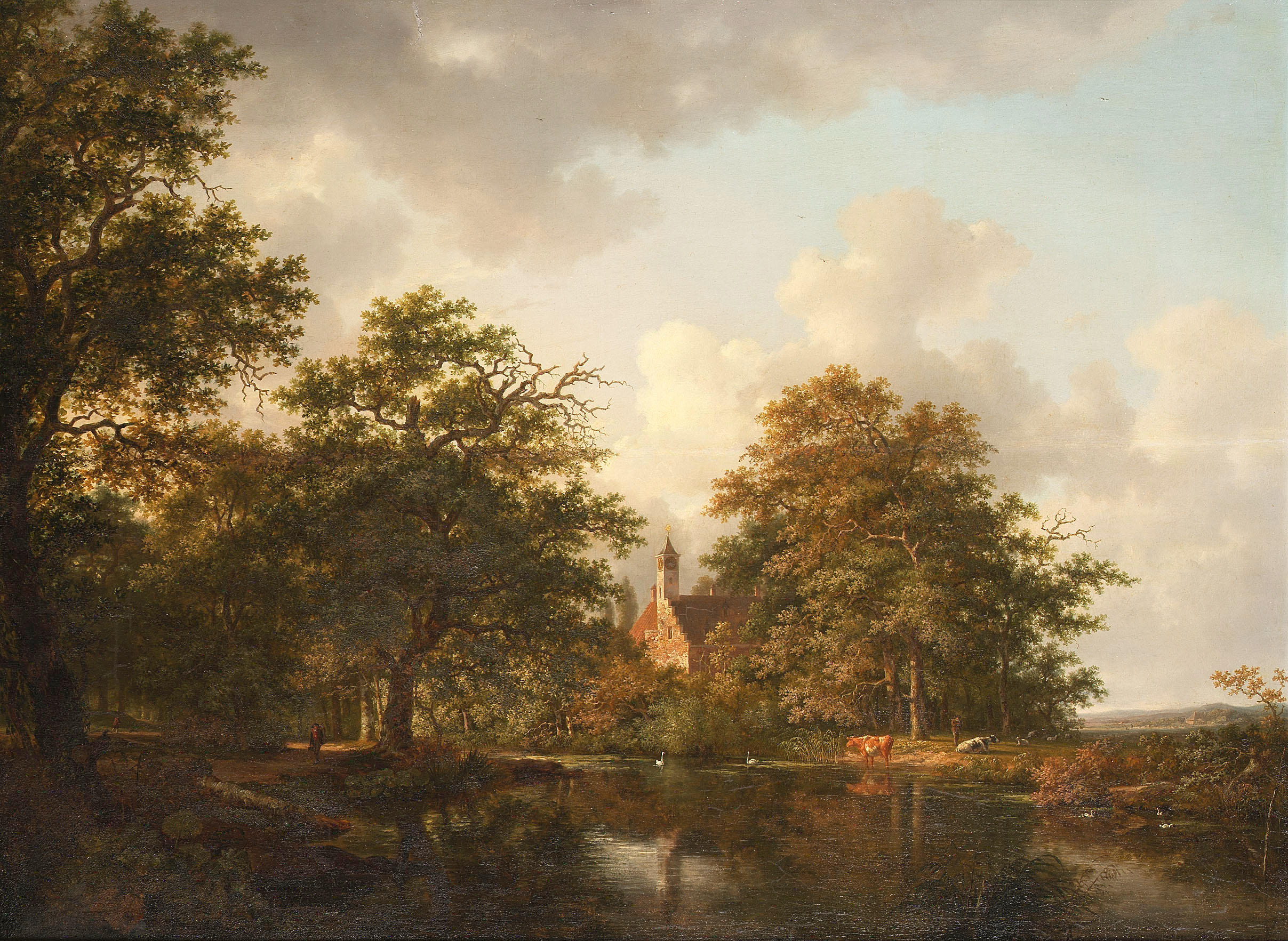
A. Schelfhout, Figures and cattle beside a lake in a wooded landscape, c. 1818; oil on panel

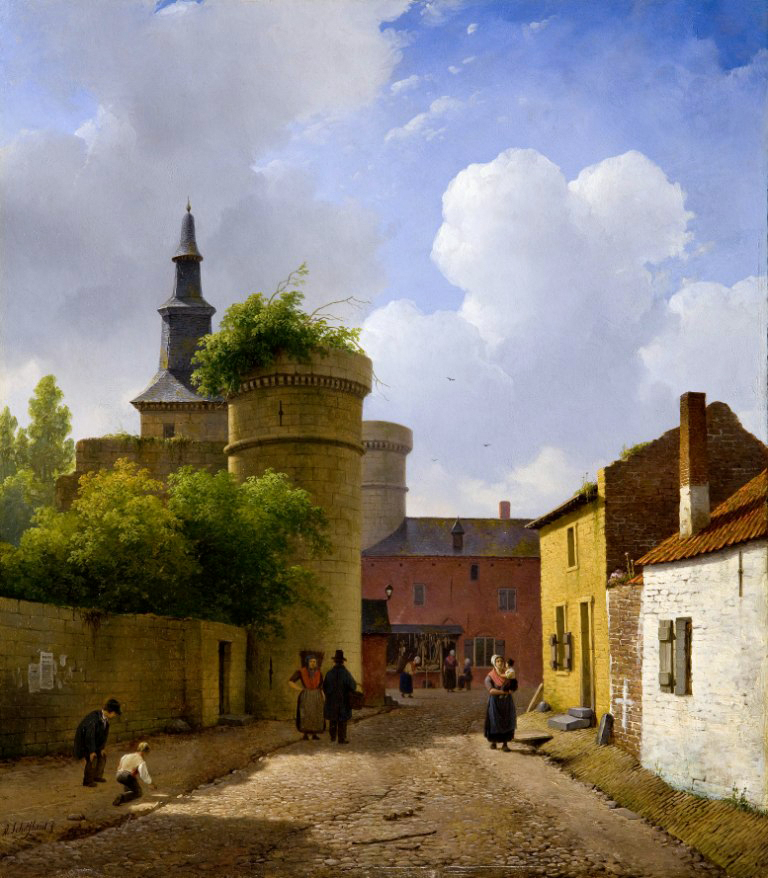
A. Schelfhout, Small street in Huy, Belgium, c. 1824; oil on panel

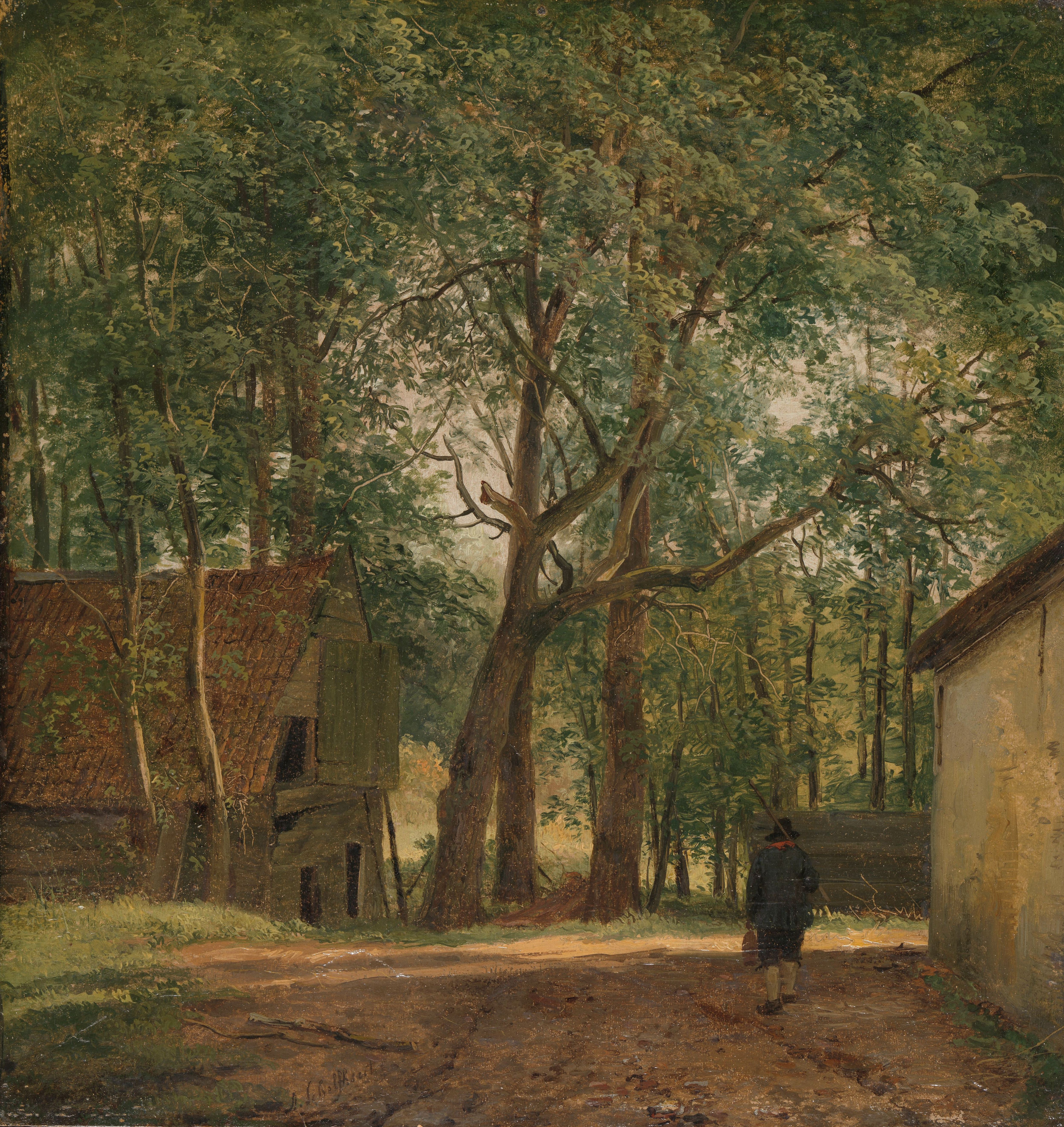
A. Schelfhout, Boerenschuur / Farmyard, c. 1820-30; oil on paper

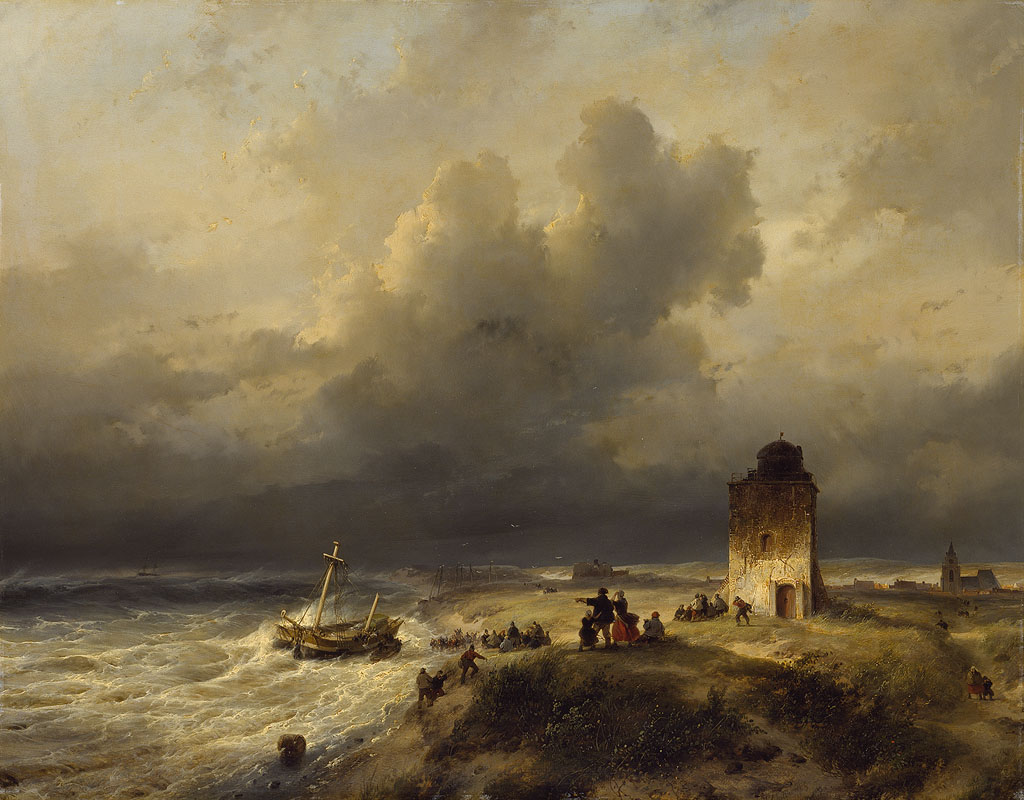
A. Schelfhout, Ship stranded at Scheveningen, 1837; oil on panel

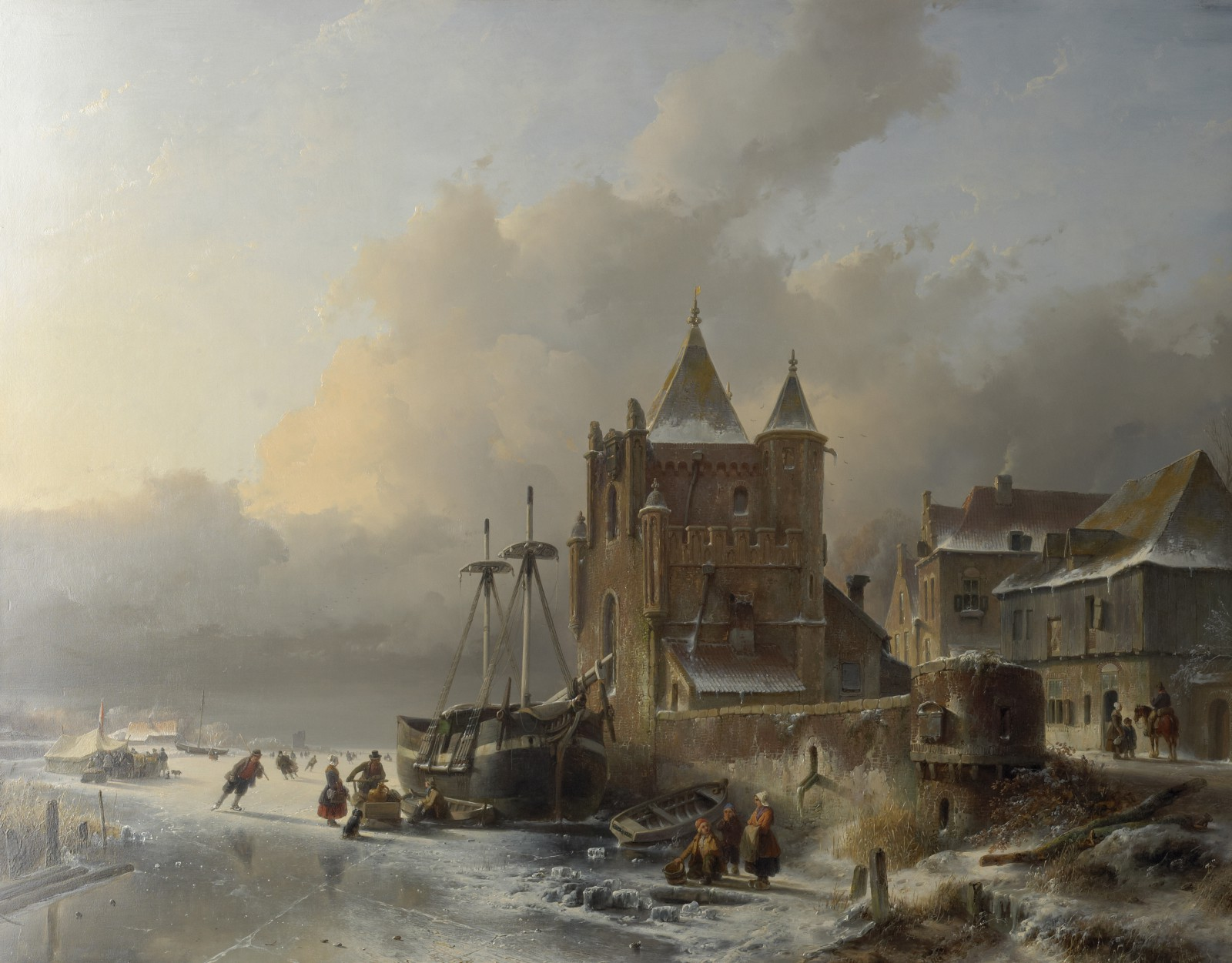
A. Schelfhout, Winter met schaatsers / Winter with skaters, 1838; oil on canvas

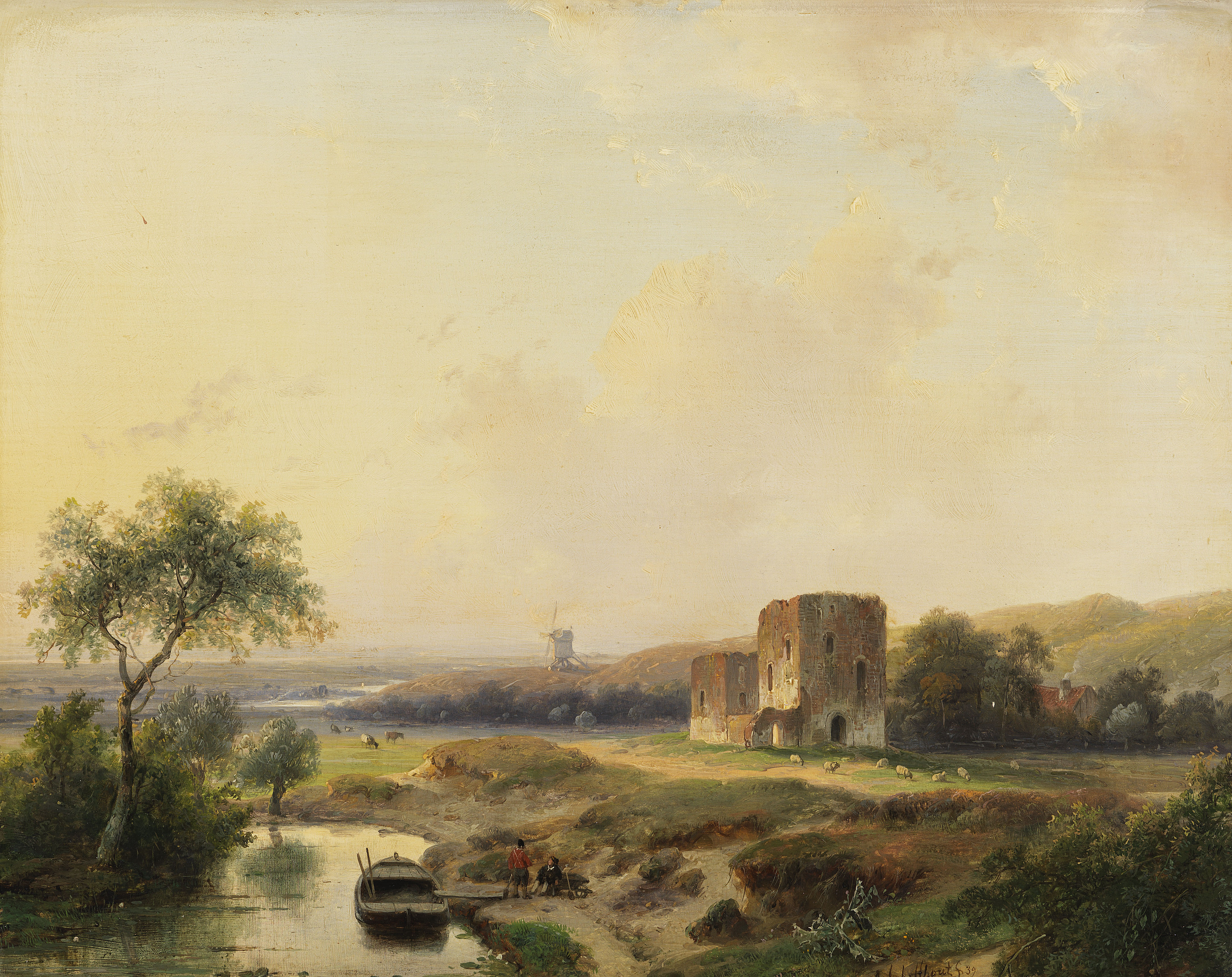
A. Schelfhout, River landscape near Haarlem with windmill and the ruins of Brederode, 1839; oil on panel

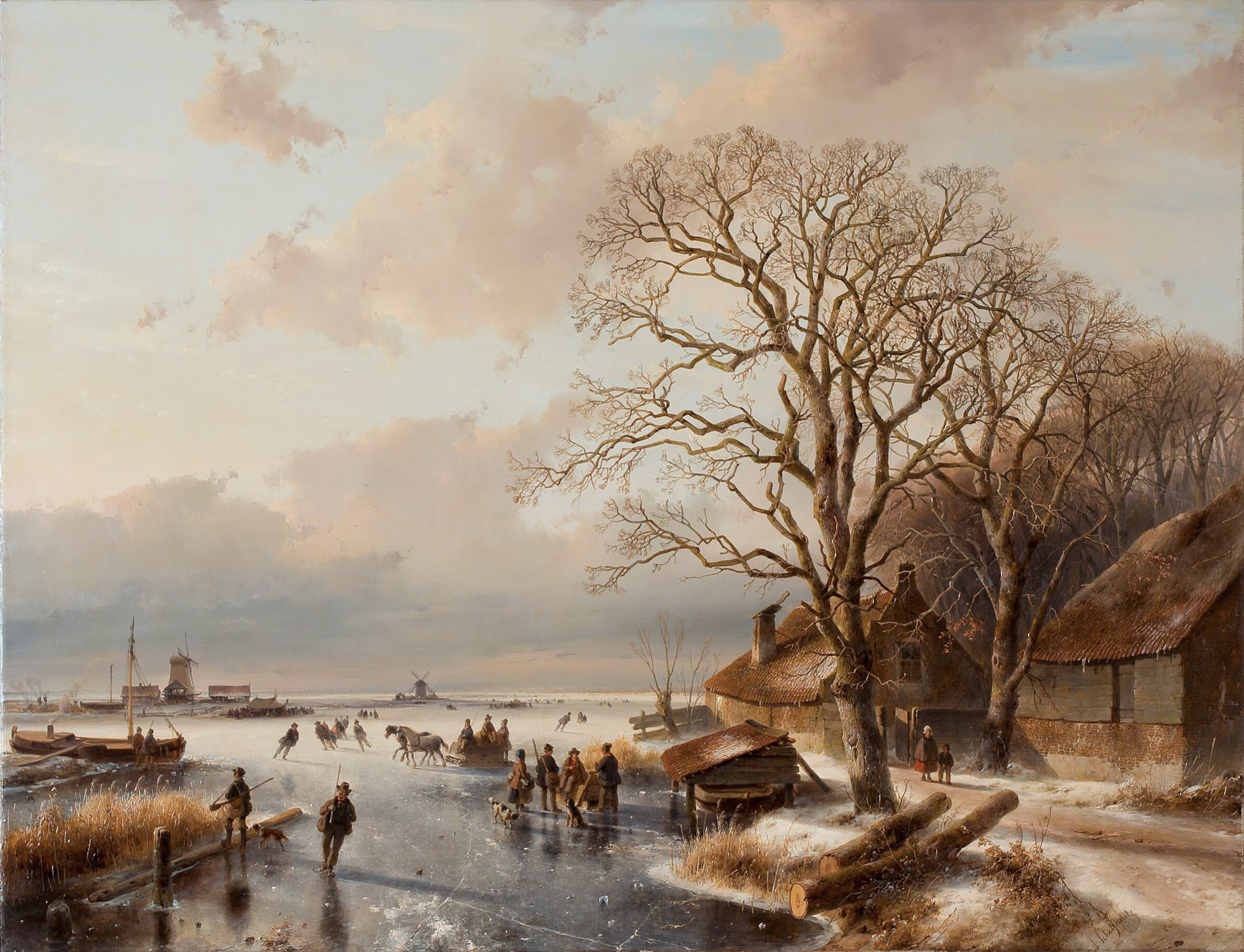
A. Schelfhout, 1841: Winter landscape, oil on canvas

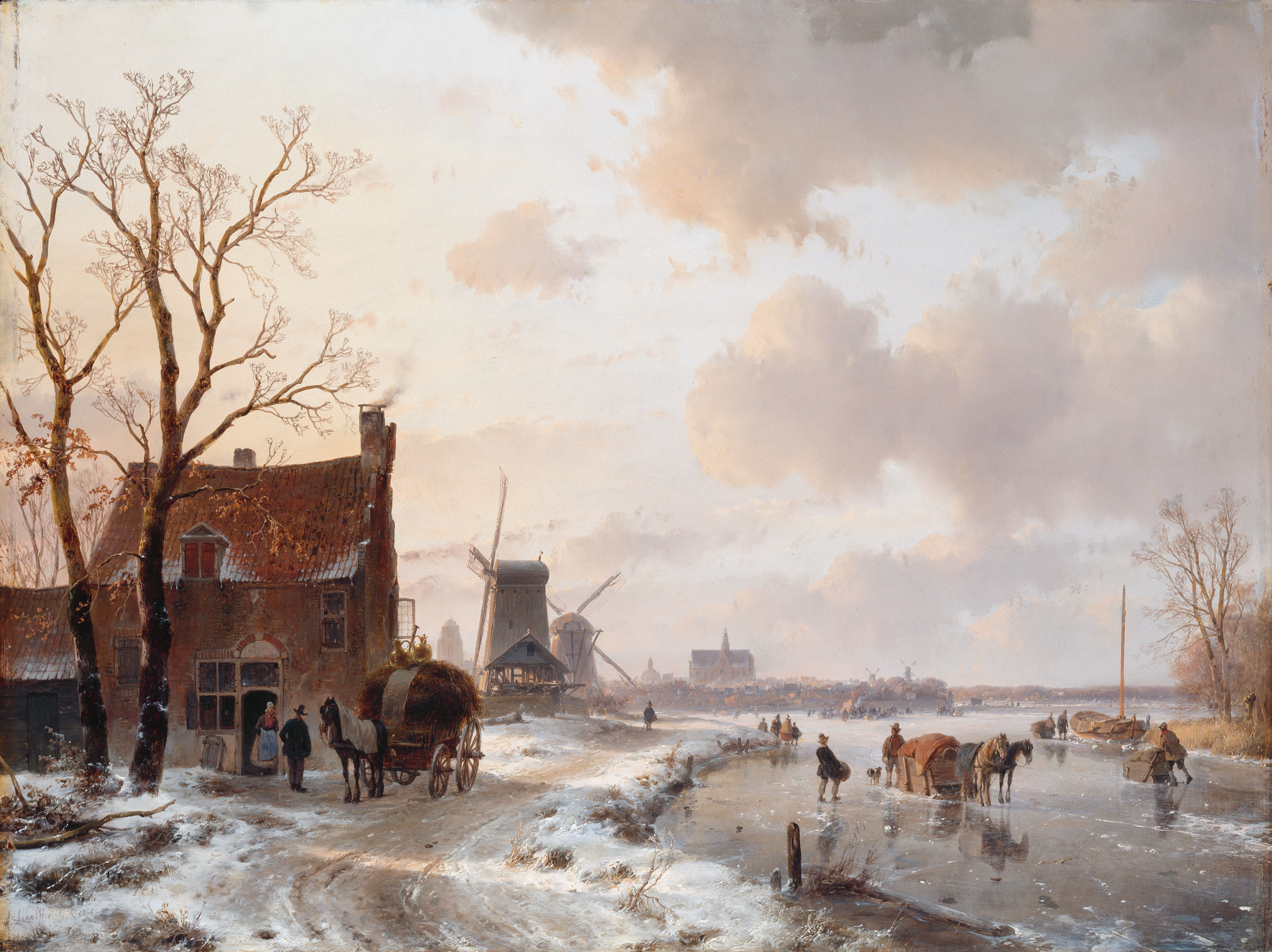
A. Schelfhout, Winter landscape with horses on the ice, 1844; oil on panel

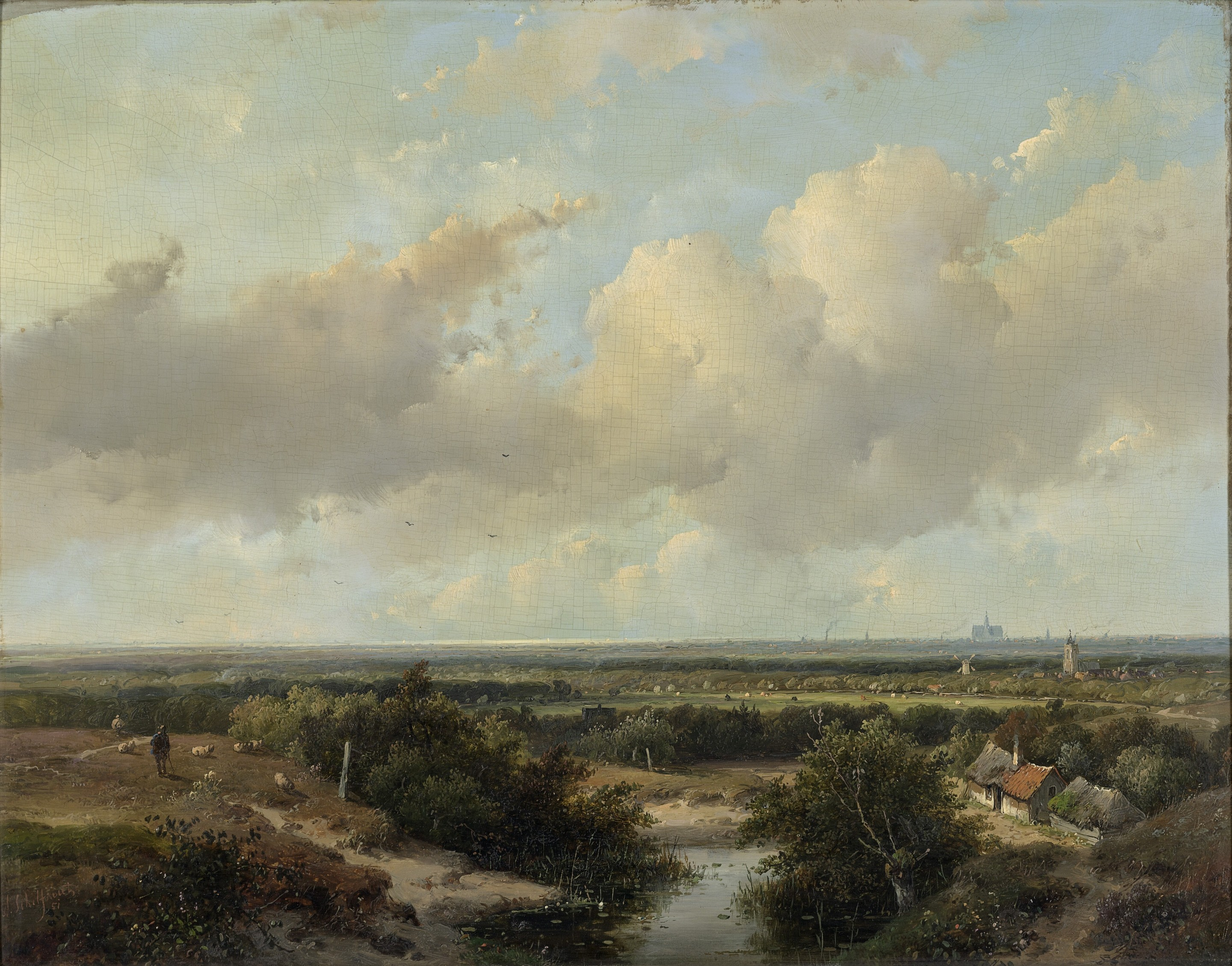
A. Schelfhout, Landscape near Haarlem, 1851; oil-painting

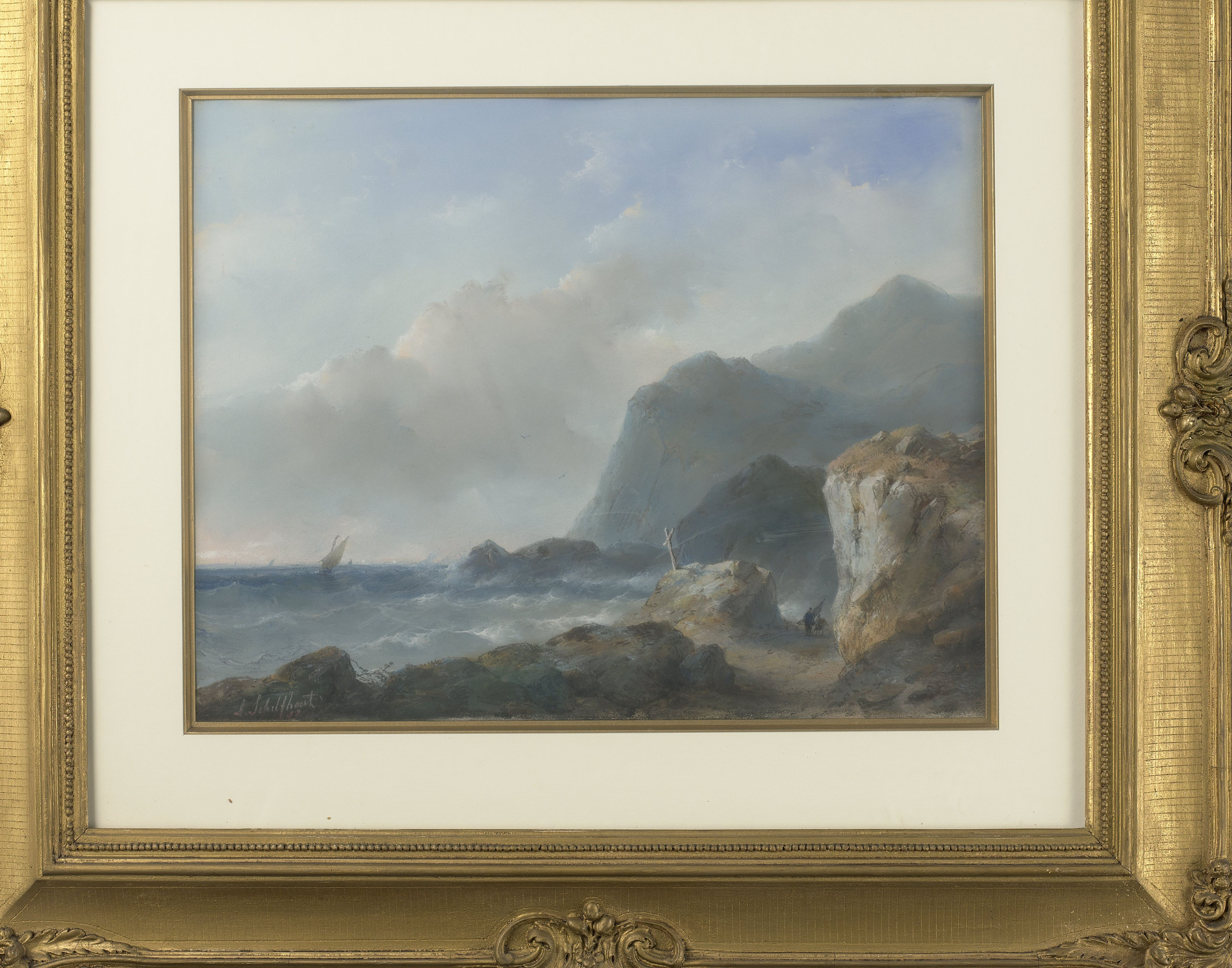
A. Schelfhout, Rocky coast, 1852; pastel on paper

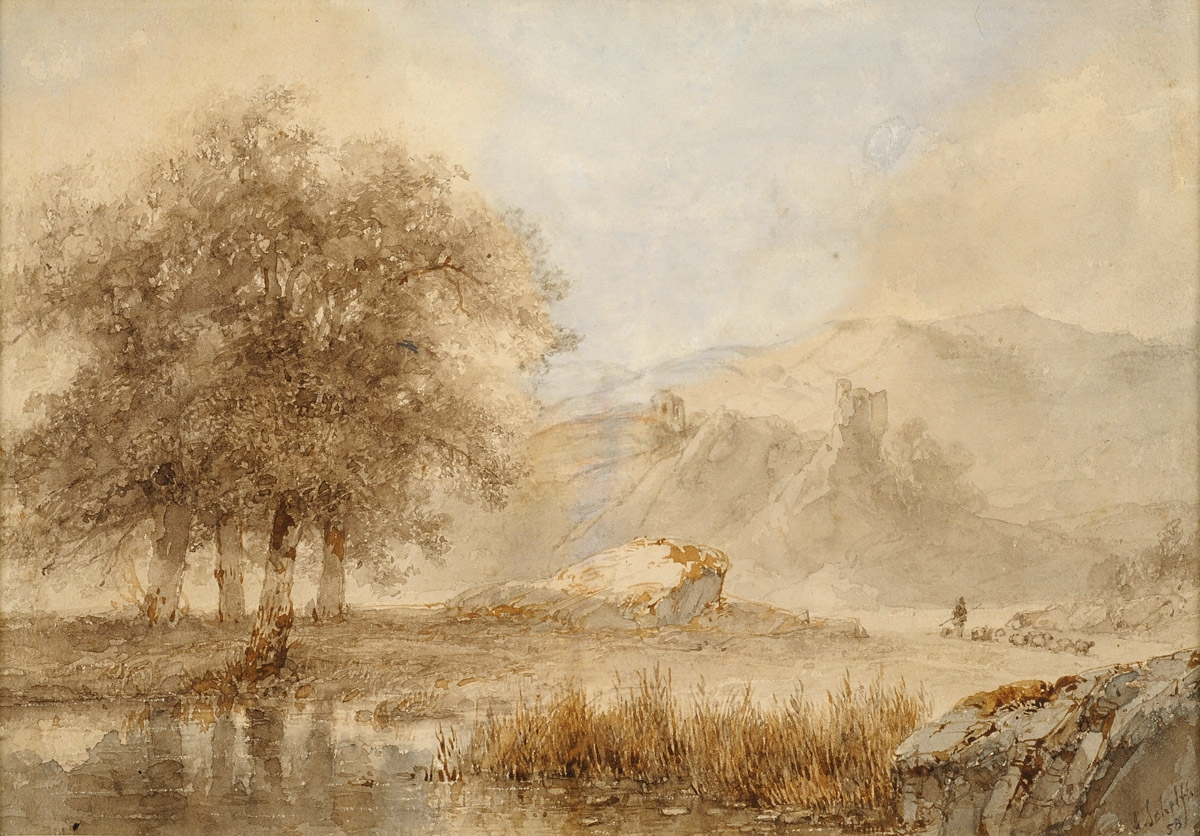
A. Schelfhout, Landscape with Ruin and Mountains, 1858; watercolor on paper

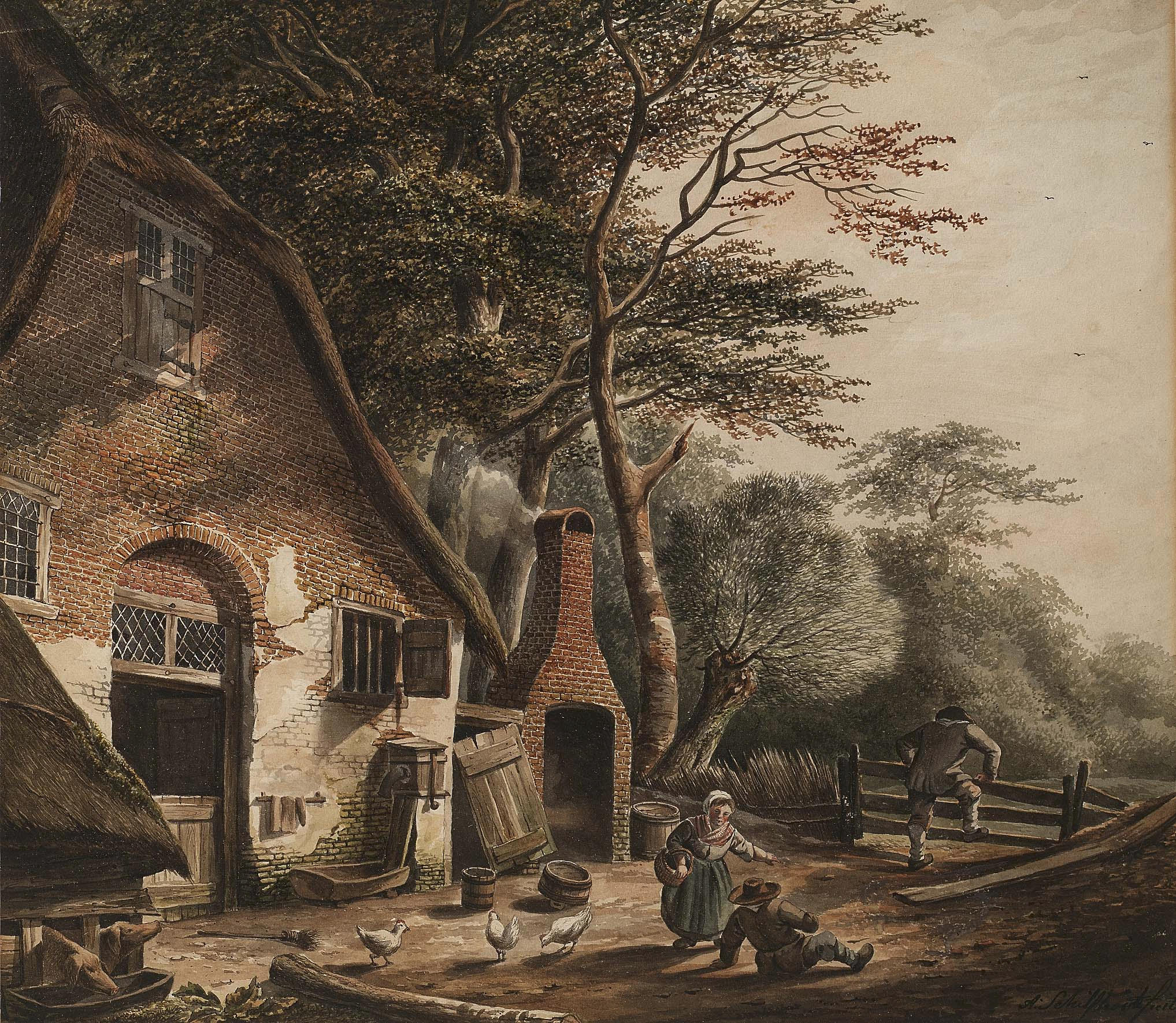
A. Schelfhout, Figures outside a farmstead, undated; pen, Indian ink and watercolor on paper

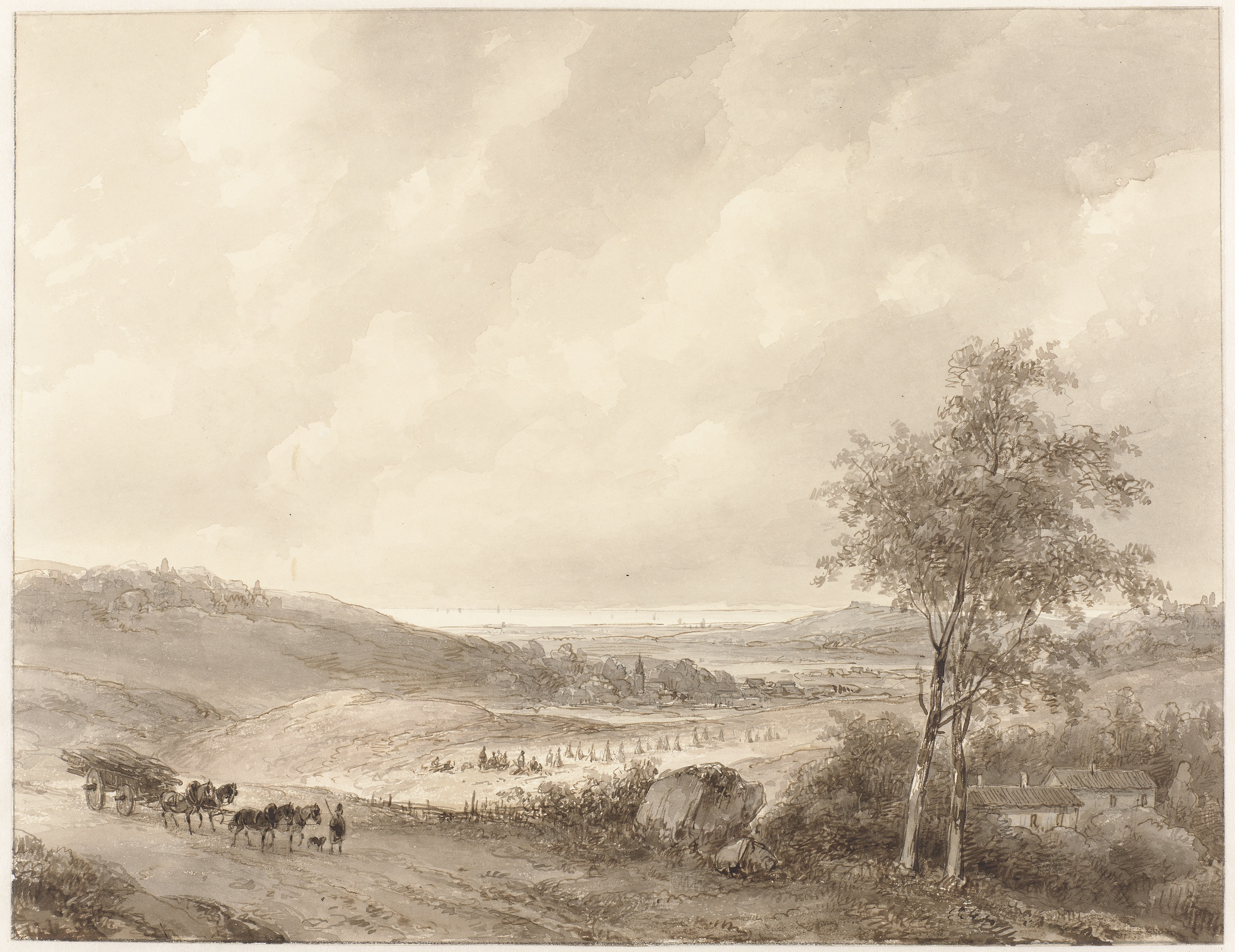
A. Schelfhout, Landscape between Calais and Boulogne, undated; brown pen and pencil on paper

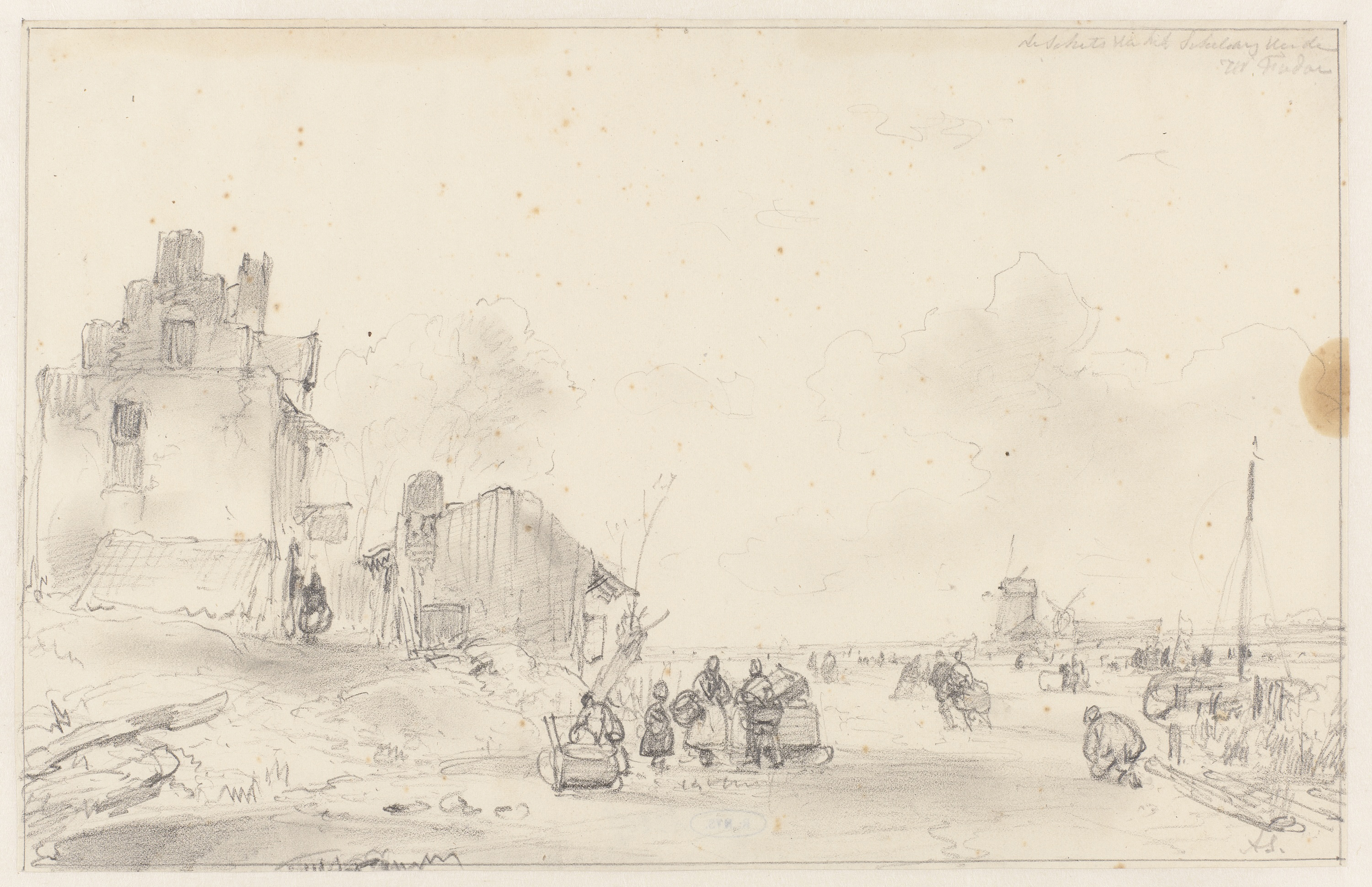
A. Schelfhout, Winter-landscape, undated; pencil on paper

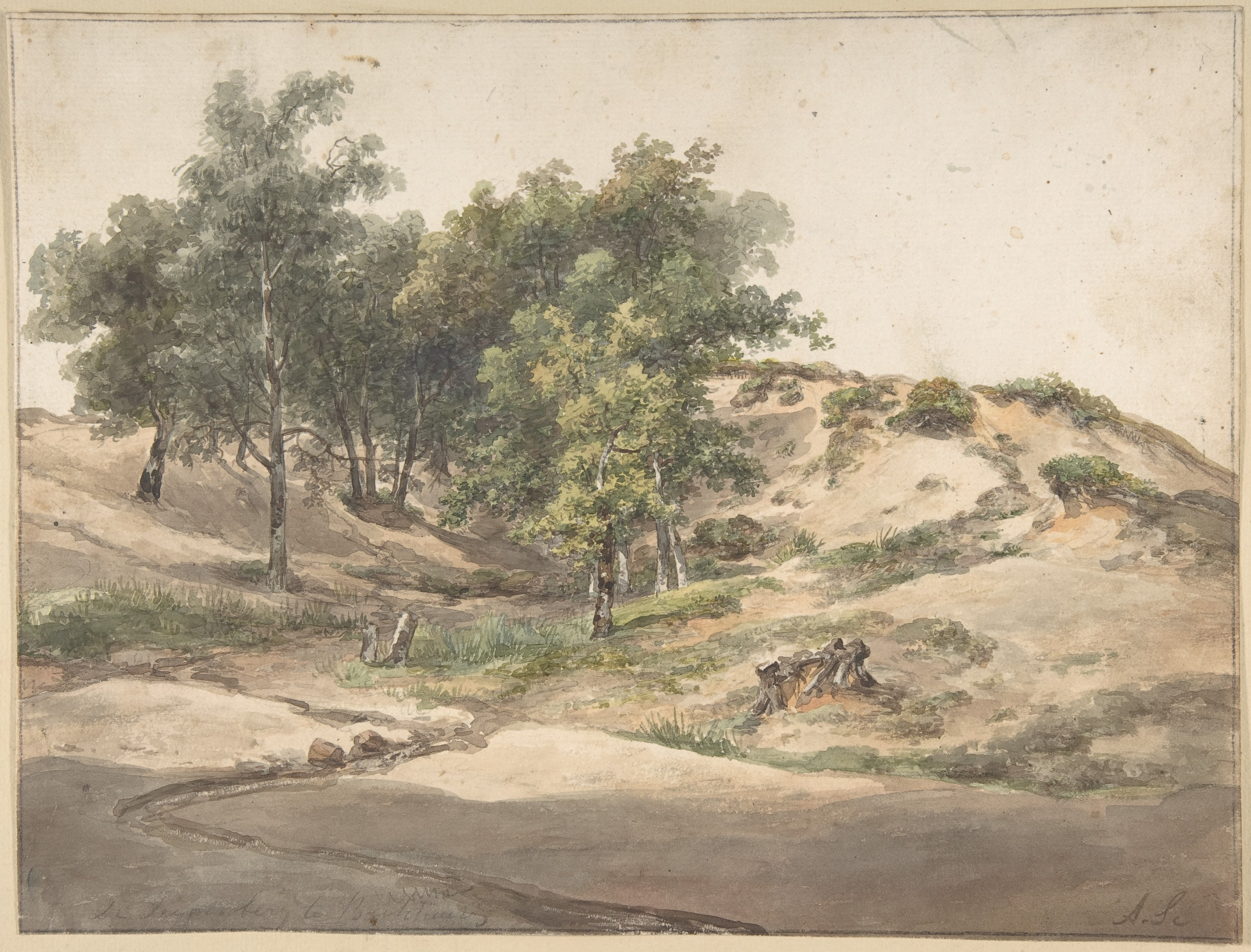
A. Schelfhout, A Wooded Landscape Near Beekhuizen, undated; watercolor over black chalk, on paper

== Bibliography ==
- Leeuw, Ronald de; Sillervis, John and Dumas, Charles (1983): The Hague School: Dutch Masters of the Nineteenth Century, Weidenfeld and Nicolson, London, ISBN 978-0-297-78219-3.
