= Jan Willem van Borselen =

Dutch painter

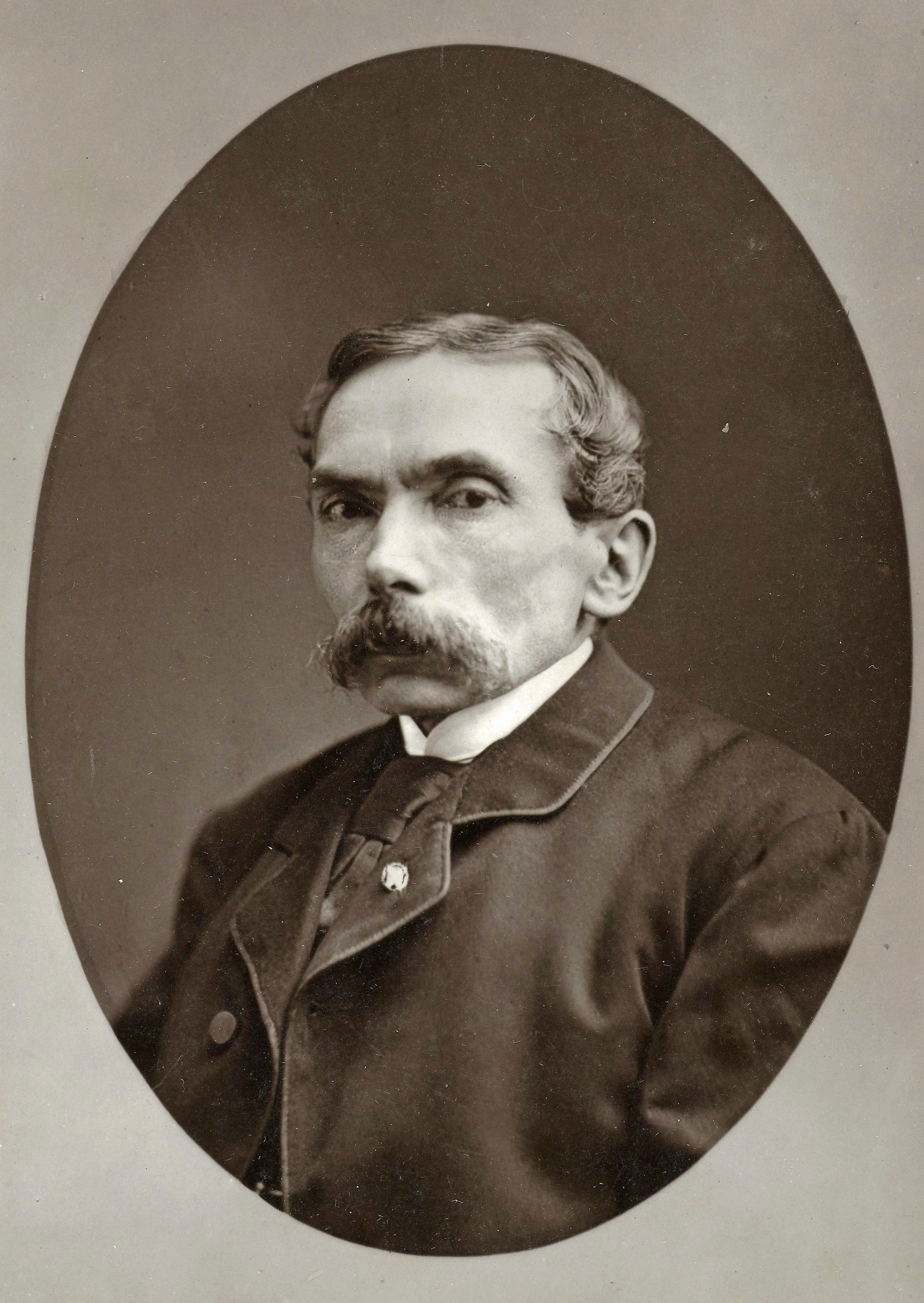
Jan Willem van Borselen (early 1880s)

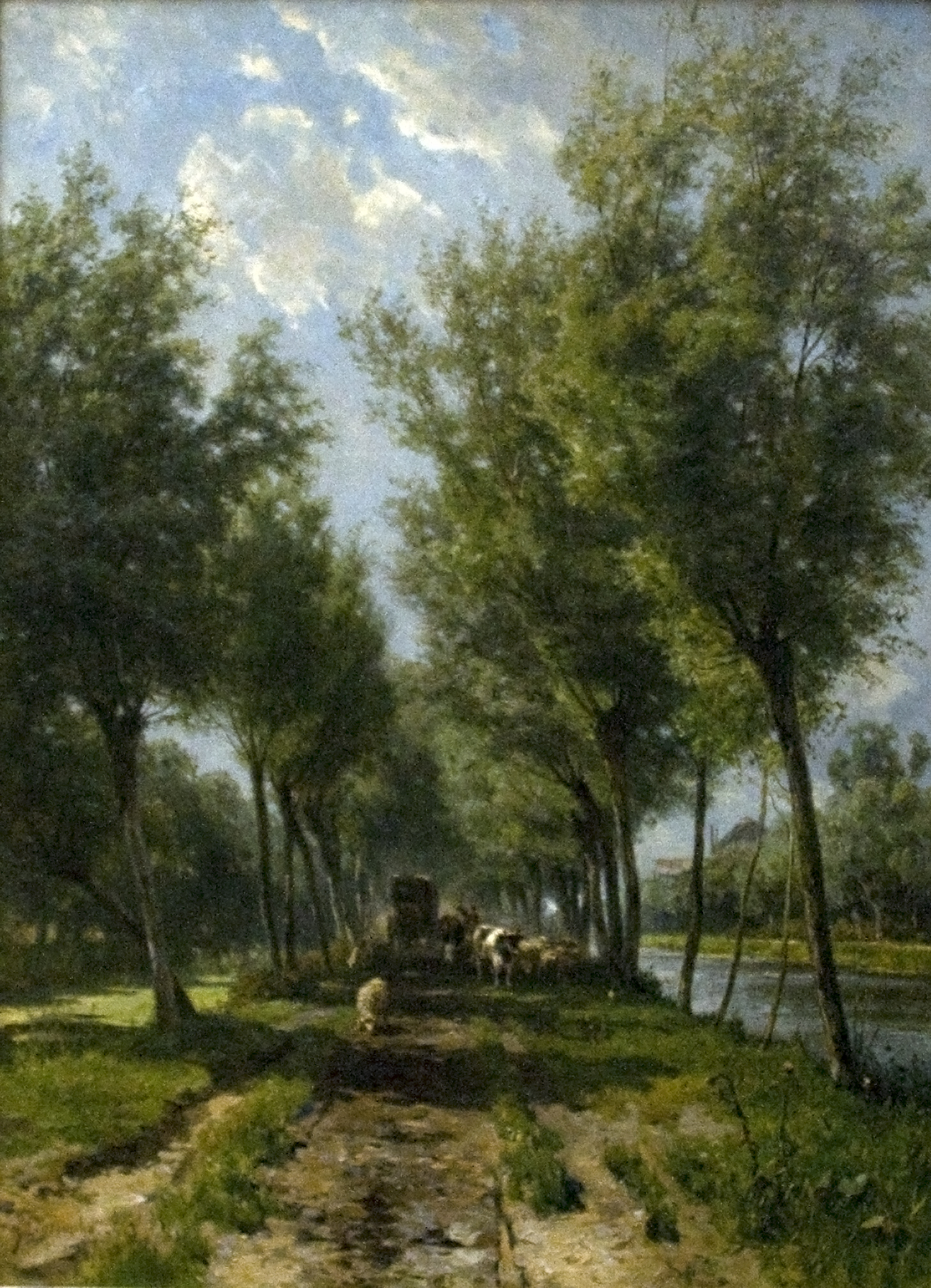
The Road from Polsbroek to Benschop.

Jan Willem van Borselen (20 September 1825, Gouda - 24 September 1892, The Hague) was a Dutch landscape painter, often associated with the Hague School.

== Biography ==
His father, Pieter van Borselen, was the Director of the Walloon Orphanage, but was also known as a landscape painter and lithographer and gave Jan his first lessons. At the age of thirteen, he presented his first landscape at one of his father's exhibitions in Groningen and would continue to exhibit frequently throughout his life.

In 1855, he moved to The Hague, seeking a more affluent clientele, and joined the Pulchri Studio. During his time at the studio, he held several positions, such as Librarian, Secretary and Treasurer. While there, he took up an apprenticeship with Andreas Schelfhout, which would eventually lead to contacts with the Royal Family. He was often invited to stay at Het Loo and paint in the surrounding forests.

From 1857, his primary subjects would be what he referred to as "Wicker, wolken en fladderende riet" (Meadows, clouds and fluttering reeds). Together with his friends, he painted near Gouda and Schoonhoven, making small paintings of 12x18 centimeters (roughly 4x7 inches) that would be converted to larger works at his studio.

In the 1870s, he became an advocate of watercolors and, in 1872, joined the "Société royale belge des aquarellistes"; participating in their exhibitions and winning medals at the Weltausstellung 1873 in Vienna and the Centennial Exhibition in Philadelphia.

Because of his work with the Royal Family, King William III made him a Ridder in the Order of the Oak Crown in 1869 and he was promoted to Officer in 1881. One of his best-known students was Théophile de Bock.
