= Marie Bilders-van Bosse =

Dutch painter (1837-1900)

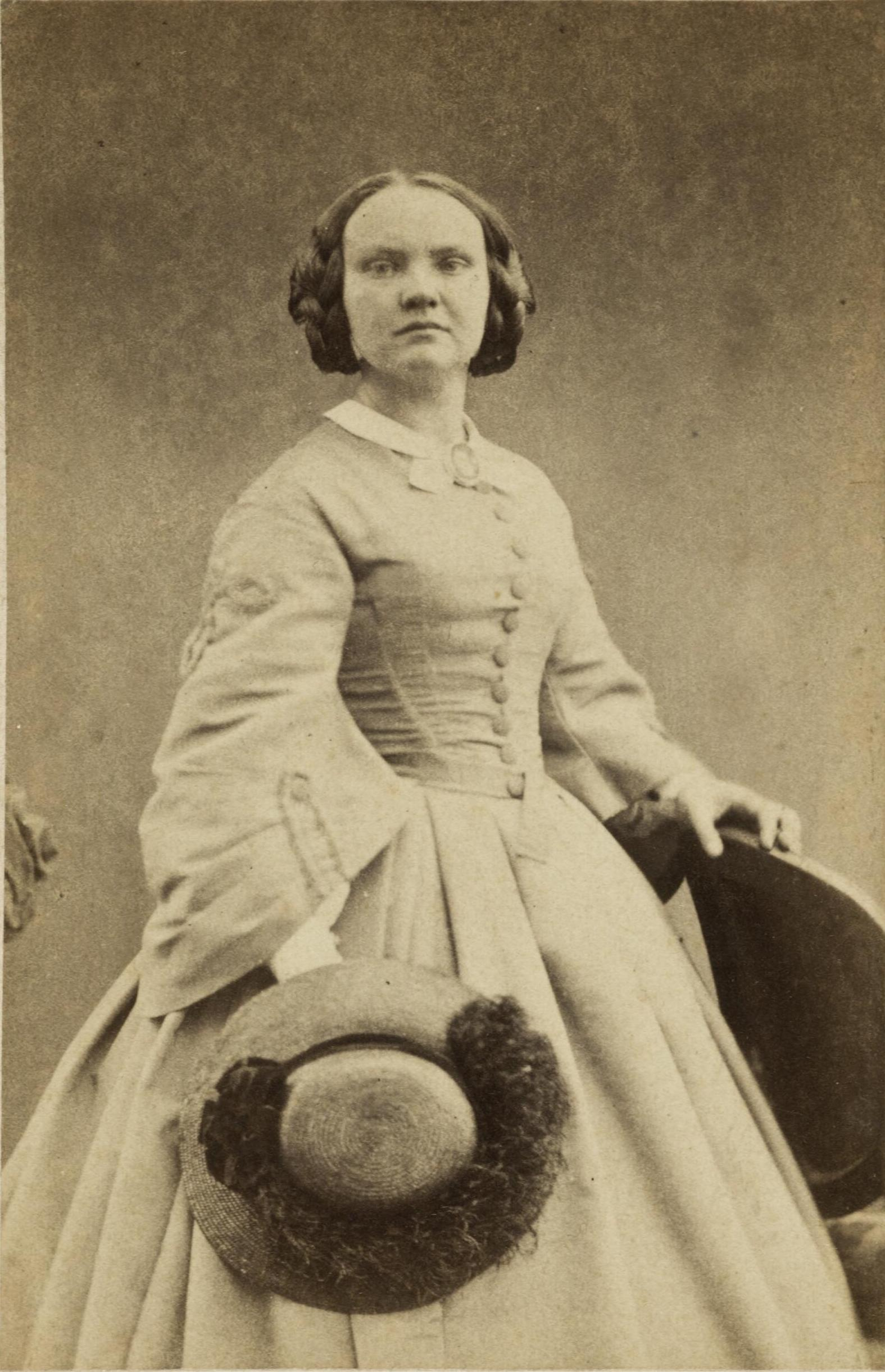
- Maria Philippina van Bosse (1837-1900)
- Born: Maria Philippina van Bosse; 21 February 1837; Amsterdam, Netherlands
- Died: 11 July 1900 (aged 63); Wiesbaden, German Empire
- Known for: Landscape painting
- Spouse: Johannes Warnardus Bilders (m. 1880; died 1890)
- Father: Pieter Philip van Bosse

Maria Philippina (Marie) Bilders-van Bosse (Amsterdam, 21 February 1837 – Wiesbaden, 11 July 1900) was a painter, famous for her landscape paintings in an early Dutch-impressionist style.

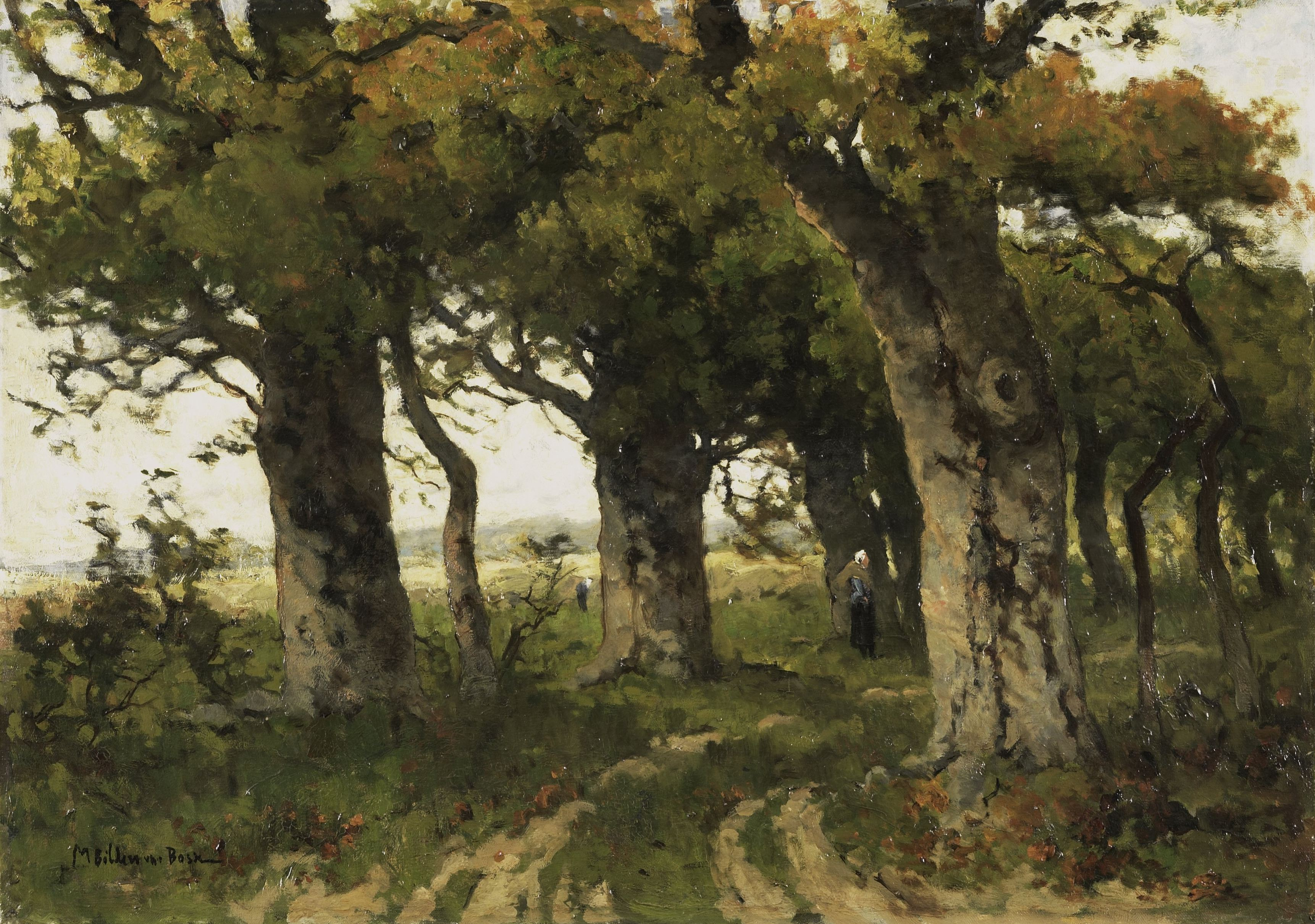
oil-painting: 'Avenue of Oaks in Late Summer', c. 1880-1900

== Biography ==
Marie van Bosse was a daughter of Pieter Philip van Bosse (1809–1879) and Maria Johanna Reynvaan (1809–1864). Her father was a lawyer and Minister of Finance in The Netherlands for more than twenty years. Because of his work at the ministry, the family moved to The Hague. Marie van Bosse was a niece of the artist Sara Stracké-van Bosse.

At age eighteen Marie van Bosse decided that she wanted to become a painter – a rather unusual decision for a woman of that time.

She was taught in painting by the Dutch artist Hendrik van de Sande Bakhuyzen and frequently advised by Johannes Bosboom. It was Bosboom who encouraged her to exhibit her works. From 1875 she received lessons from Johannes Warnardus Bilders (1811–1890). They married in 1880, with Bosboom and Hendrik Willem Mesdag as witnesses. She was the same age as J. W. Bilders's son, the landscape-painter Gerard Bilders, who had died in 1865. The couple settled in the rural village Oosterbeek where she painted many landscapes. After the death of her husband, she returned to The Hague.

== Work ==
Marie van Bosse focused mainly on landscape painting. She usually signed 'M. Bilders van Bosse'. Besides her oil paintings, she made many watercolors and drawings on paper. She frequently pictured the forests in the district Gelderland and the floodplains, but painted also in Drenthe, the adjacent Westerwolde (region) and in the surroundings of The Hague. In her artistic development she approached with her paintings and watercolors the Dutch Impressionism of the Hague School, but with her own characteristic focus on trees and forests.

Marie van Bosse became a member of the Hollandsche Teekenmaatschappij in 1878 and joined the Pulchri Studio in The Hague a year later. She has exhibited at several 'Exhibitions of Living Masters' (from 1873), the Paris Salon of 1880 and the 'National Exhibition of Women's Work' of 1898 (Nationale Tentoonstelling van Vrouwenarbeid 1898). She received a bronze medal at the World Exhibition of 1889 and an honorable mention at the World's Fair of 1900, both in Paris. She exhibited her work at the Palace of Fine Arts at the 1893 World's Columbian Exposition in Chicago, Illinois.

Mrs. Van Bosse kept the prices of her paintings low, in order to be able to sell easier; this however led to protests from other Hague painter-colleagues. She maintained friendly contacts in the cultural elite (Bosboom-Toussaint, Gijsbert van Tienhoven, Augusta de Wit, Anna Wolterbeek) of The Netherlands in those days.

Van Bosse's work has been included among others in the collections of the Rijksmuseum Amsterdam, Museum Boijmans Van Beuningen, Teylers Museum, Frans Hals Museum, Groninger Museum and the Stedelijk Museum Amsterdam. Because of a back disorder, Van Bosse regularly settled in Germany. She died in 1900 at a spa in Wiesbaden at the age of 63. She was buried with her husband in Oosterbeek, The Netherlands.

== Gallery ==
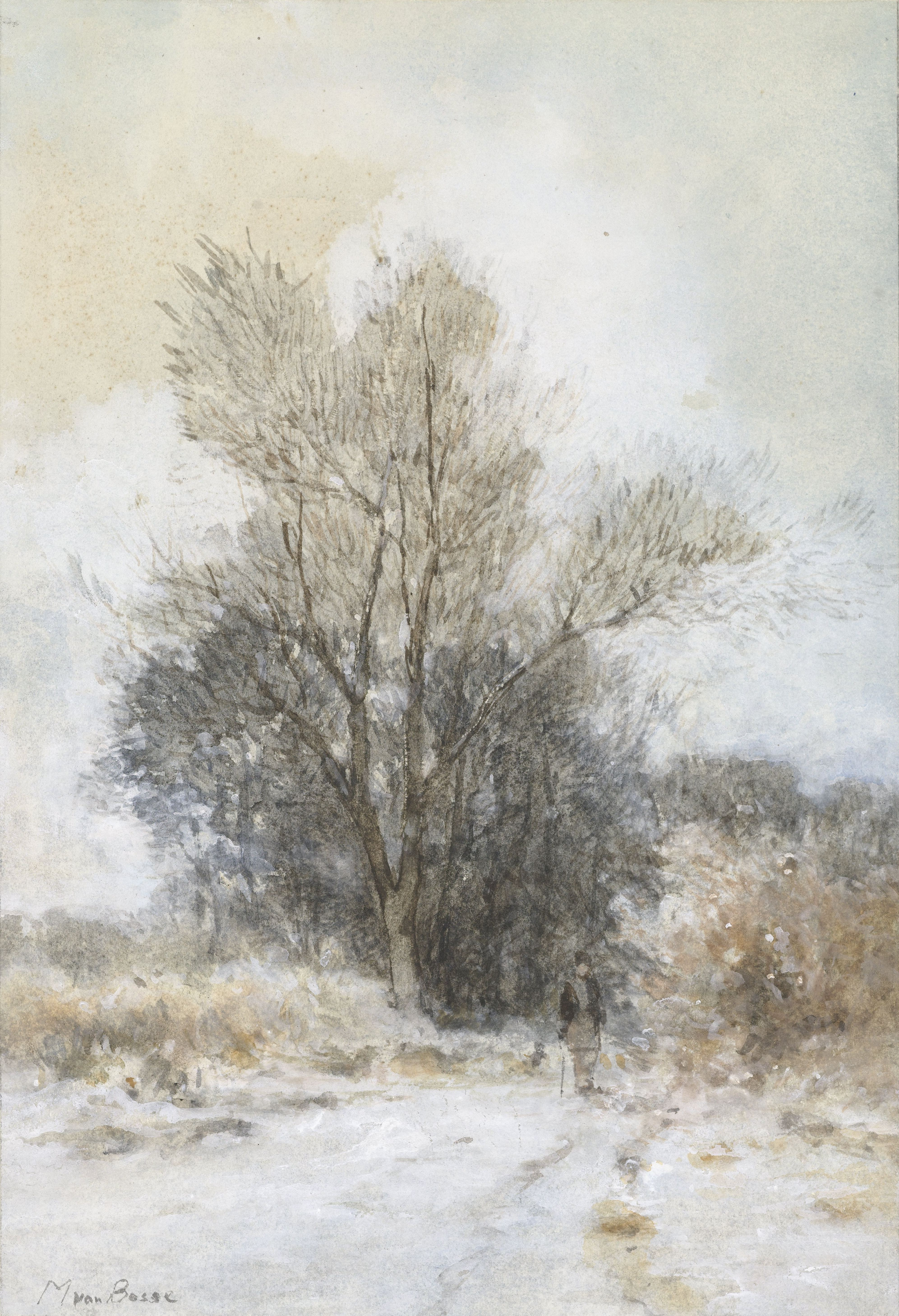
Maria van Bosse: 'Walking in the Snow', c. 1880; watercolor

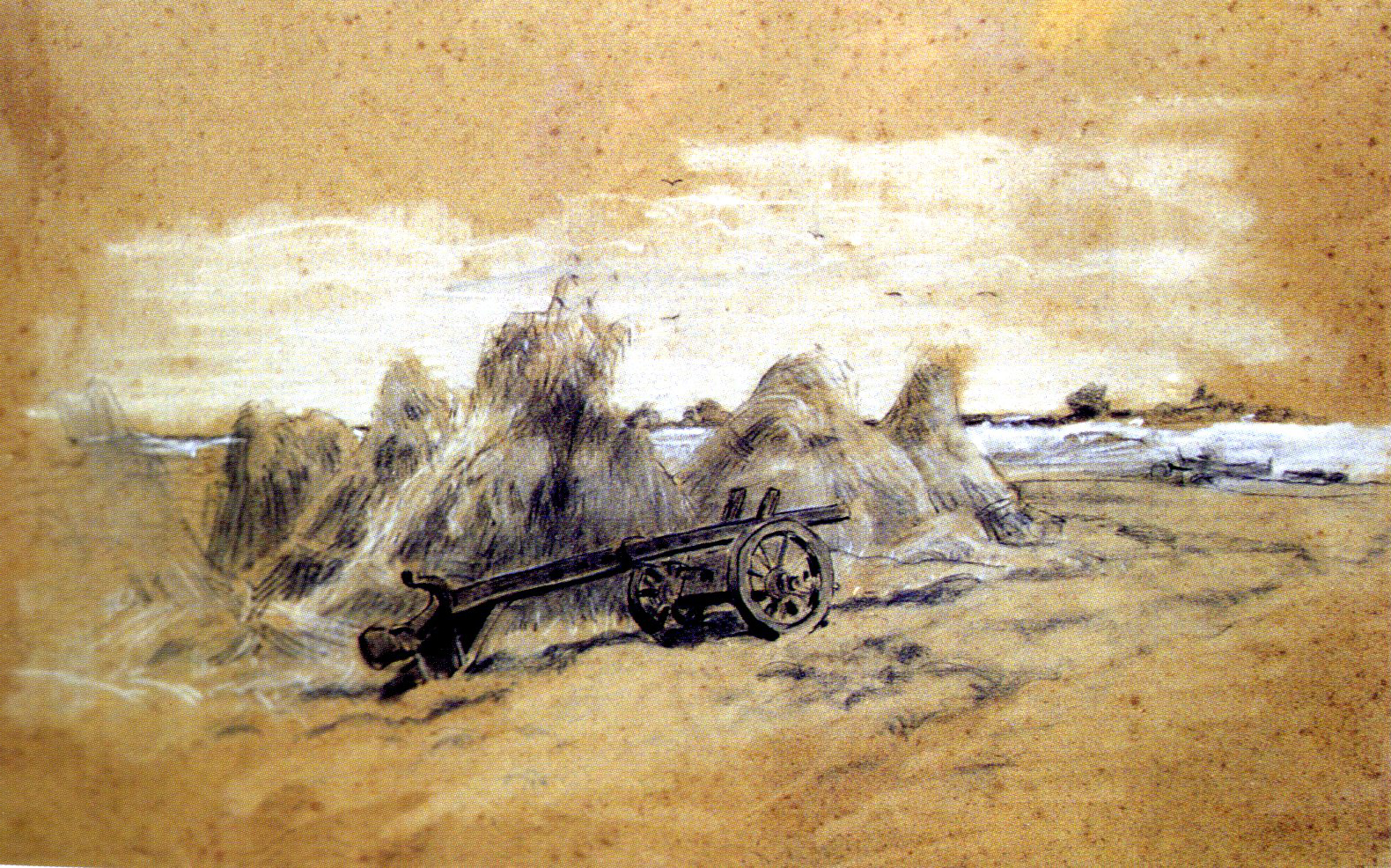
Maria van Bosse: 'Grain sheaves', c. 1880; work on paper

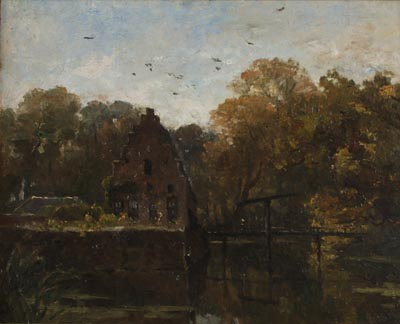
'Landscape near the castle Doorwerth', 1880s; oil-painting on canvas

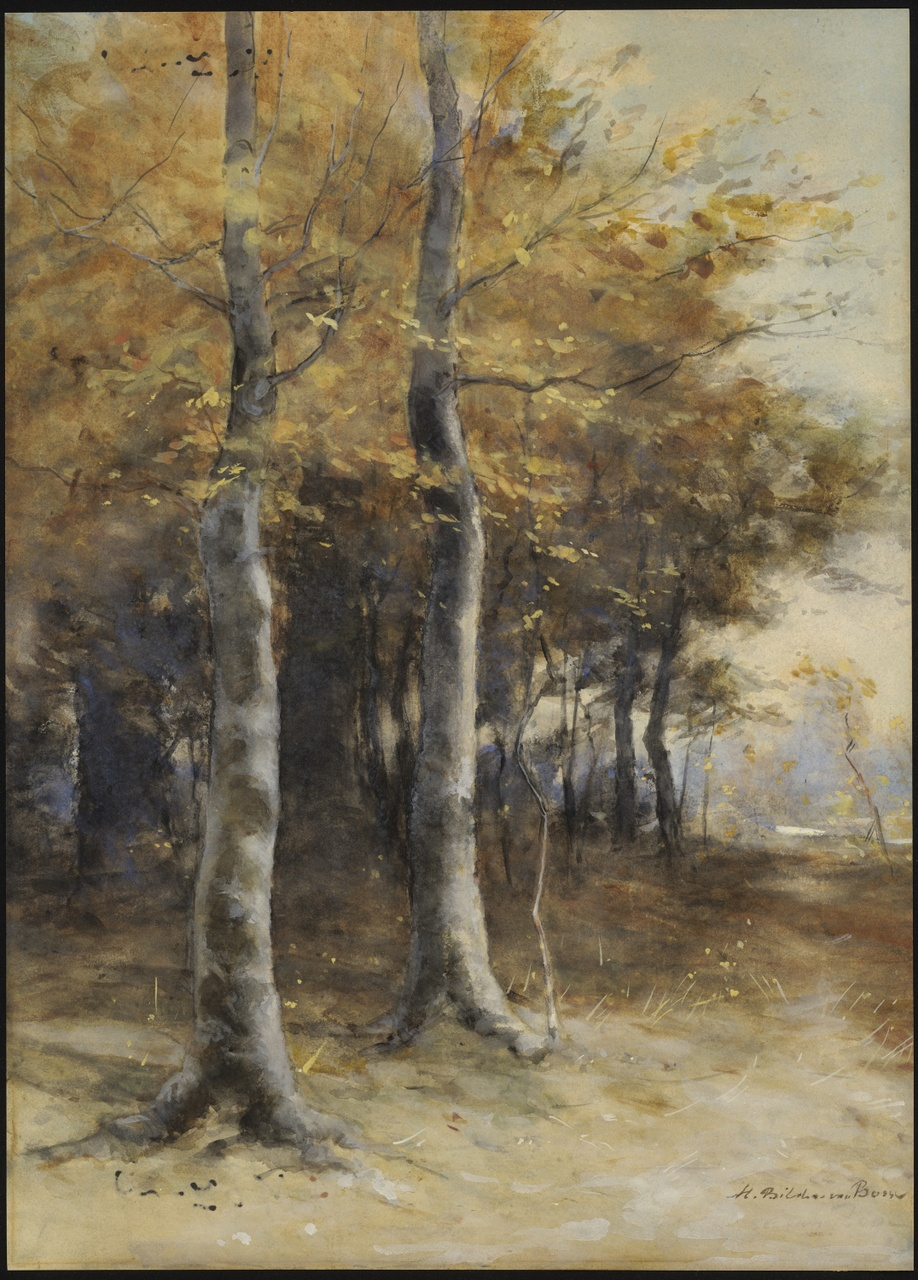
'Beech Wood', c. 1875-1890; oil on panel

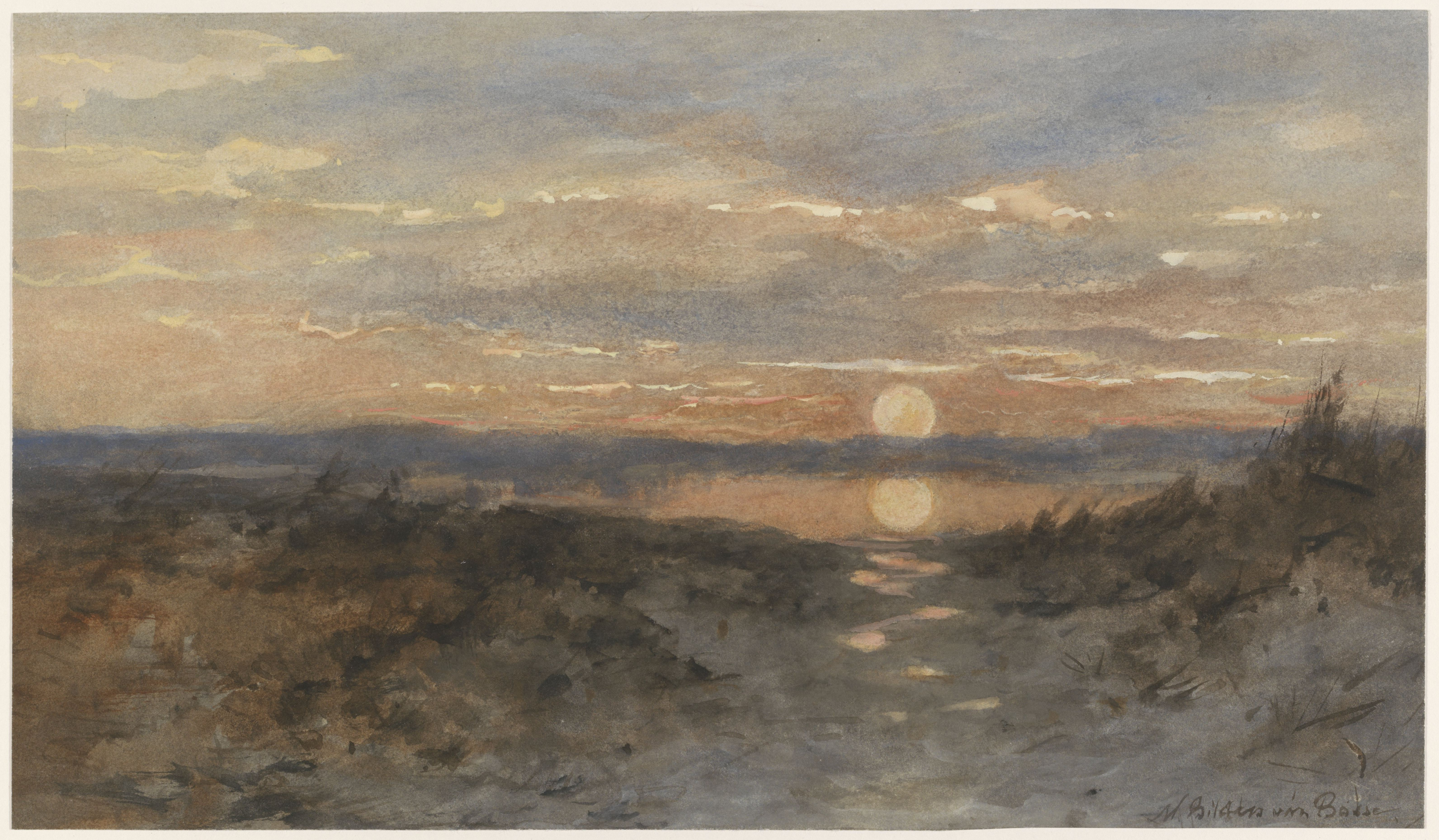
'Landscape with sunset', c. 1880-1900; watercolor on paper

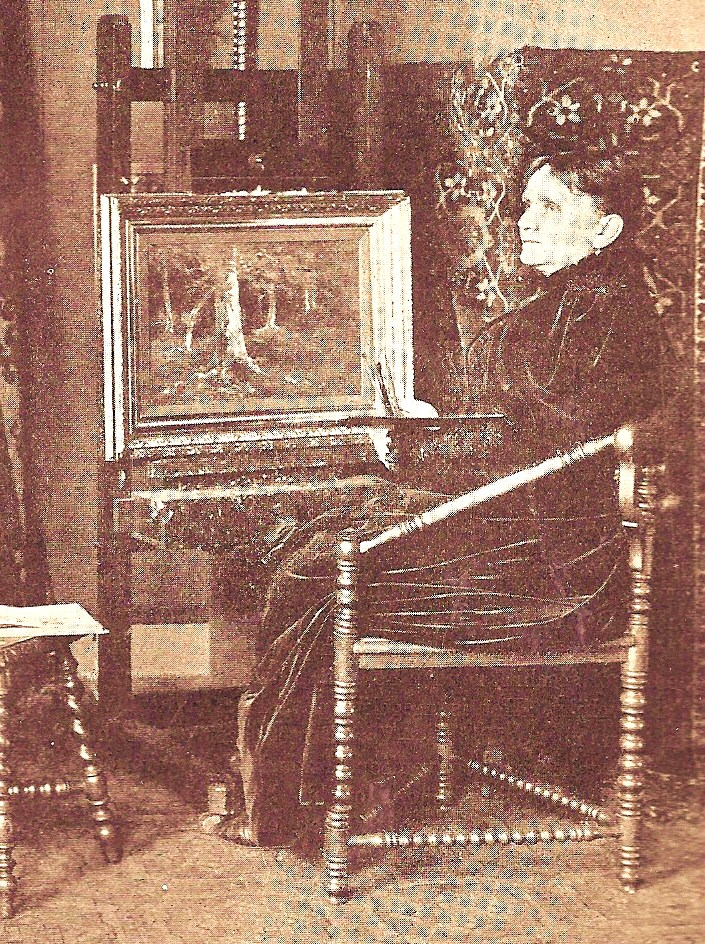
Maria van Bosse in her studio c. 1900, with a finished 'Forest-view' on the easel

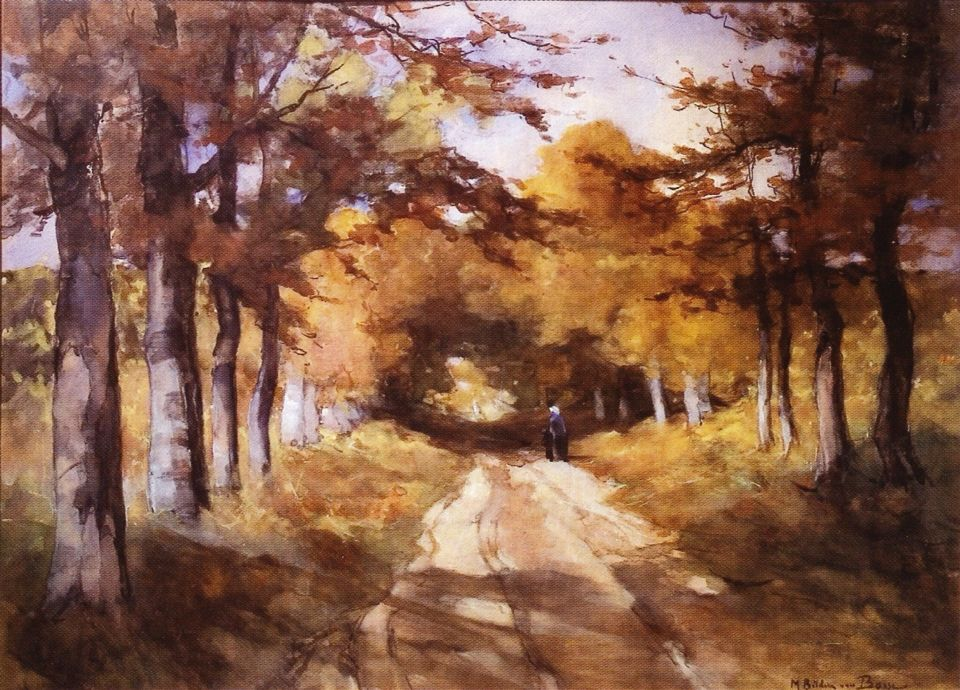
'Alley with trees and a small figure', watercolor on paper; c, 1880–95

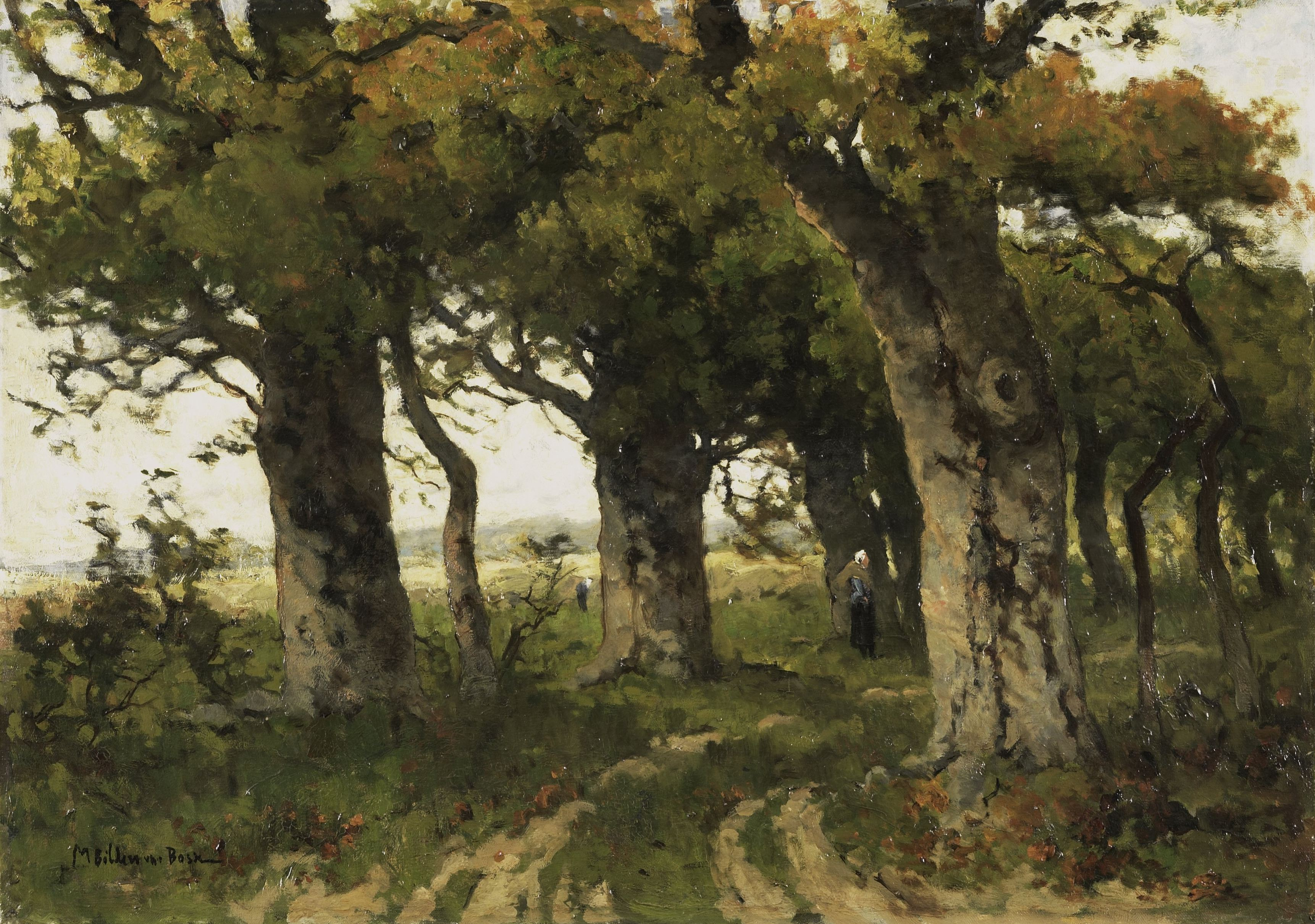
'Oak alley' in Fall, c. 1880-1895; oil on canvas

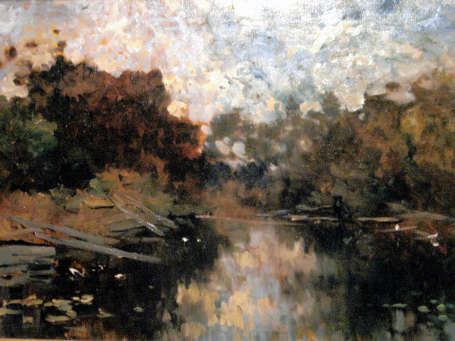
'Het Balkengat', c. 1890s; oil-painting on canvas
