= Matthijs Maris =

Dutch painter

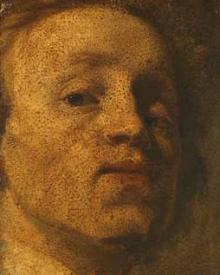
Self-portrait of Matthijs Maris, c. 1875

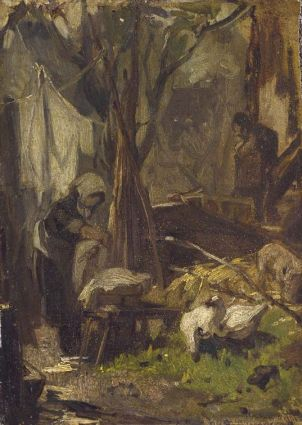
Matthijs Maris, Wash Day

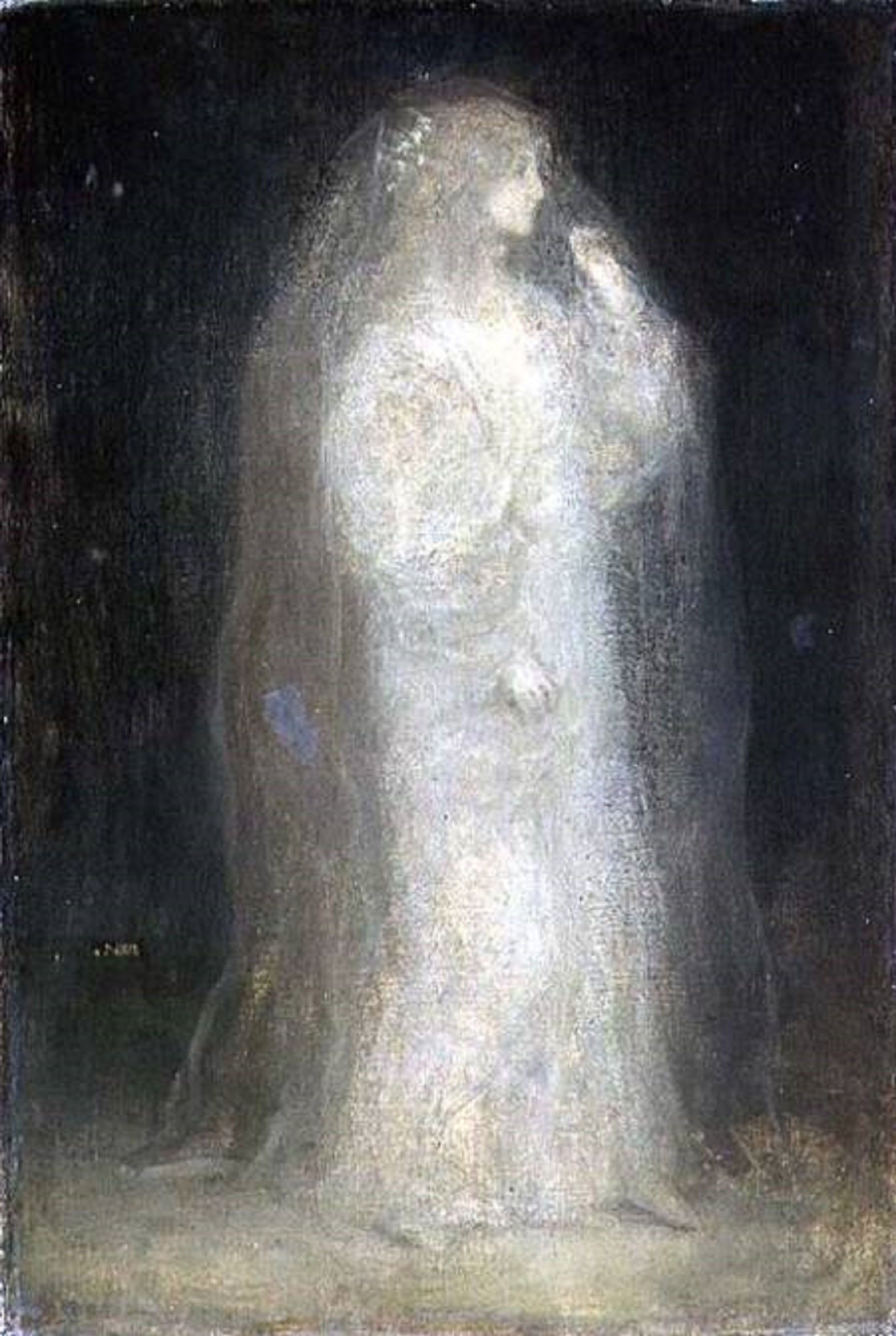
Matthijs Maris, The Bride, or Novice taking the Veil, 1887

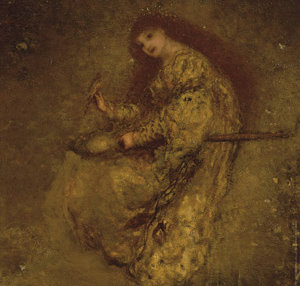
Matthijs Maris, The Goatherd

Matthias Maris (17 August 1839 – 22 August 1917) was a Dutch painter, etcher and lithographer. He was also known as Matthijs Maris or Thijs. He initially belonged to the Hague School, like his two brothers, Jacob and Willem, but his later works deviated more and more from that school into a unique style influenced by the Pre-Raphaelites.

He was born in The Hague. At the age of twelve, he registered at the Hague Academy of Art, but did not pass the entrance exam. Therefore, he took lessons from Isaac Cornelis Elink Sterk, secretary of the academy. One year later he was admitted and studied there until 1855. In 1854 he became a pupil of the marine painter Louis Meijer, who helped him obtain a grant from Queen Sophie that enabled him to follow his brother Jacob to Antwerp, where they rented rooms together. In 1858 Matthijs returned to The Hague, where Jacob already had a studio they could share. A later commission enabled them to travel in and start painting in Oosterbeek with painters as Gerard Bilders and Anton Mauve.

In 1860 he traveled with his brother Jacob along the Rhine to Switzerland and back through France to the Netherlands. In Cologne the brothers saw an exhibition that presented an overview of German art since 1800, which intensified the influence of German Romanticism on Matthijs.

Upon his return to the Netherlands Matthijs showed some of his works in Amsterdam and The Hague, but they were not well received. This led him to become bitter and withdrawn. Jacob was having success in Paris, and invited Matthijs to join him there, which he did in 1869. After the Franco-Prussian War of 1870–71 Jacob returned to The Hague with his family and the loneliness after the departure of Jacob was difficult for Matthijs. There was bitter poverty for him, as for so many artists at that time in Paris, so he went back to work. His style changed very little and was more reminiscent of the earlier period. Later he would distance himself from these works, dismissing them as 'potboilers', only painted in order to put food on the table.

An art dealer Daniel Cottier convinced him to settle in London, which he did in 1877. There he painted more imaginative scenes: fairytale characters and enchanted castles. He also painted a number of brides in fine gray tones, delicate and hazy like a dream. He made portraits, especially of the children of friends such as Baby lessor (private collection, 1880) and Barije Swan (Gemeentemuseum, 1887), the fragile child in her white and gray painted lace dress with fine color accents of yellow lemon and the blue ribbons. Children, whether or not combined with animals, were always a favorite subject. He painted portraits and figure in gray-brown tones in many layers, using dry loose paint. The image is as it were veiled in mist.

Maris died in London on 22 August 1917, when he was seventy-eight, following a short illness, and was buried there.

== Sources ==
- Braakhuis, H.E.M., and J. van der Vliet, Patterns in the life and work of Matthijs Maris. Simiolus 10 (1978-1979): 142–181.
- Sillevis, John and Tabak, Anne, The Hague School Book, Waanders Uitgegevers, Zwolle, 2004 (pp 301–309)
- Mw. M. van Delft, "Marris, Matthias (1839-1917)", Biografisch Woordenboek van Nederland (1985), online version of 12 November 2013 (in Dutch).
