= Johannes Warnardus Bilders =

Dutch painter (1811–1890)

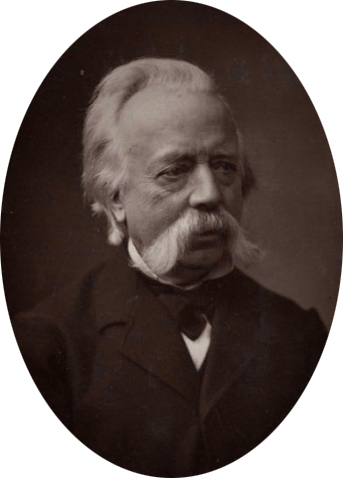
- Born: 18 August 1811; Utrecht, Zuyderzée, French Empire
- Died: 29 October 1890; Oosterbeek, Netherlands
- Known for: Landscape painting
- Movement: forerunner of The Hague School
- Spouse: Marie Bilders-van Bosse (m. 1880)

Johannes Warnardus Bilders (18 August 1811 – 29 October 1890) was a Dutch landscape-painter; he was the father of Gerard Bilders (1838–1865) and a forerunner of the Hague School because of his connections with H.W. Mesdag, Jozef Israëls, Willem Roelofs, his later wife Marie Bilders-van Bosse and others painters of The Hague.

== Biography ==
Johannes Bilders was born in Utrecht and took lessons from Jan Lodewijk Jonxis (1789–1867). In 1830, at the time of the start of the Belgian Revolution, struggling for independence from The Netherlands, he registered as a Dutch volunteer soldier to help suppress the uprising against the Dutch government and King. He stayed in the army for a number of years, after which he returned to Utrecht and returned to his art-teacher Jonxis for painting lessons again. After travels in Germany, he settled down in 1841 at Oosterbeek, also called the 'Dutch Barbizon', where he gathered around him many young painters who would later become central figures in the Hague School. Some of these painters were Anton Mauve, Paul Gabriël and his son Gerard Bilders, among others.

In 1846 he returned to Utrecht, where he was employed until 1852. Then he spent one year in Amsterdam where he was acquainted with Jozef Israëls. He went back to Oosterbeek (1855–1858). After some time he went to Amsterdam for a long period (1858–1880), then back to Oosterbeek where he married his second wife, the woman-painter Marie Bilders-van Bosse. They spent there together 10 years; he died on 29 October 1890.

== Gallery ==
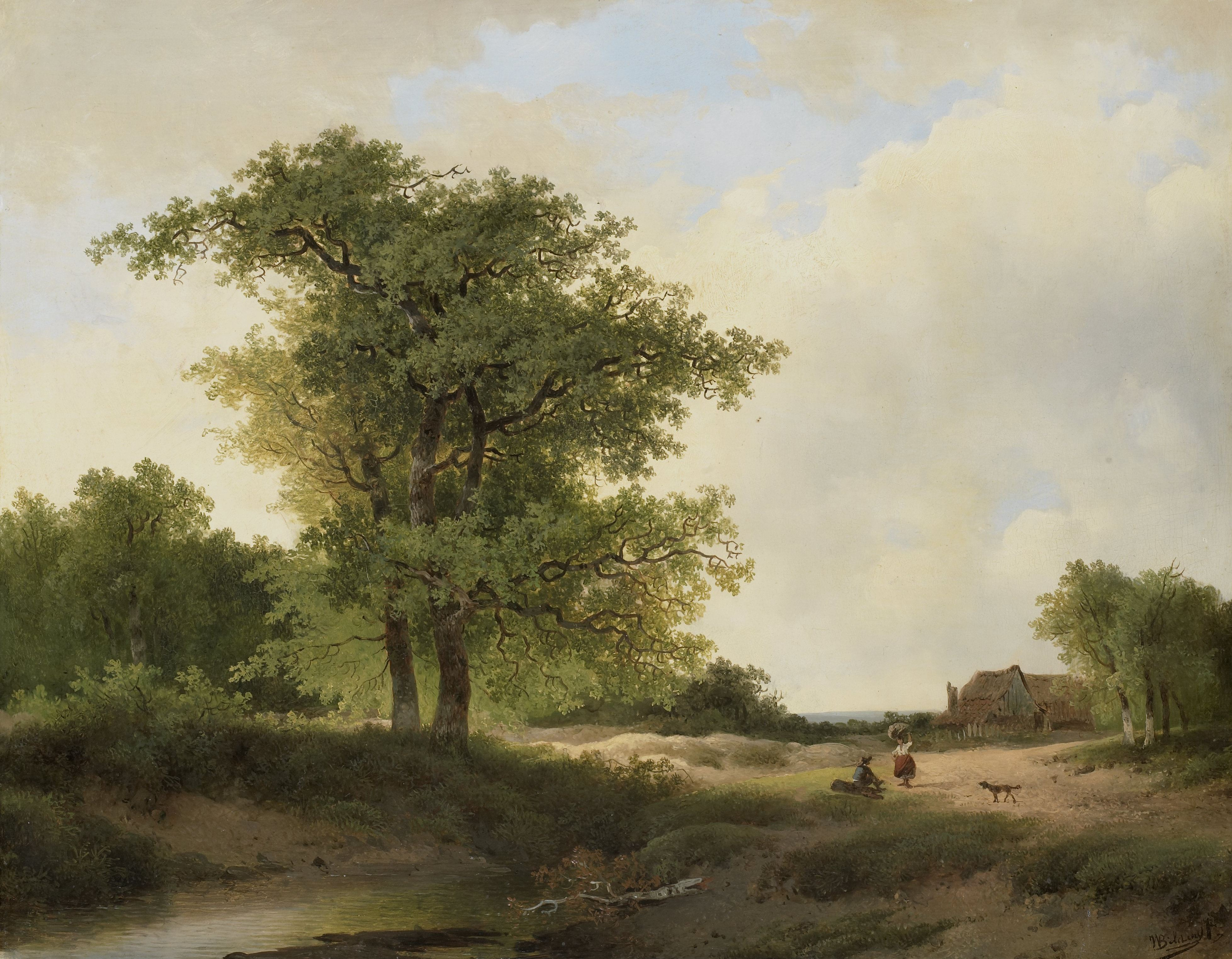
J.W. Bilders: Landscape with farm, c. 1840–50; oil on panel

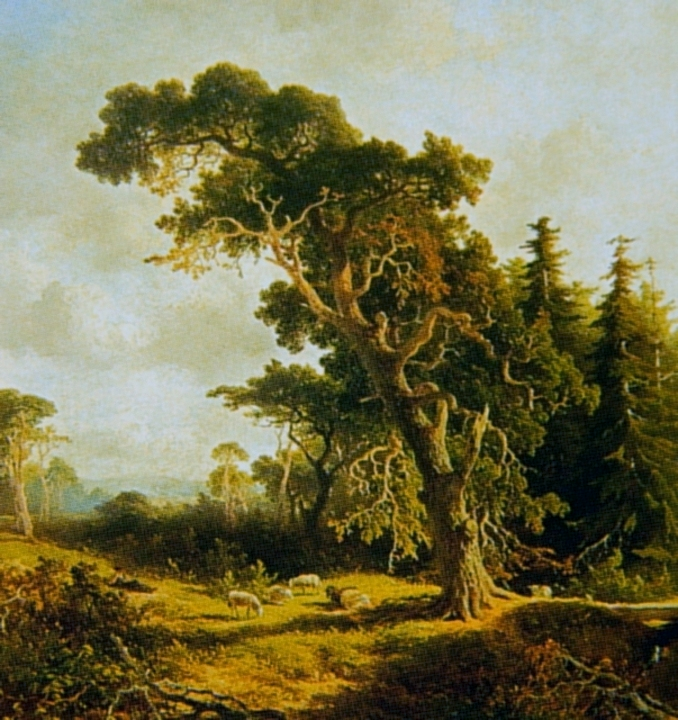
J.W. Bilders: Millennial Pine / Duizendjarige Den, c. 1850; oil-painting

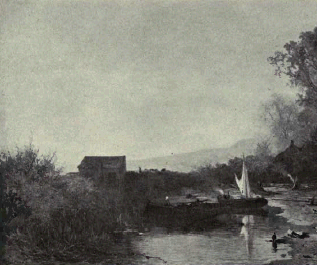
J.W. Bilders: The Little Lake

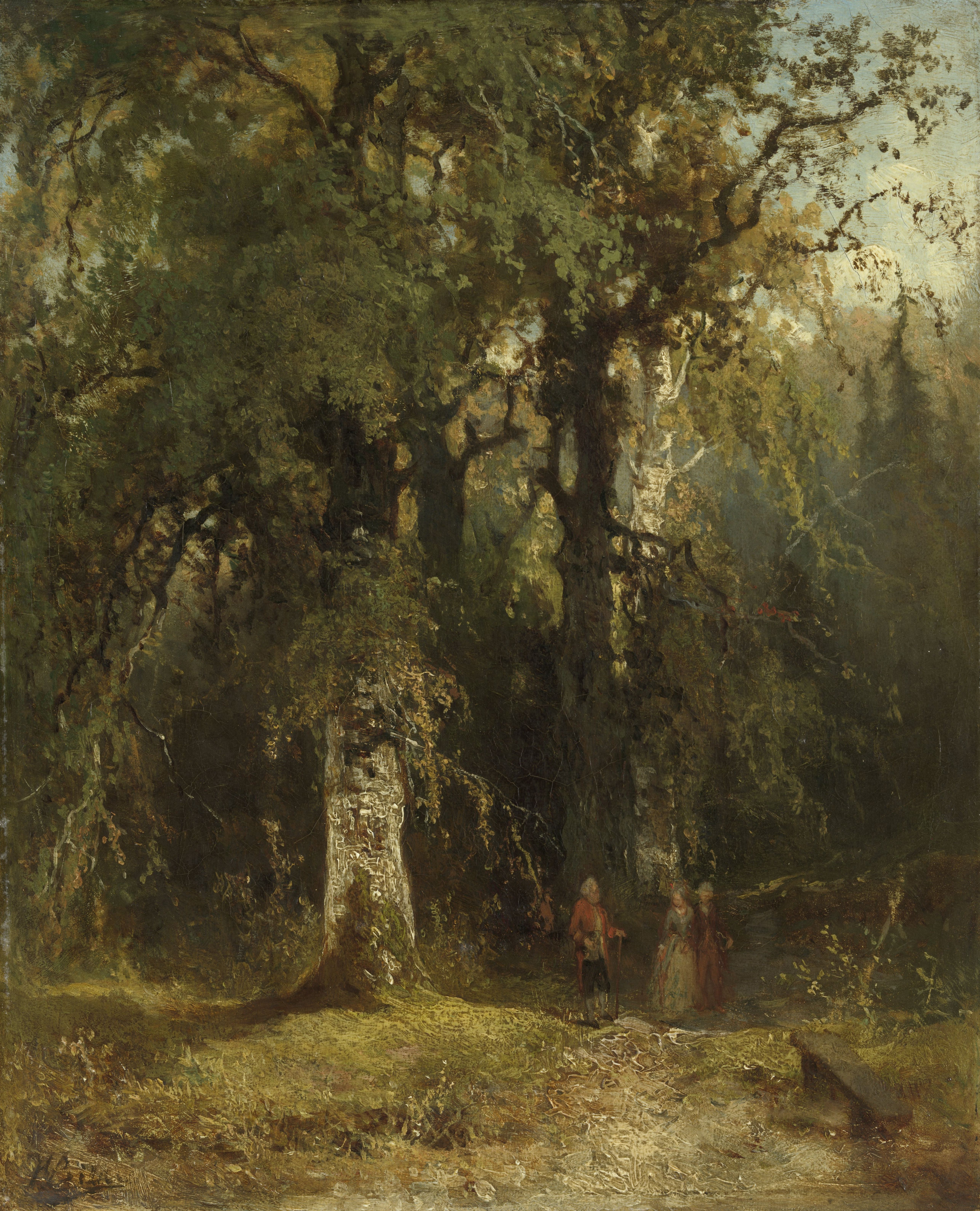
J.W. Bilders: View in the Woods, c. 1860–80; oil on canvas - collection Rijksmuseum

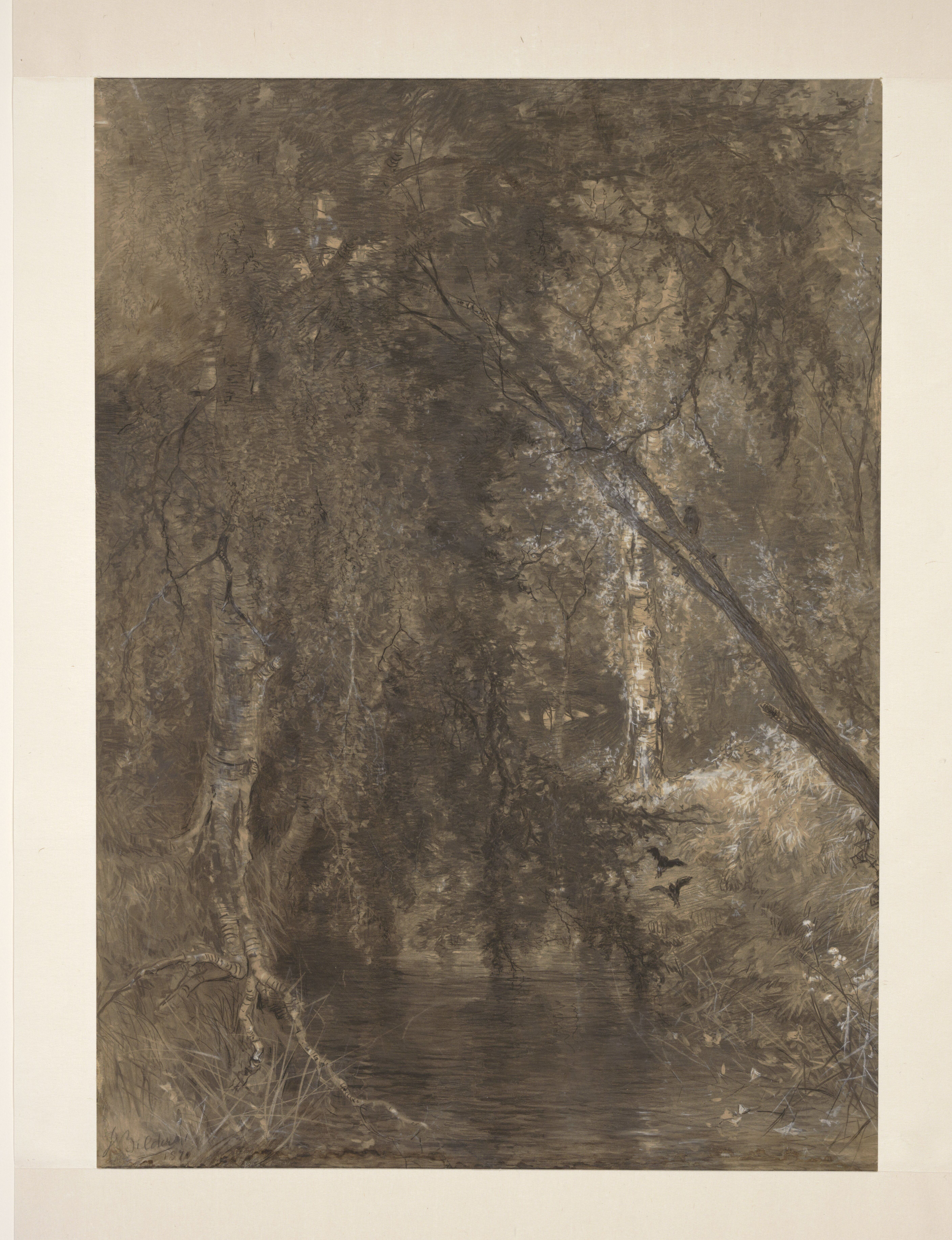
J.W. Bilders: View in the Woods with a small water, c. 1870: watercolor and pencil

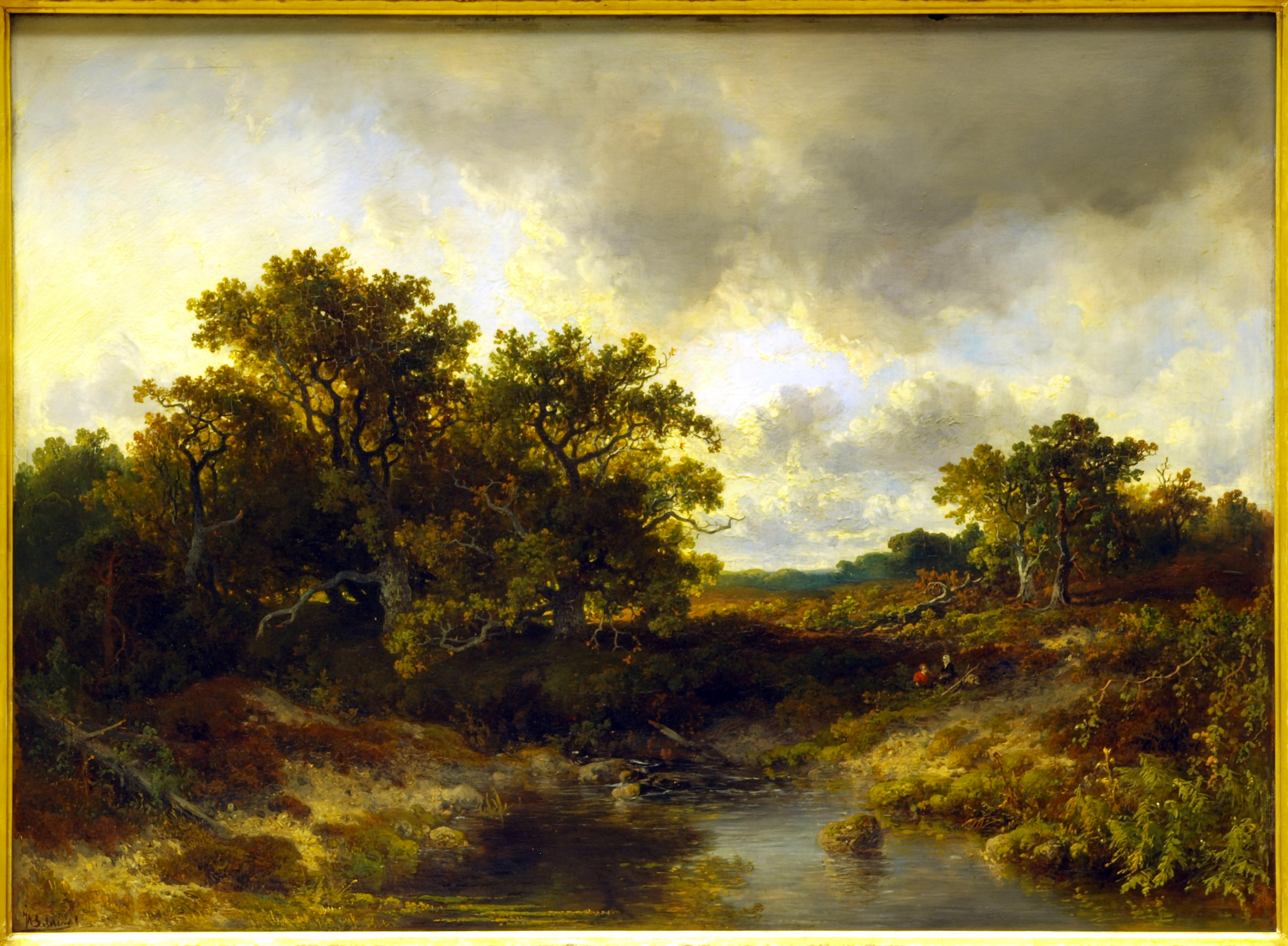
J.W. Bilders: Wolfhezen Heath, c. 1860–75; oil on canvas - collection Teylers Museum.

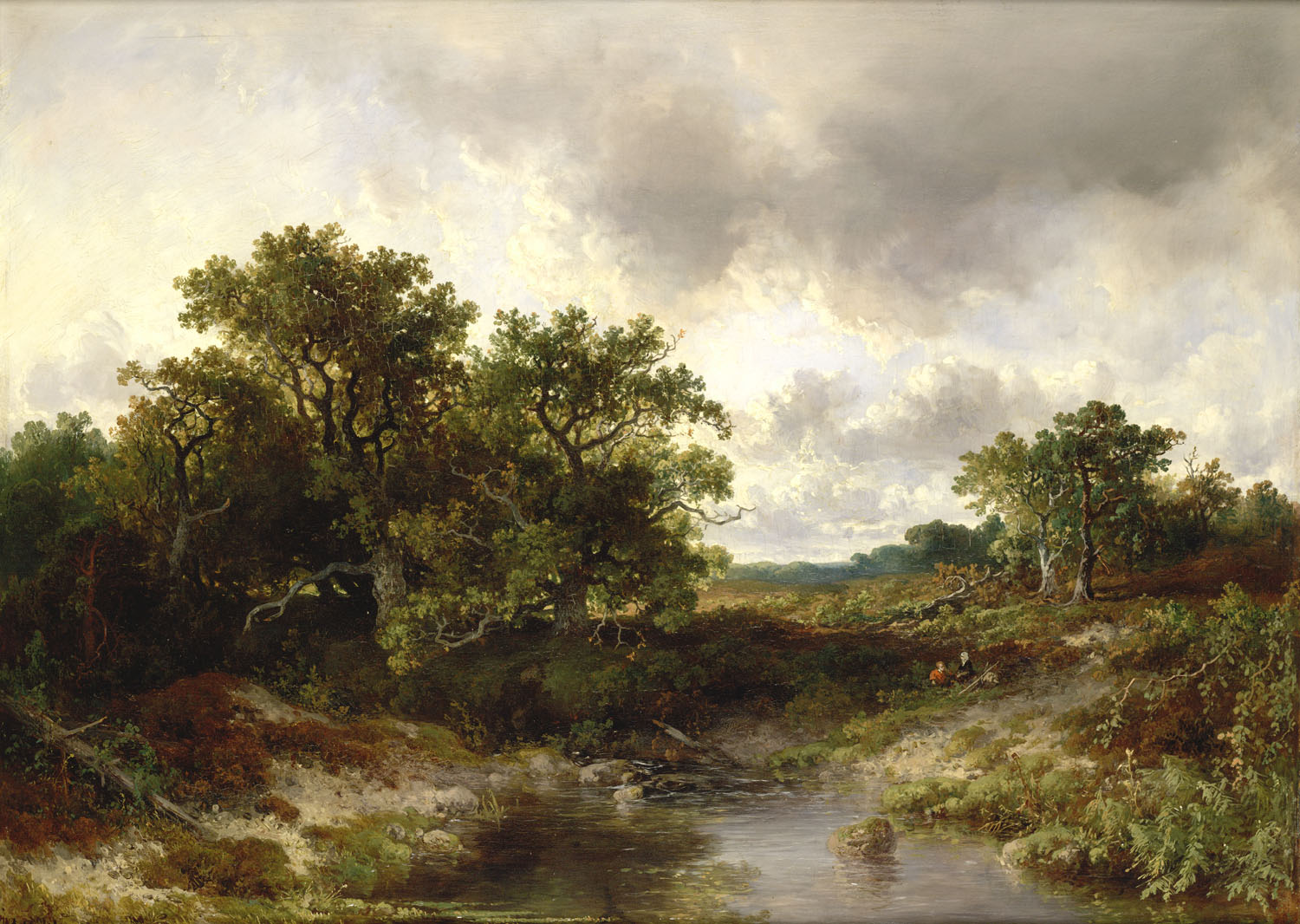
J.W. Bilders: Wolfhezen, c. 1860–75; oil on panel

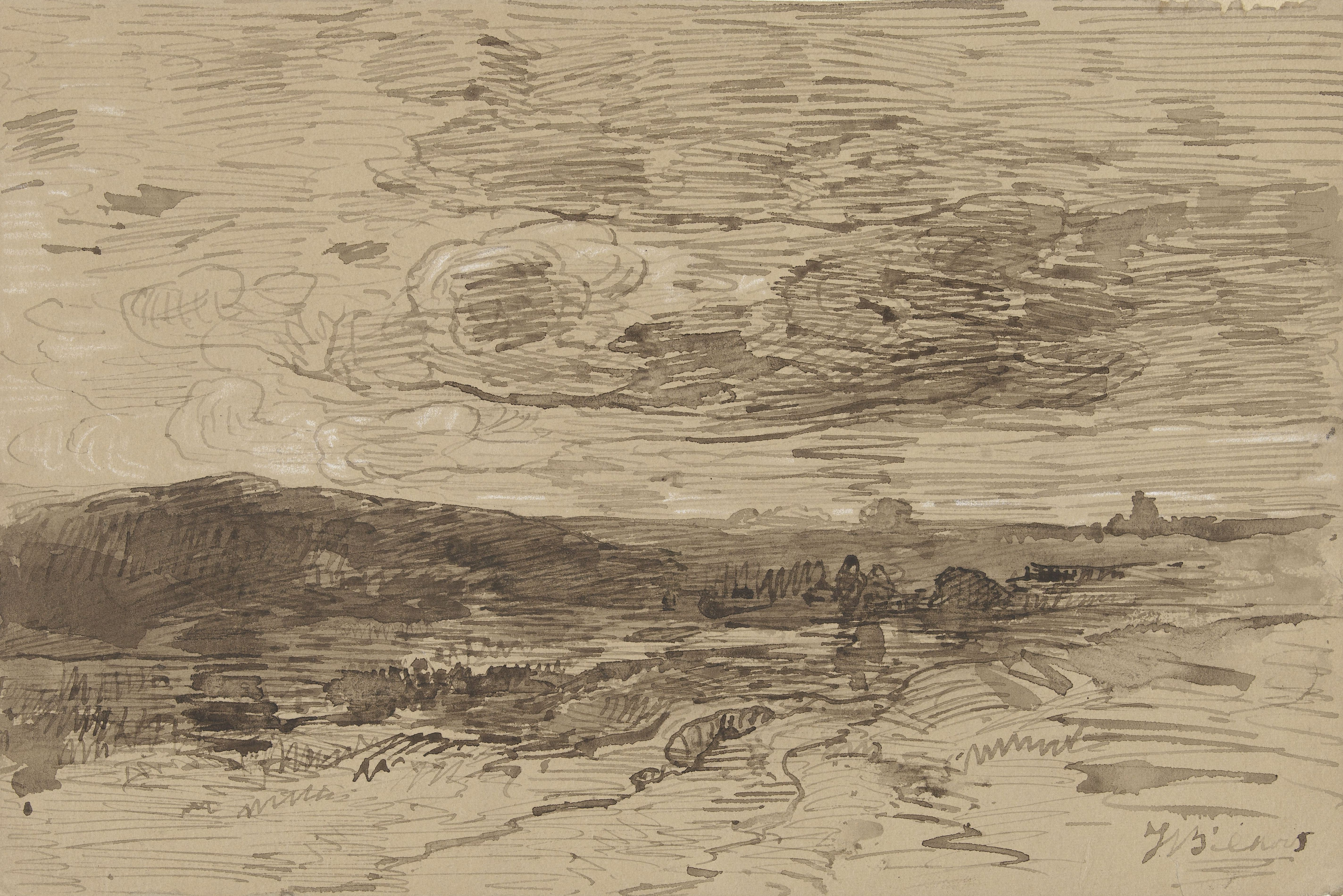
J.W. Bilders: Heath-land in Drenthe, 1880; ink-drawing

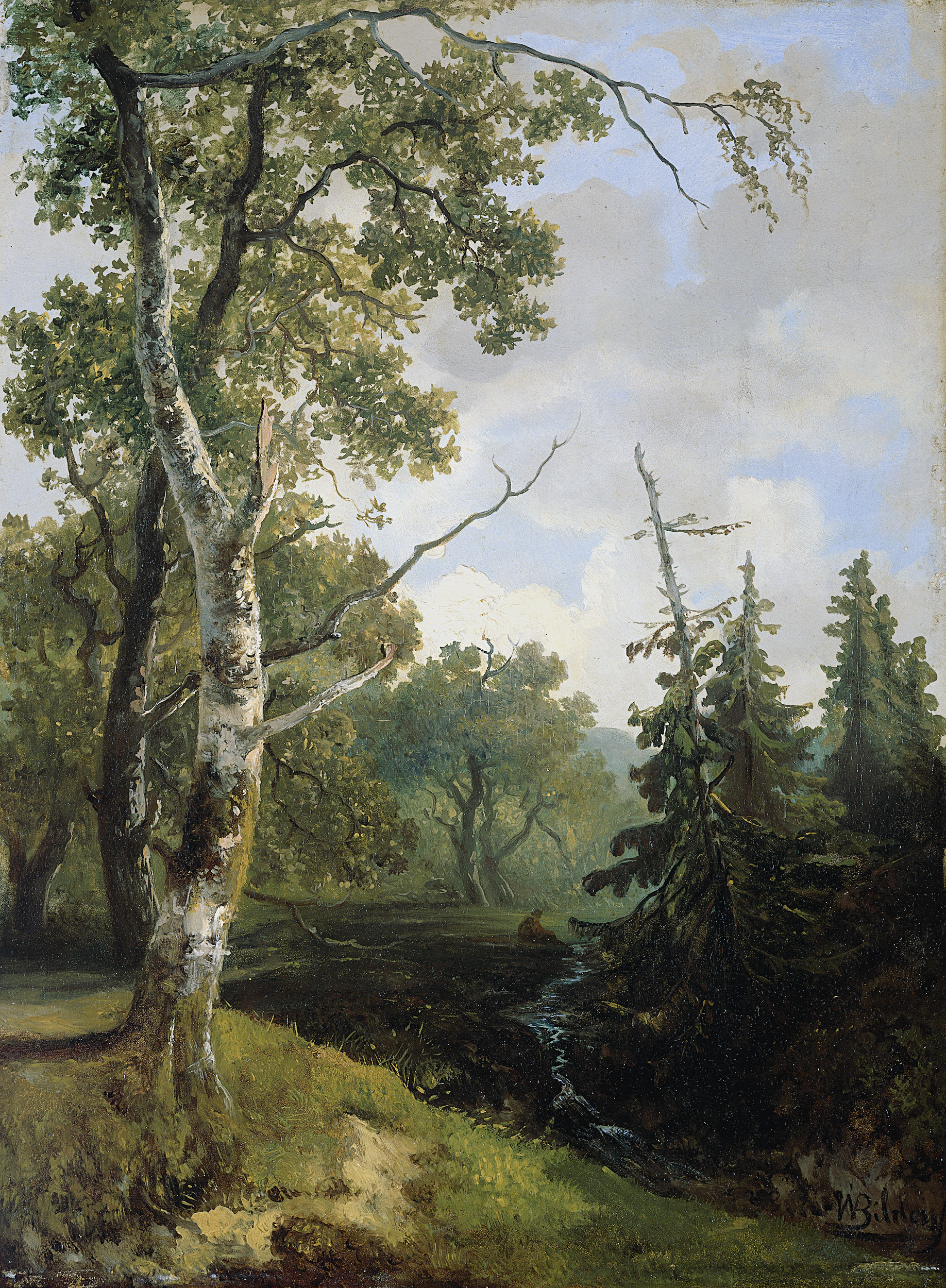
J.W. Bilders: View of the Forest near Wolfheze, c. 1870–85; oil-painting

== Sources ==
- Marius, Gerharda Hermina, Dutch Painters of the 19th Century, The Antique Collectors' Club, Woodbridge, Suffolk
