= Duizendjarige den =

Tree near Wolfheze, Netherlands

Coordinates: 51°59′45″N 5°48′16″E

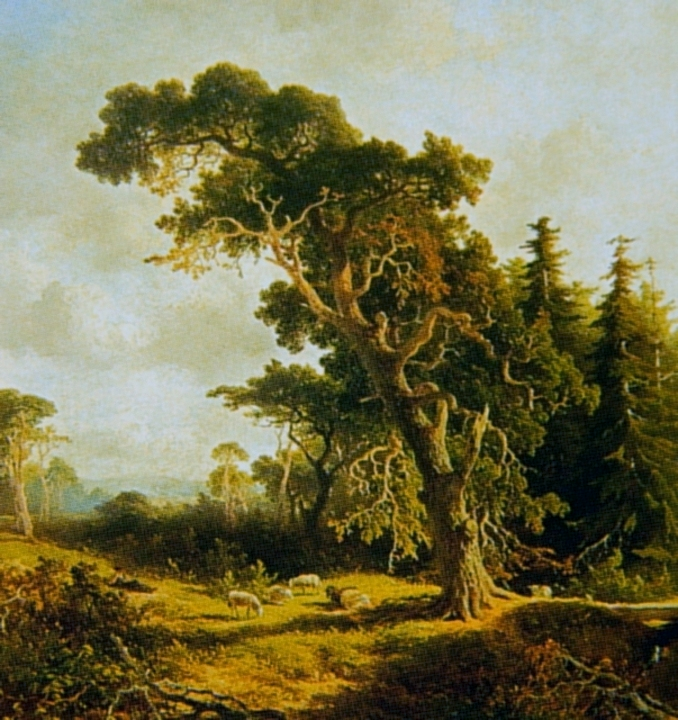
De Duizendjarige den painted by Johannes Warnardus Bilders (ca. 1850)

The Duizendjarige den was a scots pine (Pinus sylvestris) in the Wolfhezerbossen near Wolfheze, Netherlands. The tree fell down on 28 May 2006. It is estimated that the tree was nearly four hundred years old.

The tree did not show any signs of illness but the trunk was hollow. The trunk had a perimeter of 4.3 m (14 ft), a diameter of 1.37 m (4.5 ft) and was 22 m (72 ft) tall. It is estimated that the tree germinated around the year 1600 and that it was one of the oldest trees in the Netherlands before it fell down.

The name Duizendjarige den (Dutch language: "thousand year pine") was thought up during the second half of the nineteenth century by a group of landscape painters connected with the Oosterbeekse school.

== Estimating the age ==
The most reliable estimation of the age is according to Xander van der Burg done by E. J. Dik with the help of a branch that broke off the tree in 1971. With the help of an accretion drill it was possible to drill a piece of wood out of the branch with as result that the growth rings could be counted. The branch had a total of 238 growth rings and the researchers concluded that the tree must be around 400 years old.

The calculation took place in 1995, which makes it 24 years after the branch broke off the tree. They estimated that it took four years for the tree to reach chest height and which sets the minimum age of the tree at 266. However, a part of the drill core was missing so the researchers estimated that the tree was probably a hundred to a hundred and fifty years older.
