= Willem Maris =

Dutch landscape painter (1844-1910)

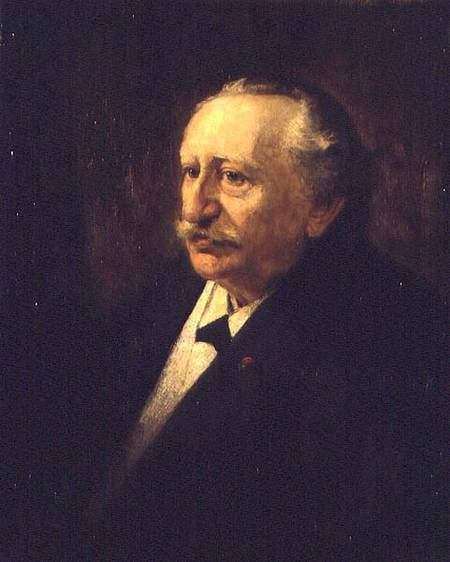
Willem Maris; portrait by Floris Arntzenius (1903)

Willem Maris (18 February 1844 – 10 October 1910) was a Dutch landscape painter of the Hague School.

== Biography ==
He was born in The Hague. Willem was the third in a family of five children. His two brothers Jacob and Matthijs Maris preceded him as painters. In literature he is often characterized as a self-taught man, and Maris described his early study years as follows: "From the time I was young I worked outdoors. Even before I was twelve I would sit in the meadow and watch the cows before and after school. As my brothers were older than me, naturally I got part of my training from them, and in the winters I went to the Academy of Art, where I often drew from plaster models and also often practiced drawing in perspective. In the summer I always studied outdoors, and in the winter in the stable." Maris also received advice from the cattle painter Pieter Stortenbeker, who gave him work to copy.

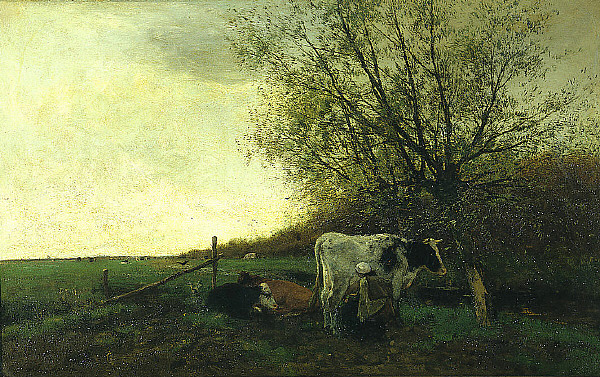
Milking Time, oil on canvas

In 1862, Maris made his debut with Cows on the Heath, which may have been painted in Oosterbeek, which he visited for the first time that year. It was in Oosterbeek that he met Gerard Bilders and Anton Mauve. Maris would write about his legendary meeting with Mauve:

a couple of days afterwards I was sitting somewhere and painting-when one of these braggarts came up behind me. Well, hey, when you're young, you don't think that's very nice. And suddenly the guy throws his arms around me and roars: 'I sit here all day long plodding away with a pencil -scratching and scratching-and you get it right away!' It was ... Mauve.

They would remain good friends for the rest of their lives.

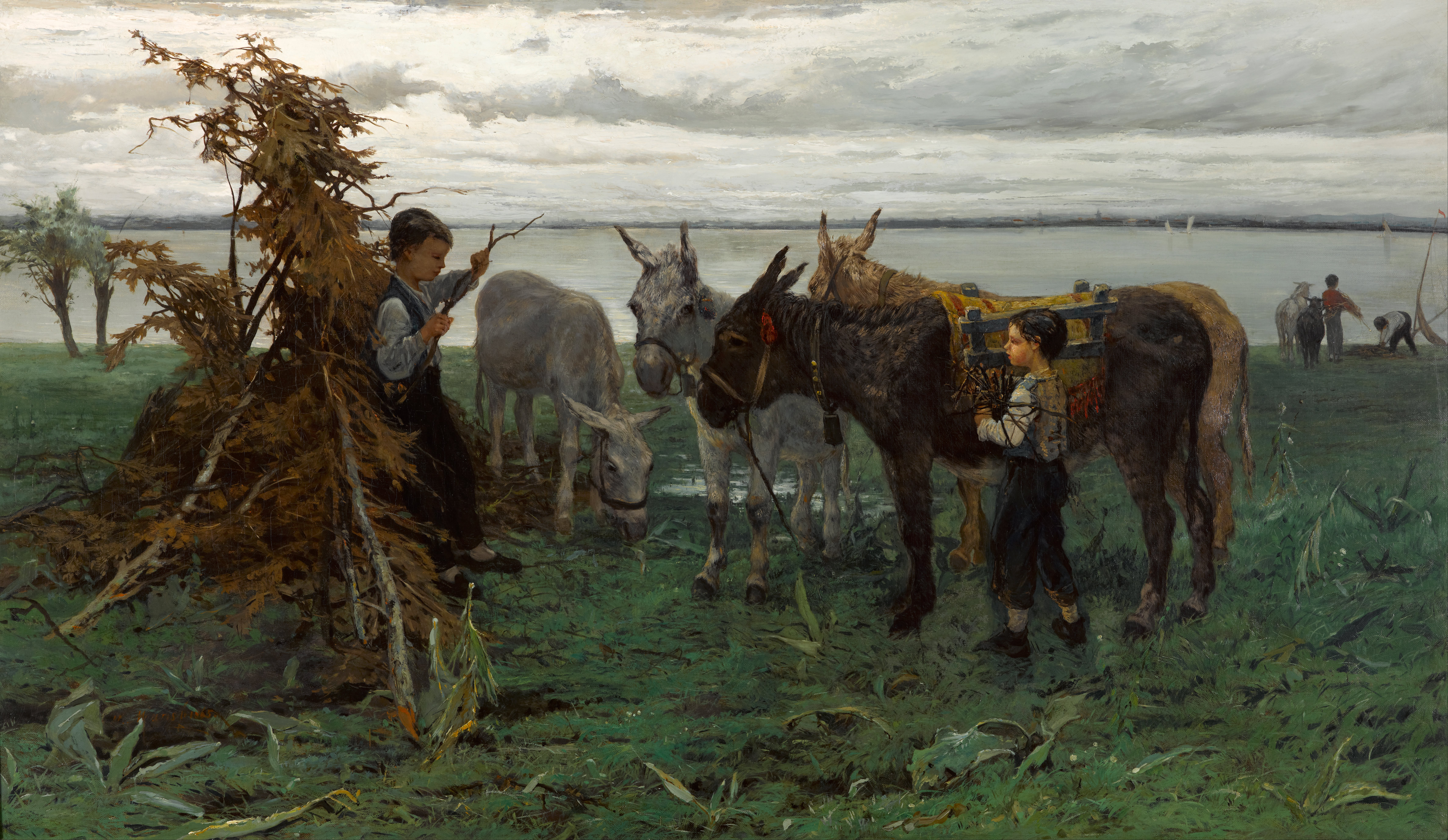
Boys herding Donkeys

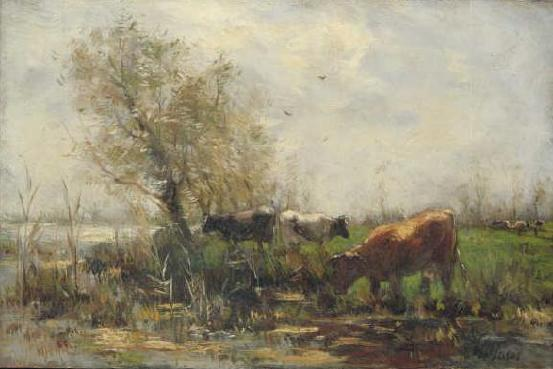
Cows at a Lake, oil on canvas

In 1863, the Mauve family moved and set a studio where all the three brothers could work. As his brothers had done before him, Willem also took a trip along the Rhine. Later he shared a studio with Bernard Blommers, and Matthijs Maris and Anton Mauve could often be found there. In the Mauritshuis, Willem copied the works of Paulus Potter, a seventeenth-century cattle painter who also inspired Gerard Bilders, Jan Hendrik Weissenbruch and the Barbizon painters.

Willem's painting career progressed regularly and he maintained a steady production. For his entire life he remained true to the subjects he had chosen in his youth: meadow landscapes with willows and ditches, cows or calves in a meadow, by a river or pond, and later ducks and chickens. His paintings and watercolors are best known for his emphasis on light. Maris' often cited motto was: "I don't paint cows, but rather effects of light." His early work in particular often contained a cool, cloudy atmosphere. Someone wrote: " In those days, the young painter had a pronounced preference for shrouds of mist, which is quite peculiar. On several occasions he angrily broke off his study trips as soon as the sun and wind had chased away the early morning mist."

Three major phases can be distinguished in his work. The first works were characterized by an exact reproduction of the surroundings. Maris was still finding his way in the anatomical portrayal of cattle. In the second phase he had completely mastered this and his use of color became more definite. The meadows and trees are painted in gradations of saturated shades of green.

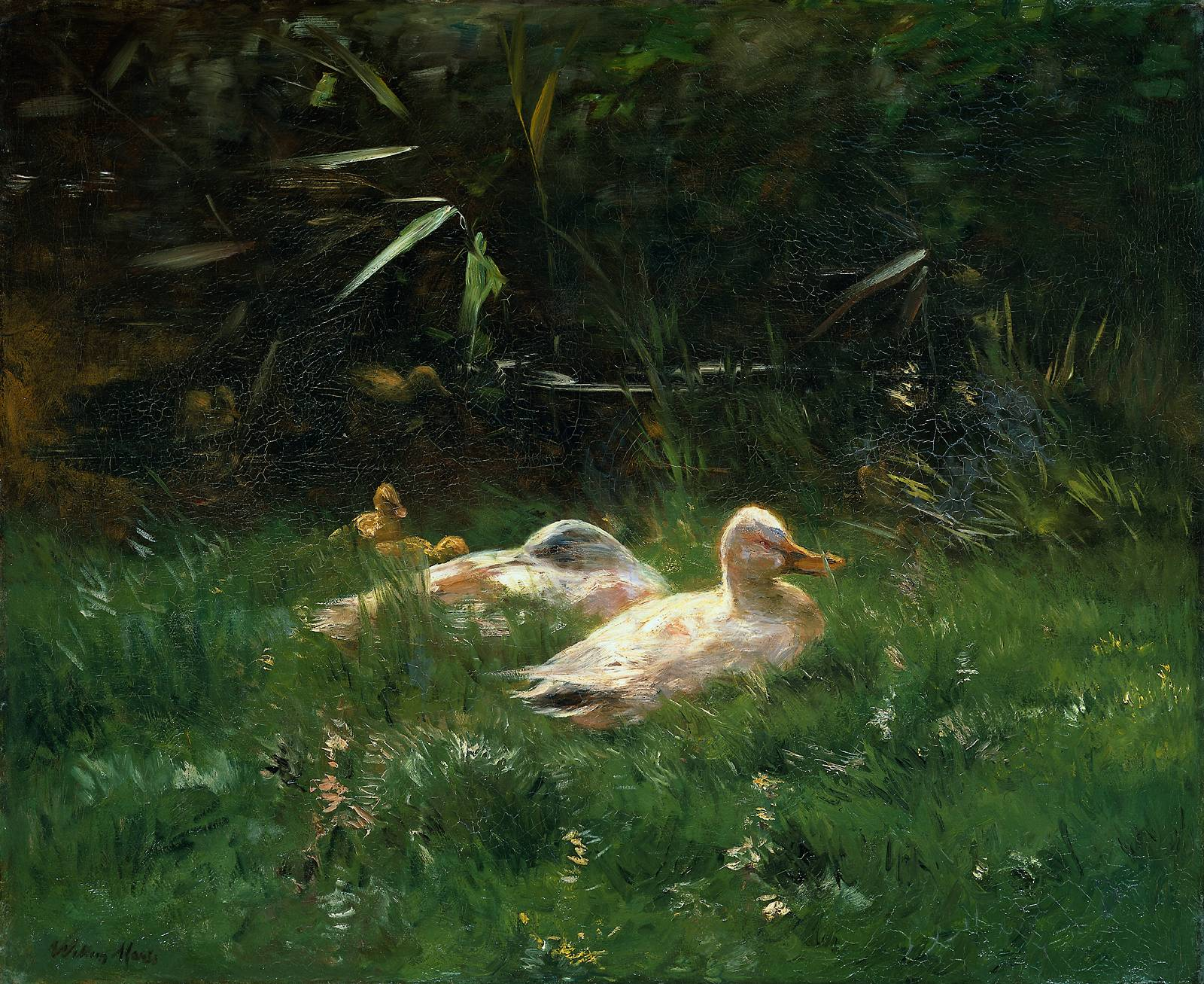
Ducks, oil on canvas, Rijksmuseum Amsterdam

Around 1880, he began to use broader strokes, combining this with impasto. Yet these works have an intimate atmosphere. His lively use of color distinguished Maris from the 'gray mood' of his contemporaries, and he was often called the 'impressionist' of the Hague School.

Maris wrote that he never had any students, but about 1880, George Hendrik Breitner must have studied with him. He also taught his son, Simon Willem and certainly influenced others. When Maris was in his sixties, he often seemed tired of life. He went to Karlsbad a few times to take the waters, as his brother Jacob had done. On 10 October he died in The Hague.

== Sources ==
- Sillevis, John and Tabak, Anne, The Hague School Book, Waanders Uitgegevers, Zwolle, 2004 (pp 311–320)
