= Gerard Bilders =

Dutch landscape painter (1838-1865)

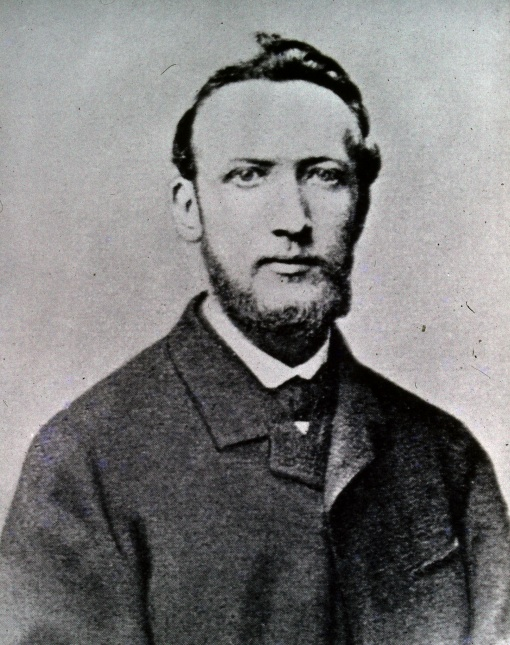
- Bilders c. 1865
- Born: Albertus Gerardus Bilders; 9 December 1838; Utrecht, Netherlands
- Died: 8 March 1865; Amsterdam, Netherlands
- Known for: Landscape painting
- Movement: Hague School

Albertus Gerardus "Gerard" Bilders (9 December 1838 – 8 March 1865) was a Dutch landscape painter, associated with some members of the Hague School, such as Anton Mauve and Willem Maris.

== Biography ==
Bilders was born in Utrecht, where he lived until 1856, though from 1841 to 1845 the Bilders family lived in Oosterbeek, a village near Arnhem which later became a major center for Dutch plein-air-painters. His father, Johannes Warnardus Bilders, was a landscape painter and gave Gerard his first drawing lessons. In 1857 Gerard moved to The Hague.

Bilders was financially supported by the Dutch writer Johannes Kneppelhout who lived in Oosterbeek since 1851, where he inhabited a rural estate and invited several young artists as his protégés. Kneppelhout was rather critical of Bilders's painterly talent and tried to push him into a more literary direction, which Gerard refused. The two men wrote for several years many letters which were published by Kneppelhout [including Bilders' diary-notes of 1860 and 1862], shortly after Bilders' death in 1865.

From the start of his artistic career Bilders' focus was on landscape painting but also on animals in the landscape. Bilders studied at the Academy of Visual Arts in The Hague from about 1857 to 1859 and drew nude and dressed models there. In the Mauritshuis museum he copied Paulus Potter's landscapes with cattle; for a while he was the pupil of landscape and animal painter Charles Humbert in Switzerland. From time to time Gerard Bilders would assist his father by filling in his landscape paintings with animals, as he did in 1859 by painting some goats in a large forest-landscape of his father, commissioned by a Russian art-seller.

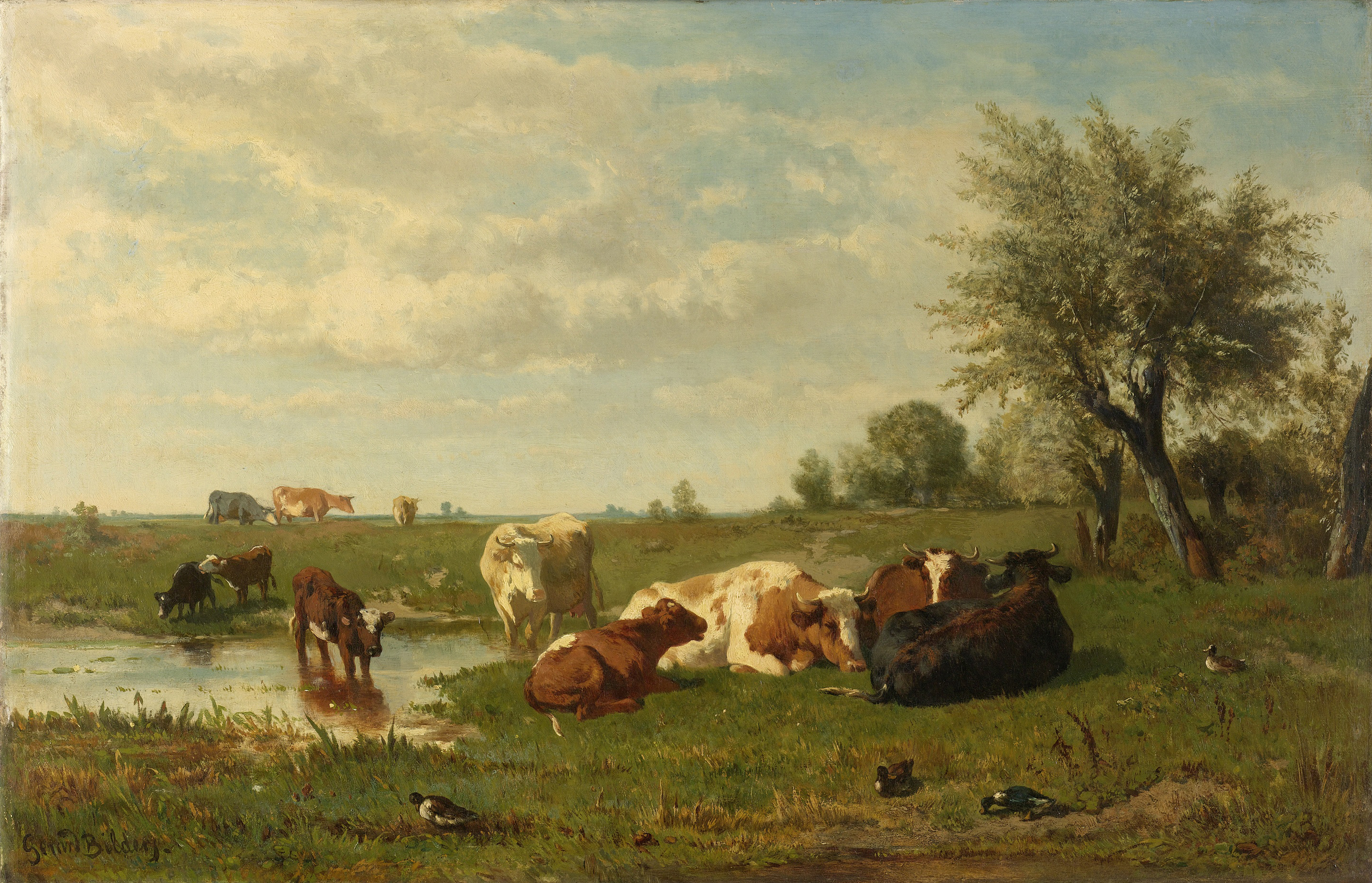
'Landscape with cows in the Meadow', c. 1860–1864

In 1860 they traveled together to the 'Exposition Générale des Beaux-Arts' in Brussel where he became acquainted for the first time in his life with the painters of the French School of Barbizon. Two times he made a voyage to Switzerland/France; the first time as of September 1858, when he painted there together with some artist-friends in open air, in the Savoy.

Later in 1859 he began painting in the county-area around Leiden, often 'meadows with cattle'. Here he tried to reproduce the moods that the Dutch flat landscape evoked by using peculiar light effects as well as 'a colored, fragrant warm grey.' In July 1860 he wrote: "I am searching for a tone, which we call 'colored grey'. I mean that all colors, even the strongest, can be brought together in such a way as to give the impression of a warm, vital grey.". When he mixed all the colors of the palette just with grey to get this graying effect, he was usually dissatisfied with the result. His attempts in mixing unbroken colors foreshadowed the later tonal painting style of the Hague School painters.

Gerard Bilders returned to Oosterbeek from 1857 to 1864 where he met Anton Mauve and the Maris brothers, in particular Willem Maris. He died in Amsterdam from tuberculosis when he was only 26.

== Artistic development and style ==
At the end of 1856 and beginning of 1857 Bilders was frequently visiting the Mauritshuis in The Hague, where he studied and copied the paintings of 17th-century Dutch landscape painters, in particular the works of Paulus Potter and Jacob Ruisdael. He then also wrote his mentor Kneppelhout in a letter how he sought and found refuge in these works; he felt himself being outside – in the landscape itself, while watching them in the museum. The paintings of Potter and Ruisdael inspired him to copy them carefully and faithfully, but now already he started to recognize at the same time in their works 'the landscape as a whole'! This was a characteristic point of interest for him, that would return again and again in his later letters and Journal notes. Apparently, 'wholeness' and 'unity' of the expressed landscape were essential elements for him. So he wrote for instance later, on 19 May 1861: "It is not my aim and object to paint a cow for the cow's sake or a tree for the tree's, but by means of the whole – to create a beautiful and huge impression which nature sometimes creates, also with most simple means".

== Gallery - ranked by year ==
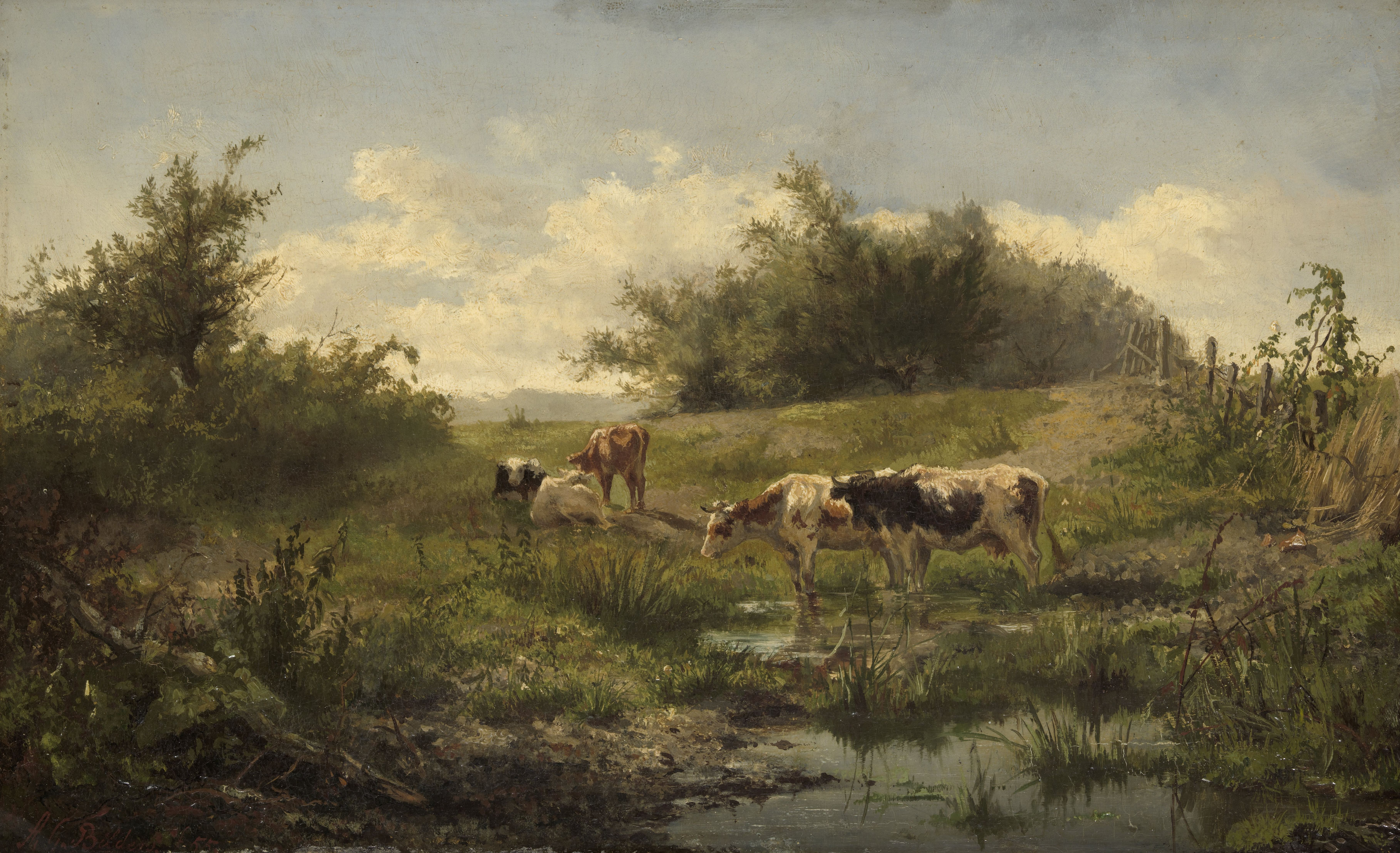
'Landscape with cows at a puddle', 1856–58; oil on panel

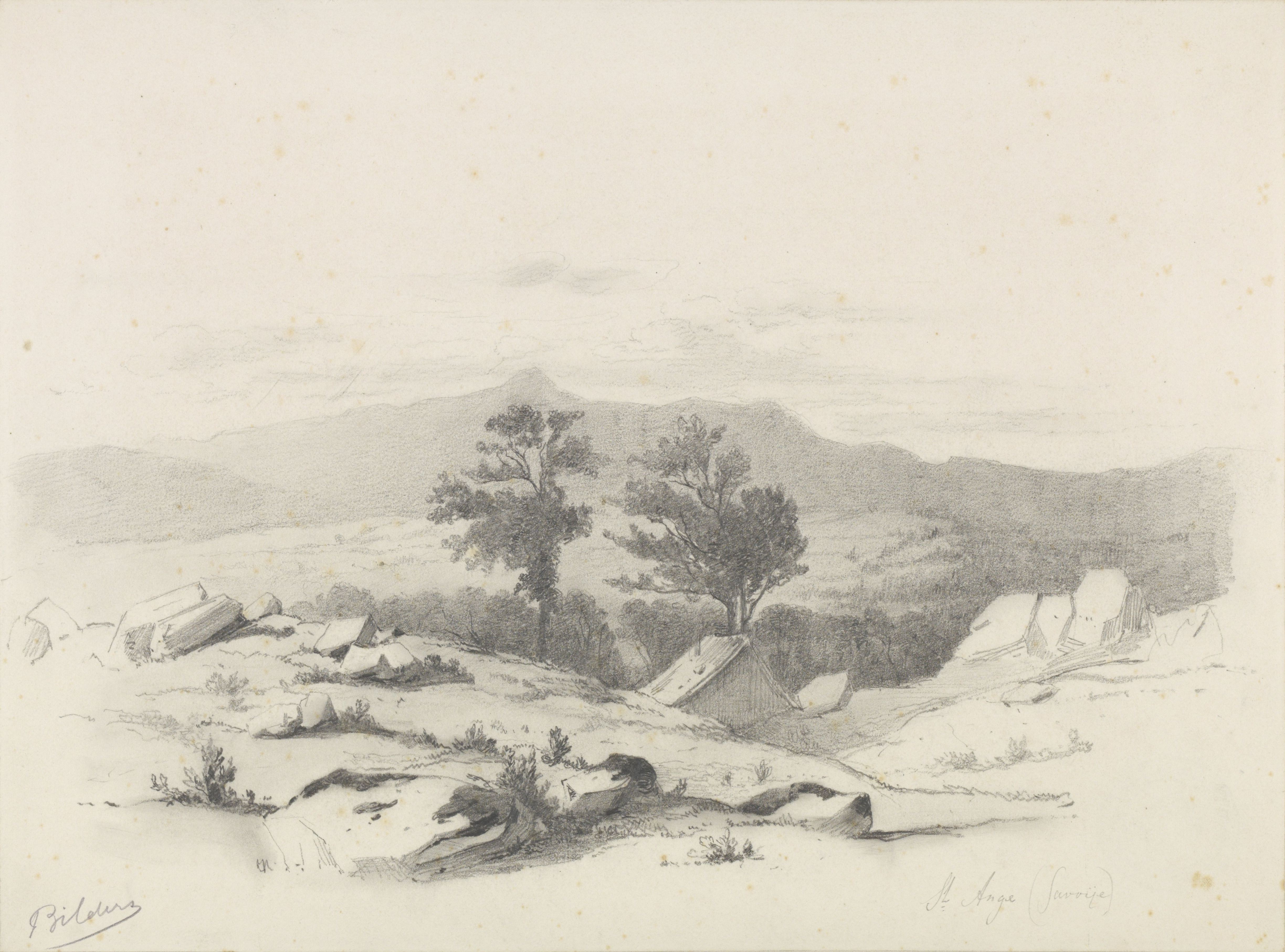
'View on the village St. Ange, Savoije', 1858; drawing in pencil

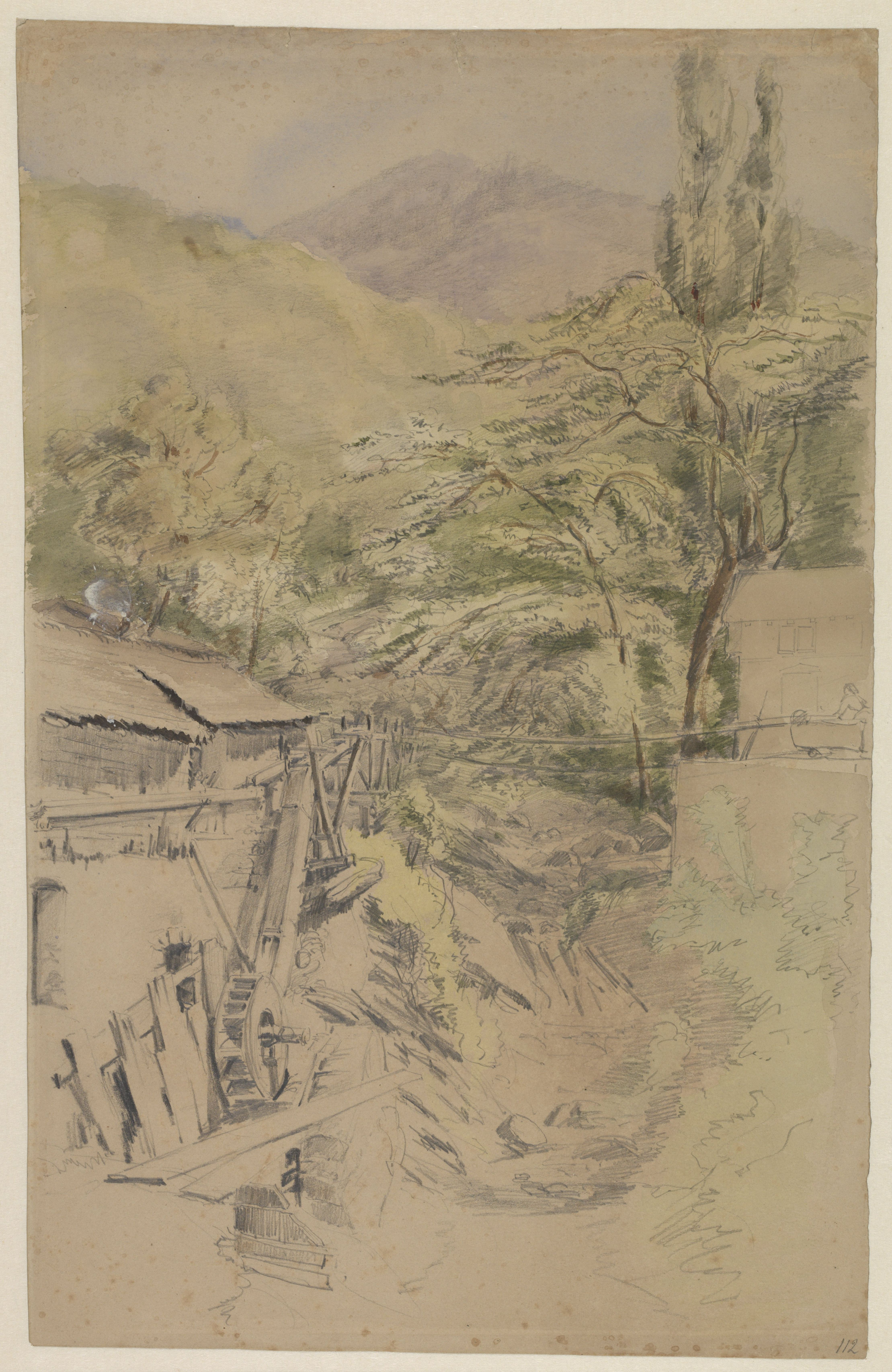
'Mountain-landscape with watermill', 1858; drawing with pencil and watercolor

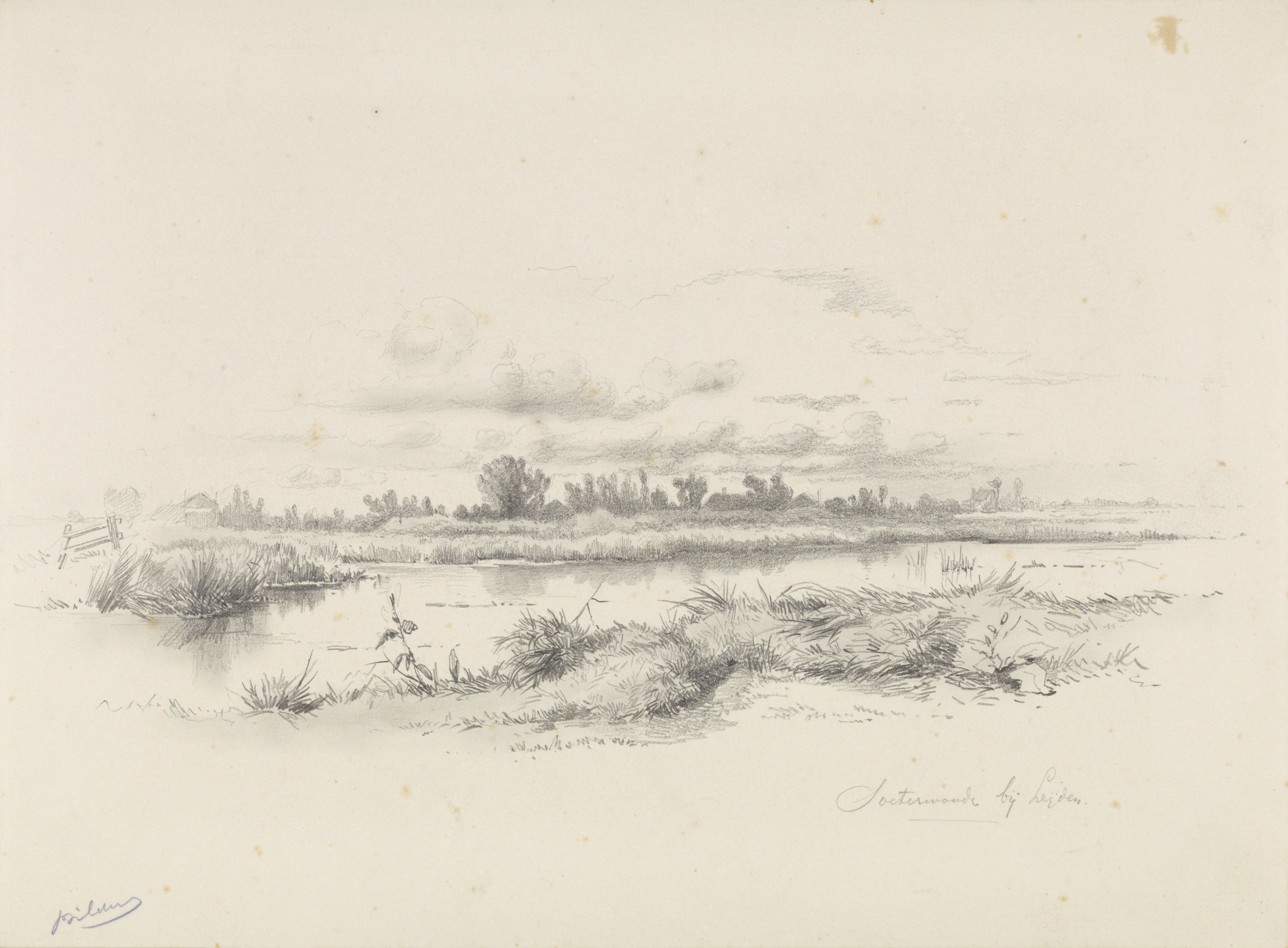
'View over the water near Leiden', 1859; drawing with pencil

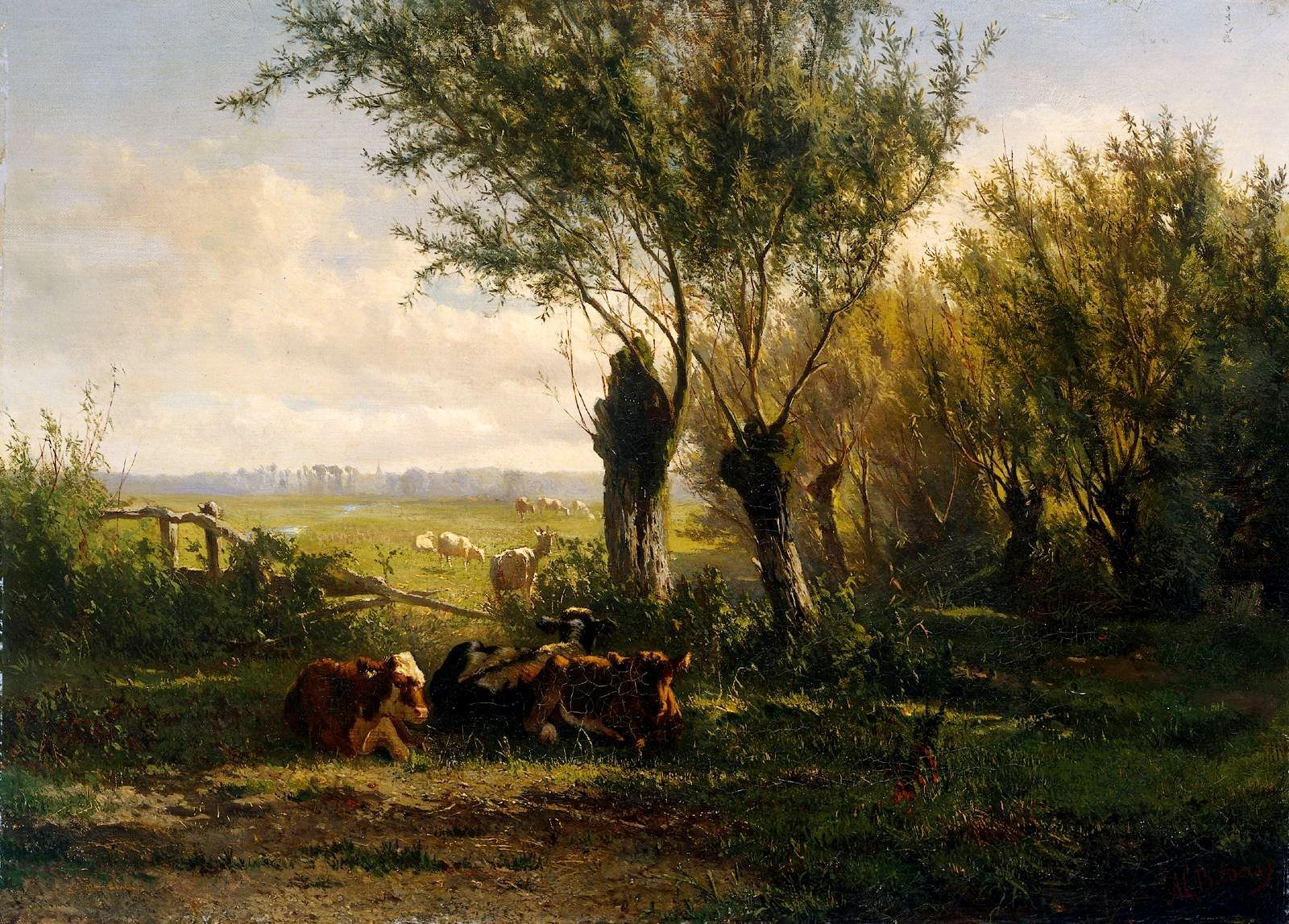
'Meadow near Oosterbeek', 1860; oil on canvas

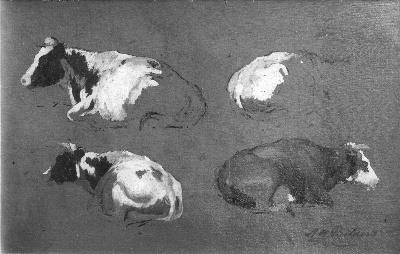
'Cow studies', c. 1860; on paper

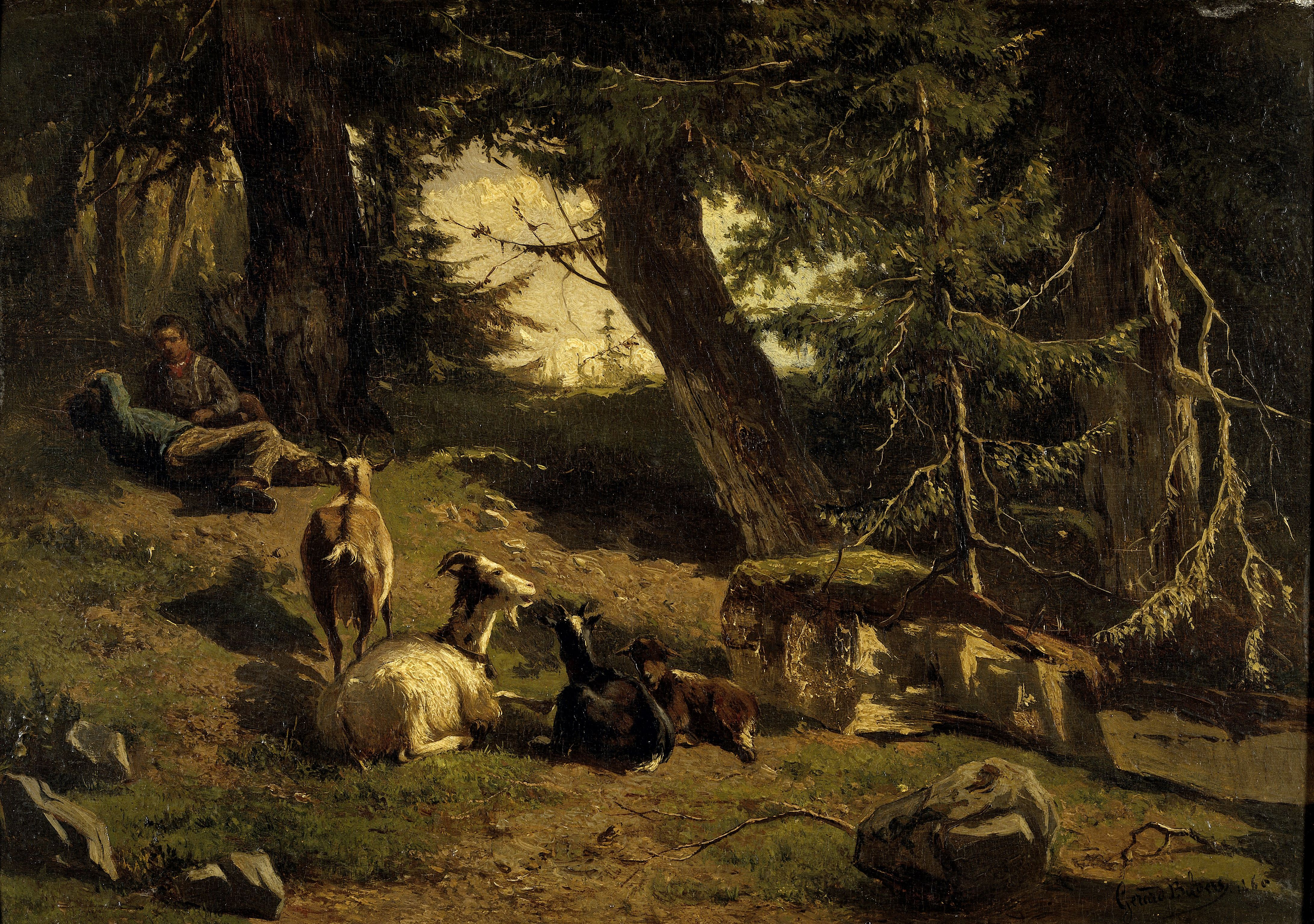
'Swiss landscape with two goatskin', 1860; oil on panel

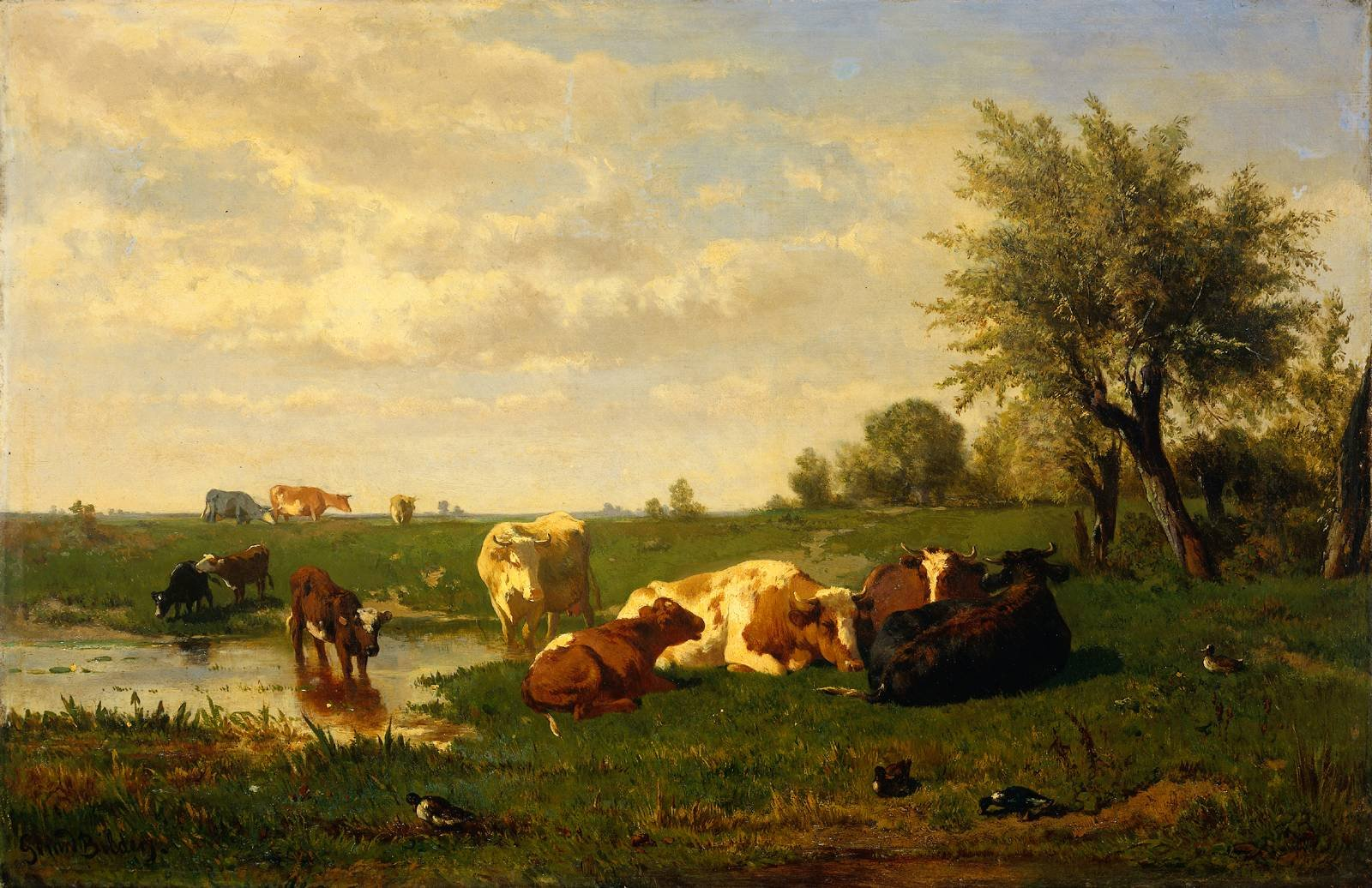
'Cows in the Meadow', 1861; oil on canvas

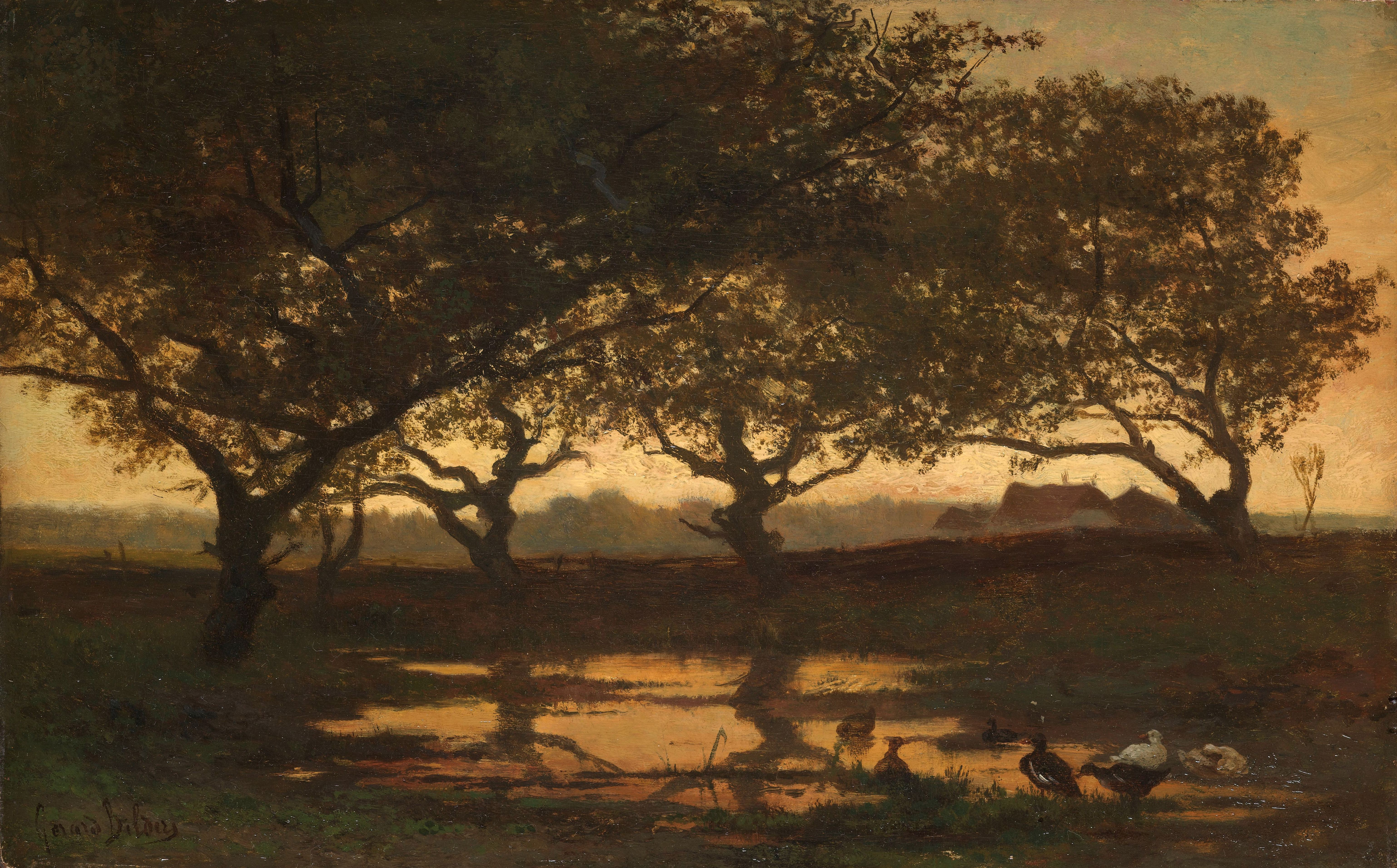
'Woodland Pond at Sunset', c. 1862; oil on panel

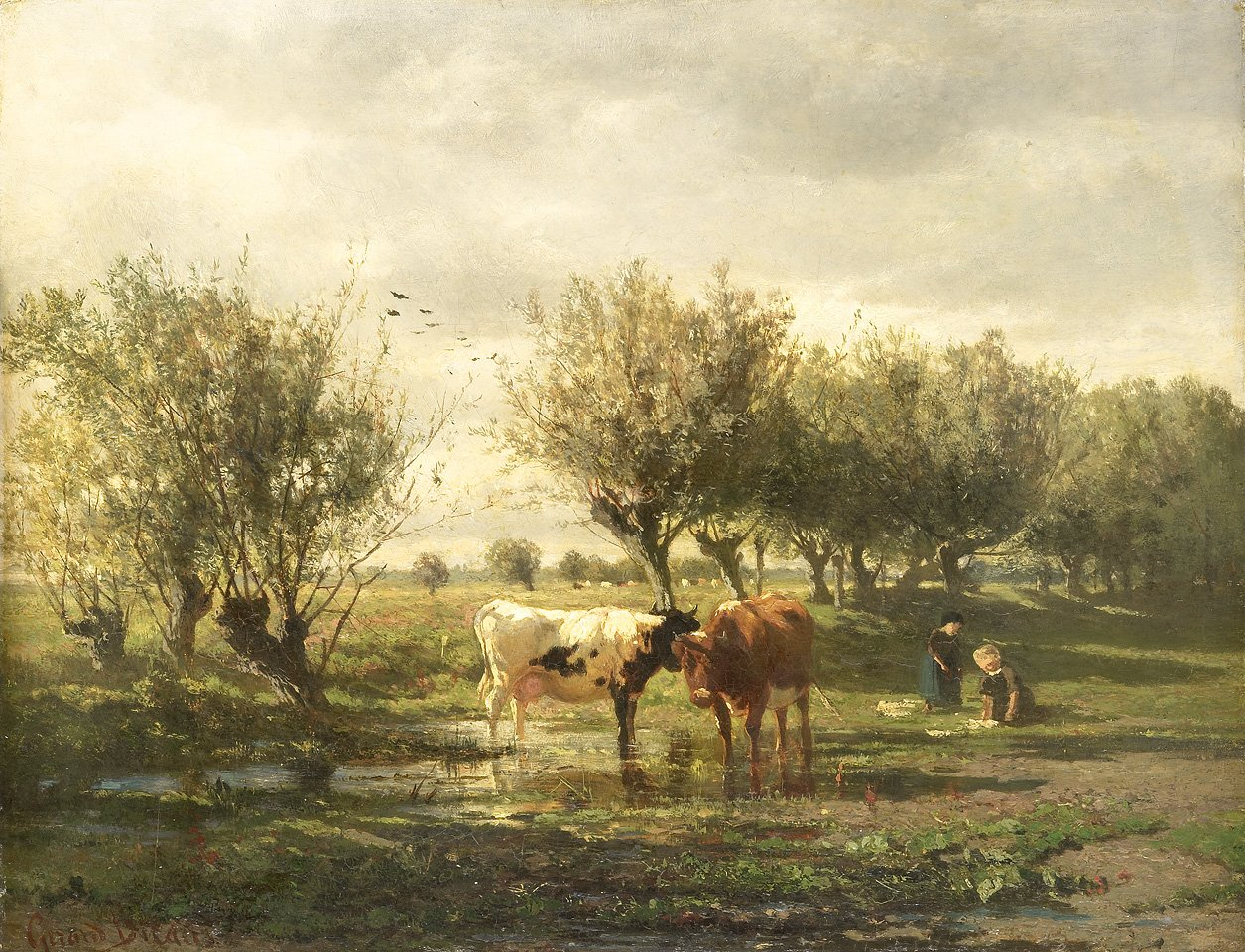
'Landscape with cows in a pool of water', c. 1860-65; oil on panel

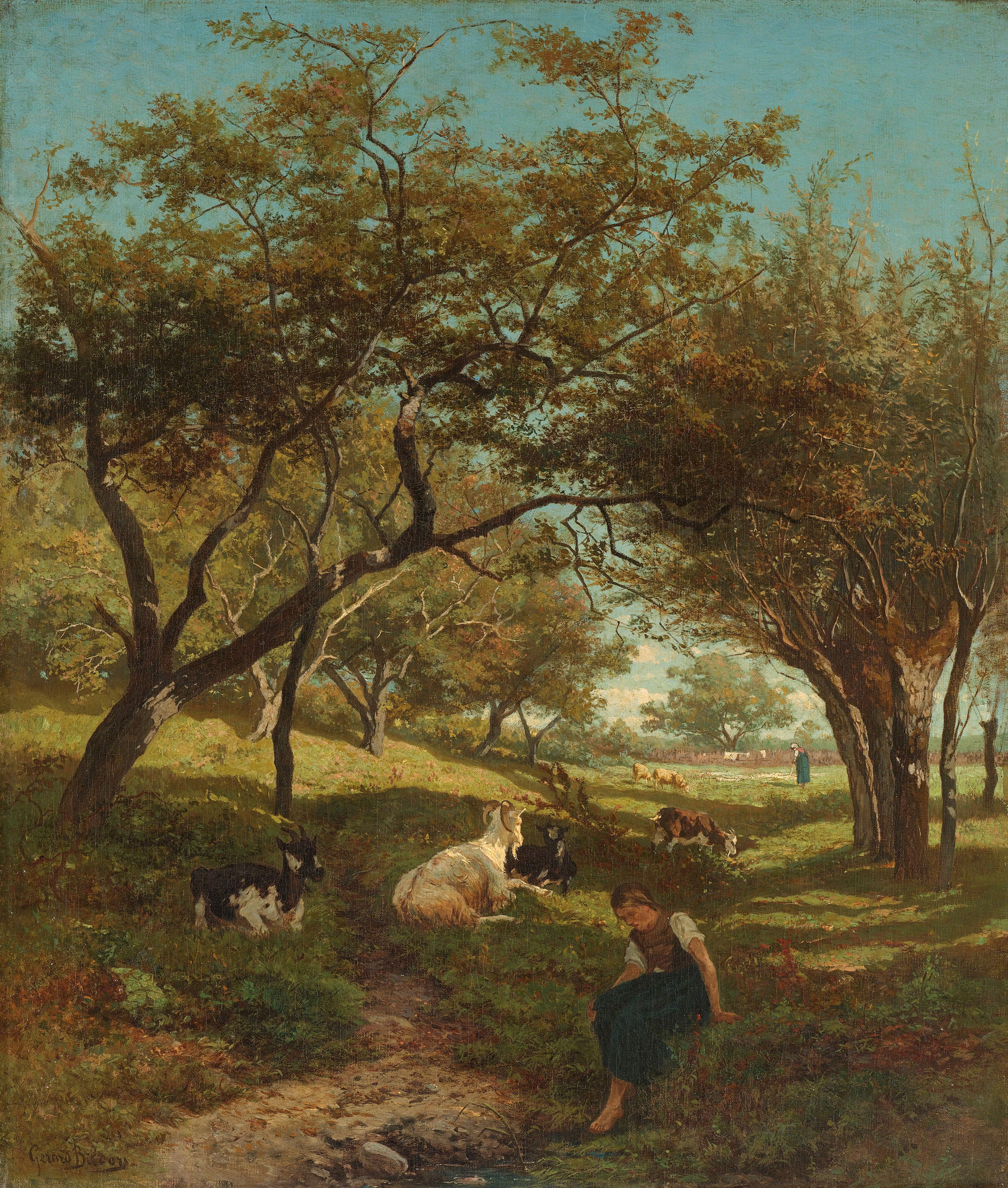
'Landscape with goatskin, resting in the shadows', 1864; oil on canvas

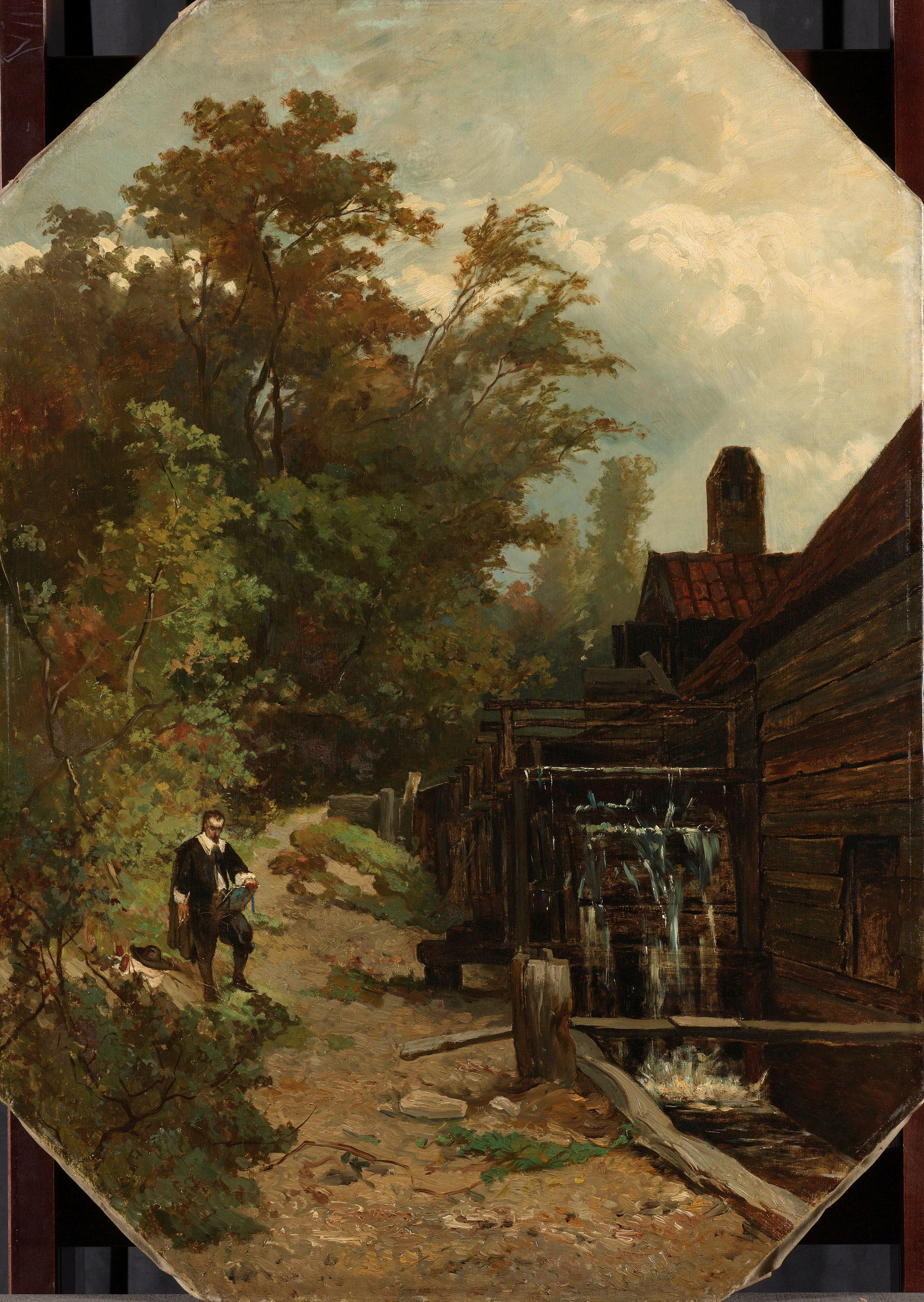
'Jacob van Ruisdael sketching a water mill, 1864; oil on canvas

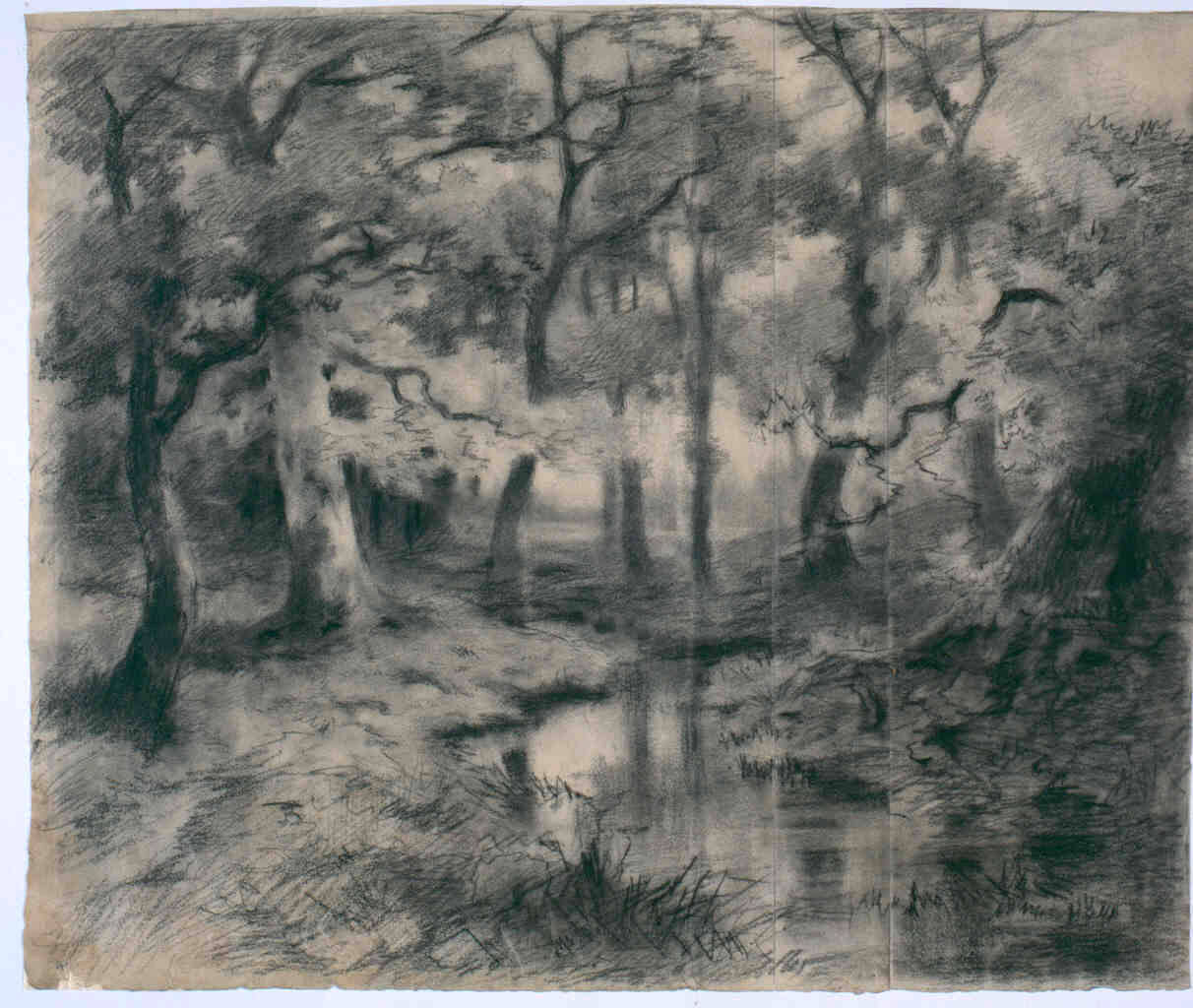
'Brook through the forest', undated; drawing on paper

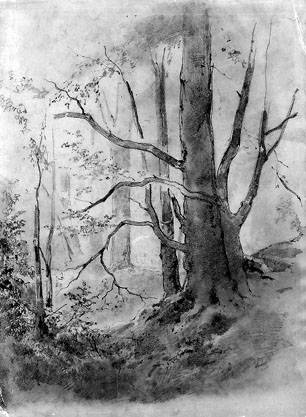
'View in the forest', undated; drawing on paper

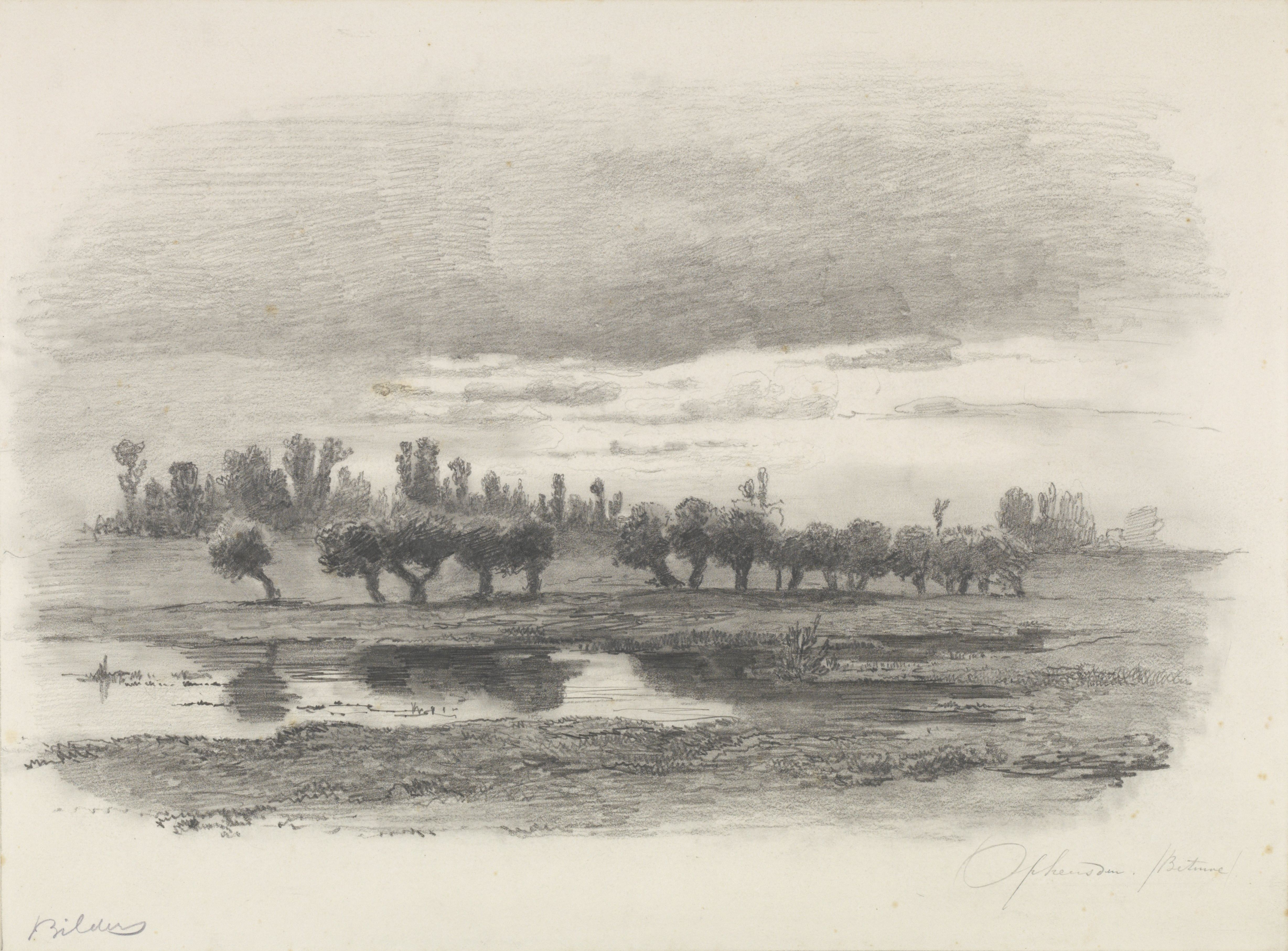
'View over the river-landscape near Opheusden', undated; pencil on paper

== Sources ==
- Sillevis, John and Tabak, Anne, The Hague School Book, Waanders Uitgegevers, Zwolle, 2004 (pp 281–387)
- Bilders, Gerard, at the RKD - the Netherlands Institute for Art History.
