= Taco Mesdag =

Dutch banker and painter

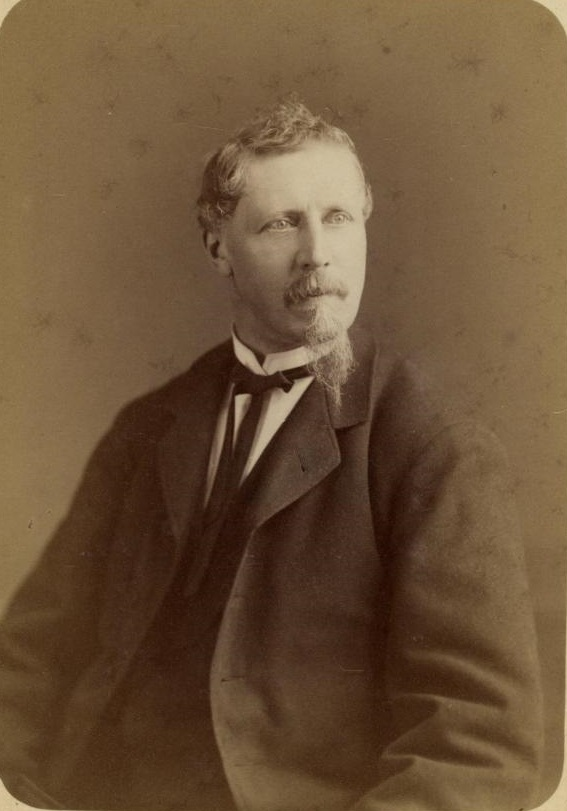
Taco Mesdag

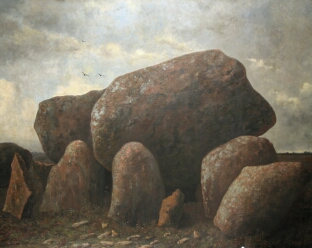
Dolmen (Hunebed D15) near Taarlo by Taco Mesdag

Taco Mesdag (Dutch pronunciation: [ˈtaːkoː ˈmɛzdɑx]; Groningen, 21 September 1829 – Den Haag, 4 August 1902) was a Dutch banker and painter.

Mesdag, son of the banker Klaas Mesdag and Johanna Willemina, worked with his younger brother Henry in the banking business of his family. Like his brother Hendrik Mesdag, he eventually also chose to paint as a profession. Together they played an important part in the Hague School Pulchri Studio, where Hendrik served as president and Taco as treasurer.

He was taught by Paul Gabriël, among others. Mesdag is best known as the painter of the landscape of Drenthe. Much of his work was donated by his widow, Geesje Mesdag-van Calcar, to the Groninger Museum.

On the Internet, many of his works are displayed in the Webmuseum Mesdagvancalcar.

== Sources ==
- Dutch Wikipedia Article
- Biography of Taco Mesdag at the Webmuseum Mesdagvancalcar
- Bryan, Michael: Dictionary of Painters and Engravers
