= Cornelis Lieste =

Dutch painter

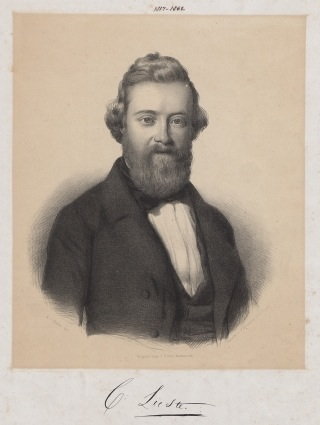
- Cornelis Lieste; portrait by Adrianus Johannes Ehnle
- Born: 26 October 1817; Haarlem, United Kingdom of the Netherlands
- Died: 24 July 1861 (aged 43); Haarlem, Netherlands

Cornelis Lieste (26 October 1817 - 24 July 1861) was a Dutch painter and lithographer. He specialized in Romantic style landscapes.

== Biography ==
In 1835, his father enrolled him at the Vocational School, where he studied drawing with Jan Reekers (1790-1858). From 1837 to 1838, he learned landscape painting from Nicolaas Johannes Roosenboom and, in 1839, won a silver medal at an exhibition in ’s-Hertogenbosch. This was followed by a study trip to Belgium and Germany. Many of his sketches were made in the dunes of North Holland. While travelling in Germany, he may have visited Kleve and studied briefly with Barend Cornelis Koekkoek.

In 1846, he was named a member of the artists' society, "Kunst Zij Ons Doel", and was given some administrative functions. Later that year, he was appointed a member of the Royal Academy of Art in Amsterdam. The following year, he became a Freemason and took a painting trip to the Harz mountains.

He was one of the artists who participated in decorating the "Parkzaal" at the Wertheimplantsoen during the celebration of Rembrandt's 400th birthday in 1852. He set off travelling again in 1853; visiting the Rhine region, Switzerland and North Italy; painting some of his few mountain landscapes. From 1854 to 1856, he was a regular guest at the artists' colony in Oosterbeek. Just before his death, he paid an extended visit to Twente and Drenthe, where he sketched the dolmens in addition to his usual landscapes.

In 1858, he married Johanna Cornelia Burman (1838-1887), but died two years later of an unspecified "chest disease"; leaving behind a two-year-old child, with another on the way.

Among his best known students, one may mention Hendrik Dirk Kruseman van Elten and Paul Gabriël. His works may be seen at the Rijksmuseum, the Amsterdam Museum, the Teylers Museum, the Museum Boijmans Van Beuningen and the Stedelijk Museum Zwolle.

== Selected works ==
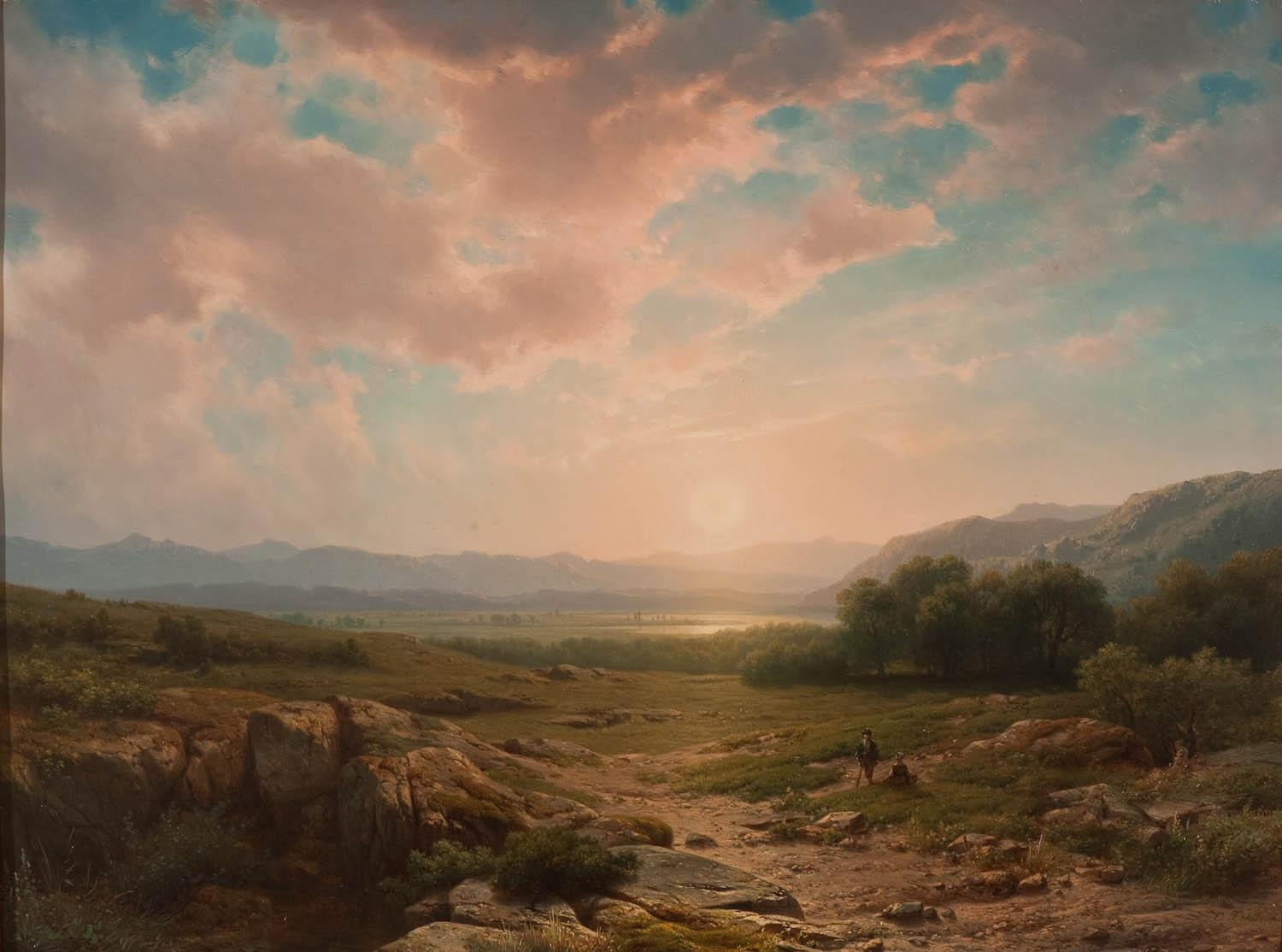
Landscape with a Couple Alone at Sunset

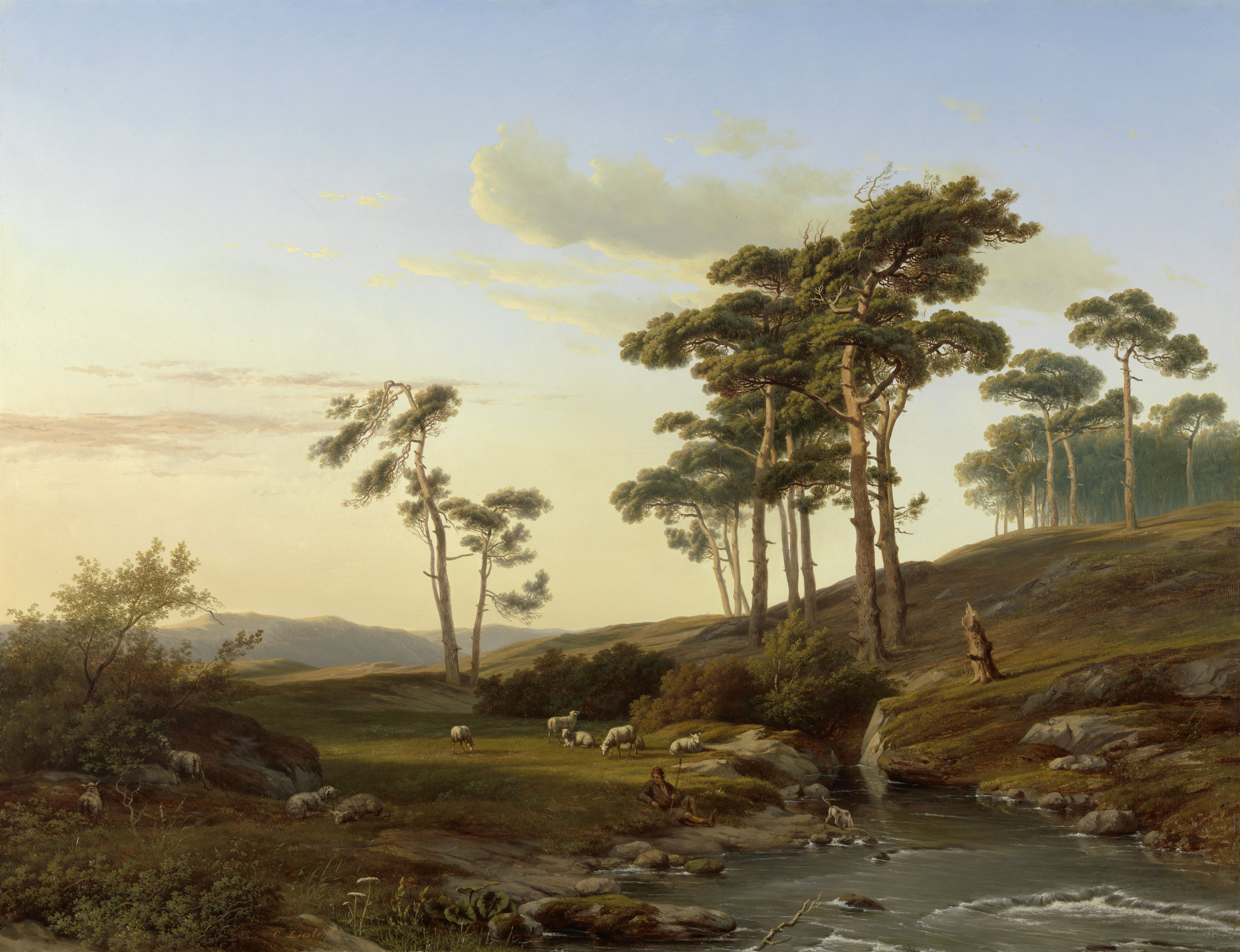
Evening Mood with Shepherd

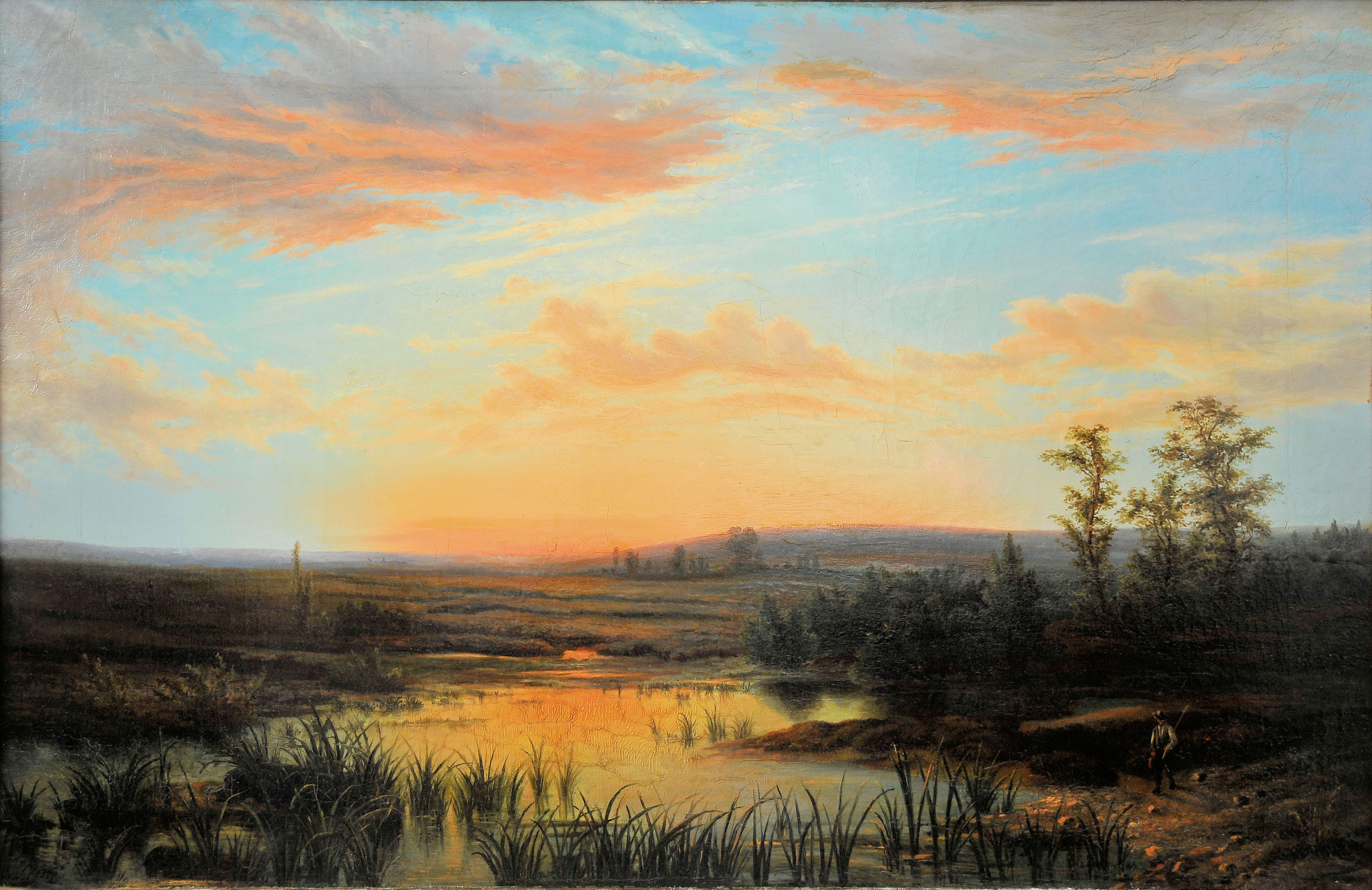
Heide bij avond

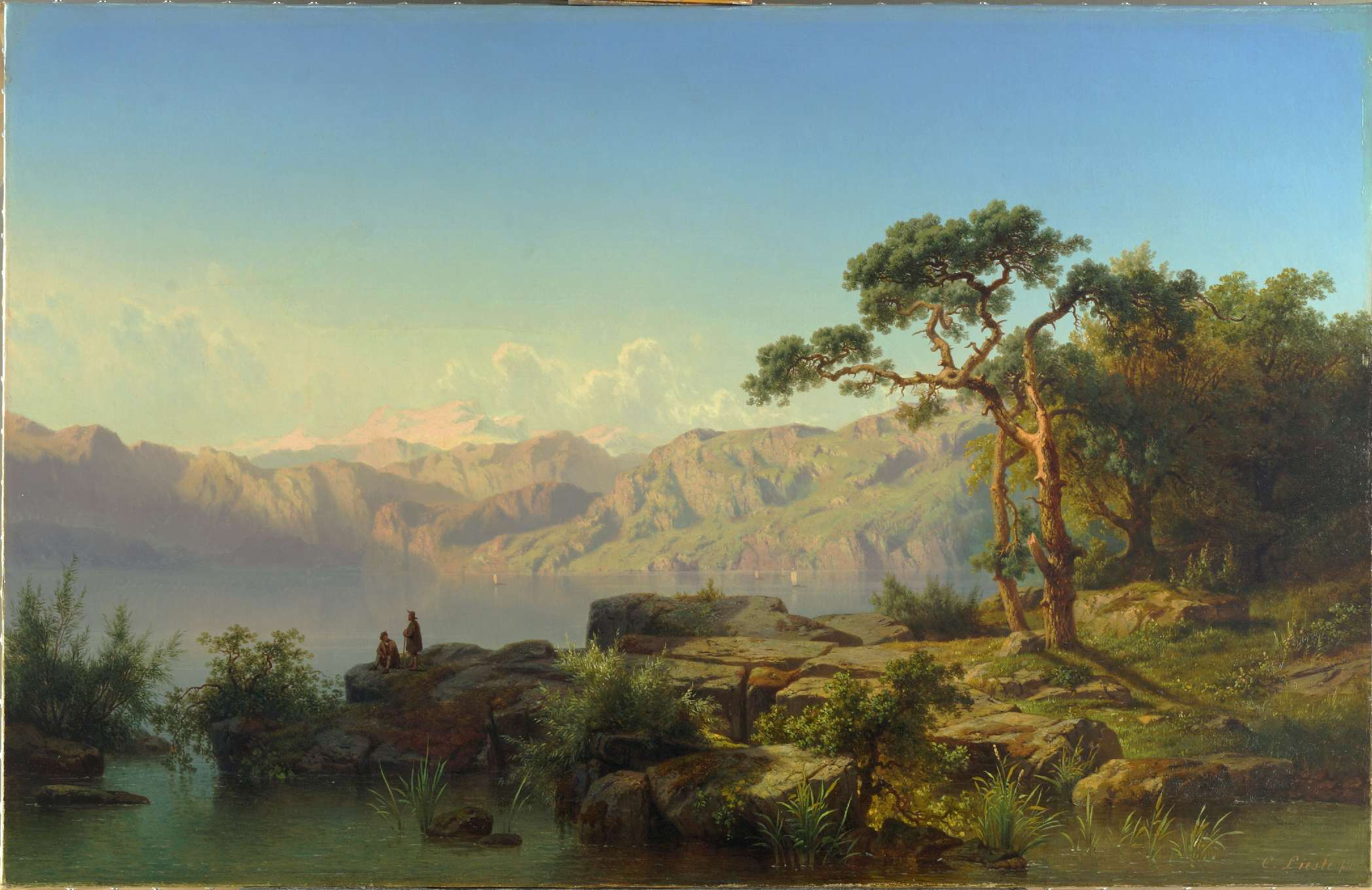
At Lake Como

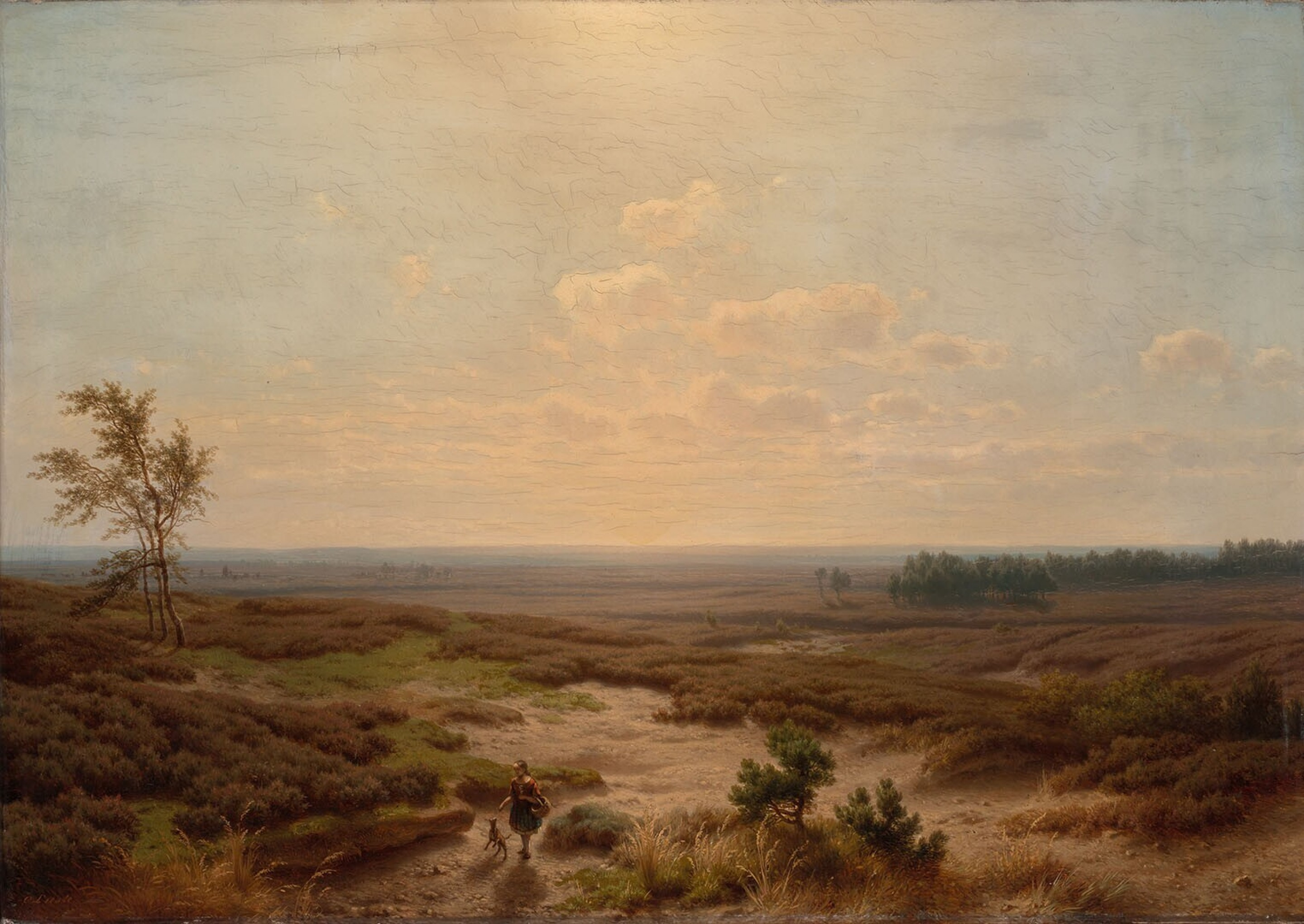
Heathland in Guelders

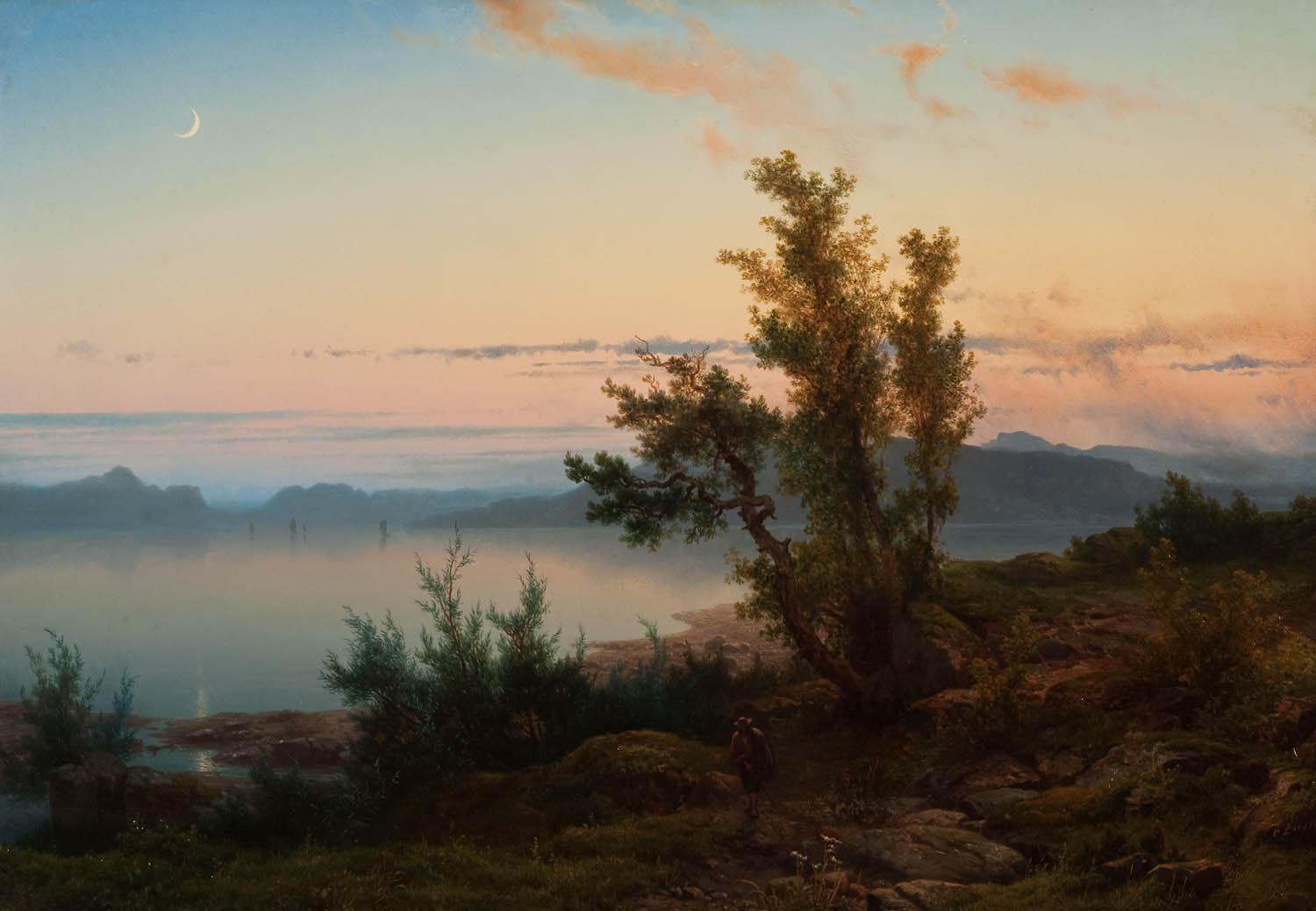
Landscape with Crescent Moon

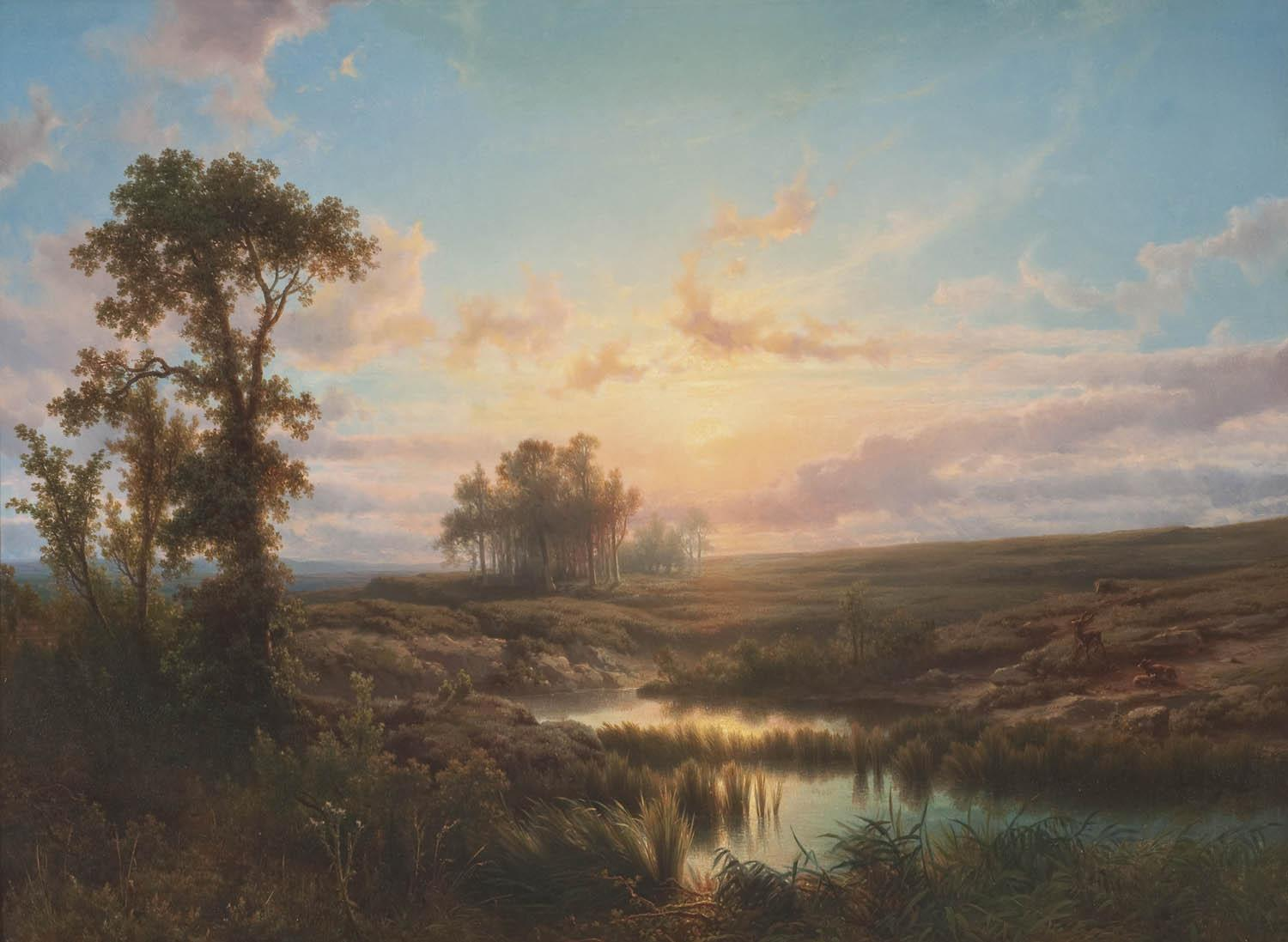
Sunlit Landscape

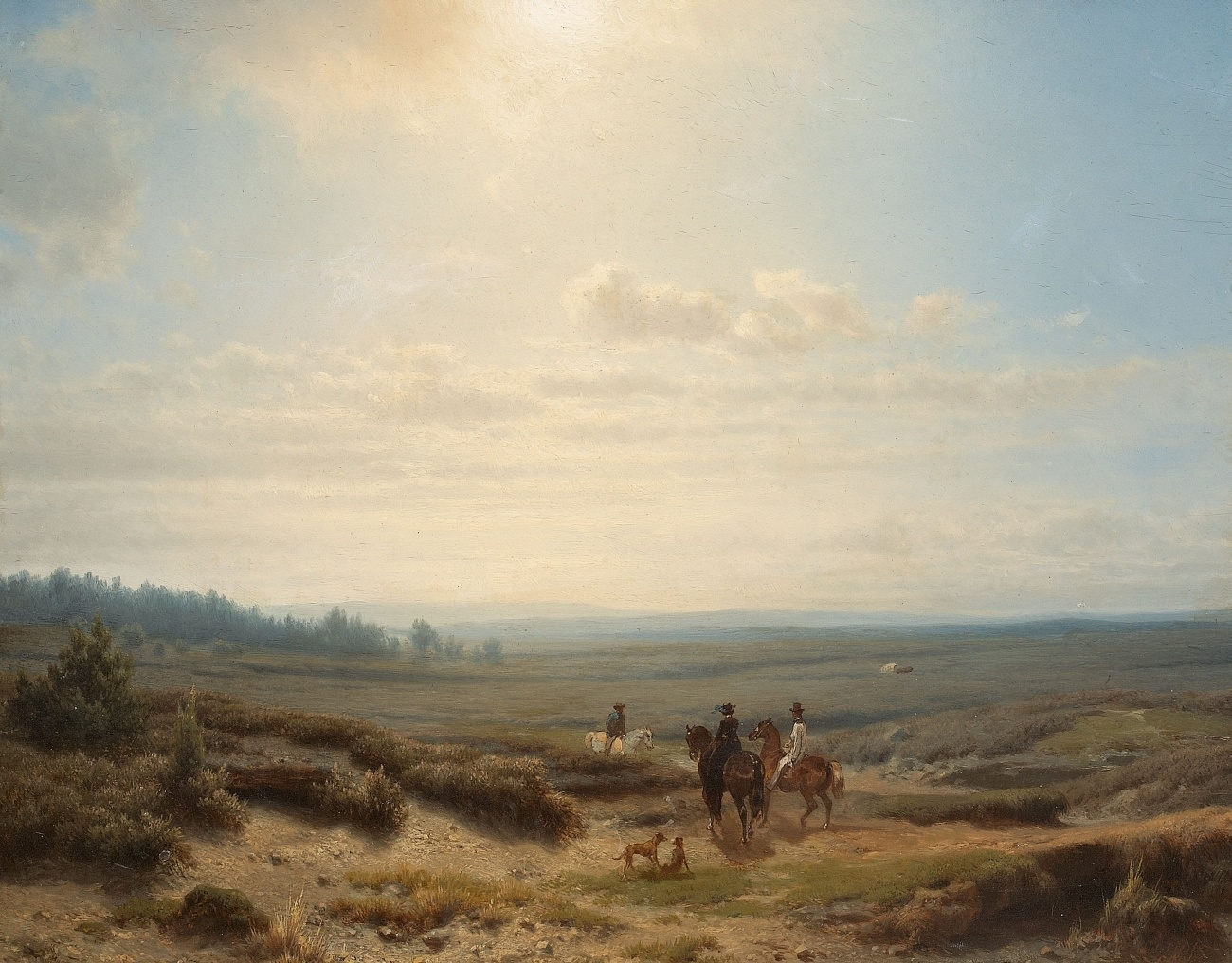
Riders in a Wide Landscape

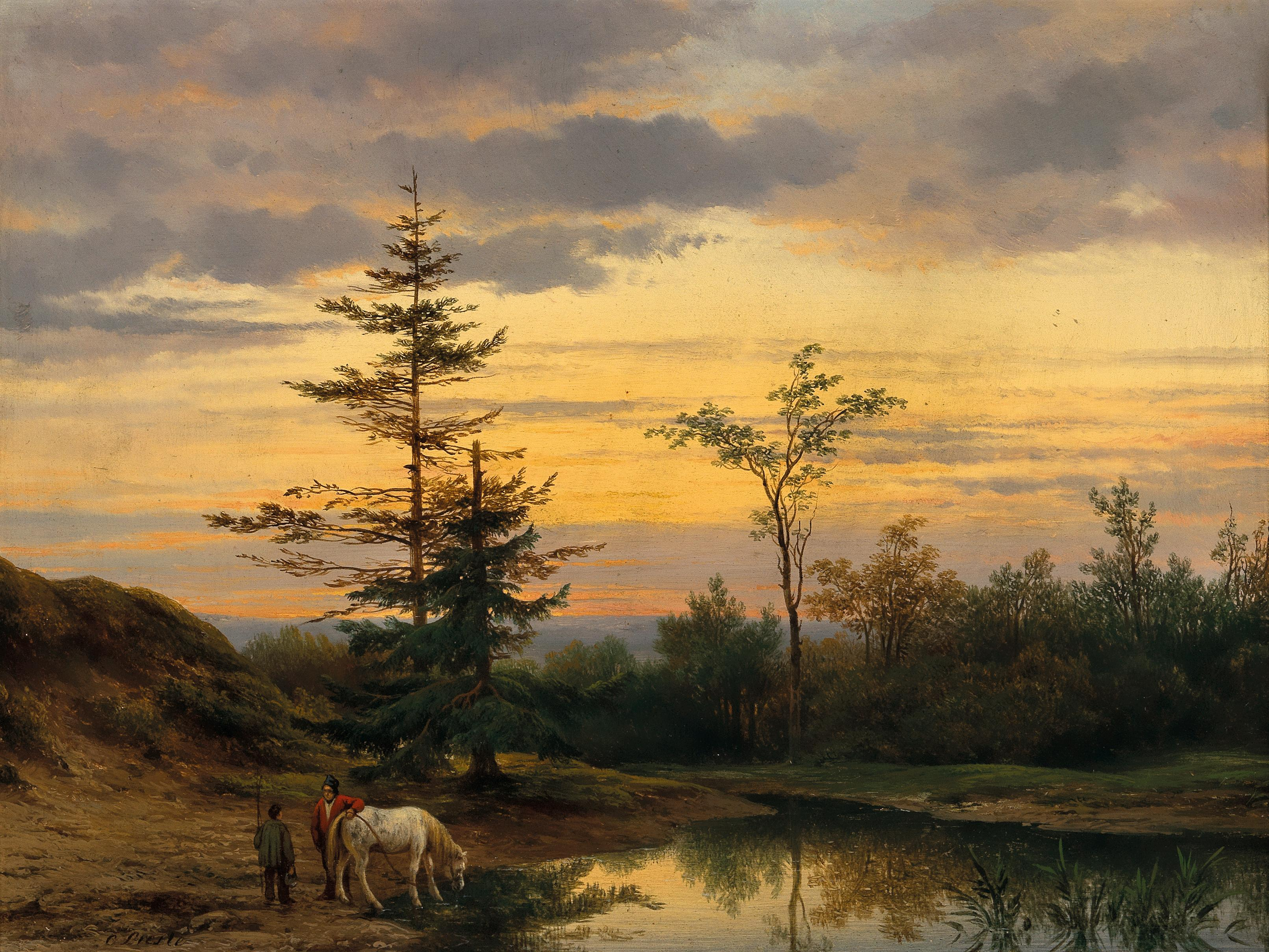
Summer Evening on the River Bank

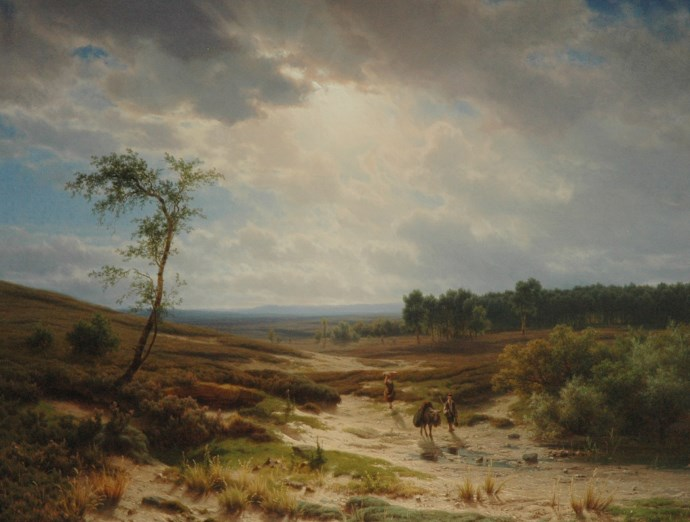
Heathland Landscape near Oosterbeek

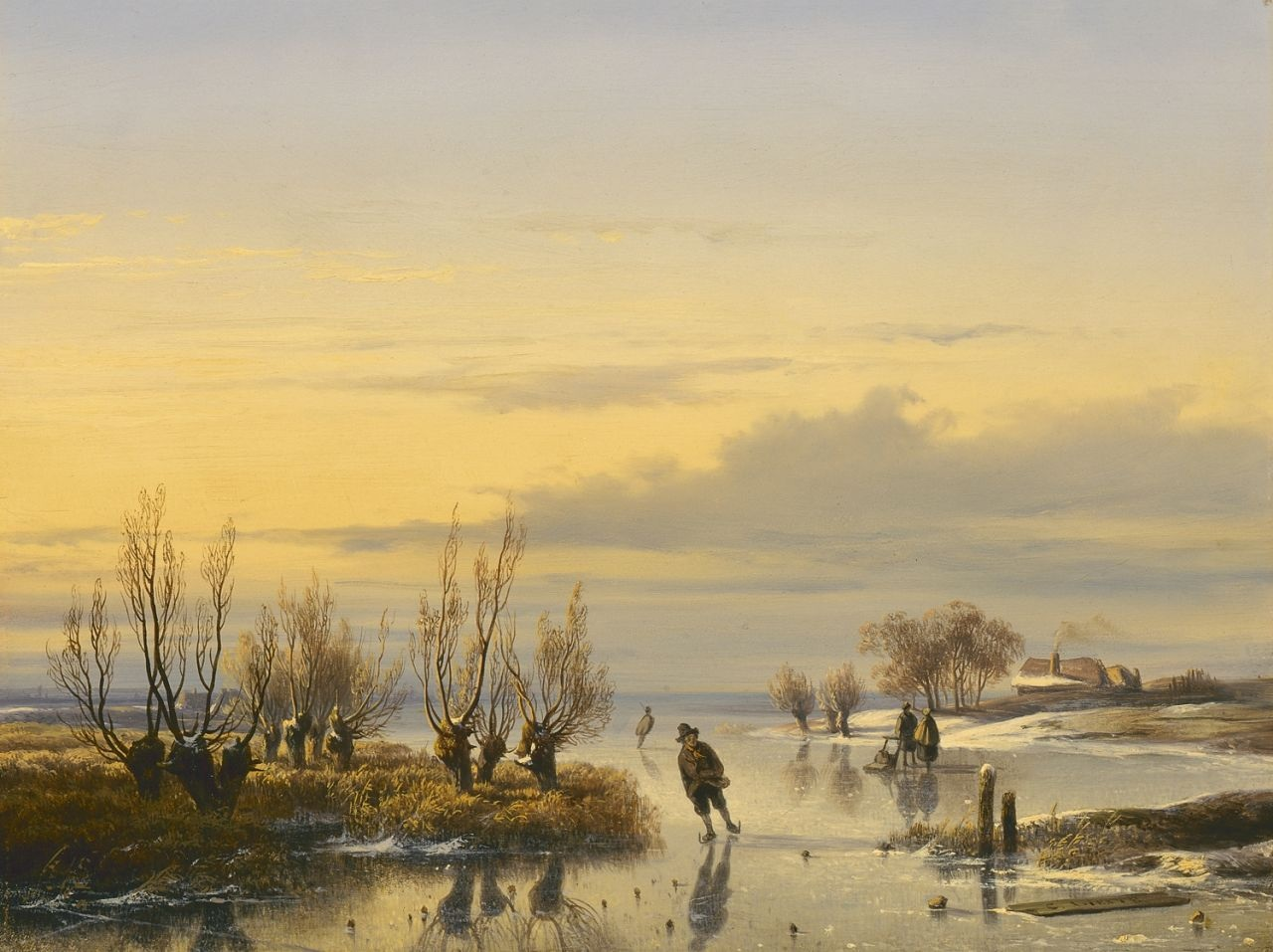
Ice Skating at Sunset

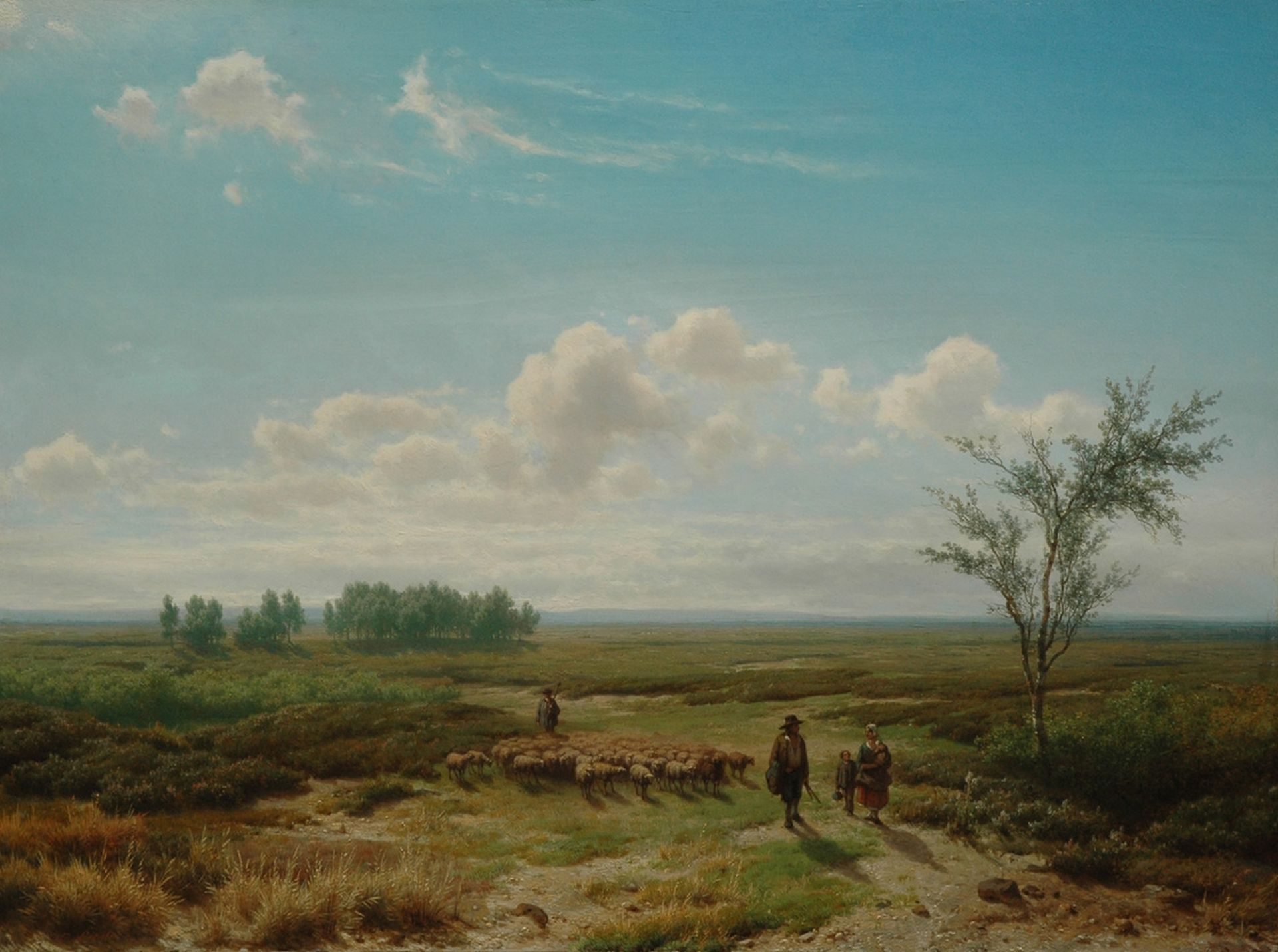
Wide Heathland Landscape

== Sources ==
- Benno Tempel, Ronald de Leeuw: Het Romantiek Boek. Waanders Uitgevers, Zwolle, 2006. ISBN 90-400-8942-6
- De romantische ziel. Catalogue, Teylers Museum, 2014, (biography by Frouckje van Hijum). ISBN 978-94-6208-126-0
- Cornelis Lieste (1817-1861) - Schilder van het licht. Catalogue, Erno Kiljan, Antoon Erftemeijer. Kleve, B.C. Koekkoek Haus, 2016. ISBN 978-3-934-935-77-8
