= Geesje Mesdag-van Calcar =

Dutch painter

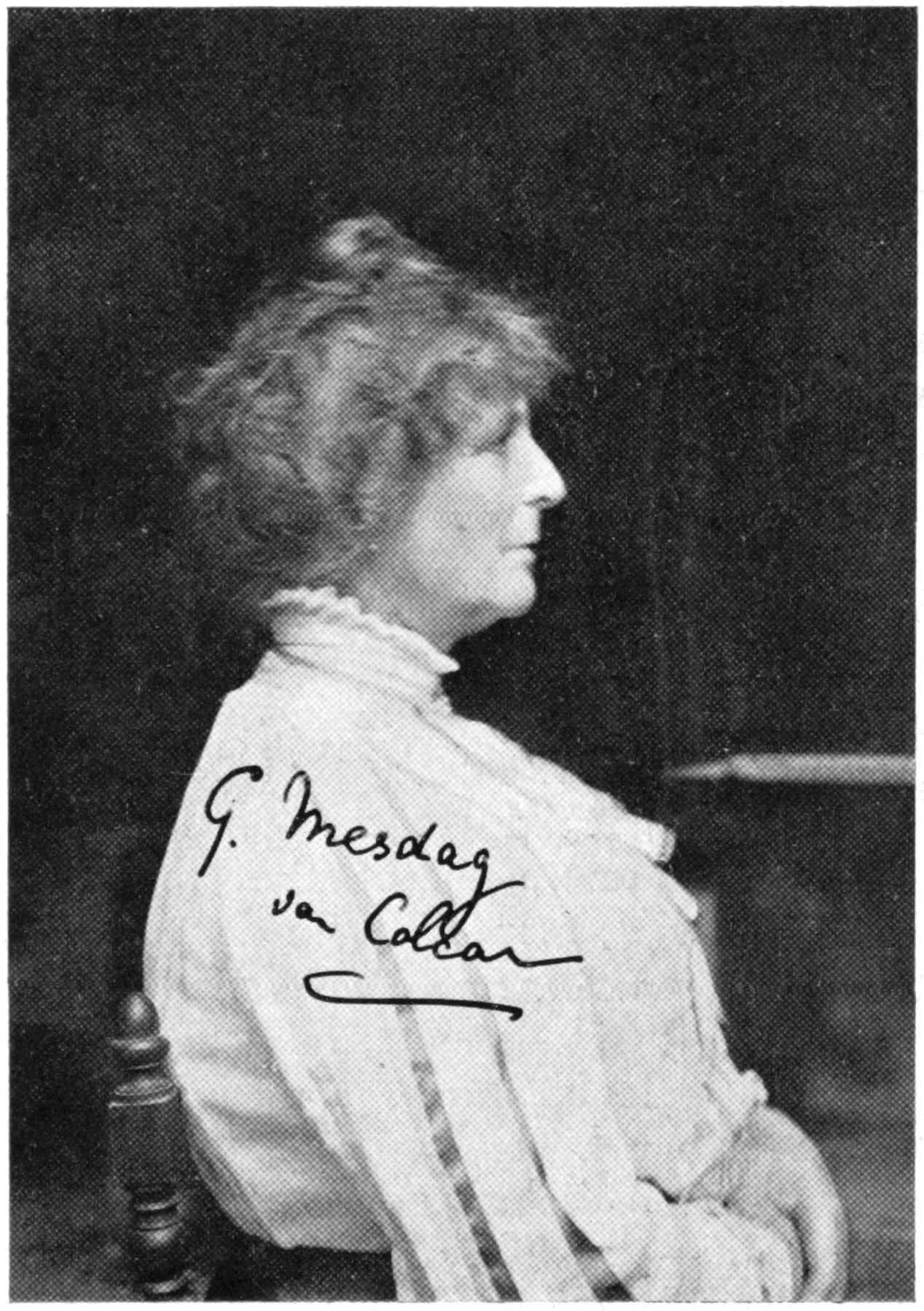
- G. Mesdag-van Calcar, 1927
- Born: 2 July 1850; Hoogezand, Netherlands
- Died: 12 April 1936 (aged 85); The Hague, Netherlands
- Known for: Painting
- Movement: The Hague School
- Spouse: Taco Mesdag

Geesje Mesdag-van Calcar (1850–1936) was a Dutch painter. She is known for her landscape, flower, and genre paintings.

== Biography ==
Mesdag-van Calcar was born 2 July 1850 in Hoogezand. She attended the Academie Minerva in Groningen She also studied with Paul Gabriël in Paris.

She married fellow painter Taco Mesdag (1829–1902) and the couple settled in The Hague. Both were members of the Pulchri Studio and also associated with the Hague School. They also owned property in Vries, Drenthe where they painted in the summer.

Mesdag-van Calcar exhibited her work at the Palace of Fine Arts at the 1893 World's Columbian Exposition in Chicago, Illinois. She received an honorable mention at the Paris Exposition Universelle of 1889.

After her husband's death in 1902, Mesdag-van Calcar moved to Kortenhoef, where she built a studio. Her work from that time was in an Impressionistic style.

Hugenholtz died 4 April 1934 in The Hague.

== Gallery ==
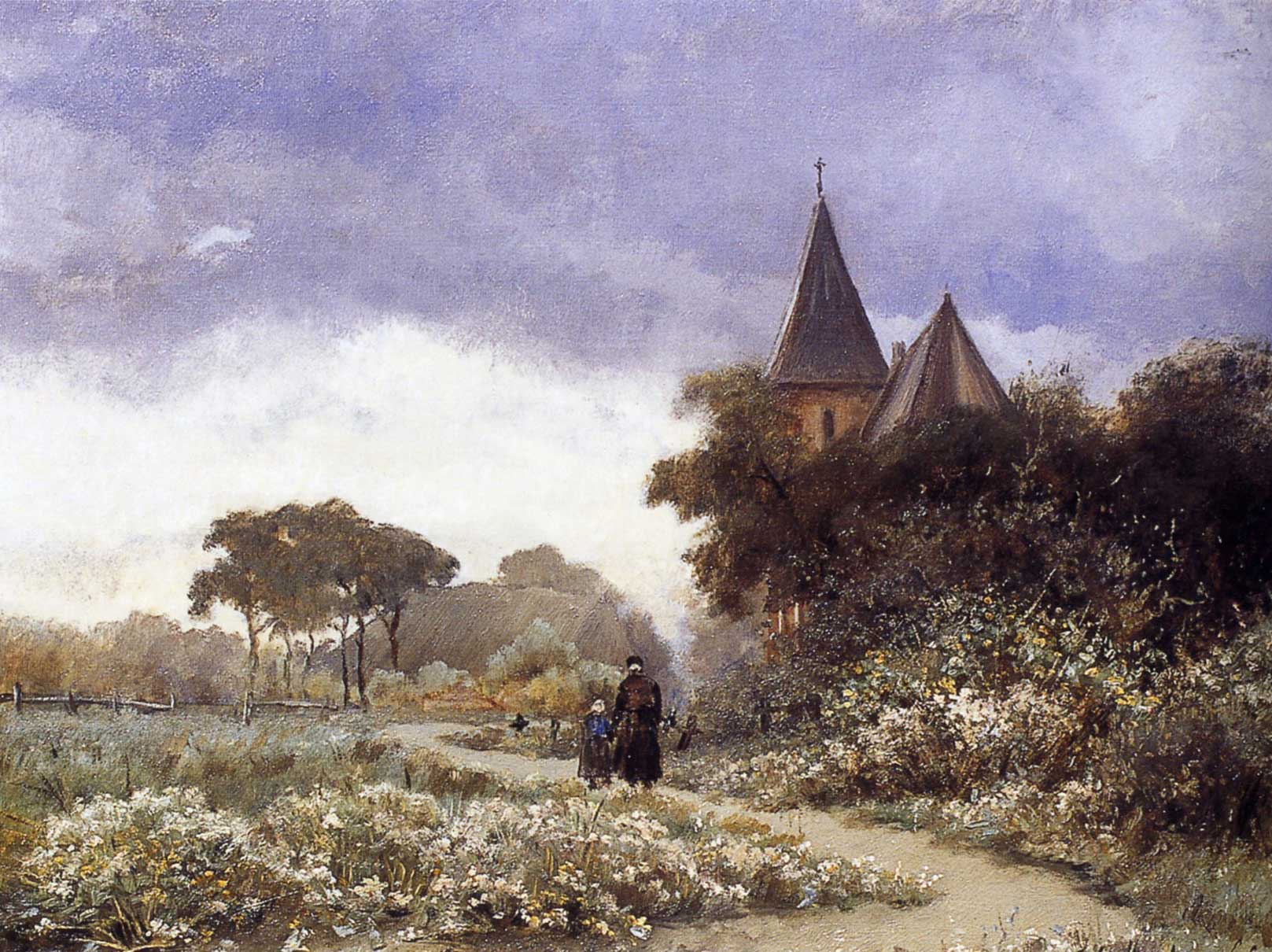
View of Vries with Bonifatius Church
