= Bernard van Beek =

Dutch painter (1875–1941)

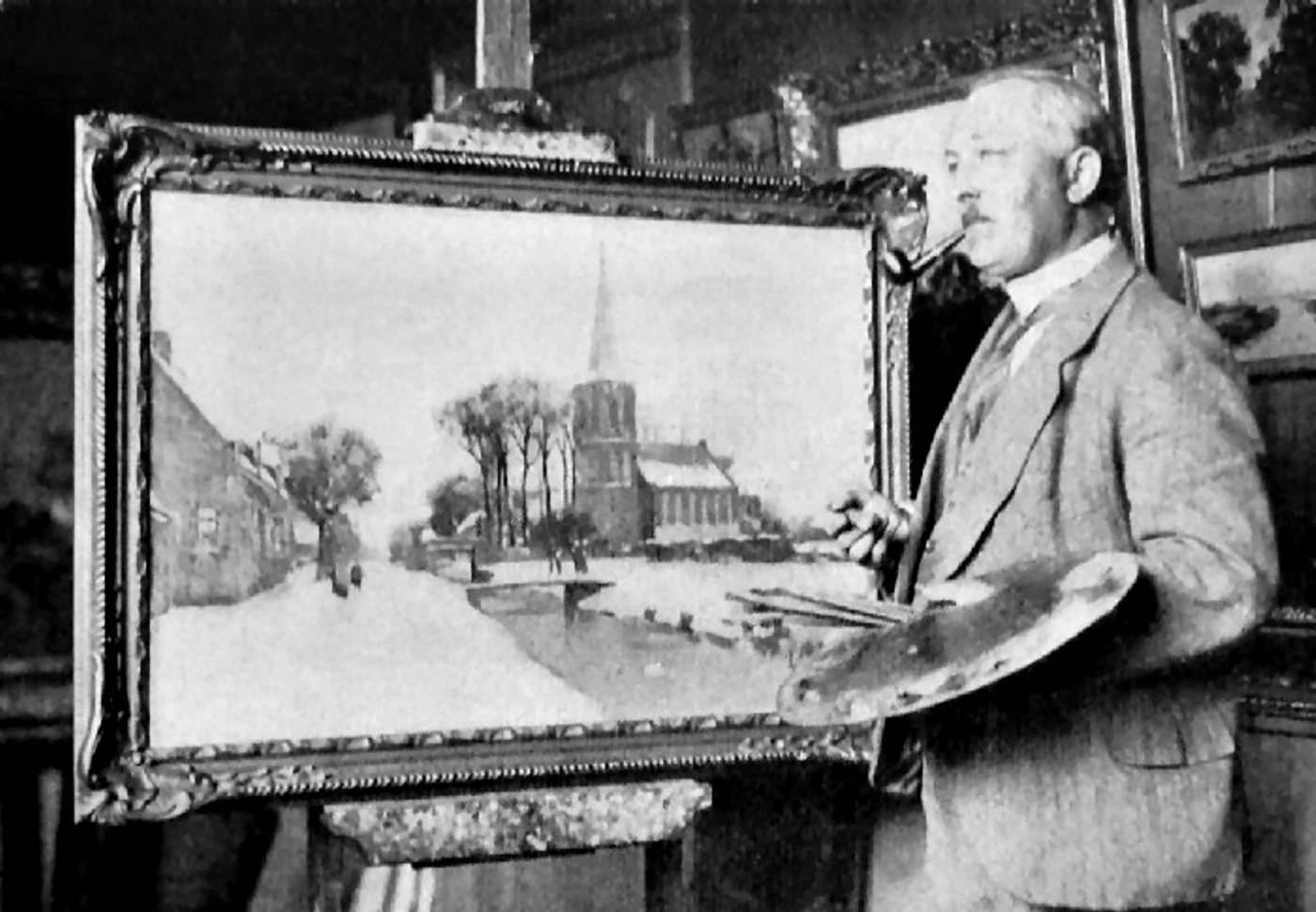
- Bernard van Beek at his easel, circa 1915
- Born: 30 January 1875; Amsterdam, Netherlands
- Died: 3 March 1941 (aged 66); Kortenhoef, North Holland, Netherlands
- Known for: Landscape painting Amateur photography
- Movement: Kortenhoef School; Hague School; Barbizon School

Bernardus Antonie van Beek (30 January 1875, in Amsterdam – 3 March 1941, in Kortenhoef) was a Dutch landscape painter. He never attended an academy. He was part of the Kortenhoef School, a sub-movement of the Hague School and is thus in the tradition of Barbizon School. From his choice of motifs, there are also influences of the Amsterdam Impressionism. His work was part of the painting event in the art competition at the 1928 Summer Olympics.

== Life and work ==
He initially worked with his father as a decorative painter. Subsequently, he attended the School of Arts and Crafts. Then he continued his education, especially in the panel painting.

Van Beek was active in various places in northern Holland. At first he was in Katwijk aan Zee until 1907, then he had a studio in Amsterdam. From 1911, he went to Kortenhoef (Wijdemeren), where he remained until 1931. Finally, his wandering ended in Vreeland (Stichtse Vecht), where he worked as a painter until his death in the year 1941 at the age of 66 years.

In Kortenhoef, he met Paul Gabriël, who had the major influence on his early work. He brought him up to new issues such as the water lily landscapes in the polder area and the issue of peat.

There he met Evert Pieters and Jan Hillebrand Wijsmuller. These teachers of the Hague School had a significant influence on his painting style and the perfection of his training.

On his palette, he chose consciously always those mediums which produced a strong surface light. This followed the tradition of the Hague School 2nd generation. Even the winter face has not the usual darkness. Its luminosity is expressed with selected colours quality combined with the wet into wet technique with loose, fluid brushwork. This is a result of the surface of the canvas and the pigments with its binder. In the paintings of the city face he orientated almost towards to Jan Vermeer (1632–1675), like "The street of Delft" and Gerrit Adriaensz. Berckheyde (1638–1698), like "Place at the St. Bravo Church in Haarlem". His chosen colors are a sensitive modification of the Hague School 2nd generation. Especially the selected, graded shade of blue as a message of the trapped atmosphere is a characteristic of him. The screen layout is corresponding to the former kind of the old Dutch landscape painting - he rises from bottom left to top right. The horizon of his Pictures moves from the lower third, over the middle to upper third.

== Paintings ==
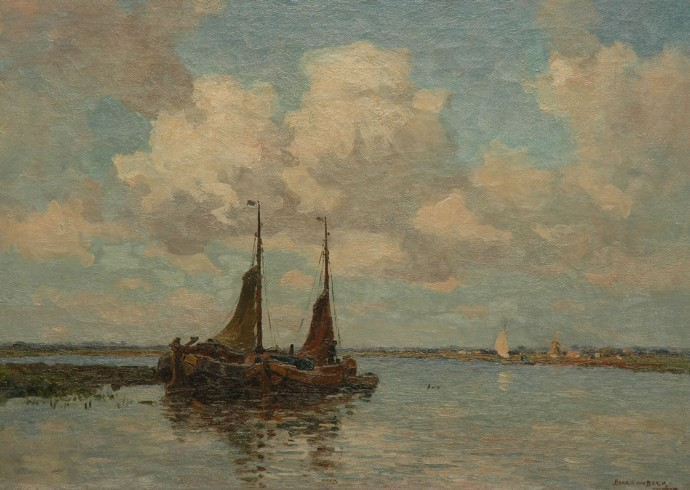
Return of the fishing boats to Kortenhoef (nearly 1910).

His chosen genres ranged from genre landscape painting with scenes of summer landscape, polders and the village face to the city face. In still life, he had primarily adopted the flower as an object. He also chooses the classic theme of the windmill of Jan Hendrik Weissenbruch (1824–1903) and Paul Gabriel (1828–1903)—both are in the tradition of Jacob van Ruisdael (1630–1681). Very well known are the landscape paintings from the surrounding of Kortenhoef. He is primarily concerned with inland fishing themes, too.

He also immortalized the old quarter of the township and followed the Amsterdam Impressionism, but he didn't follow their black period. In the 1920s, he discovered the bright, light village face. In the color palette, he follows Jan Vermeer and Gerrit Adriaensz. Berckheyde.

He belonged to the Kortenhoef School and the Hague School. He has been an amateur photographer, too.

He became a member of Arti et Amicitiae.

Van Beek died in 1941 at the age of 66 years.

== Expositions ==
- 1903 Stedelijke internationale tentoonstelling van kunstwerken van levende meesters, Stedelijk Museum, Amsterdam.
- 1907 Stedelijke internationale tentoonstelling van kunstwerken van levende meesters, Stedelijk Museum, Amsterdam.
- 1912 Stedelijke internationale tentoonstelling van kunstwerken van levende meesters, Stedelijk Museum, Amsterdam.

== Selected bibliography ==
=== Books ===
- Carole Denninger-Schreuder: De onvergankelijke kijk op Kortenhoef : een schilderdorp in beeld, uitgeverij Thoth Bussum, 1998, ISBN 90-6868-215-6, page 78 - 82.

== Gallery ==
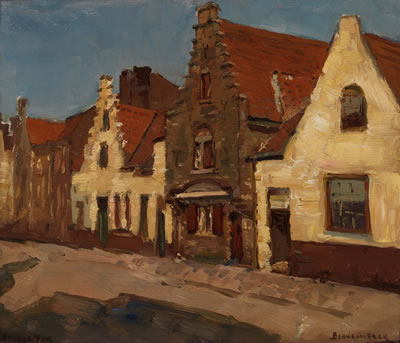
Street in Bruges (about 1910).

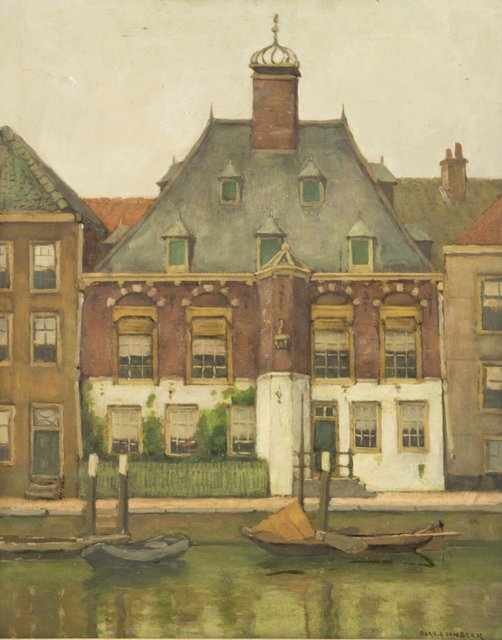
House in the town (about 1920).

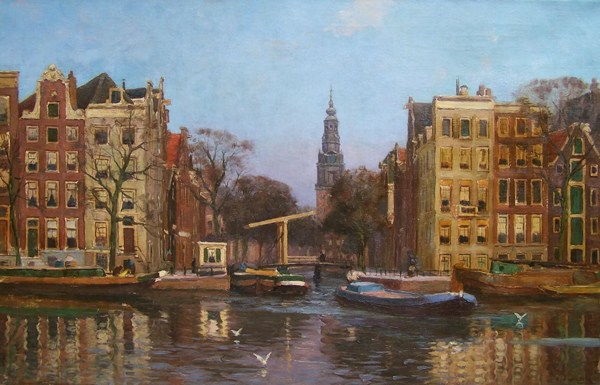
Voorburgwal (about 1920).

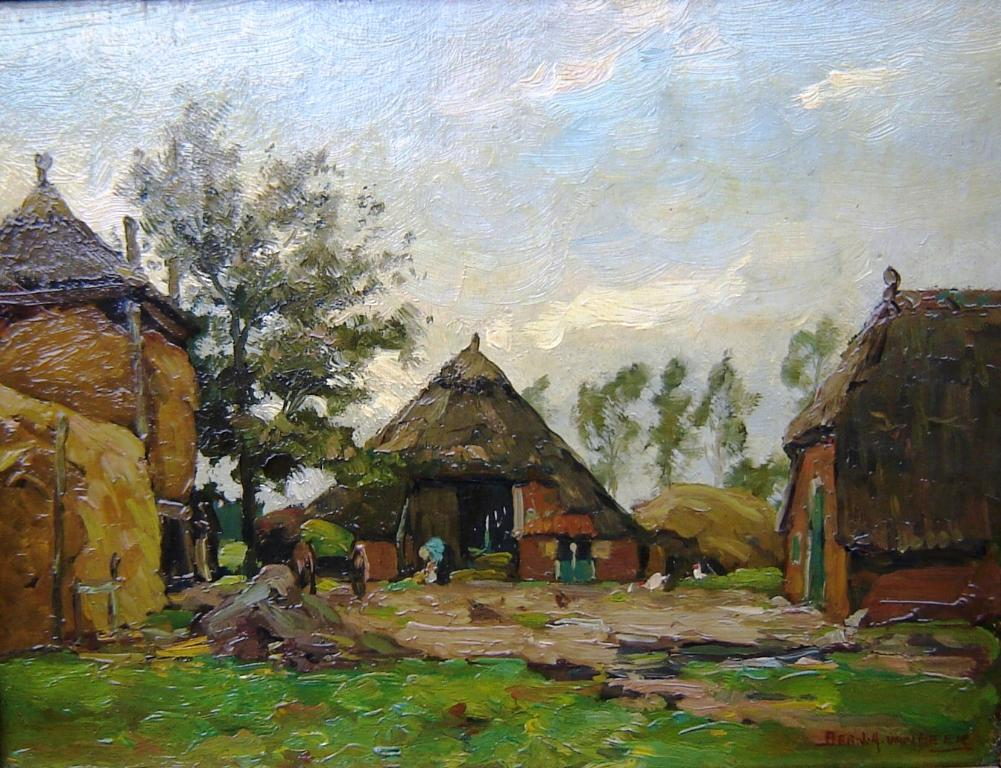
Farmhouse (about 1920).

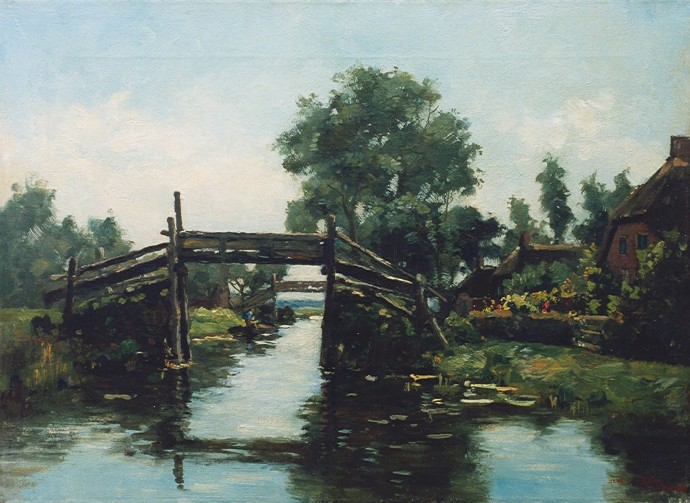
Footbridge near Kortenhoef (about 1910).

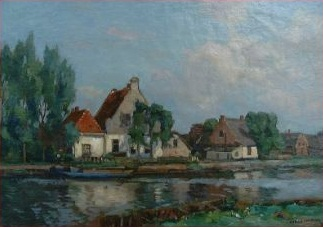
House near water (about 1920).

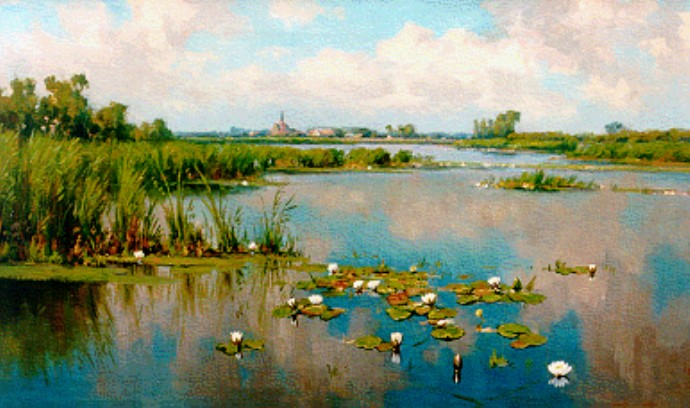
Water lilies near Kortenhoef (about 1920).

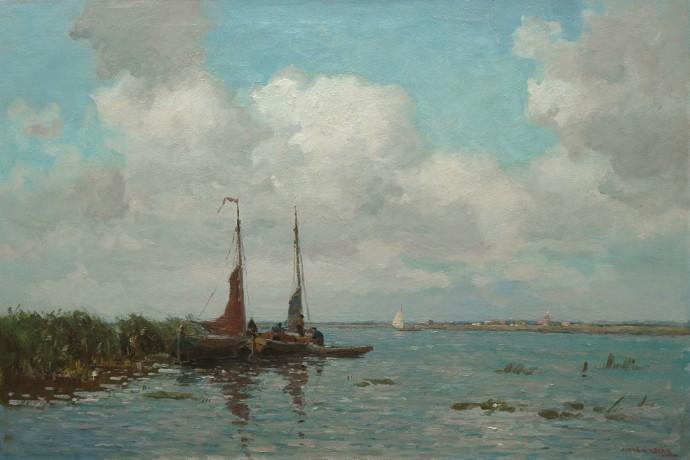
Fishing boats near Kortenhoef (about 1920).
