= Henri Adolphe Schaep =

Belgian painter, draughtsman and military officer

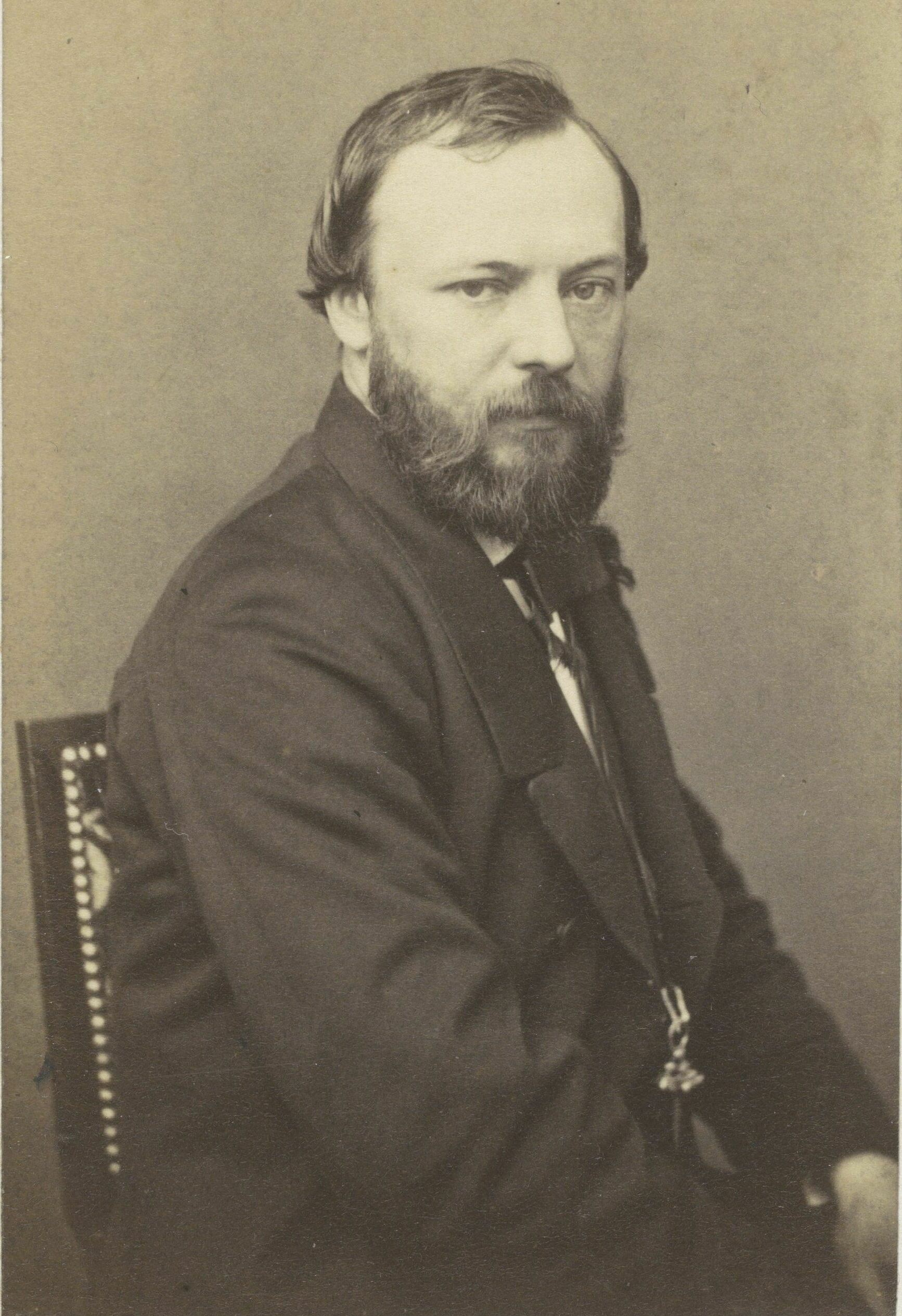
Henri Adolphe Schaep

Henri Adolphe Schaep or Hendrik Adolf Schaep (3 January 1826, in Mechelen – 6 June 1870, in Antwerp) was a Belgian painter, draughtsman. He is best known for his marines but also painted landscapes. Schaep was an important representative of the Romantic-Realist movement in Belgian marine painting.

== Life ==
Henri Adolphe Schaep was born in Mechelen as the son of Franciscus, a baker, and Maria-Theresia Wauters. The family moved to Antwerp in 1828. Henri Adolphe commenced his artistic studies at the Antwerp Academy of Fine Arts in 1838. His studies overlapped with those of Egide Linnig, another future marine painter who had commenced his studies at the academy in 1834.

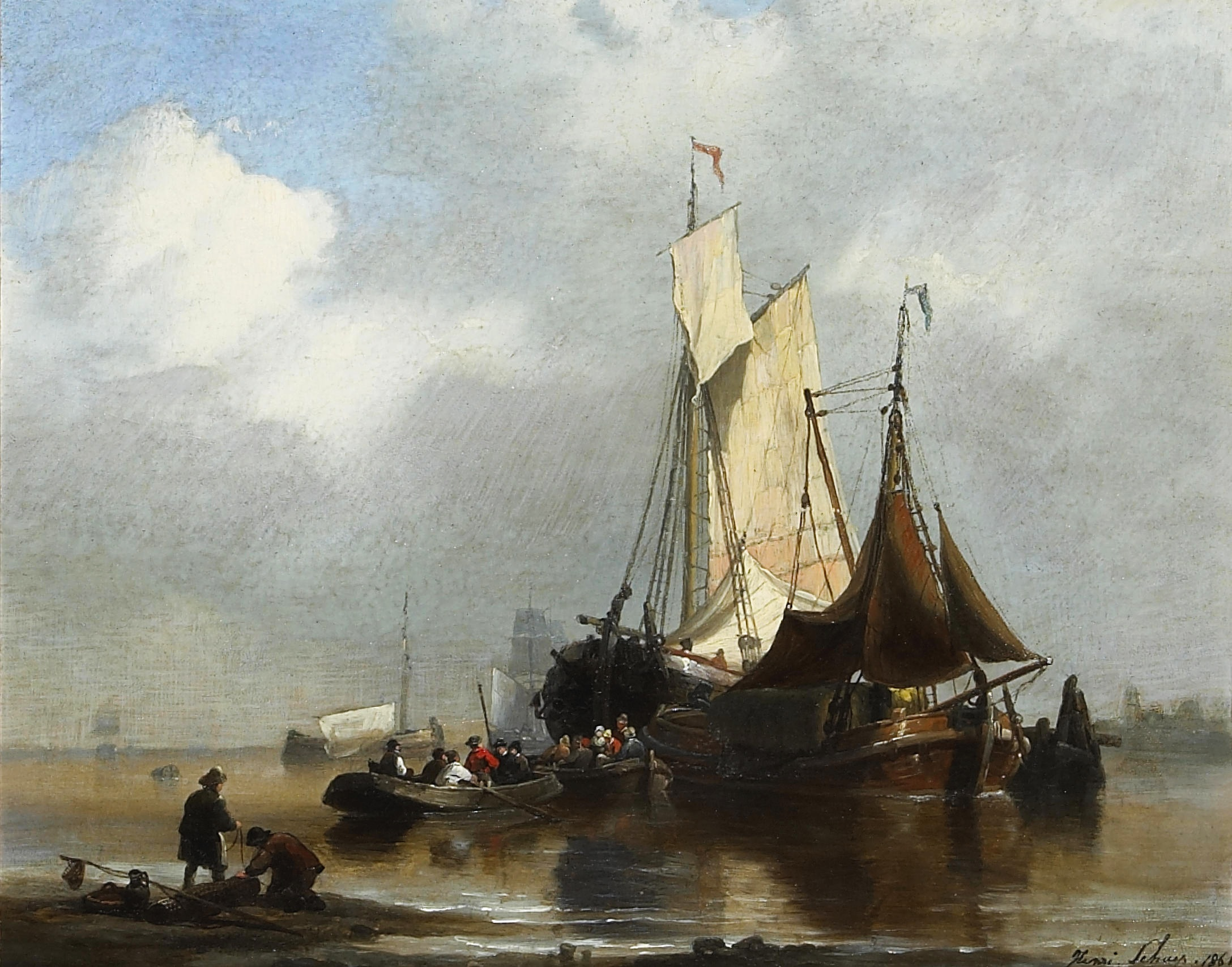
Ships in a port

Schaep did not only study art but simultaneously developed a career as a military officer. This career path brought him to various locations: he was a lieutenant in Ghent in 1840, he was based in Antwerp from 1846 to 1849, in 1849 he was in Ostend, in 1855 he was a captain in Mechelen, in 1857 he was based in Liege, in 1861 he was back in Antwerp and in 1862 in Brussels.

From the 1840s onwards, Schaep started participating in the triennial salons of Brussels, Antwerp, Ghent and the provincial capitals of Belgium. His contribution to the Antwerp Salon of 1843 of the marine painting Marine, soleil couchant was likely his first participation in a salon. He also presented compositions called 'Kermesse flamande' to the Brussels Salon in 1851 and compositions called 'marines' in the Antwerp Salon in 1849.

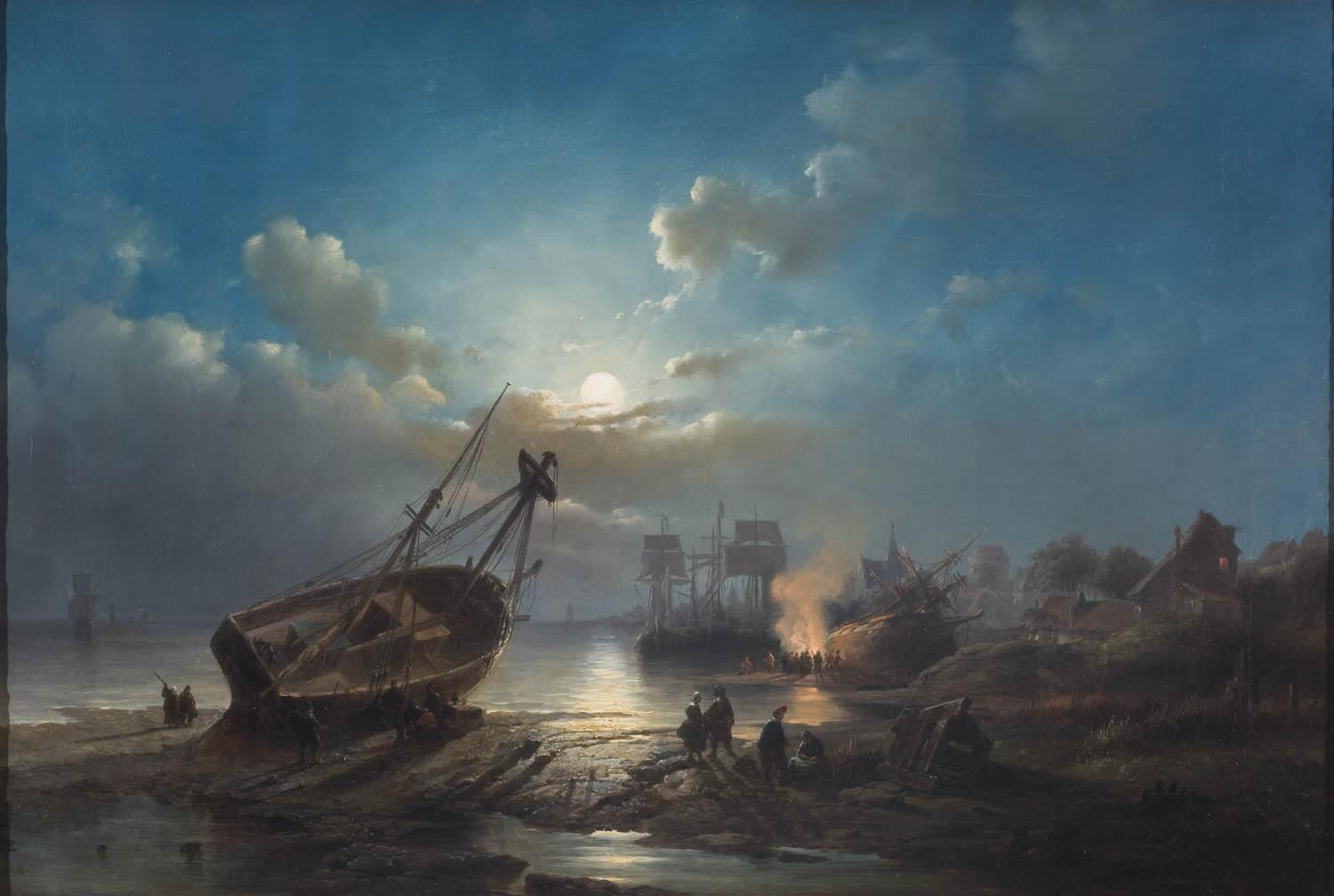
Working in the docks at night

Schaep was active as a part-time painter. He was also recognised as a geologist and paleontologist.

Schaep died in Brussels on 6 June 1870.

== Work ==
Henri Adolphe Schaep was mainly a painter of marines although he also painted landscapes. The Scheldt in Antwerp up to its estuary was one of his main sources of inspiration although he painted some scenes of the Thames. He is reported to have painted some kermesse scenes. He also collaborated with the Dutch landscape painter Nicolaas Johannes Roosenboom.

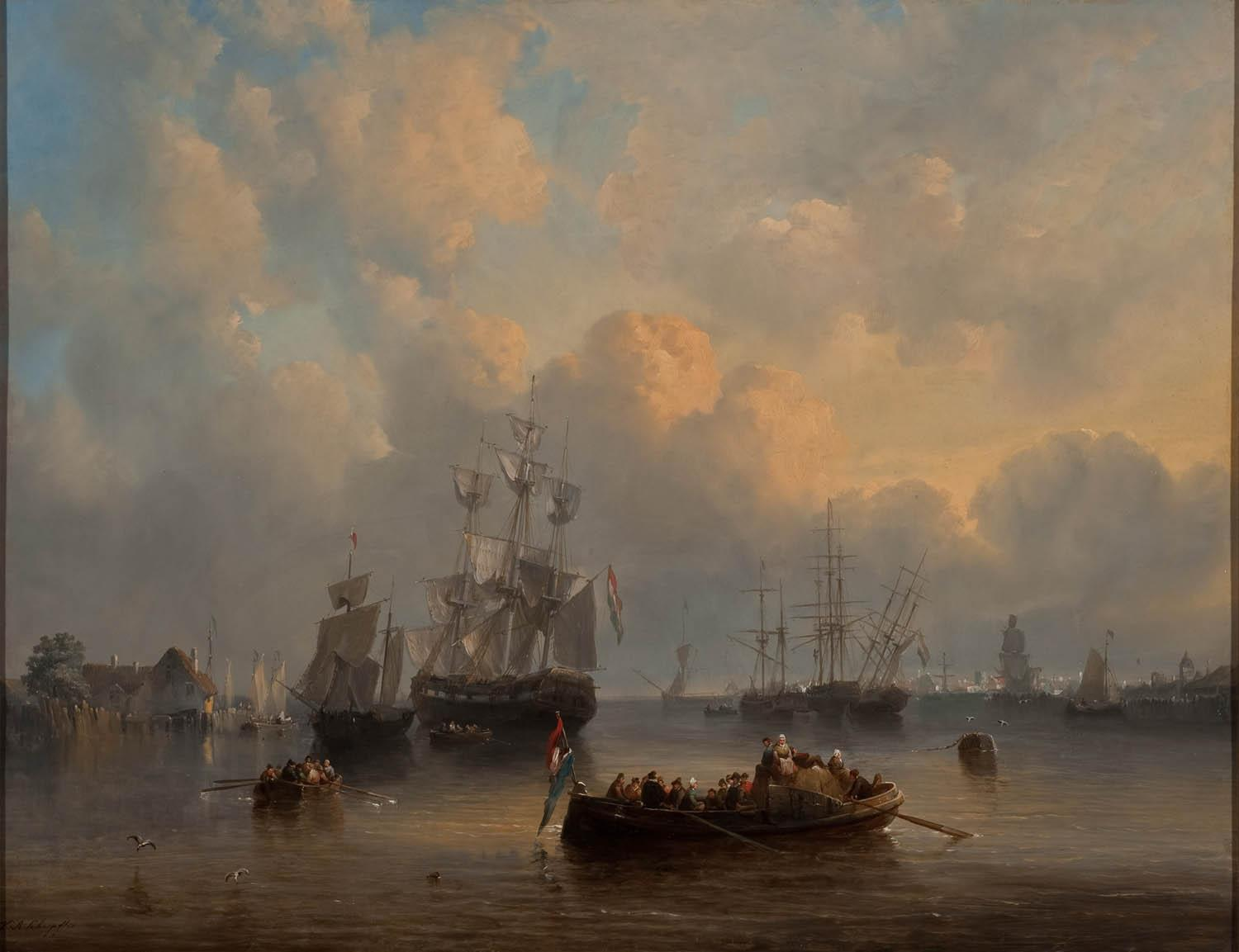
View of a port

Schaep was an important representative of the Romantic-Realist movement in Belgian marine painting. This movement saw its heyday between 1830 and 1860. Its representatives included Egide Linnig, Henri Lehon, François Musin and Paul Jean Clays. Schaep is a typical representative of this movement in the choice of his subject matter, which covers the usual romantic scenes such as storms, high seas and shipwrecks. He often painted the 'extreme moments' of the day: sunrise and sunset, the start and end of the day, when the color contrasts are the most intense and the colors are striking.

A good example of Schaep's Romantic approach can be seen in A shipwreck (1857, Royal Museum of Fine Arts Antwerp). The composition is perhaps one of the most impressive paintings in his oeuvre as it displays his high level of technical skill in the rendering of the stormy sea. The whole canvas is filled with the rough sea, the sky, the shipwrecked ship and the lifeboat without any other compositional props.
