= Nicolaas Johannes Roosenboom =

Dutch landscape artist

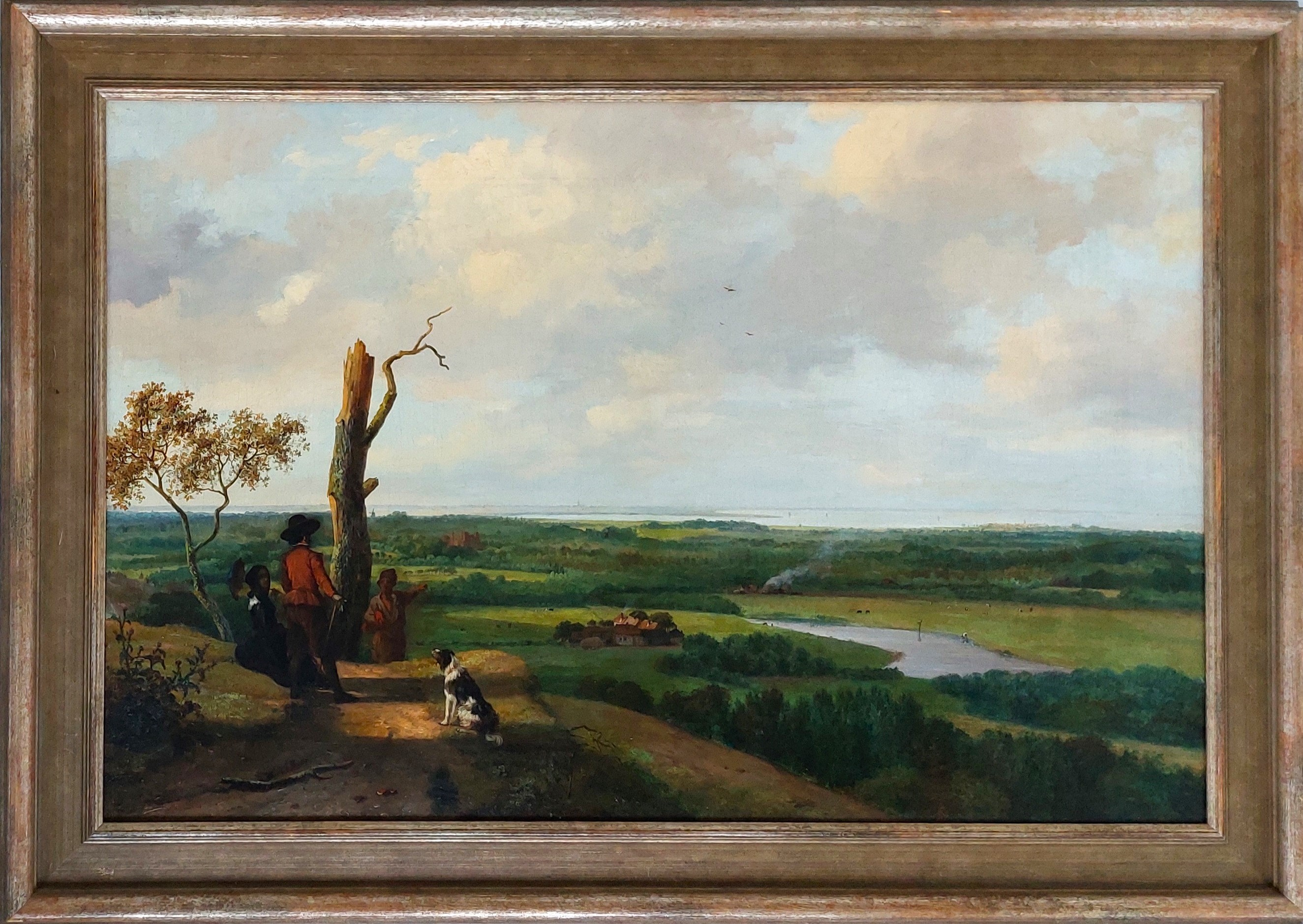
A panoramic landscape, with Ernest Slingeneyer

Nicolaas Johannes Roosenboom (23 August 1805 – 1 March 1880), was a Dutch painter, etcher, lithographer, watercolorist, and illustrator who was specialised in landscape art. He painted various types of landscapes but was mainly known for his winter landscapes. Roosenboom's work is situated in the Dutch Romantic movement. He collaborated with various artists who painted the staffage in his landscapes.

== Life ==
Roosenboom was born in Schellingwoude now in Amsterdam. He studied painting with Andreas Schelfhout, a leading Romantic landscape painter.

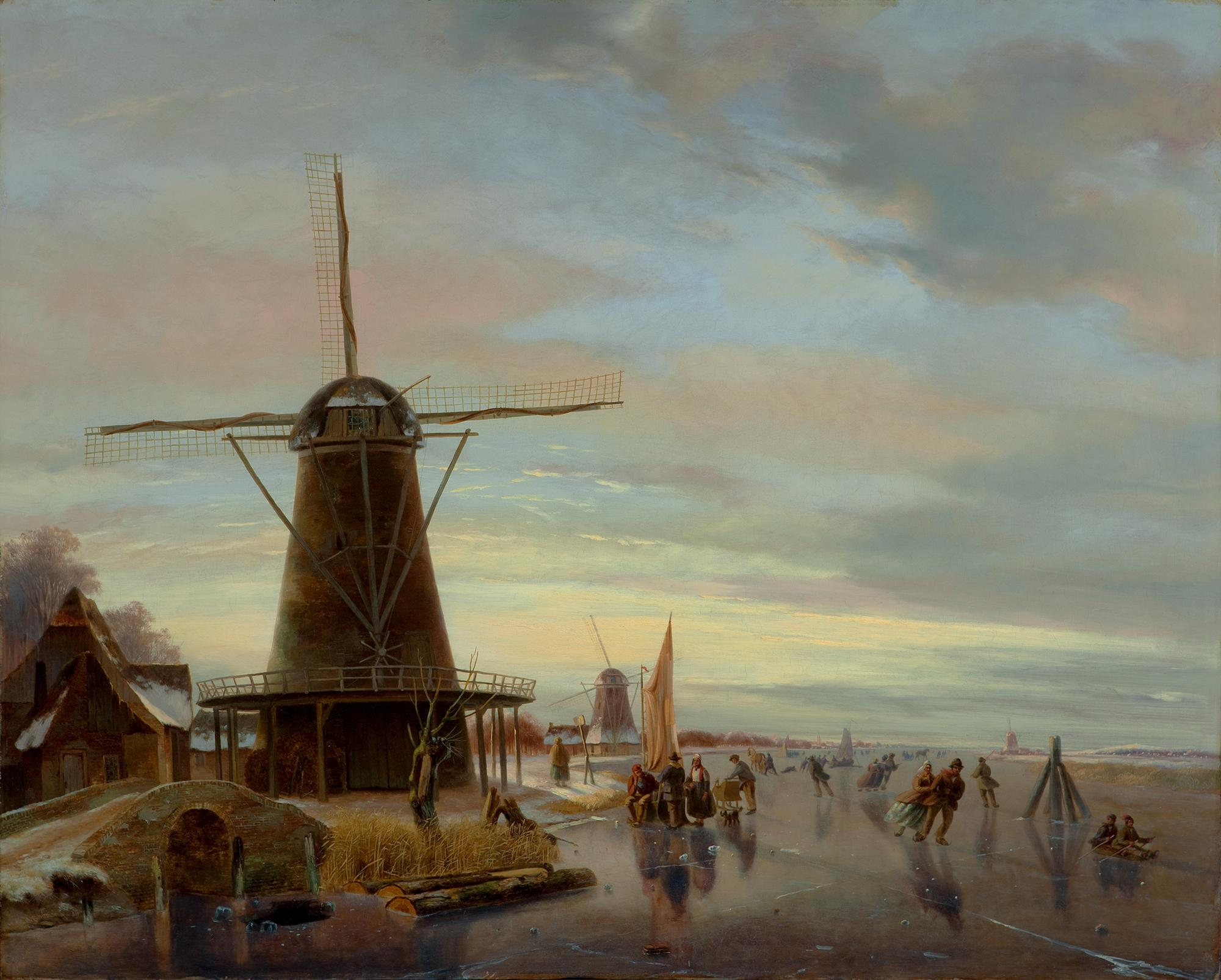
Skaters on a frozen waterway

He married the daughter of his master, Maria Schelfhout. The couple had four children. Their daughter Margaretha Roosenboom was a pupil of her father and grandfather and became an important flower painter.

In 1846 Roosenboom was elected to the board of directors of the Haarlem Drawing College (Teeken-Kollegie), which had as its motto 'Art be our Goal' (Kunst zij ons Doel). Between 1826 and 1876 the artist showed at exhibitions in The Hague and Amsterdam.

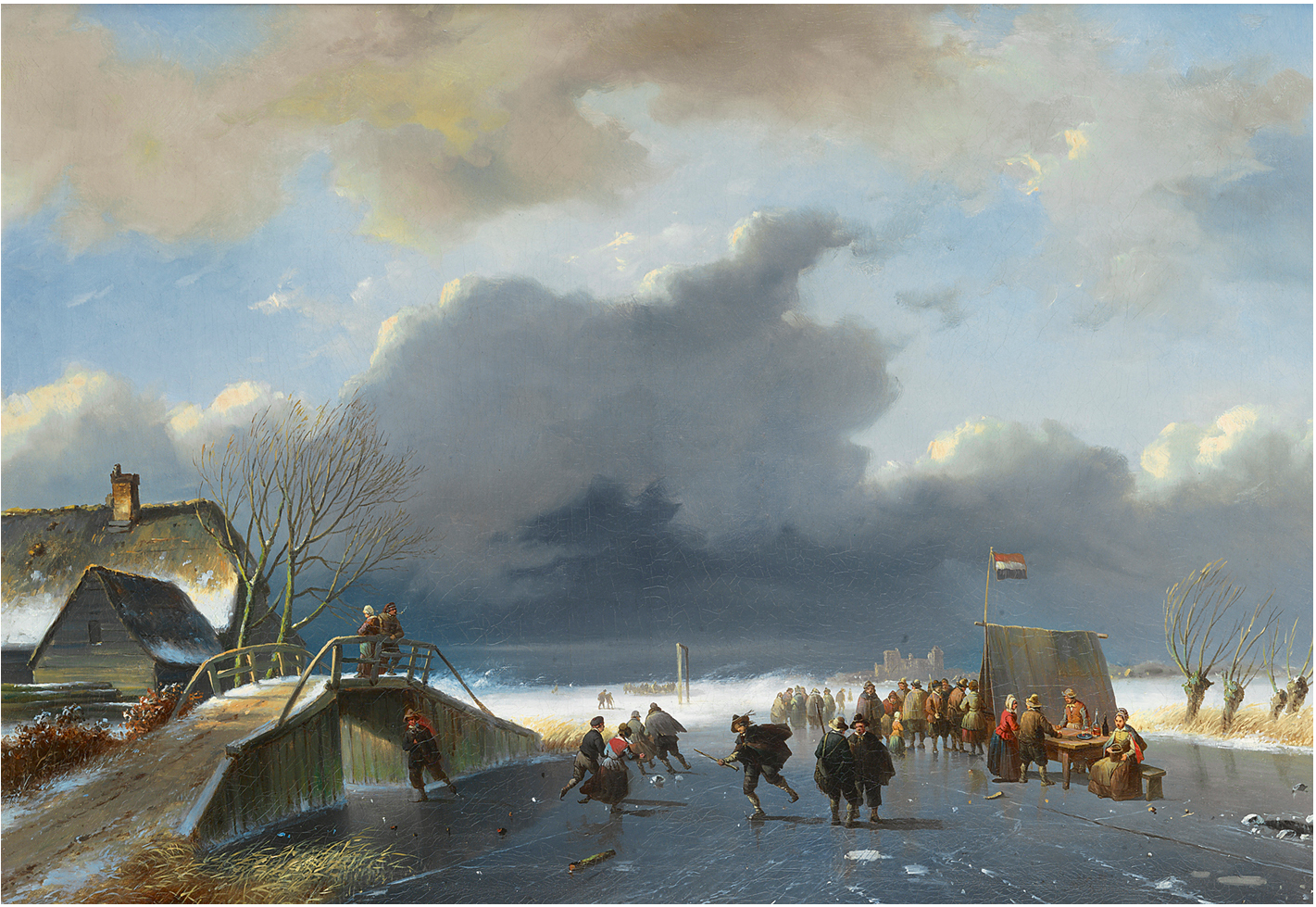
Fun on the ice at a koek-en-zopie, with Henri Adolphe Schaep

Roosenboom became very successful and the good sales of his paintings enabled him to travel a lot. In 1829 he visited Germany and was back in the Netherlands in 1830 working in The Hague. In 1835 he visited Scotland and Devonshire in England. In 1838 he was in Haarlem and in 1843 he was back in The Hague. In 1846 he was in Overveen, in 1847 in Amsterdam, in 1848 in The Hague, in 1852 in Rotterdam, in 1860 in Brussels, in 1862 in Rotterdam, in 1865 in Haarlem, in Westerbork from 1867 to 1869 and 1876–1878, in Kampen in 1872 and finally in Assen in 1878. During this period he moved households more than 15 times. For some time he collaborated with the Belgian animal painter Eugène Joseph Verboeckhoven. He also collaborated with Belgian painters Henri Adolphe Schaep and Ernest Slingeneyer.

In addition to his daughter, his pupils included Fredrik Marinus Kruseman, Cornelis Lieste and Johannes Petrus van Velzen (1816–1853).

== Work ==
Roosenboom was a landscape painter and printmaker. Like his master Schelfhout he painted summer landscapes as well as river and beach scenes. He specialized in and became famous for his winter landscapes.

Schelfhout and Roosenboom's work is situated in the Dutch Romantic movement, which was a reaction to the decline in popularity of Dutch landscape painting. The international Romantic movement, which had swept across Europe, arrived late in The Netherlands. Landscape painting took central stage in Dutch Romanticism and was based mainly on a revaluation of Dutch 17th century landscapes. Started at the end of the 18th century the movement dominated Dutch painting for about 70 years. One of the key figures of this group was Andreas Schelfhout, whom contemporary art critics dubbed "the Claude Lorrain of the Winter Scene".

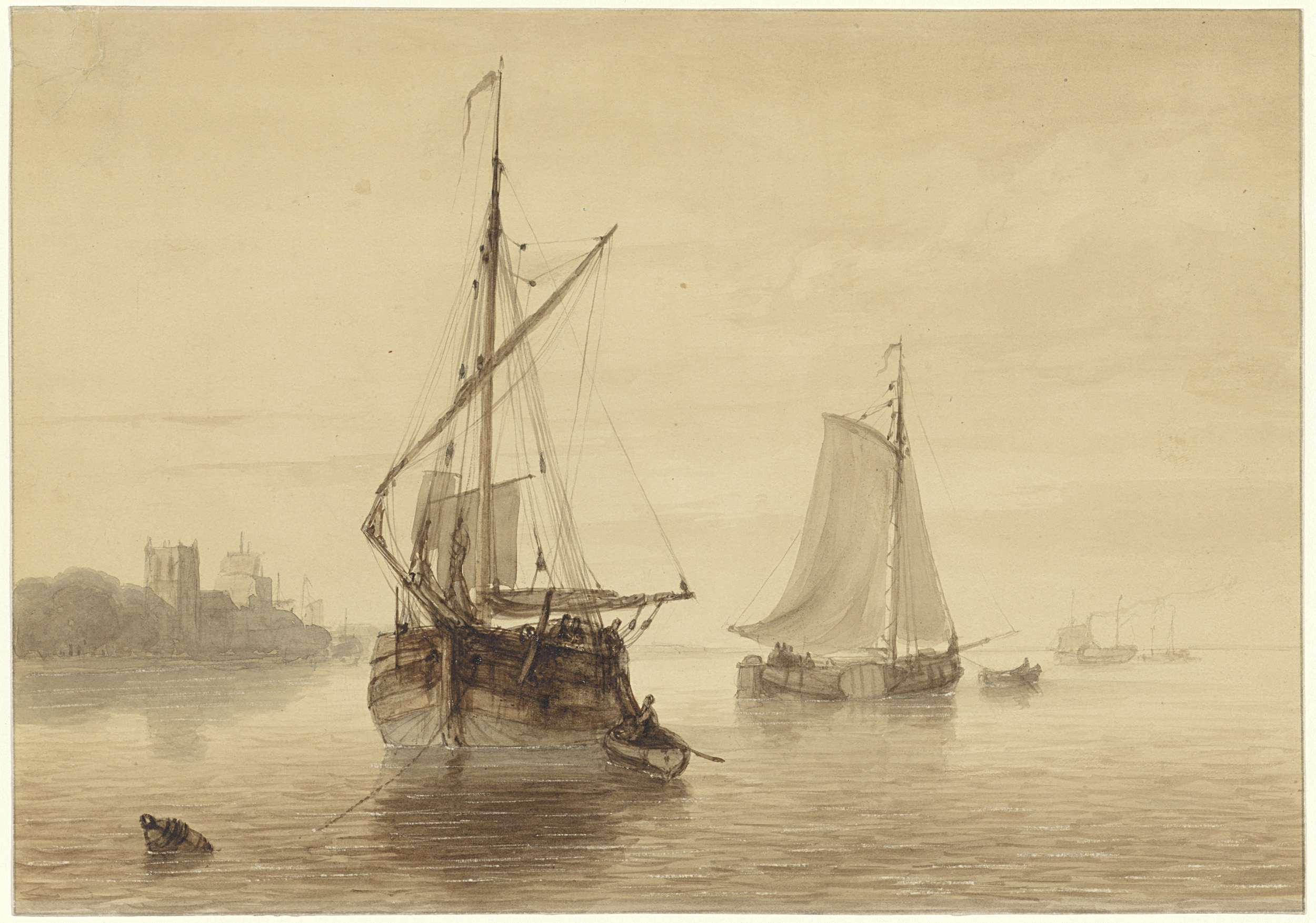
River landscape with ships

Roosenboom was one of the many students of Schelfhout. In his landscapes he evinced an interest in 17th-century Dutch landscape paintings that was similar to his master's. He combined his study of old Dutch masters with vigorous outdoor sketching.
