= Hendrik Dirk Kruseman van Elten =

Dutch landscape painter

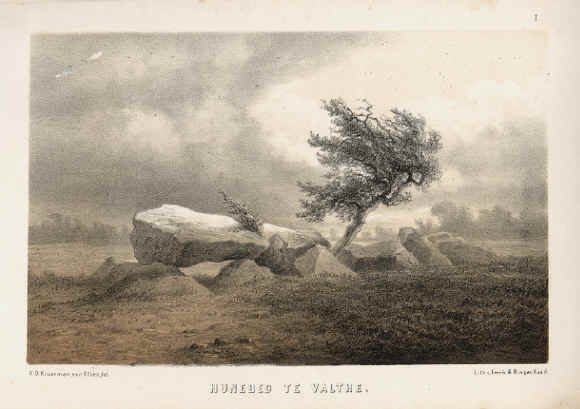
Hunebed te Valthe

Hendrik Dirk Kruseman van Elten (Alkmaar; November 14, 1829 in Alkmaar — July 12, 1904 in Paris) was a Dutch landscape painter, etcher and lithographer.

He studied in Haarlem, later with Cornelis Lieste, and later in Germany, Switzerland, Tirol, Brussels and Amsterdam. In 1865 he moved to New York City, from 1870 to 1873, he moved back to Europe and in 1883 he became a member or the National Academy Museum and School.
