= Fredrik Marinus Kruseman =

Dutch painter

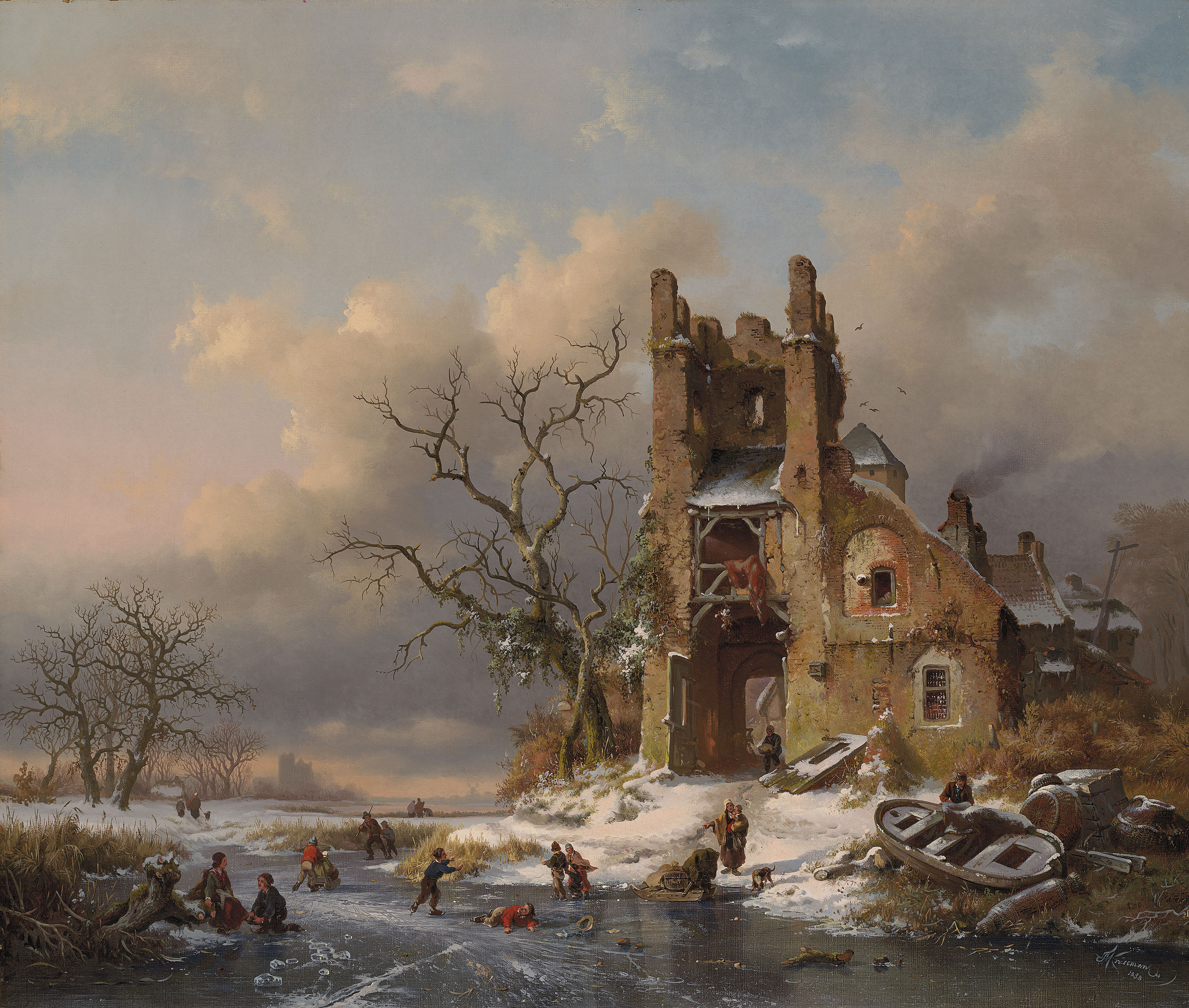
Winter Scene with Skaters on a Frozen Lake

Fredrik Marinus Kruseman (12 July 1816 – 25 May 1882) was a Dutch painter who specialized in Romantic-style landscapes.

== Biography ==
Born in Haarlem, he was the fourth son of Philip Benjamin Kruseman (1781–1842), a hatter, and Jacoba Mooij. He received his first drawing lessons from Jan Reekers (1790–1858) and attended the Vocational School in Haarlem from 1832 to 1833. That year, he began to study painting with Nicolaas Johannes Roosenboom and, in 1835, moved to the Gooi, where he took advanced studies with Jan van Ravenswaay. He also studied briefly with the landscape painter Barend Cornelis Koekkoek.

After a short time back in Haarlem, he went to Kleve, where he painted landscapes, then returned home in 1839. Two years later, he moved to Brussels where, except for a few months in Paris, he remained until 1852. After four years at home in Haarlem, he went back to Belgium and lived there until his death in Saint-Gilles in 1882.

In his output of approximately 300 to 350 paintings, only three still lifes are known and the rest are landscapes. He also made a large number of drawings. From 2000 to 2001, his paintings were part of an exhibition at the Valkhof Museum in Nijmegen called "Delightful natural scenes: Romantic landscape painters in Beek and Ubbergen 1810-1860".
