= Stedelijk Museum Zwolle =

Former museum in Zwolle, the Netherlands

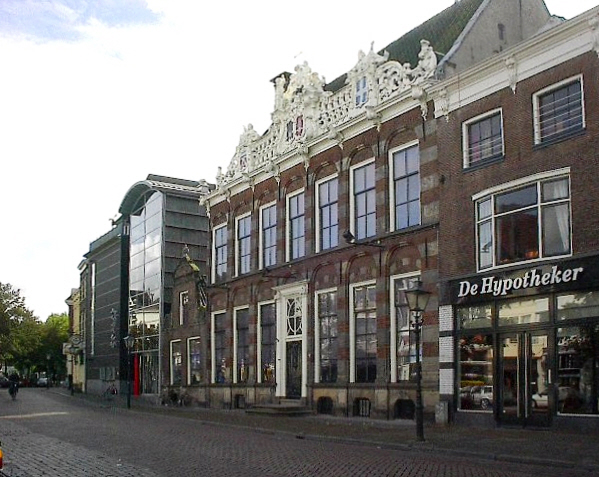
- Established: 1996
- Location: Milk Market 41, Zwolle
- Coordinates: 52°30′46.81″N 6°4′25.77″E

Stedelijk Museum Zwolle was a modern art museum located in Zwolle, Netherlands. It features a wide range of contemporary art exhibitions as it, showcasing works by established and emerging artists. The museum promotes on Dutch and international contemporary art, and its exhibitions and collection cover a variety of mediums, including painting, sculpture, photography, and video. Notable artists whose works held by the museum include Pieter van Noort and Hendrick ten Oever.

It was the cultural center for the city of Zwolle and the surrounding region till its closure.

== Closure ==
After a council meeting in 2017, the museum was closed and its content were moved to the Historical Center Overijssel. This happened 2 weeks after a major fire incident at the museum that caused hundreds of thousands of euros in damage. In 2022, Anno Museum was opened in the same building as a different museum entirely.
