= Paul Gabriël =

Dutch painter and draftsman (1828–1903)

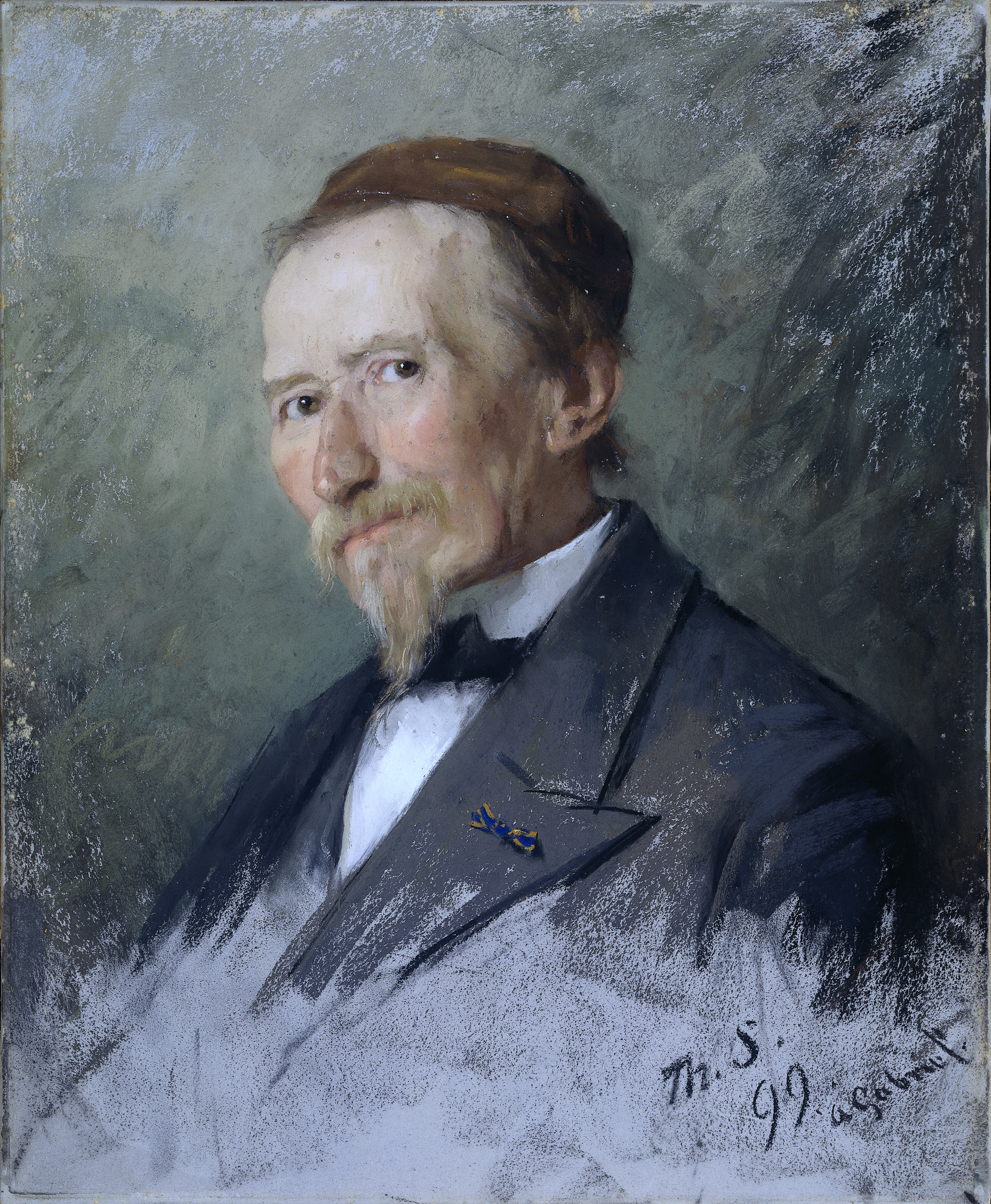
Portrait of Paul Gabriel in 1899 by Therese Schwartze

Paul Joseph Constantin Gabriël or Paul Gabriël (5 July 1828 – 23 August 1903) was a painter, draftsman, watercolorist, and etcher who belonged to the Hague School.

== Biography ==
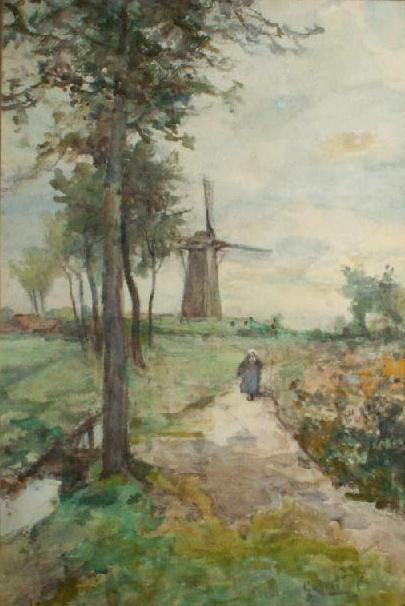
Polder Landscape, watercolor

Gabriël was born in Amsterdam, the son of the sculptor and painter, Paul Joseph Gabriël. From 1840 until 1843 he was educated at the State Academy of Fine Arts in Amsterdam, where he was a pupil of Louis Zocher. The following year he went to the German town of Cleves, where Barend Cornelis Koekkoek had founded a drawing academy. Later he returned to the Netherlands and studied with Cornelis Lieste in Haarlem. Here he became acquainted with Anton Mauve, with whom he was to work with often.

In 1853 Gabriël moved to Oosterbeek, also called the 'Dutch Barbizon', where landscape painter Johannes Warnardus Bilders had gathered around him many young painters. The members of this group would later become central figures in the Hague School. In 1858, Gabriël introduced Anton Mauve to the area, who would return there ten years in a row and would become good friends with Gerard Bilders, the son of Johannes Warnardus.

When Gabriël returned to Amsterdam to live, he had a hard time and moved to Brussels. There he was befriended by Willem Roelofs and benefited from Roelofs' social position in the art world of Brussels. There he met Hendrik Willem Mesdag, also a student of Roelofs.

Gabriël was also influenced by the painters of the Barbizon School, whose works were regularly exhibited in Brussels. Helped by Roelofs' suggestions, he developed into a good landscape painter, with a clear palette. Gabriël's paintings stand out from the 'grey tones' for which the Hague School was famous because of his clear use of color. His work was less an impression of atmosphere than a consequence of the immediate effect of the sunny Dutch landscape. The more he looked at the Dutch landscape, the more color he perceived in it. He described the Dutch countryside as 'colorful, juicy, fat' and said 'Our land is not grey, even when the weather is grey.'

From 1862 onwards, Gabriel regularly embarked on study trips to the Netherlands: first to Arnhem and Oosterbeek, in 1866 to Veenendaal, in the seventies to Abcoude and Vreeland, and from 1875 to the lakes around Nieuwkoop near Noorden. Around 1880, he spent the summers in Kortenhoef, on Kampereiland and in Giethoorn. He visited the places in Overijssel with Willem Bastiaan Tholen. But it was only in 1864 that Gabriel would permanently return to the Netherlands. At that time he moved to Scheveningen, where he bought a house next to his student Geesje Mesdag-van Calcar. Together they painted still lifes with flowers.

In this period he often painted the brook near Voorschoten, as well as in Broeksloot (1886), Oosterbeek (c. 1887), Kinderdijk and Heeze. In 1886, he stayed with the Mesdags at their home in Vries in Drente, where he made studies of the fields, barns and farms. In this period Gabriel also received recognition in the Netherlands. Museums purchased some of his important pieces, including 'The Pottery in Kampen', purchased by the Gemeentemuseum Den Haag in 1890.

In Kortenhoef one of his pupils was Bernard van Beek.

Gabriel died 23 August 1903 in his home in Scheveningen.

== Gallery ==
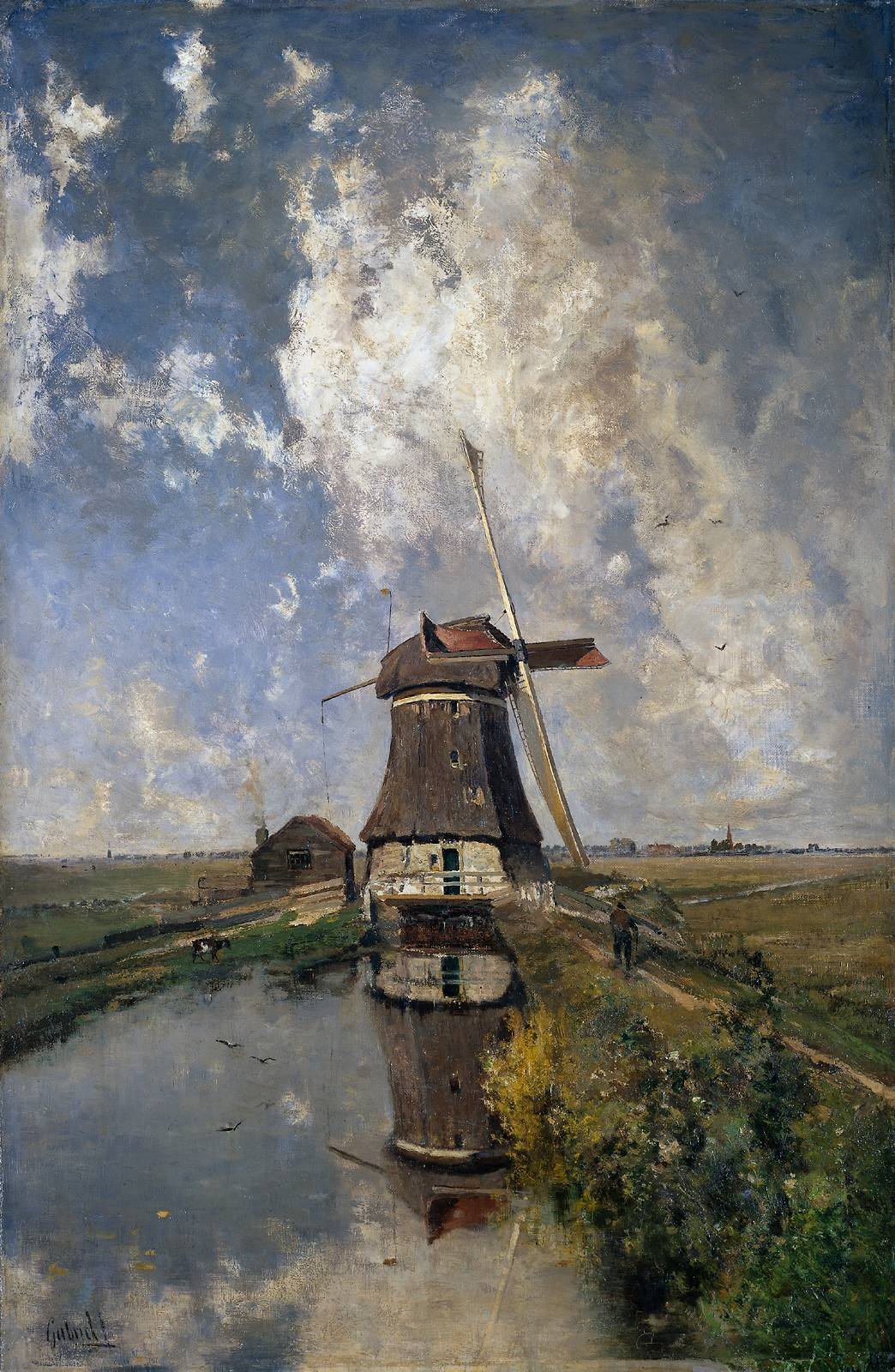
In the Month of July

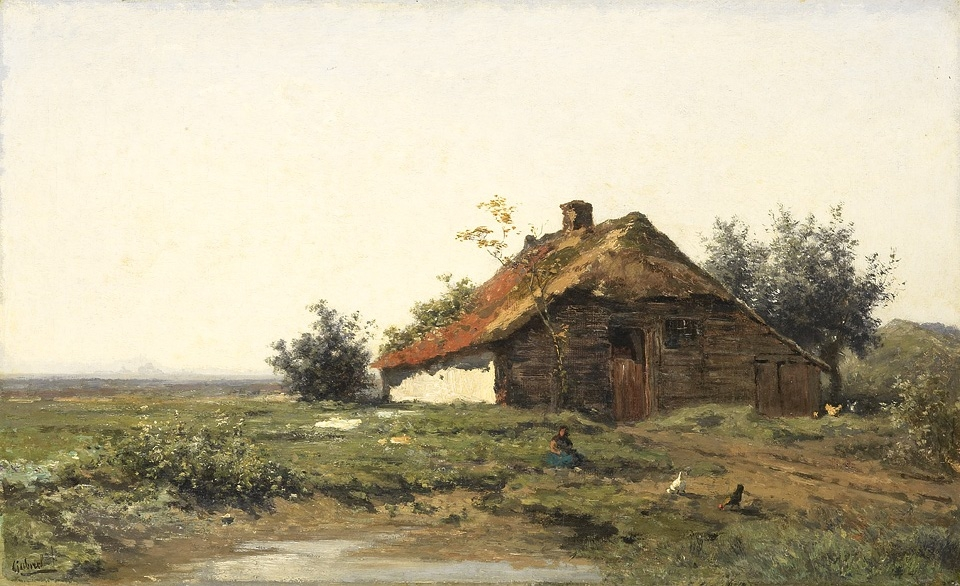
Farmhouse in an Open Field

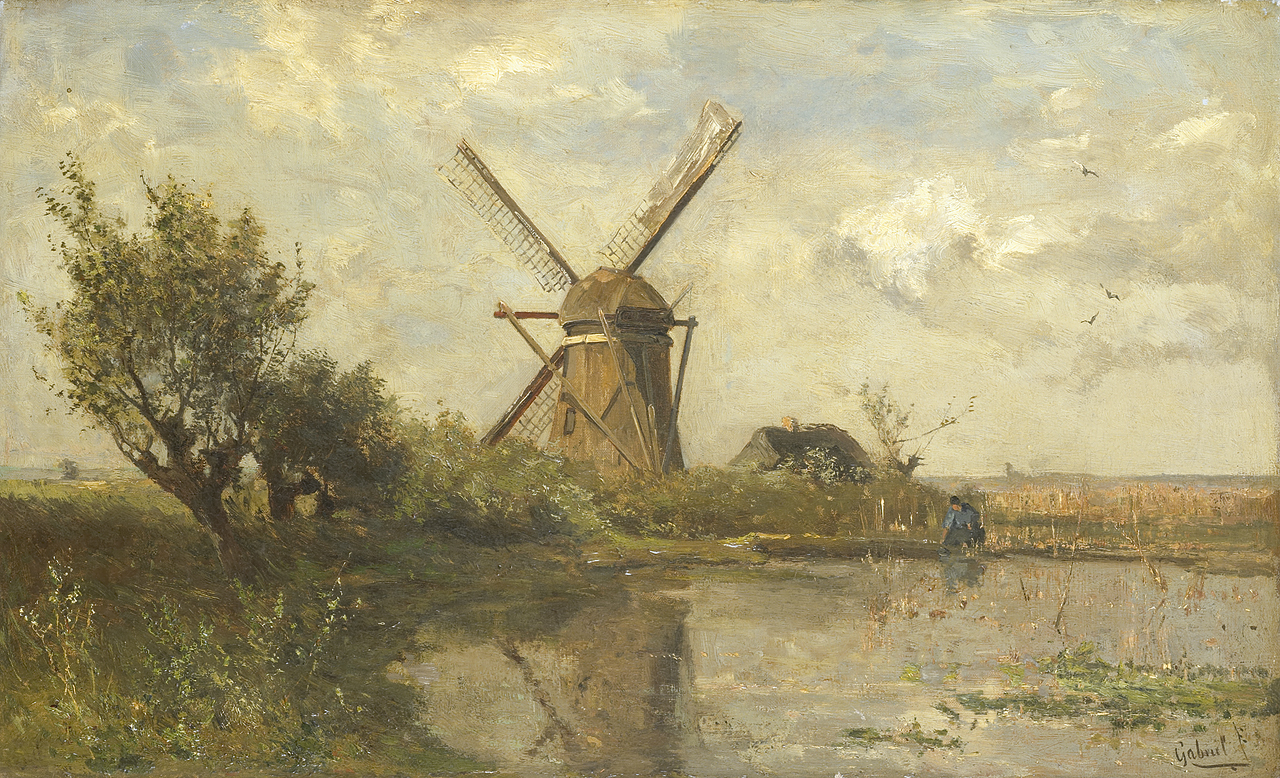
Mill On a Lake

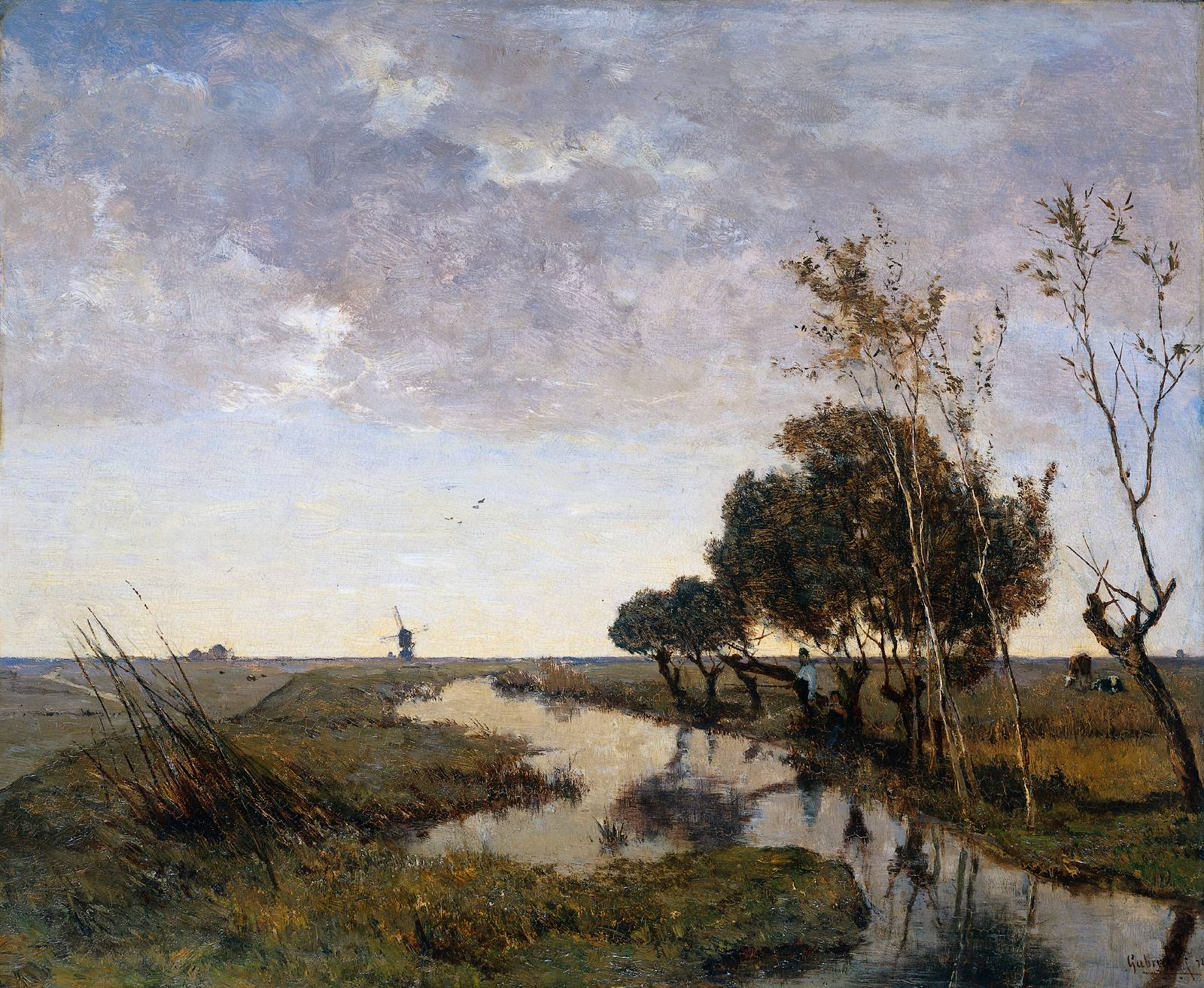
A Watercourse at Abcoude

== Paintings in museums ==
- Rijksmuseum, Amsterdam
- Rijksmuseum Paleis het Loo, Apeldoorn
- Gemeentemuseum, Arnheim
- Dordrechtsmuseum, Dordrecht
- Rijksmuseum Twenthe, Enschede
- Stedelijk Museum, Enschede
- Stedelijk Museum, Gouda
- Groninger Museum, Groningen
- Teyler Museum, Haarlem
- Van Rede Bequest, The Hague
- Museum Mesdag, The Hague
- Stadthuis, The Hague
- Kasteel het Nuijenhuis, Heino
- Singer, Laren
- Zeeuws Museum, Middelburg
- Jan Cunem Museum, Oss
- Rijksmuseum Kröller-Müller, Otterlo
- Museum Boymans-van Beuningen, Rotterdam
- Raadhuis, Vorden

== Selected bibliographies ==
- Denninger-Schreuder, Carole: De Onvergankelijke Kijk Op Kortenhoef - Een Schildersdorp in beeld, Uitgeverij Thoth, Bussum, 1998, ISBN 90-6868-215-6, pp 15–35.
- Peters, Moniek and Tempel, Benno: Paul Joseph Constantin Gabriëlk 1828 — 1903, Colorist van de Haagse School, Dordrechts Museum, Dordrecht, 1998, ISBN 90-400-9225-7.
- Sillevis, John and Tabak, Anne, The Hague School Book, Waanders Uitgevers, Zwolle, 2004, pp 245–250.
