= Zorgvlied (cemetery) =

Dutch cemetery

Coordinates: 52°20′8″N 4°54′1″E

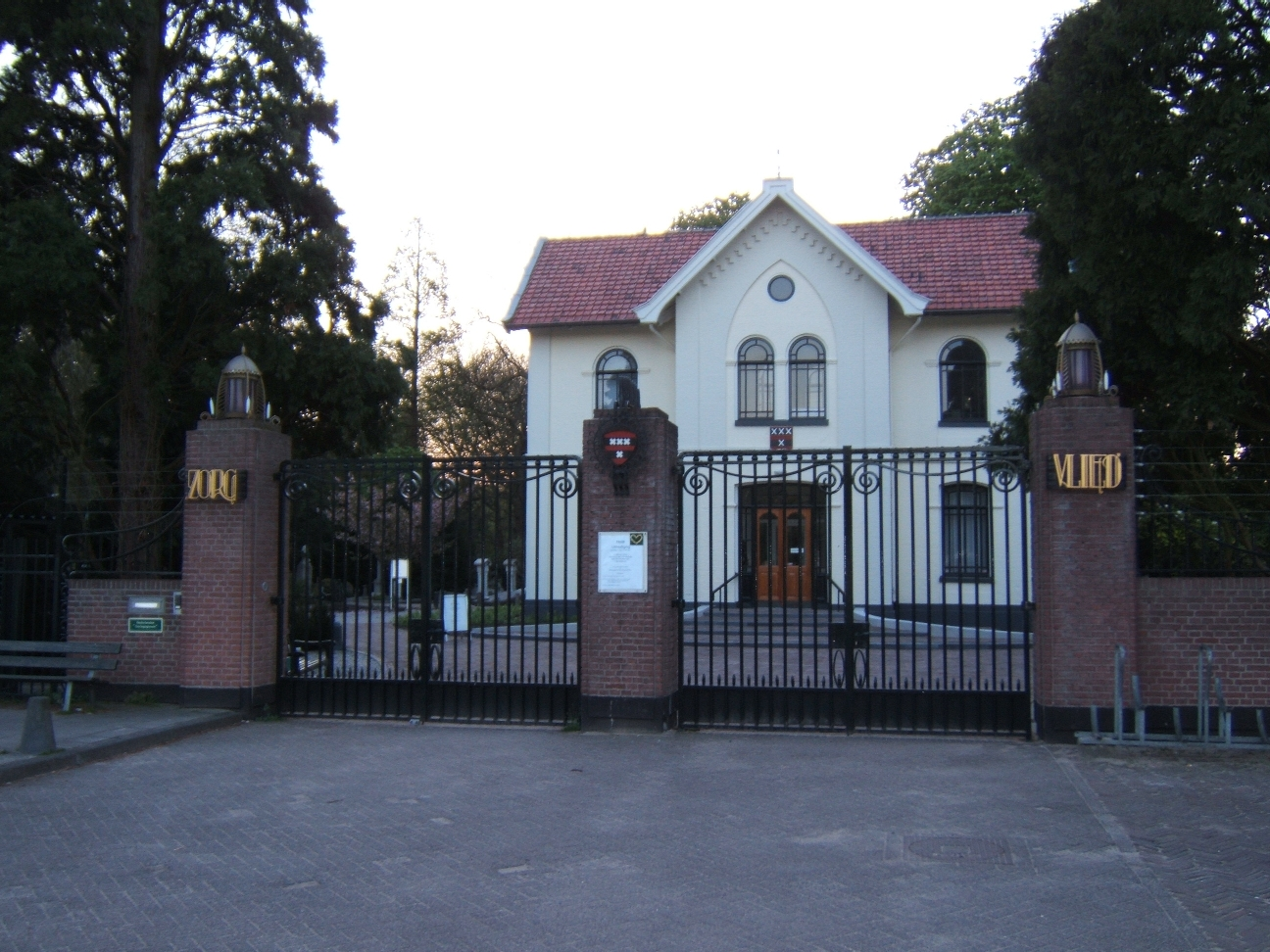
Zorgvlied entrance

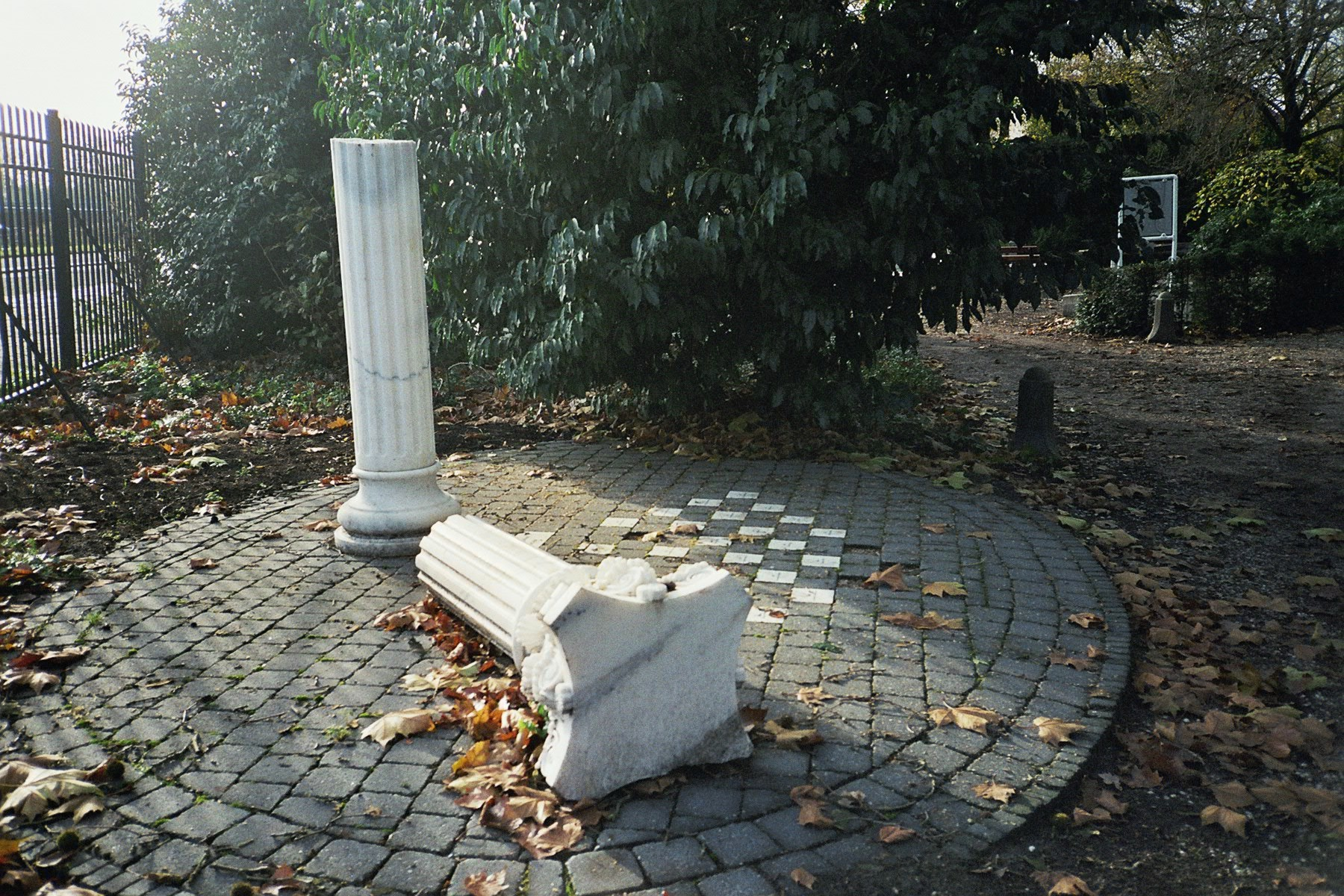
Gebroken Kolom, writers' monument

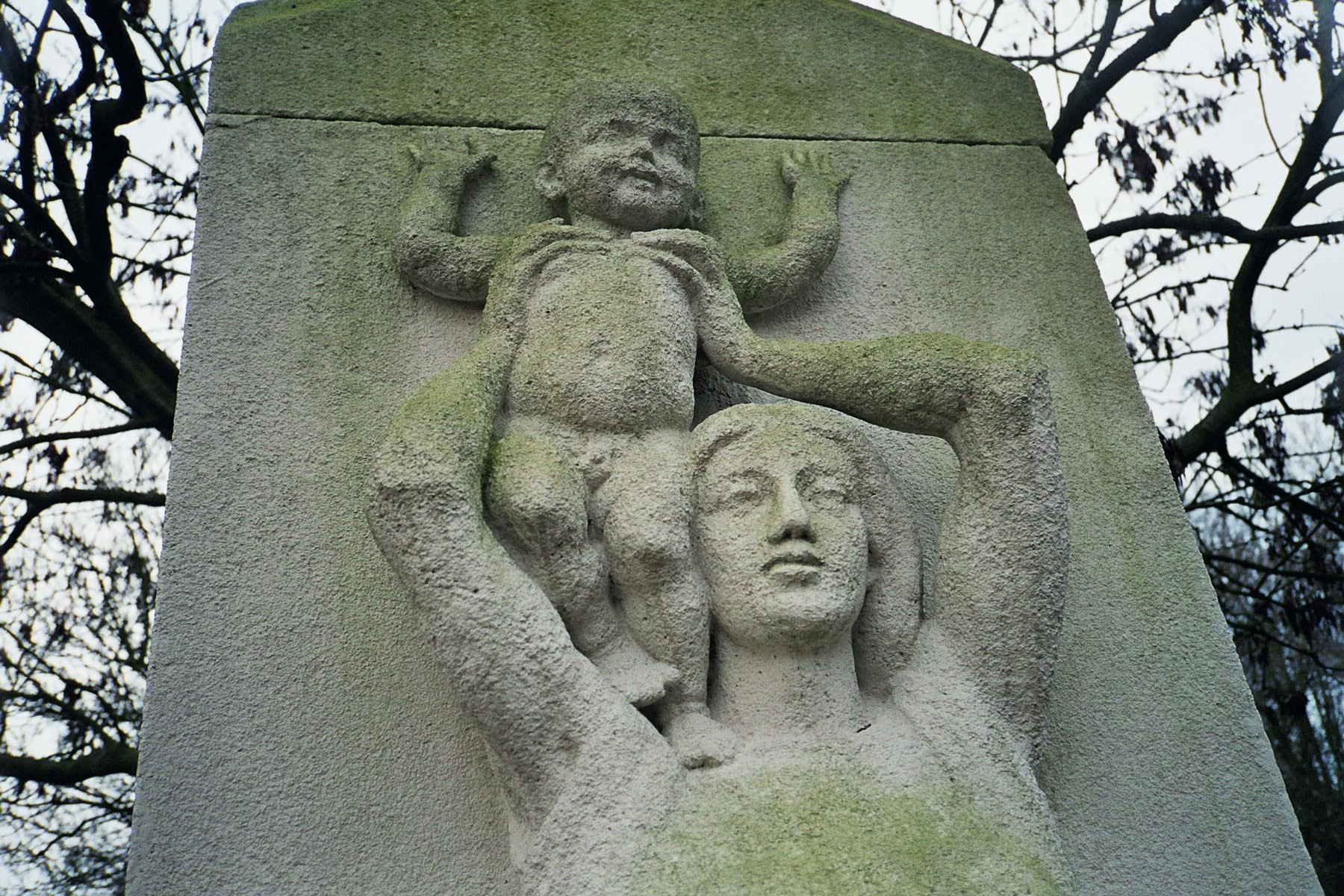
Moedermonument

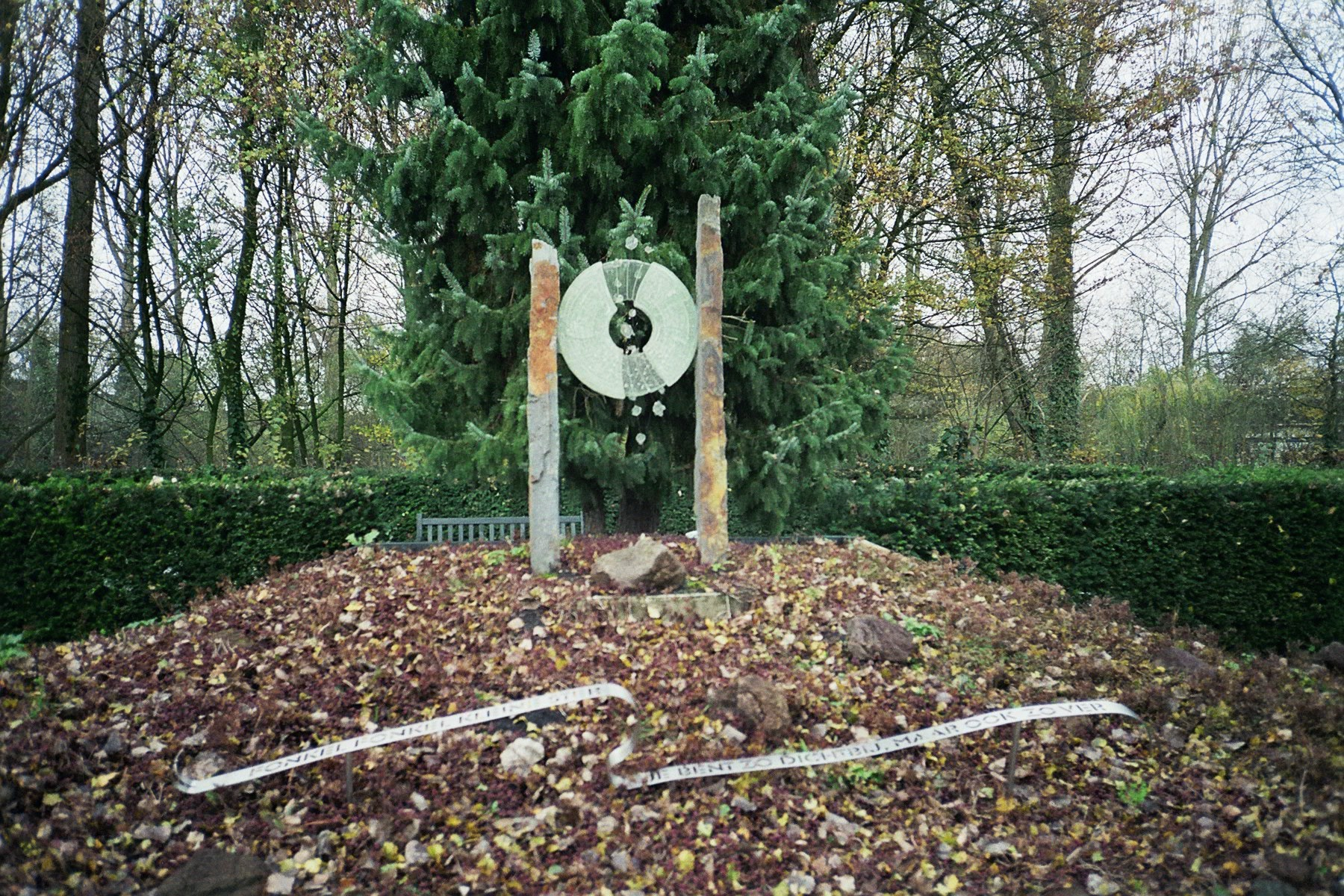
Sterretjesveld

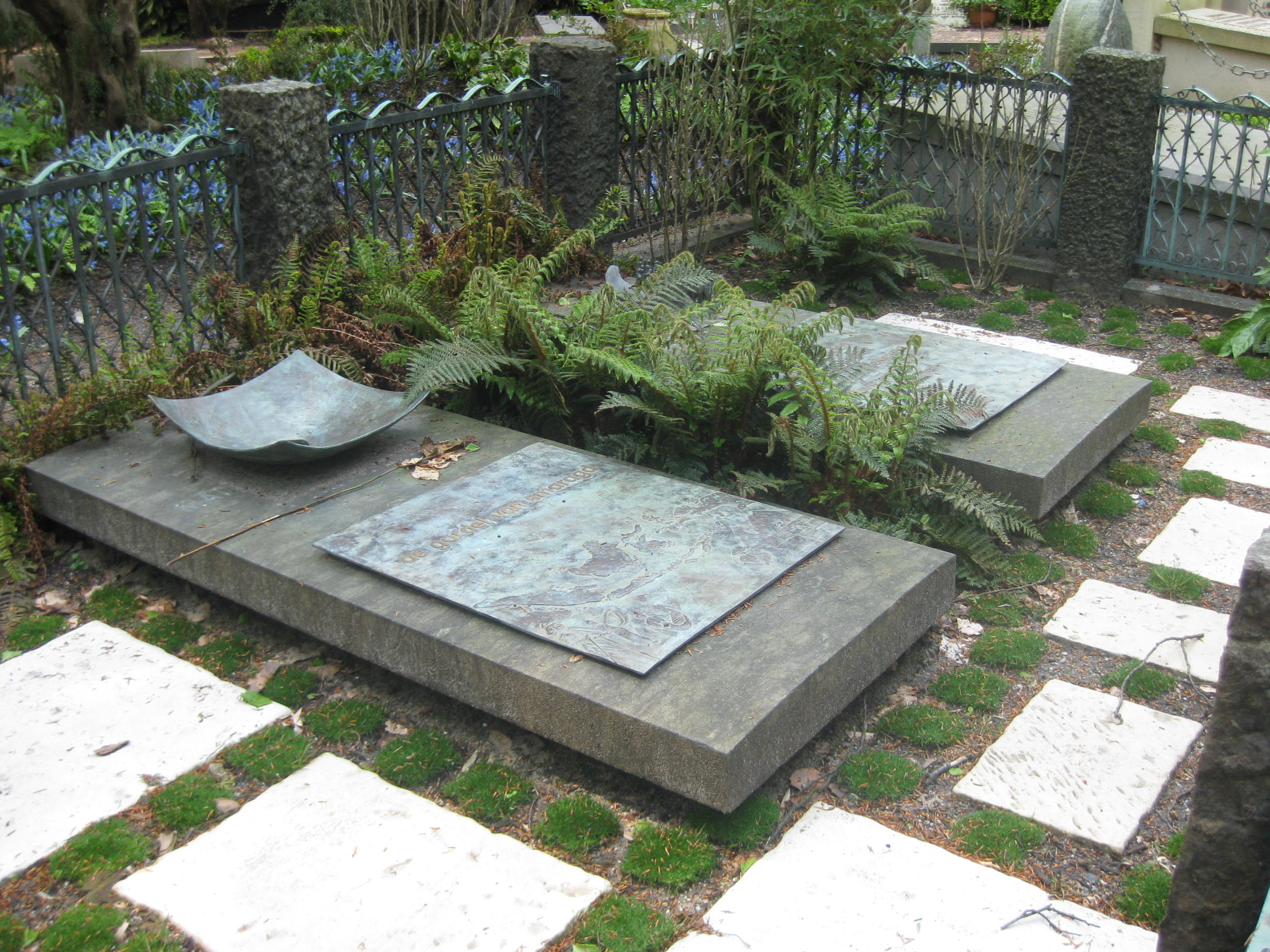
Gordel van Smaragd

Zorgvlied (Dutch pronunciation: [ˈzɔr(ə)xflit]) is a cemetery on the Amsteldijk in Amsterdam, the Netherlands, on the left bank of the river Amstel. The cemetery was opened in 1870 by the city of Amstelveen which still owns and operates it, though since 1896 (when city lines were redrawn) it is located within the boundaries of the city of Amsterdam. One of the country's best-known cemeteries, it is notable for the large number of celebrities, especially from the literary and theater worlds, buried there.

== History ==
The cemetery takes its name from the villa on whose grounds it is built. The design, by Jan David Zocher, is in the English garden style. Zorgvlied was expanded in 1892 by Zocher's son, Louis Paul Zocher, and again in 1900, 1919, and 1926, when it became a burial place for the upper classes who had often been buried in Westerveld in Driehuis. An atrium was added in 1930.

== Notable monuments ==
Perceptions of death and burial have changed considerably. After the 1994 burial of Manfred Langer, whose monument features him holding a glass of beer, some burials have become more extrovert. After a dispute over the burial of visual artist Peter Giele, the board of directors of Zorgvlied set aside a special area, called Paradiso, for monuments with extraordinary appearance or dimensions.

== Rijksmonuments ==
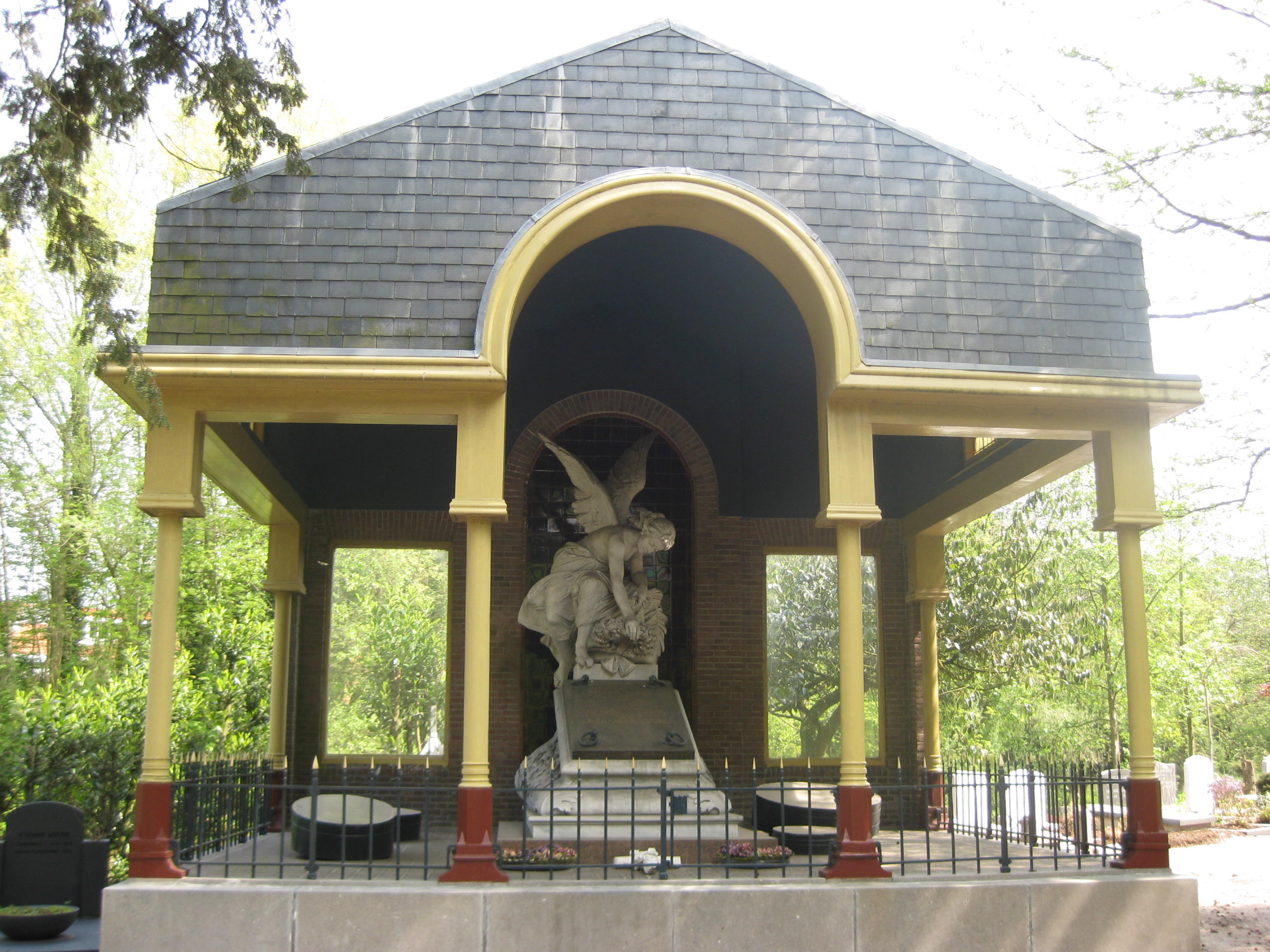
Monument of the Dorrepaal family (Rijksmonument)

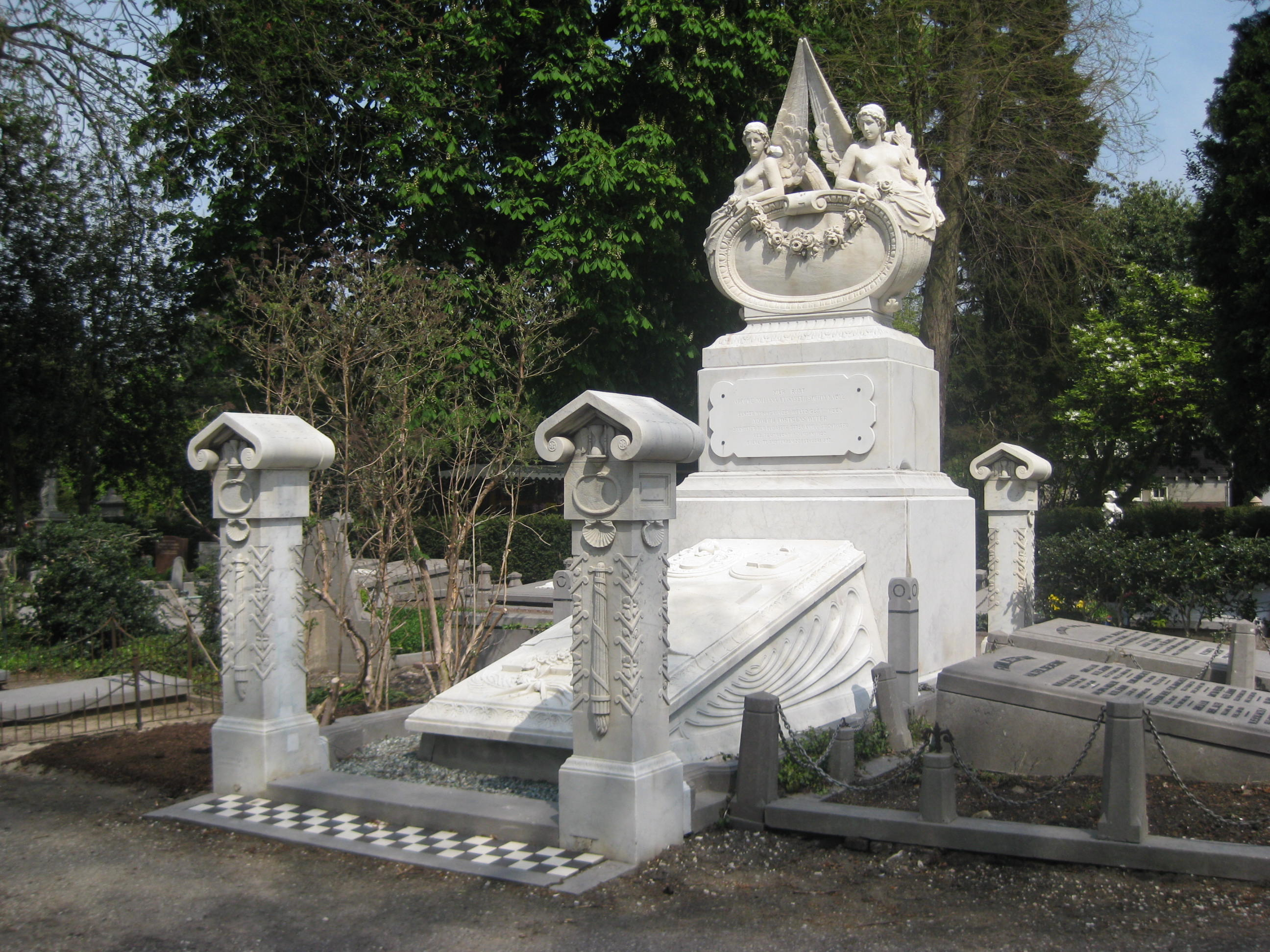
Grave of the Johanna Elisabeth Sophia Knoll family (Rijksmonument)

The cemetery itself (the park and its paths), as well as a number of grave sites, were added to the list of Rijksmonuments in March 2008:

- Park construction, 1869-1931 (design Jan David Zocher junior, L. van der Bijl, and C.P. Broerse)
- Pathways, 1869-1931 (J.D. Zocher junior, L. van der Bijl en C.P. Broerse)
- Villa, 1869
- Gates and fences, 1926
- Atrium, 1931 (design K.J. Mijnarends)
- Monument for Oscar Carré, 1891 (design J.P.F. van Rossum en W.J. Vuyk)
- Monument for Dorrepaal family, 1886 (statue based on a design by Frans Stracké)
- Monument for Von Rath-Bunge family, 1894
- Monument for Margot G. Mulder, 1889
- Monument for Sophie de Vries, 1892 (statue designed by H. Texeira de Mattos)
- Monument for P.W. Jansen, 1906 (built by H. Kautsch)
- Monument for Hartog van Banda family, 1873
- Monument for the Johanna Elisabeth Sophia Knoll family, 1900

== Graves of notables ==
=== A ===
- Jan van Aartsen, politician (1909-1992)
- Ab Abspoel, actor (1925-2000)
- Ben Albach, theater historian (1907-2007)
- Gerard A.N. Allebé, doctor (1810-1892)
- August Allebé, painter (1838-1927)
- Martin van Amerongen, journalist (1941-2002)
- Hans Andreus, writer (1926-1977)
- Sjef Annink, dancer (1971-1999)
- Milo Anstadt, TV producer and writer (1920-2011)
- Feliks Arons, actor, director (1944-1992)
- Abraham Asscher, business person, and president of the Jewish Council during World War II (1880-1950)
- René van Ast, cellist (1938-1985)
- Elisabeth Augustin, writer (1903-2001)

=== B ===
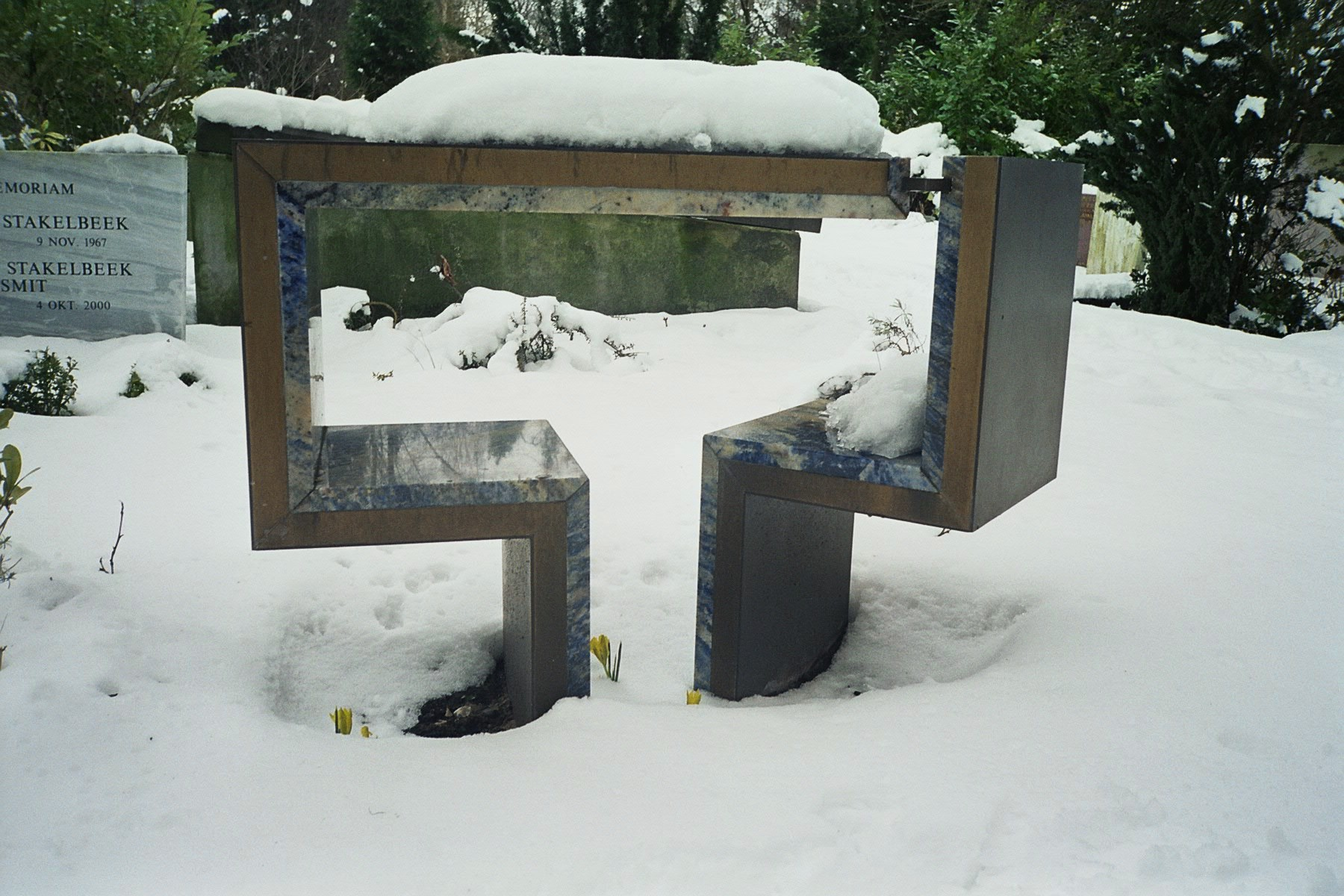
Grave of Anneke van Baalen

- Anneke van Baalen, feminist (1937-1997)
- Tabe Bas, actor, singer (1927-2009)
- Martinus Beek, theologian (1909-1987)
- Wim Beeren, museum president (1928-2000)
- Fritz Behrendt, cartoonist (1925-2008)
- Jacob Bendien, painter (1890-1933)
- Rik van Bentum, painter (1936-1994)
- Ans van den Berg, painter (1873-1942)
- Chris Berger, athlete (1911-1965)
- Eva Besnyö, photographer (1910-2004)
- Willem van Beusekom, TV producer (1947-2006)
- Paul Biegel, writer (1925-2006)
- Ronny Bierman, actress, singer (1938-1984), removed
- Rina Blaaser, actress (1900-1968)
- Riny Blaaser, actress (1920-2009)
- Hetty Blok, cabaret artist, singer and actress (1920-2012)
- Jan Blok, guitarist (1923-1995)
- Ton Blommerde, visual artist (1946-2005)
- Felicien Bobeldijk, painter (1876-1964)
- Laurens Bodaan, preacher (1910-1977)
- Nelly Bodenheim, painter (1874-1951)
- Lodewijk de Boer, director, musician (1937-2004)
- Gerrit Bolkestein, politician (1871-1956)2010
- Thom Bollen, pianist (1933-2004)
- Andries Bonger, art collector (1861-1936)
- Kees Boomkens, TV producer (1939-1985), removed
- Johan Borgman, poet, artist (1889 - 1976)
- Emile van Bosch, singer (1886-1940)
- Henri Bosmans, cellist (1856-1896)
- Henriëtte Bosmans, pianist, composer (1895-1952)
- Sara Bosmans-Benedicts, pianist (1861-1949)
- Louis Bouwmeester, actor (1842-1925)
- Rafaël Bouwmeester, actor (1878-1926)
- Jack Bow, choreographer (1908-1996)
- Johan Braakensiek, painter, graphic artist (1858-1940)
- Gerard den Brabander, poet (1900-1968)
- Louis de Bree, actor (1884-1971), removed
- Frans Breukelman, theologian (1916-1993)
- Dunya Breur, writer (1942-2009)
- Martin Bril, writer (1959-2009)
- Joop van den Broek, painter (1928-1979)
- Chris Broerse, garden and landscape architect (1902-1995)
- Herman Brood, artist, singer (1946-2001)
- Huib Broos, stage actor (1941-2011)
- Gré Brouwenstijn, opera singer (1915-1999)
- Hein de Bruin, poet, writer (1899-1947)
- Harry Buckinx, cartoonist (1944-1995)
- Jan Buskes, preacher (1899-1980)

=== C ===
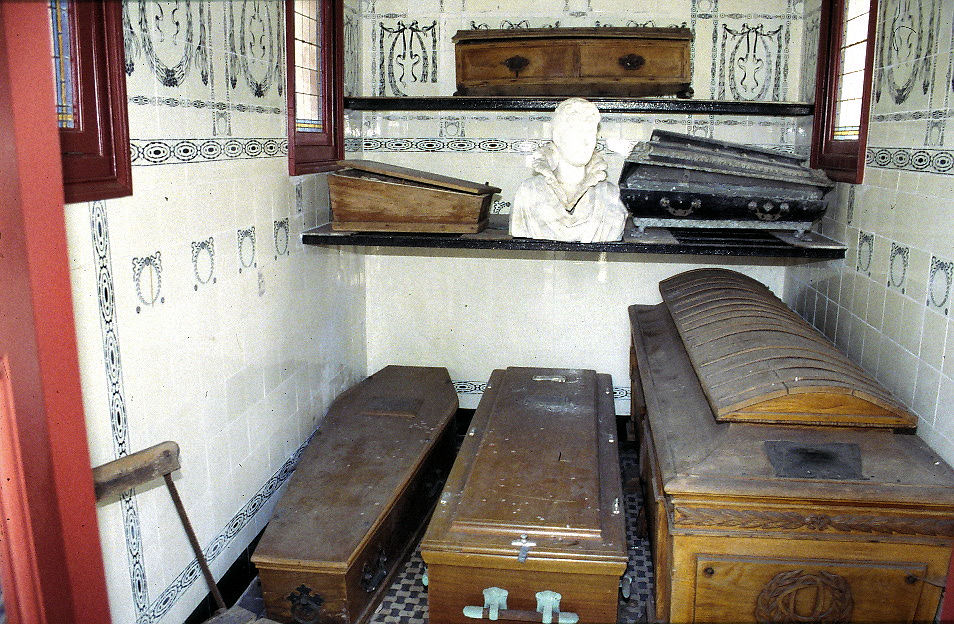
Interior of Carré's mausoleum

- Hélène Cals, opera singer (1903-1938)
- Oscar Carré, director Circus Carré (1846-1911)
- Louis Chrispijn, actor (1854-1926), removed
- Chun Wei Cheung, Olympian rower (1972-2006)
- Jojanneke Claassen, journalist, writer (1942-2008)
- Clovis Cnoop Koopmans, judge, city councilman for Amsterdam (1925-2008)
- Arie Colijn, mayor of Amstelveen 1916-1932 (1870-1932)
- Kitty Courbois, actress (1937-2017)
- Eduard Cuypers, architect (1859-1927)

=== D ===
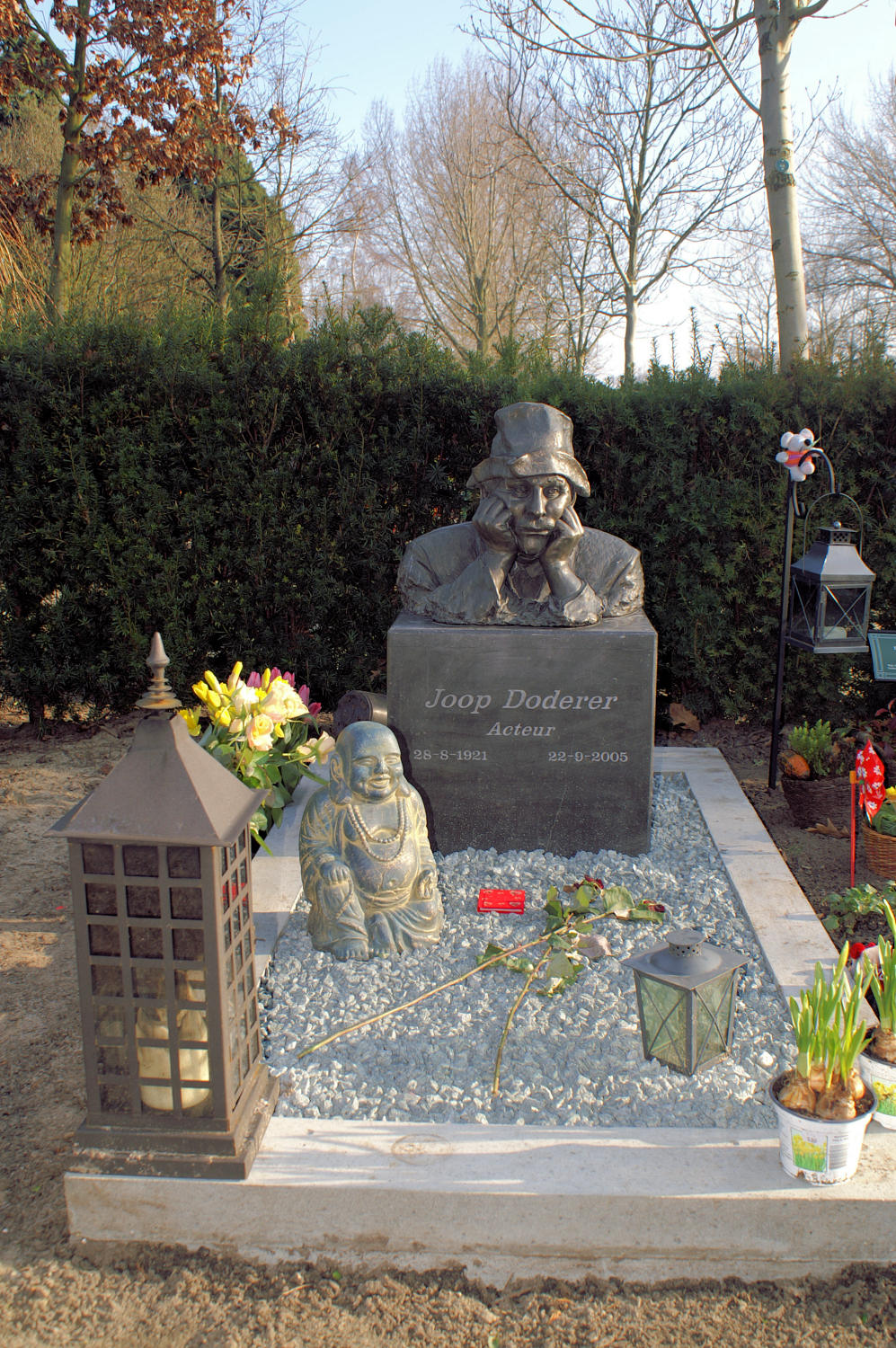
Grave of Joop Doderer

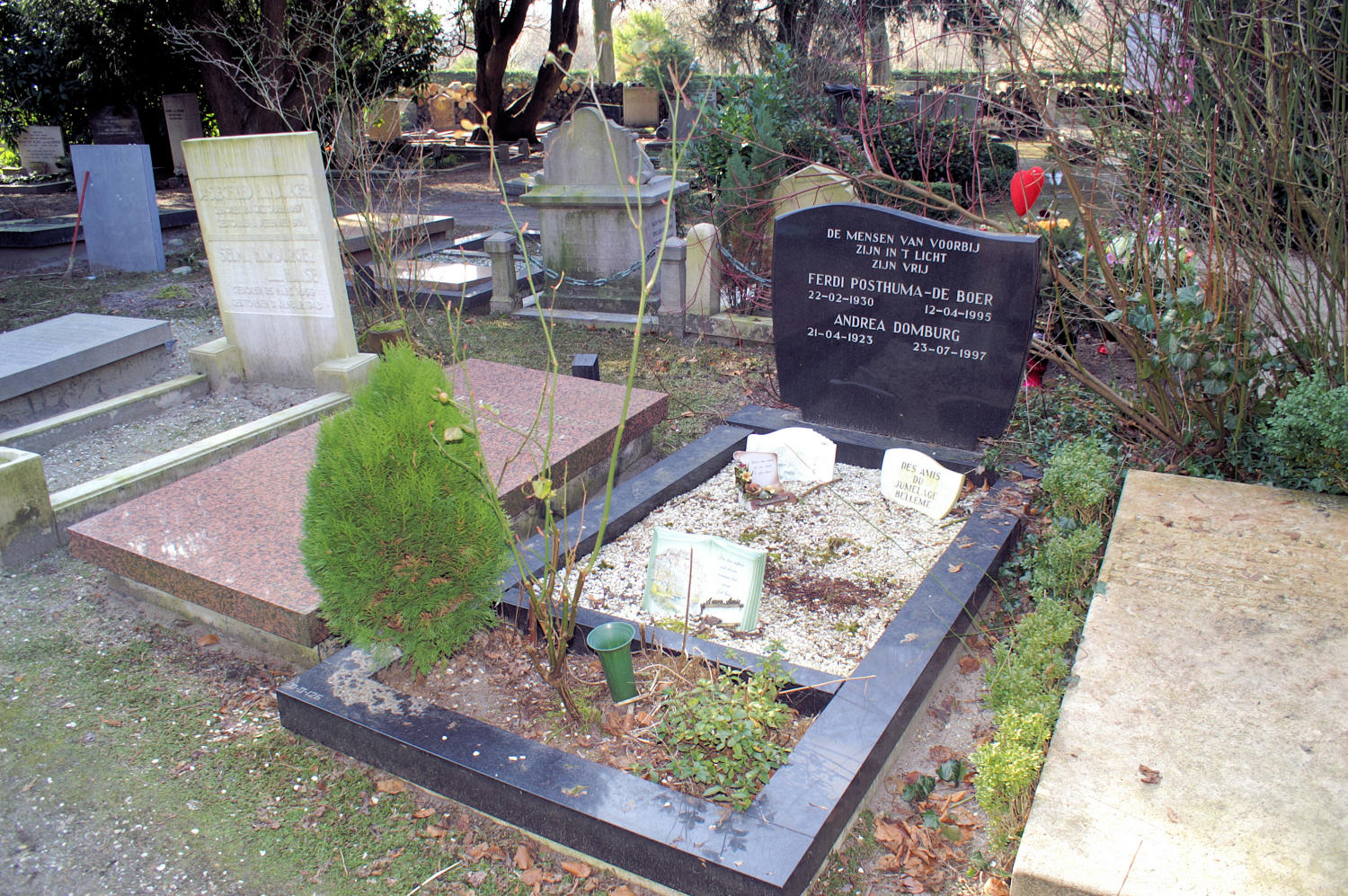
Grave of Andrea Domburg en Ferdi Posthuma de Boer

- Julia De Gruyter, actress (1887-1969)
- Paul Deen, actor (1915-1990)
- Lex van Delden, composer (1919-1988)
- Jetty van Delden-van Dijk, actress (1917-1985)
- Daniel Delprat, politicus (1890-1988)
- Cristina Deutekom, opera singer (1931-2014)
- Jef Diederen, artist (1920-2009)
- Ko van Dijk sr., actor (1880-1937), removed
- Marinus van Dijke, translator (1932-1999)
- Theo Dobbelman, artist (1906-1984)
- Joop Doderer, actor (1921-2005)
- Andrea Domburg, actress (1923-1997)
- Jan Hein Donner, chess master (1927-1988)
- Cornelis Dopper, composer (1870-1939)
- Gert-Jan Dröge, TV presenter (1943-2007)
- Jan Duiker, architect (1890-1935)
- Ton van Duinhoven, acteur (1921-2010)
- Kerwin Duinmeijer, murder victim (1968-1983)
- Wim Duisenberg, politician, banker (1935-2005)
- Arend Jan Dunning, cardiologist (1930-2009)
- Theodor Duquesnoy, translator (1942-1994)
- Dirk Durrer, cardiologist (1918-1984)
- Louis Dusée, songwriter (1930-1999)
- Mien Duymaer van Twist, actress (1891-1967)

=== E ===
- Wick Ederveen Janssen, actor, director (1953-1994)
- Willem Endstra, business person (1953-2004)
- Emile Enthoven, composer, lawyer (1903-1950)
- Felix Eijgenraam, journalist (1958-1994)
- Gertie Evenhuis, writer (1927-2005)
- Elisabeth Eybers, poet (1915-2007)
- Matthieu van Eysden, actor (1896-1970)
- Lau Ezerman, actor (1892-1940)

=== F ===
- Ina van Faassen, actress (1928-2011)
- Bobby Farrell, singer (1949-2010)
- Hans Faverey, poet (1933-1990)
- Len del Ferro, opera singer (1921-1992)
- Philip H. Fiedeldij Dop, pediatrician (1911-1991)
- Zoltan Forrai, photographer (1901-1996)
- Jean-Paul Franssens, writer (1938-2003)
- Géza Frid, pianist (1904-1989)
- Carl Friedman, writer, journalist (1952-2020)

=== G ===
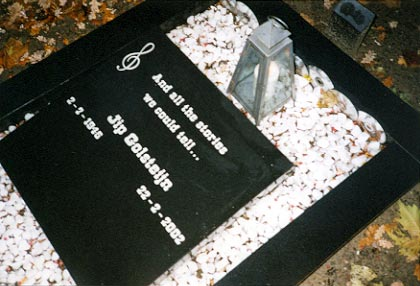
Grave of Jip Golsteijn

- Seth Gaaikema, cabaret artist, writer, and lyricist (1939-2014)
- Wilhelm Friedrich de Gaay Fortman, politician (1911-1997)
- Jacques Gans, journalist (1907-1972)
- Johannes Geelkerken, preacher (1879-1960)
- Rob van Gennep, publisher (1937-1994)
- Peter Giele, artist (1954-1999)
- Nina Goerres, sculptor (1941-2006)
- Jip Golsteijn, journalist (1945-2002)
- Frank Govers, fashion designer (1932-1997)
- Julien de Graef, actor (1883-1951)
- Gerhard von Graevenitz, artist (1934-1983)
- Bastiaan de Greef, architect (1818-1899)
- Annemarie Grewel, politician (1935-1998)
- Bob Groen, journalist (1937-1989)
- Robert Jasper Grootveld, artist (1932-2009)

=== H ===
- Frans Halsema, cabaret artist (1939-1984)
- Meyer Hamel, cabaret artist, writer (1895-1965)
- Albert Hanken, mathematician, inventor, and Emeritus Professor (1926-2016)
- Roelof Hart, doctor, philanthropist (1837-1892)
- Johannes Petrus Hasebroek, linguist, preacher, writer, poet (1812-1896)
- Heere Heeresma, writer (1932-2011)
- Herman Heijermans, dramatist (1864-1924)
- Gerard Adriaan Heineken, founder of Heineken (1841-1893)
- Henry Pierre Heineken, beer brewer (1886-1971)
- Bob van Hellenberg Hubar, film producer(1950-2008)
- Ben Hemelsoet, theologian (1929-1999)
- Marion Herbst, artist (1944-1995)
- Hans Herkuleijns, motorcycle racer (1889-1948)
- Jac Hermans, business person (1916-2007)
- Carol van Herwijnen, actor (1941-2008)
- Sara Heyblom, actress (1892-1990)
- Tonio Hildebrand, race car driver (1931-2005)
- Dick Hillenius, author, biologist (1927-1987)
- Huberdina Hiskemuller, revue artist (1912-2002)
- Maria Hofker-Rueter, artist (1902-1999)
- Greet Hofmans, mystic (1894-1968)
- Hak Holdert, publisher (1870-1944)
- Jan Willem Holsbergen, writer (1915-1995)
- Jan Holtrop, actor, director (1862-1917)
- Adriaan van der Horst, stage actor and director (1868-1942)
- Wilhelmina van der Horst-van der Lugt Melsert, stage actress(1871-1928)
- Betty Holtrop-van Gelder, actress, writer (1866-1963)
- Bart van Hove, sculptor (1850-1914)
- Paul Huf, photographer (1924-2002)
- Bart Huges, researcher (1934-2004)
- Hellen Huisman, actress (1937-2012)
- Cor Hund, sculptor, painter (1915-2008)

=== I ===
- Corry Italiaander, actress (1886-1971), removed

=== J ===
- Adriaan Jaeggi, writer (1963-2008)
- Hans Jansen, scholar of contemporary Islam, author and politician (1942-2015)
- Peter Jaspers, writer (1906-1955)
- Loe de Jong, historian (1914-2005)
- Leen Jongewaard, actor (1927-1996)
- William Emanuël Juglall (1899-1980), politician

=== K ===
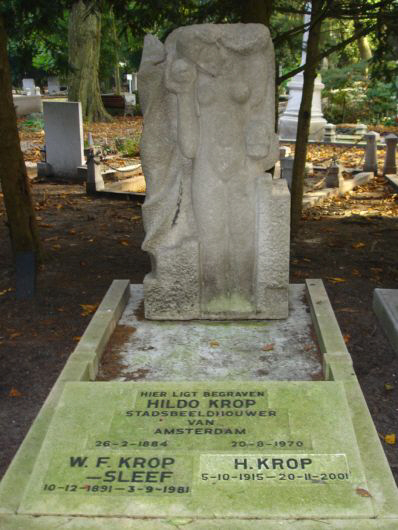
Grave of Hildo Krop

- Hans Kaart, opera singer(1920-1963)
- Johan Kaart, actor (1897-1976)
- Gerard Walden, revue-artiest (1909-2005)
- Martin Kalff, journalist (1848-1898)
- Antonie Kamerling, actor, singer (1966-2010)
- Martin Kaye, graphic designer (1932-1989)
- Frans Kellendonk, writer (1951-1990)
- Johan van der Keuken, photographer, documentary film maker (1938-2001)
- Cor Kint, composer, violist, viola d'amore player (1890-1944)
- Kho Liang Ie, industrial designer, architect (1927-1975)
- Michel de Klerk, architect, furniture designer (1884-1923)
- Arie Kleijwegt, radio journalist, chairman VPRO (1921-2001)
- Greet Koeman, singer (1910-1961)
- Hans Koetsier, artist, writer (1930-1991)
- Willem Kooiman, theologian (1903-1968)
- Jan Koopmans, theologian (1905-1945)
- Hendrik Koot, collaborator (1898-1941), removed
- Alfred Kossmann, writer (1922-1998)
- A.W. Krasnapolsky, hotelier (1834-1912)
- Bart Kreeft, actor (1854-1933)
- Hildo Krop, sculptor (1884-1970)
- Jacques Kruithof, writer (1947-2008)
- Cornelis Kruyswijk, architect Amsterdam School (1884-1935)
- Jan Kuiper, journalist (1942-1982)

=== L ===
- Harry Lammertink, cartoonist (YRRAH) (1932-1996)
- Lucas van der Land, political scientist (1923-1984)
- Guillaume Landré, composer, lawyer (1905-1968)
- Joep Lange, clinical researcher specialising in HIV therapy (1954-2014), victim of Malaysia Airlines Flight 17
- Manfred Langer, business person (1952-1994)
- Loe Lap, business person (1914-1993)
- Isidor Lateiner, violinist (1930-2005)
- Reinbert de Leeuw, conductor, composer and pianist (1938-2020)
- Ton Lensink, actor (1922-1997)
- Boris Lensky, violinist (1883-1972)
- Stine Lerou, actress (1901-1997)
- Catharina van der Linden, poet, writer (1909-2002)
- Wim van der Linden, TV producer, photographer (1941-2001)
- Charles Lücker, singer (1965-2008)
- Diana Renz-Luyckx, circus performer and director (1966-1996)

=== M ===
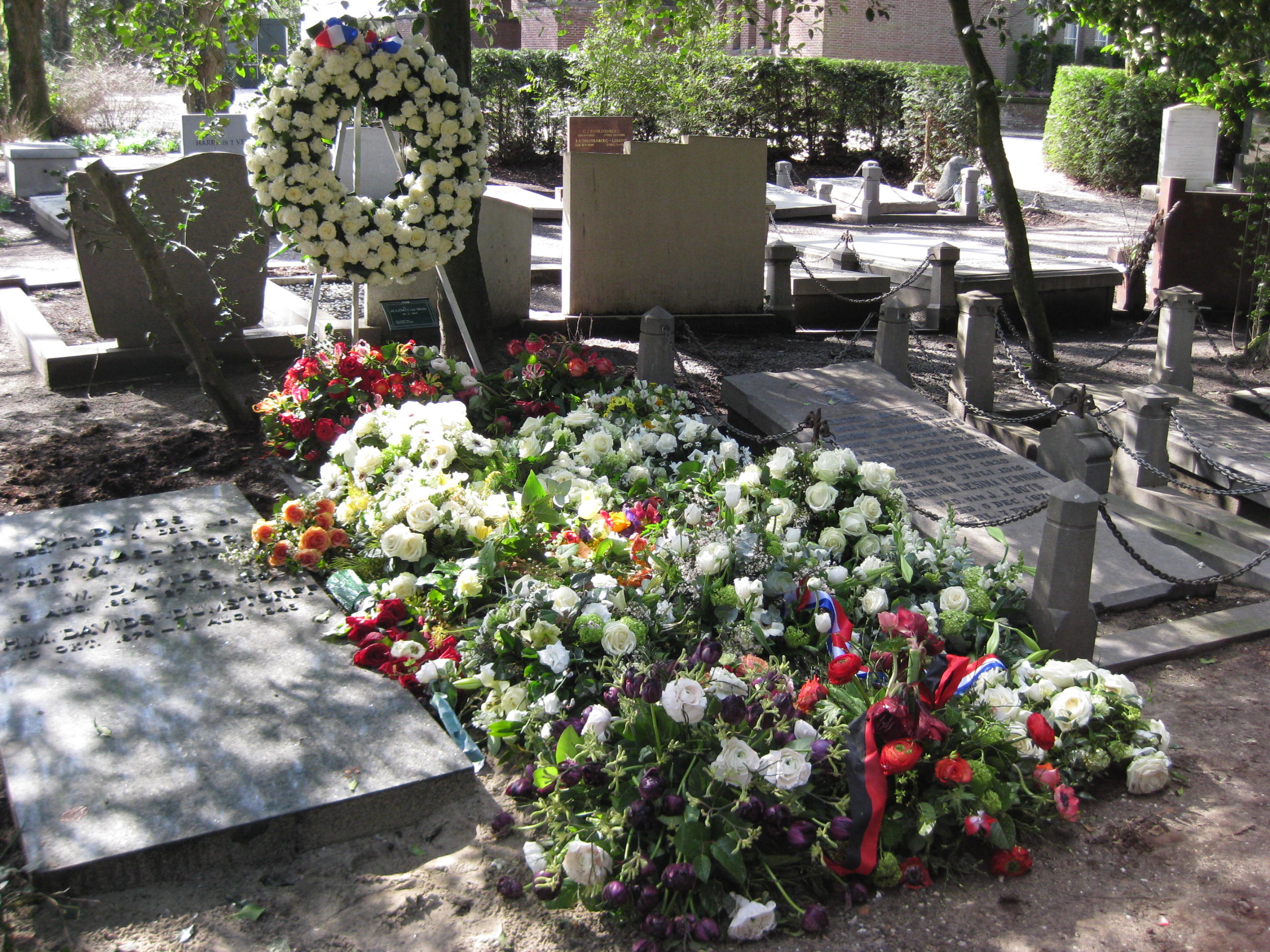
Grave of Hans van Mierlo

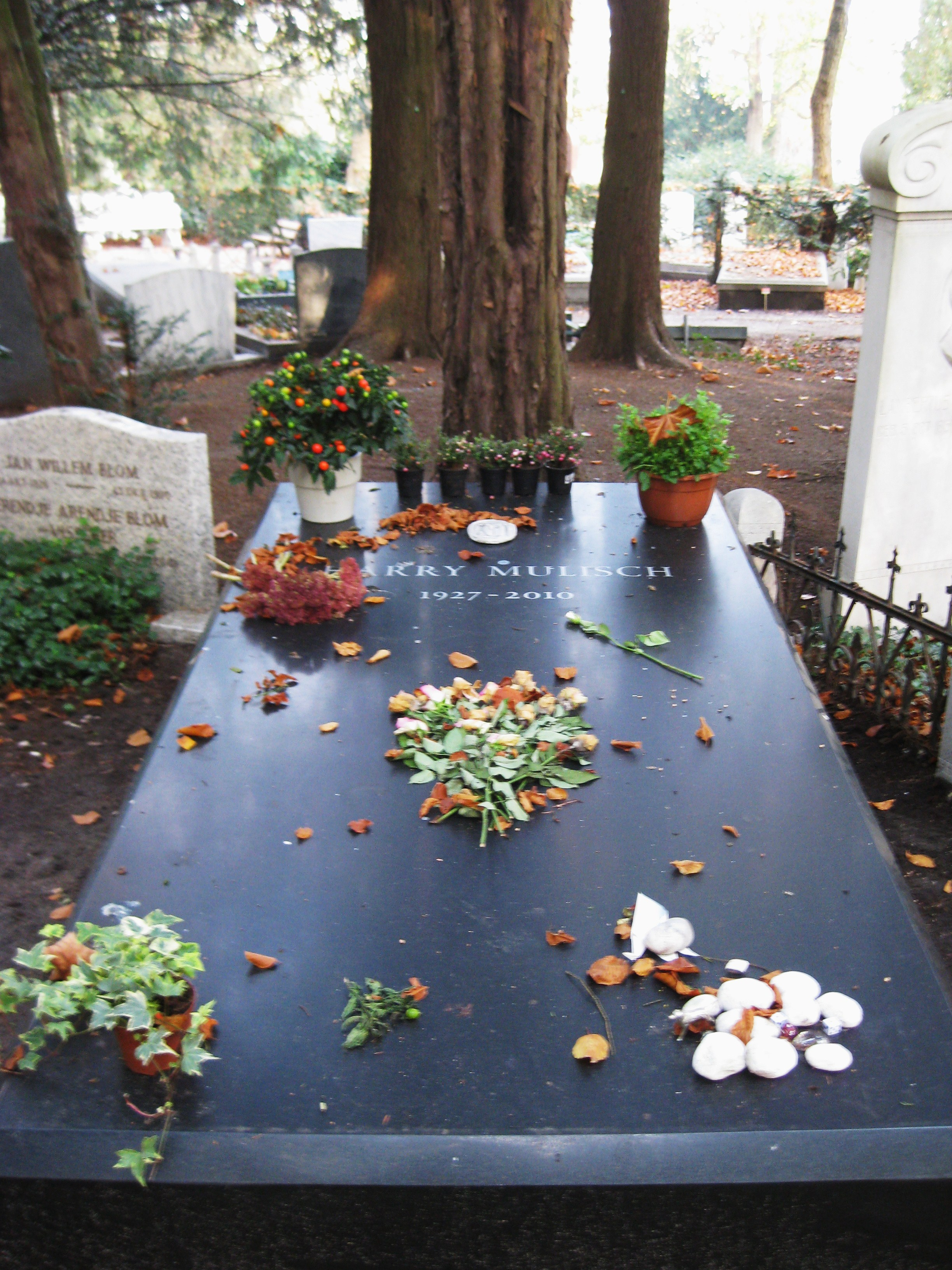
Grave of Harry Mulisch

- Kees Manders, singer, songwriter (1913-1979), removed
- Iva Kostović-Mandick, artist, theatremaker, founder of Theatre Maska i Pokret (1956-2019)
- Fien de la Mar, actress and cabaret performer (1898-1965)
- Cissy van Marxveldt, writer (1898-1948)
- Else Mauhs, actress (1885-1959)
- Rob du Mée, film producer(1935-2003)
- Ischa Meijer, columnist (1943-1995)
- Doeschka Meijsing, writer (1947-2012)
- Erik Menkveld, writer and poet (1959-2014)
- Hans van Mierlo, politician (1931-2010)
- Ben Minoli, actor (1916-1998)
- Frank Mol, composer, pianist (1957-2000)
- Frans Molenaar, fashion designer (1940-2015)
- Conrad Wilhelm Mönnich, theologian (1915-1994)
- Louise de Montel, singer (1926-1993)
- Piet Muijselaar, musical comedy performer (1899-1978)
- Hendrik Mulderije, politician (1896-1970)
- Harry Mulisch, writer (1927-2010)
- Robby Müller, cinematographer (1940-2018)

=== N ===
- Theo Niermeijer, artist (1940-2005)
- Constant Nieuwenhuys, painter with Cobra (1920-2005)
- Jan Nooij, founder Volkstoneel (1888-1962)
- Beppie Nooij jr., actress (1919-1979)
- Beppie Nooij sr., actress (1893-1976)
- Klaas Norel, writer, journalist (1899-1971)

=== O ===
- Wubbo Ockels, physicist and astronaut (1946-2014)
- Jeroen Oerlemans, photographer and war correspondent (1970-2016)
- Piet Ooms, swimmer (1884-1961)
- Adrianus Rutger Ophorst, lieutenant-general (1857-1928)
- Jacobus Oranje, resistance hero (1898-1946)
- Jos Orelio, singer (1854-1926)

=== P ===
- Schelto Patijn, politician (1936-2007)
- Désiré Pauwels, singer (1861-1942)
- François Pauwels, lawyer, writer (1888-1966)
- Tilly Perin-Bouwmeester, actress (1893-1984), removed
- Johan Phaff, journalist (1933-1973)
- Willem Pijper, composer (1894-1947)
- Heleen Pimentel, actress (1916-2008)
- Jan Pierre Plooij, writer (1945-1994)
- Ben Polak, doctor, politician (1913-1993)
- Karel Poons, actor (1912-1992)
- Peter Post, cyclist and directeur sportif (1933-2011)
- Ferdi Posthuma de Boer, painter (1930-1995)
- Jaap van Praag, chairman AFC Ajax (1910-1987)
- Nico Prins, drummer (1924-2003)
- Peter Bilitch, philosopher (1963 - 2010)

=== Q ===
- Israël Querido, writer (1872-1932)

=== R ===
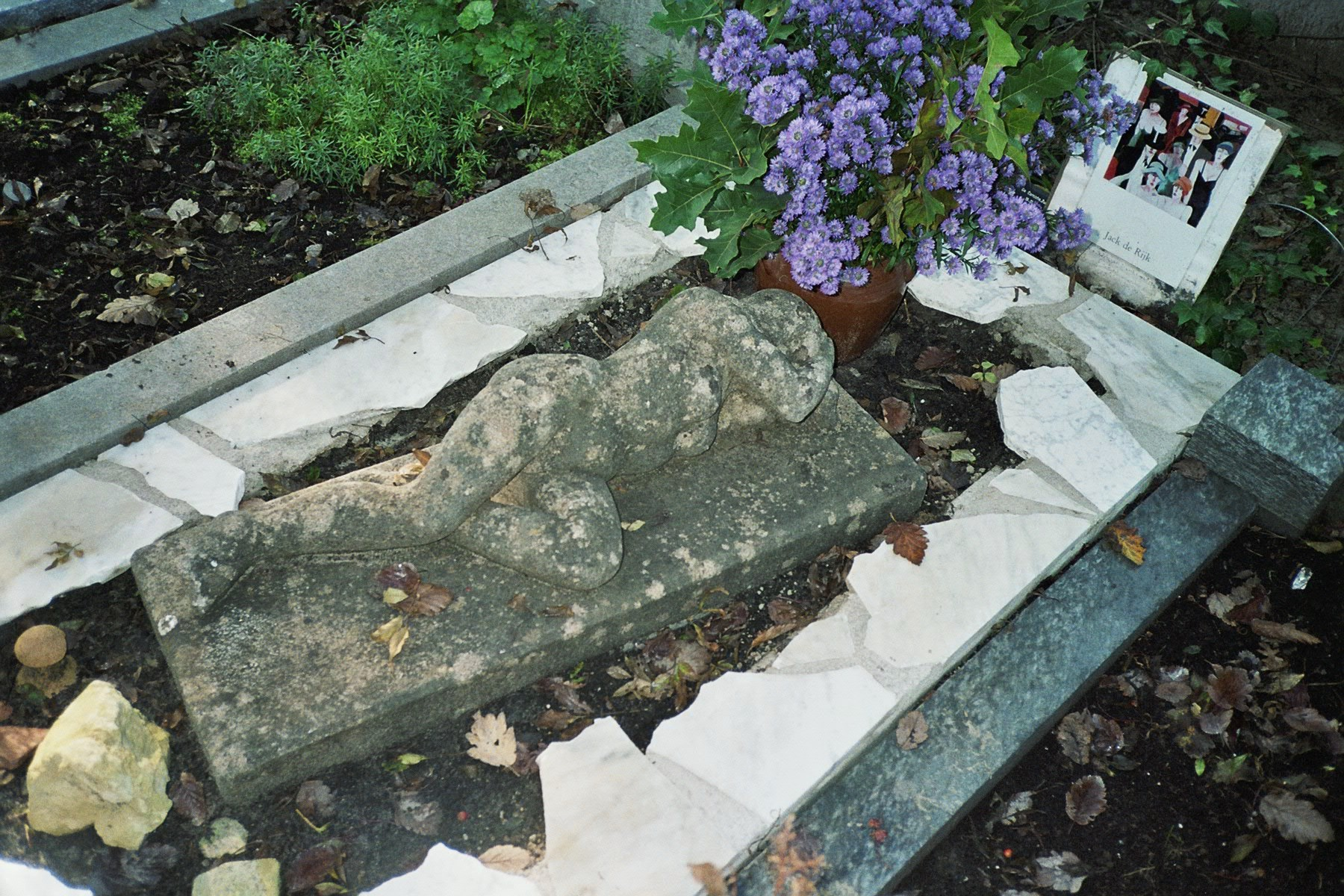
Grave of Jack de Rijk

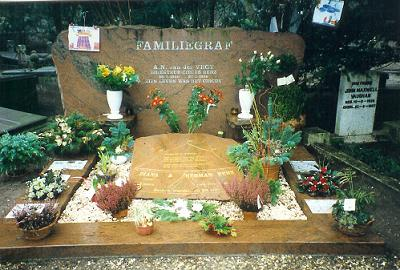
Grave of Herman & Diana Renz

- Roef Ragas, actor (1965-2007)
- Lex de Regt, actor, director (1947-1991)
- Margreet Reiss, writer, translator (1914-2002)
- Joan Remmelts, actor (1905-1987)
- Max Reneman, dentist, musician, artist (1923-1978)
- Catharina Rentmeester, actress, violinist (1890-1973), removed
- Ko Rentmeester, actor (1865-1942), removed
- Herman Renz, circus director (1967-1996)
- Nicolaas Ridderbos, theologian (1910-1981)
- Jack de Rijk, painter (1931-2005)
- Johannis de Rijke, engineer (1843-1913)
- Bart Robbers, politician (D'66) (1941-2015)
- Bob van Rootselaar, mathematician (1927-2006)
- Piet Römer, actor (1928-2012)
- Julius Röntgen, composer (1855-1932)
- Netty Rosenfeld, singer, TV producer (1921-2001)
- George Rosenthal, banker (1828-1909)
- Nico Rost, linguist (1896-1967)
- Guillaume Le Roy, artist (1938-2008)
- Renate Rubinstein, writer, journalist (1929-1990)
- Louise Ruys, actress (1925-2008)
- Michiel de Ruyter, jazz musician (1926-1994)

=== S ===
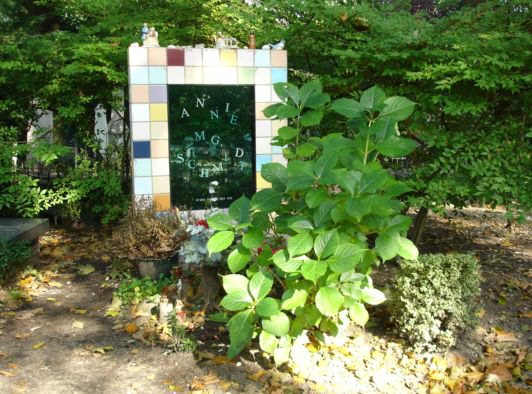
Grave of Annie M.G. Schmidt

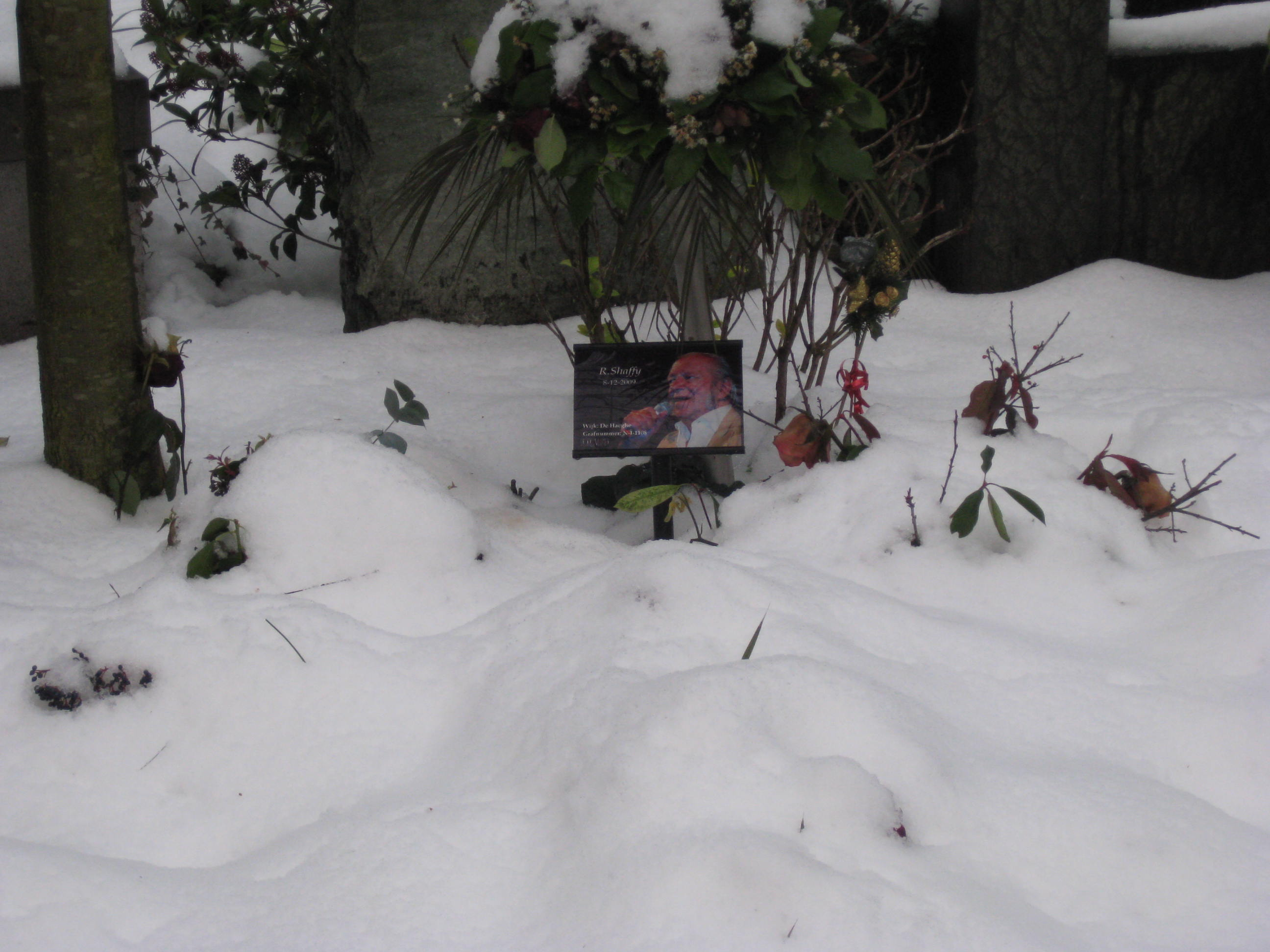
Grave of Ramses Shaffy

- Mady Saks, film director (1941-2006)
- Helmut Salden, graphic designer (1910-1996)
- Piet Salomons, water polo player (1924-1948), removed
- Willem van de Sande Bakhuyzen, director (1957-2005)
- Vic Savelkoul, artist (1925-1999)
- Jan Schaefer, politician (1940-1994)
- Dirk Schäfer, pianist, composer (1873-1931)
- Flip van der Schalie, TV producer (1923-1999)
- Marina Schapers, actress (1938-1981)
- Peter Schat, composer (1935-2003)
- Arthur van Schendel, writer (1874-1946)
- Frits Schiller, hotelier of Hotel Schiller and painter (1886-1971)
- Annie M.G. Schmidt, writer (1911-1995)
- Wim Schokking, politician (1900-1960)
- Bob Scholte, singer (1902-1983)
- Max Schuhmacher, antiquarian (1927-2007)
- Ramses Shaffy, singer, actor (1933-2009)
- Karel Sijmons, architect (1907-1989)
- Sander Simons, TV news anchor (1962-2010)
- Joop Sjollema, painter (1900-1990)
- René Sleeswijk sr., theater producer (1907-1978)
- Riny van Slingelandt, actress (1920-2007)
- Dick Slootweg, journalist (1946-1992)
- Wies Smals, founder of De Appel (1939-1983)
- Mathieu Smedts, journalist, writer, chief editor of Vrij Nederland (1913-1996)
- Henk Smit, singer (1932-2010)
- Joke Smit, feminist (1933-1981)
- Liesje Smolders, artist (1952-2008)
- Hans Snoek, founder of Scapino Ballet (1910-2001)
- Piet Soer, pilot of The Pelican (1903-1935)
- Mela Soesman, actress (1914-2005)
- Sjoerd Wilhelm Soeters, KLM pilot (1919-1947)
- Frans van de Staak, film maker (1943-2001)
- Willy Stähle, water skier (1954-2015)
- Joost Sternheim, journalist (1951-1992)
- Rob Stolk, printer (1946-2001)
- Dé Stoop, president of FC Amsterdam (1919-2007)
- Coba Surie, painter (1879-1970)
- Henny de Swaan-Roos, feminist (1912-1995)
- Theo Swagemakers, painter (1898-1994)
- Hans van Sweeden, composer (1939-1963)

=== T ===
- Paul Termos, composer, saxophone player (1952-2003)
- Mari Ternooy Apel, actor
- Gerard Thoolen, actor (1943-1996)
- Anton Tierie, composer (1870-1938)
- George August Tindal, sailor (1839-1921)
- Joop van Tijn, journalist (1938-1997)
- Bob van Tol, actor (1943-2005)
- Oscar Tourniaire, actor (1880-1939)

=== U ===
- Jean Ummels, screenwriter (1956-2007)
- Maurits Uyldert, writer (1881-1966)

=== V ===
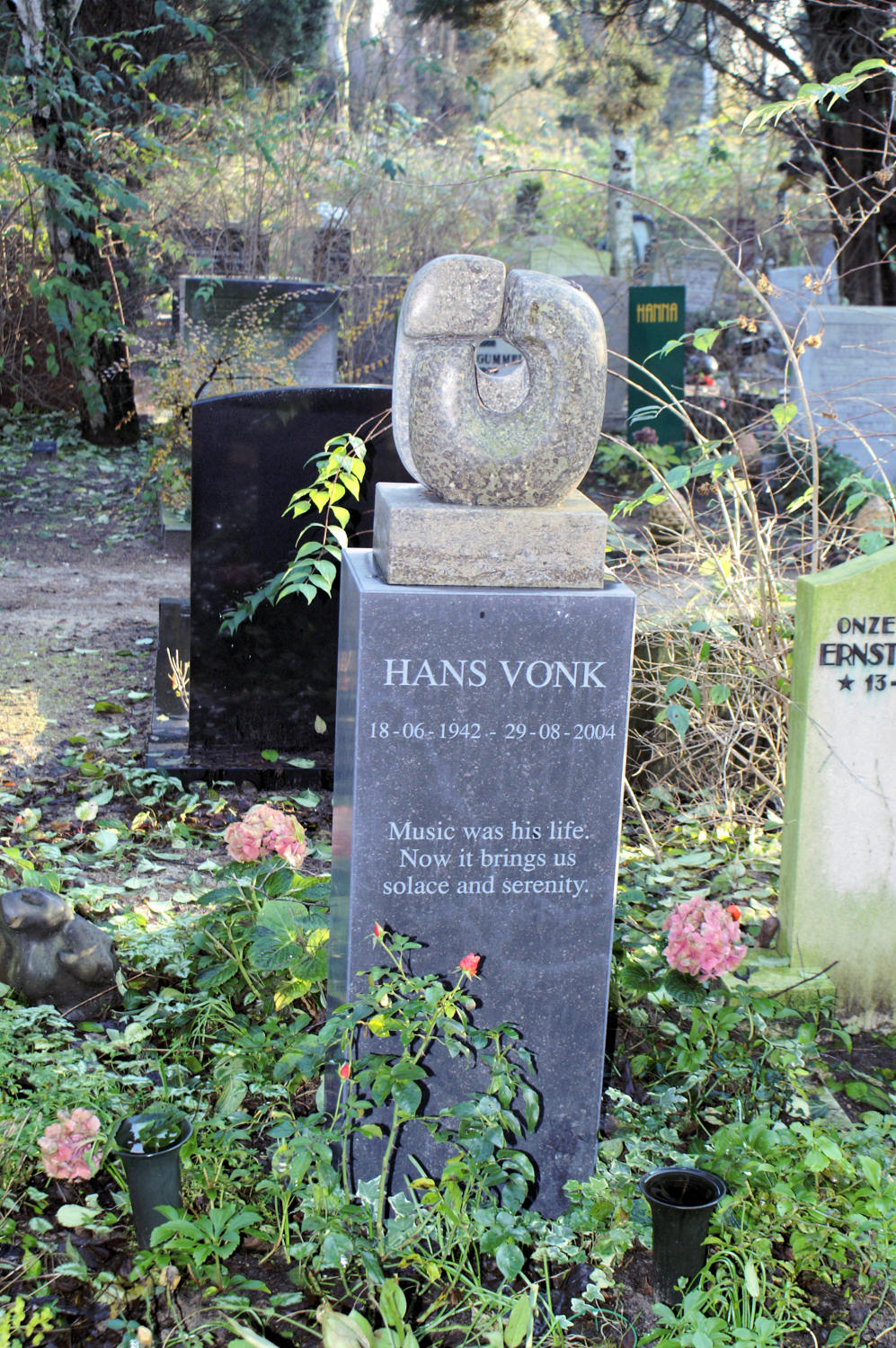
Grave of Hans Vonk

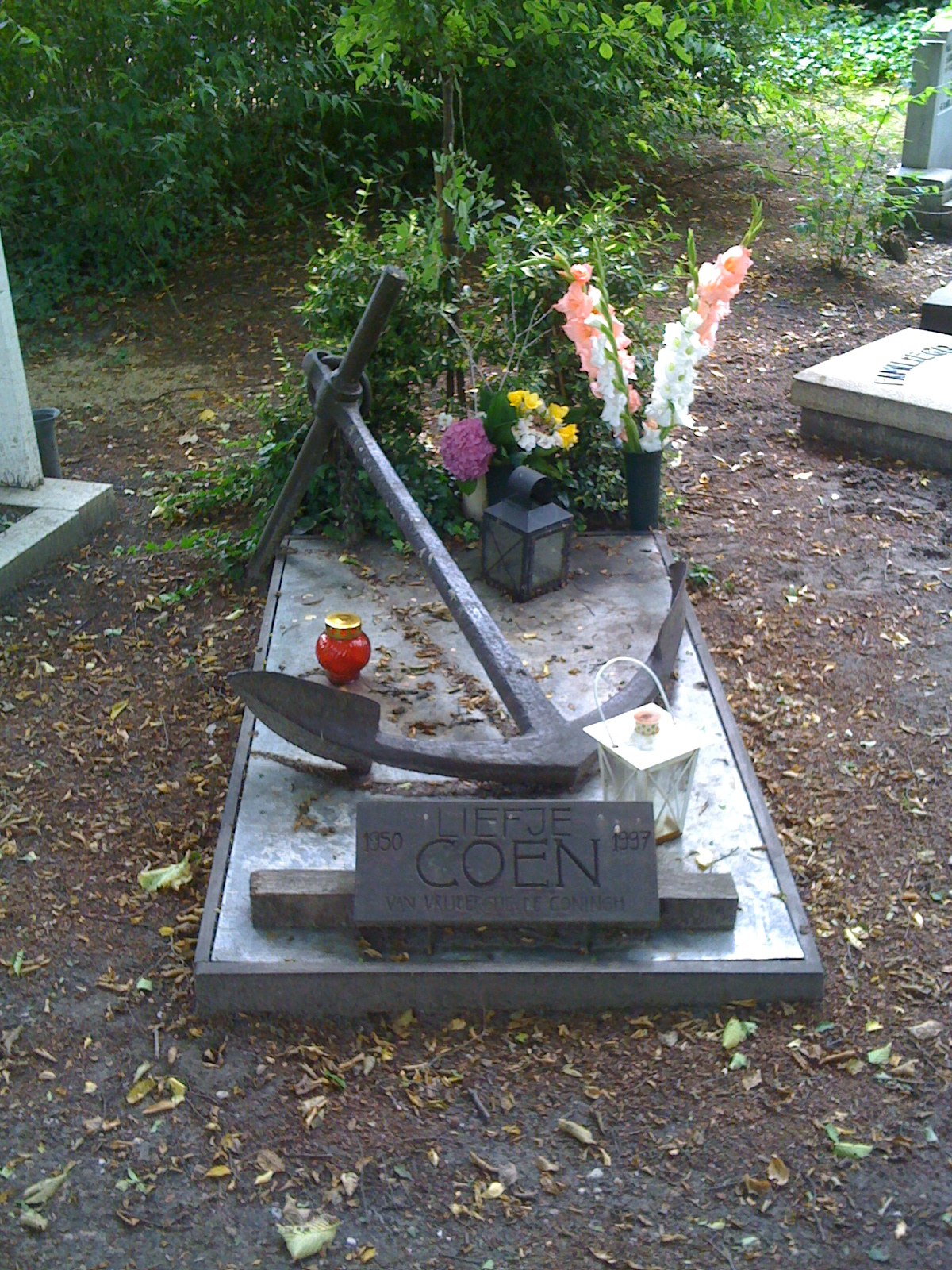
Grave of Coen van Vrijberghe de Coningh

- M. Vasalis, poet (1909-1998)
- Adriaan Venema, writer (1941-1993)
- Felix Andries Vening Meinesz, geophysicist (1887-1966)
- Gerrard Verhage, director (1948-2008)
- Marco Vermie, actor (1959-1996)
- Elisabeth Versluys, actress (1923-2011)
- Dolf Verspoor, poet (1917-1994)
- Gerrit Versteeg, architect (1871-1938)
- Victor IV, artist (1929-1986)
- Henk Vink, race driver (1938-1988)
- Jo Vischer sr., actor (1891-1966)
- Geert Vissers, artist (1960-1992)
- Bert Voeten, poet (1918-1992)
- Hans Vonk, conductor (1942-2004)
- Frans Vorstman, actor (1922-2011)
- Ton Vos, actor (1923-1991)
- Corstiaan de Vries, artist (1936-2008)
- Erik de Vries, television pioneer (1912-2004)
- Henri de Vries, actor (1864-1949)
- Sophie de Vries jr., actress (1873-1961)
- Sophie de Vries sr., actress (1839-1892)
- Gerard de Vries Lentsch, ship builder(1916-1996)
- Victor E. van Vriesland, poet (1892-1974)
- Coen van Vrijberghe de Coningh, actor (1950-1997)

=== W ===
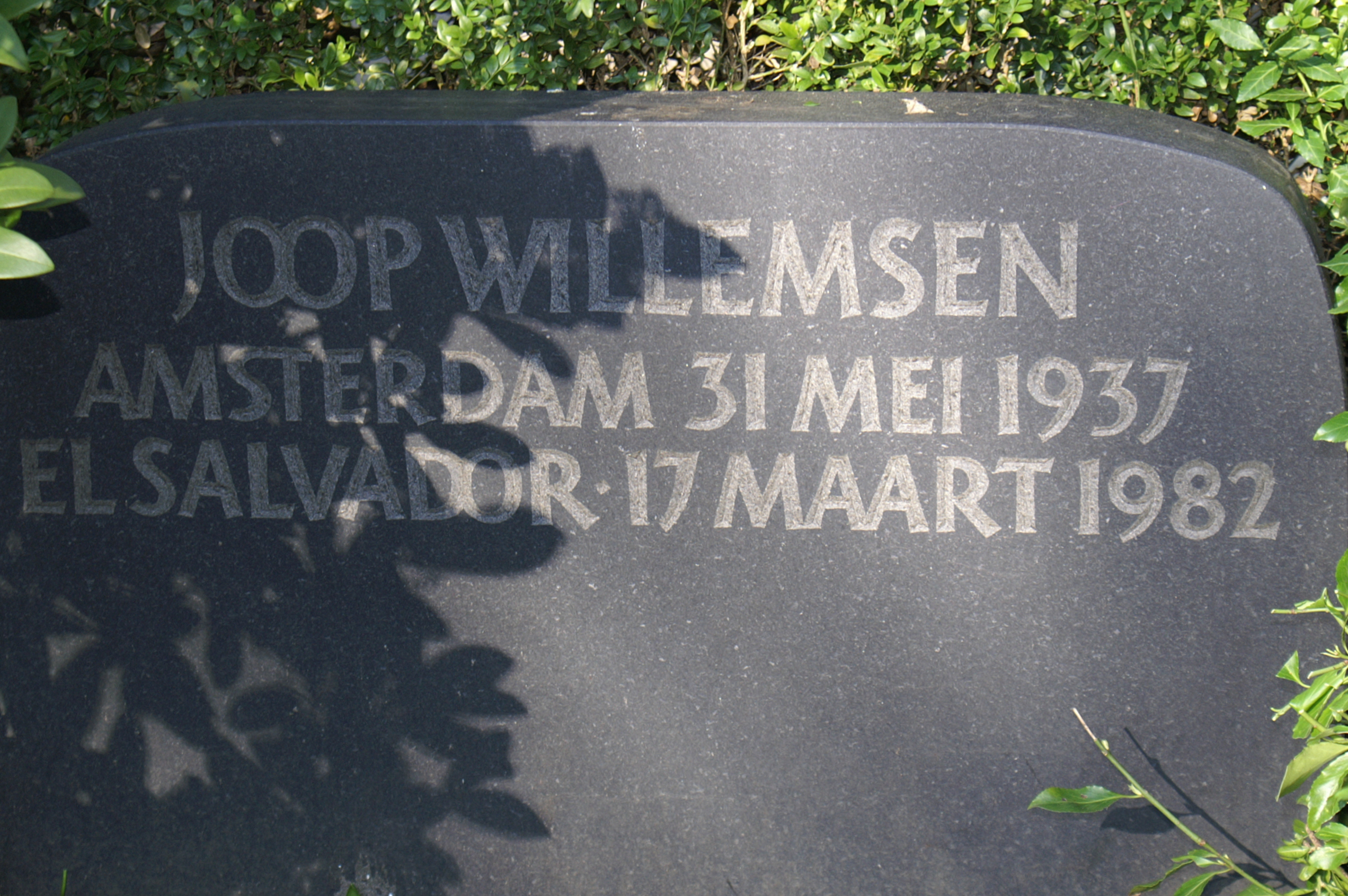
Grave of Joop Willemsen

- Johannes Diderik van der Waals Jr., scientist (1873-1971)
- Feike Obbes van der Wal, typographer, union leader (1873-1937)
- Jan Waterink, psychologist (1890-1966)
- J.W.F. Werumeus Buning, poet (1891-1958)
- Koen Wessing, photographer (1942-2011)
- Grard Westendorp, writer, behavioral scientist (1948-2001)
- Helene Weyel, writer (1951-1995)
- Han Wezelaar, sculptor (1901-1984)
- Harry Wich, scenic designer, painter (1927-2002)
- Erich Wichmann, visual artist (1890-1929)
- Bernard Willem Wierink, artist (1856-1939)
- Thaeke Wiersma, pilot of the Ooievaar (1898-1931)
- Nicolaas Wijnberg, painter (1918-2006)
- Bab Wijsman, actor (1910-2000)
- Jan Hillebrand Wijsmuller, painter (1855-1925)
- Joop Willemsen, journalist (1937-1982)
- Carel Willink, painter (1900-1983)
- Kees Winkler, poet (1927-2004)
- Willem Wittkampf, journalist, writer (1924-1992), removed
- Henk van Woerden, writer, painter (1947-2005)

=== Z ===
- André van Zandbergen, actor (1911-1999)
- Bram Zeegers, lawyer (1949-2007)
- Jan van Zutphen, founder Zonnestraal (1863-1958)

== Photos ==
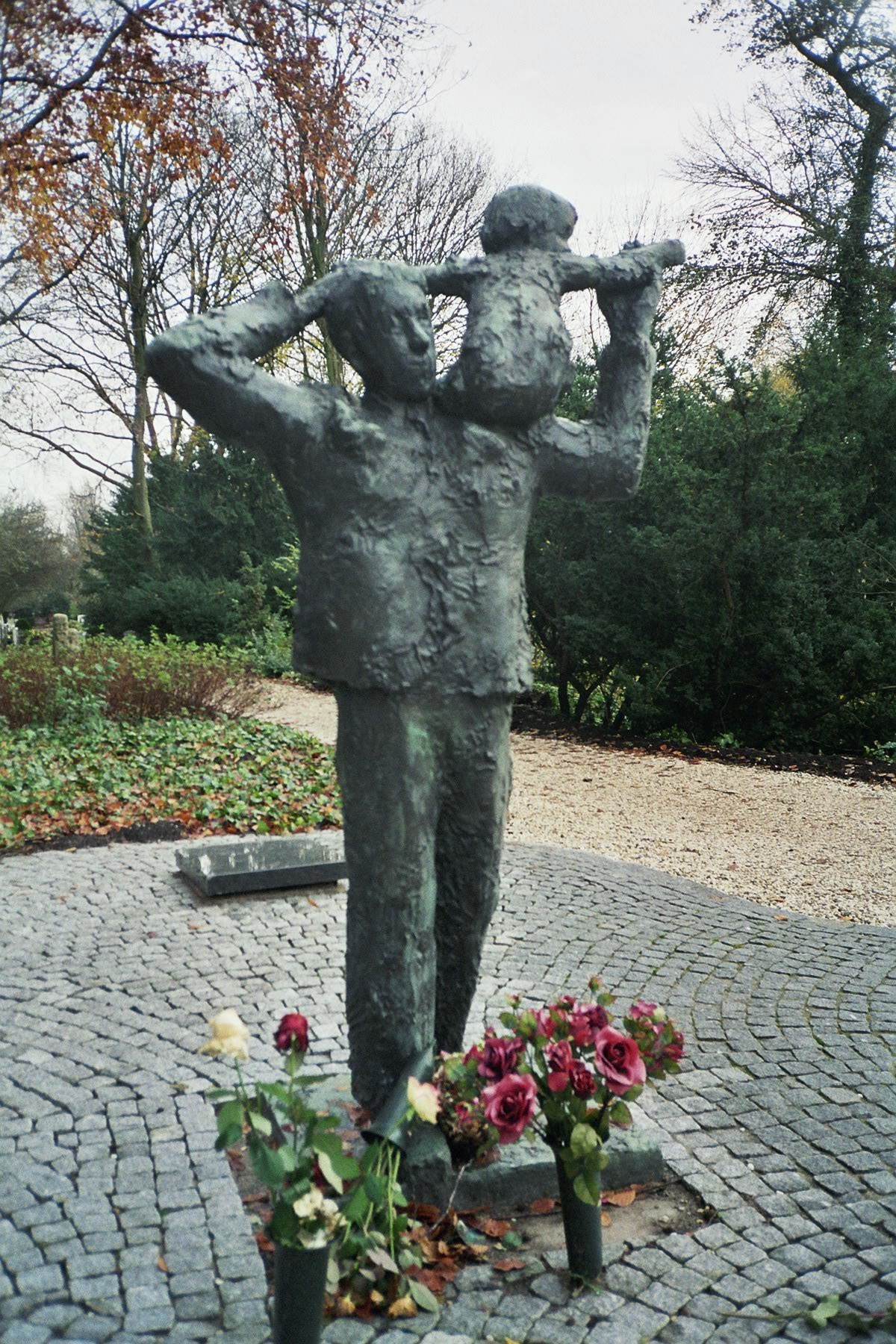
Vadermonument

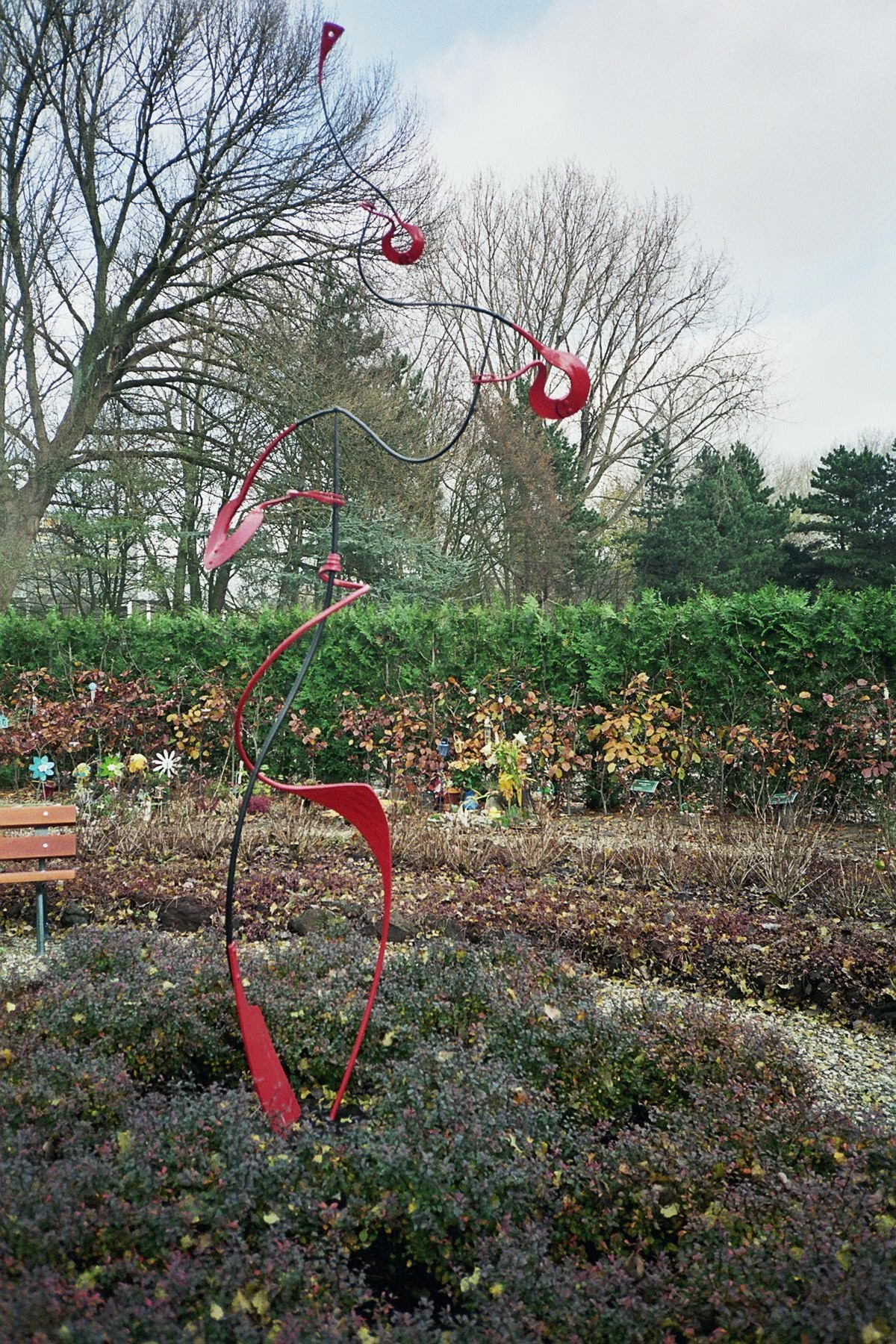
Kinderhofje

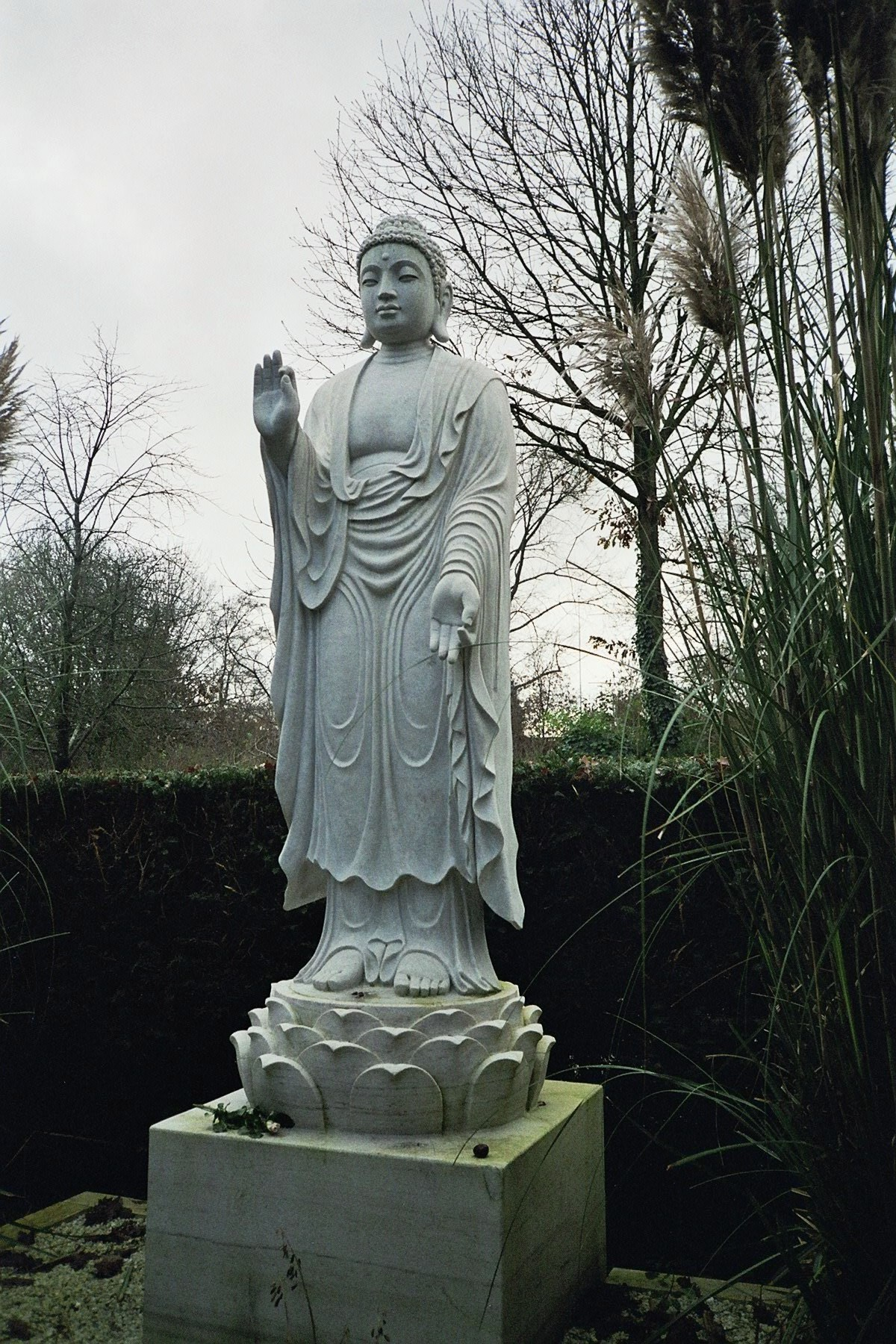
Boeddha

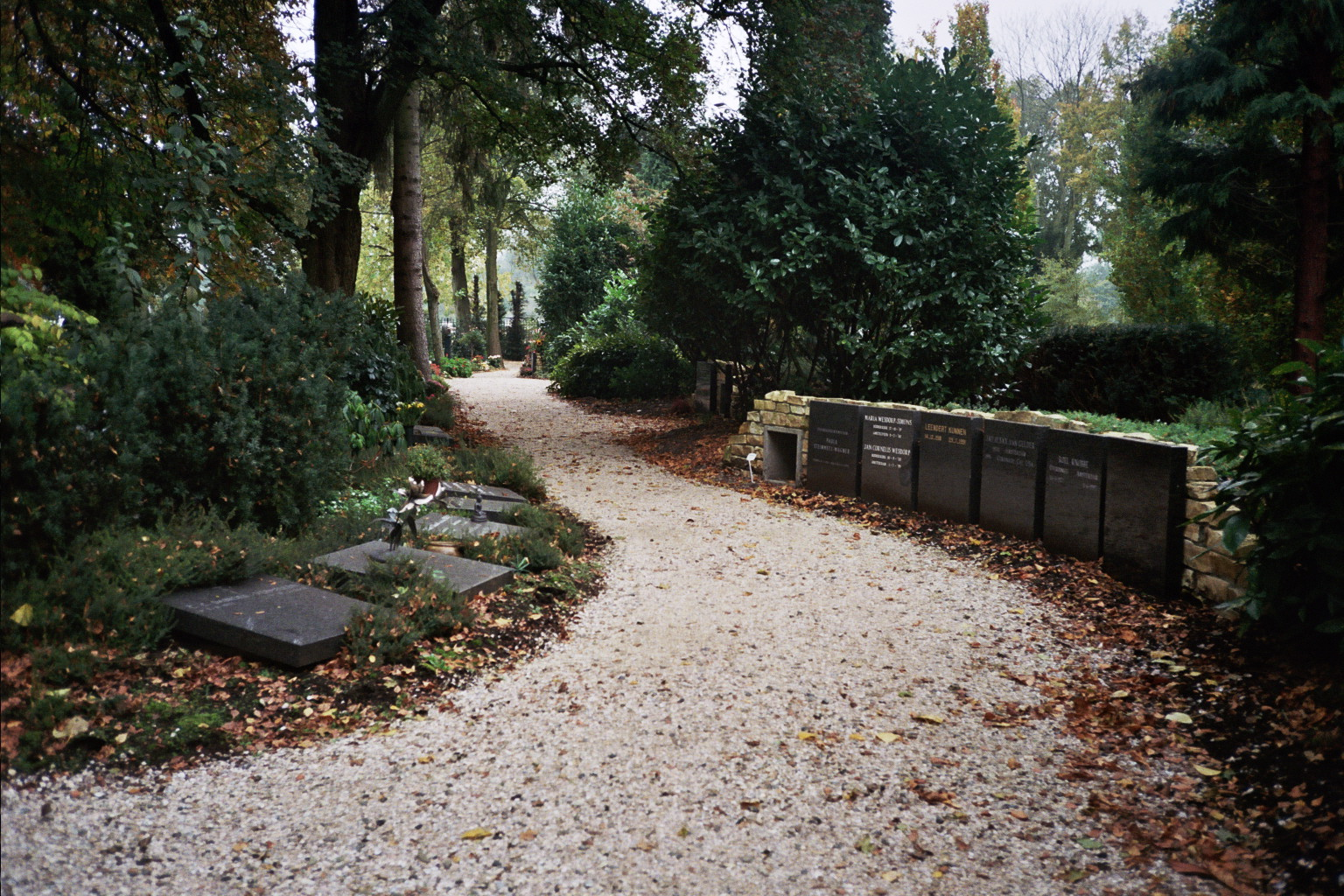
Urnengraven

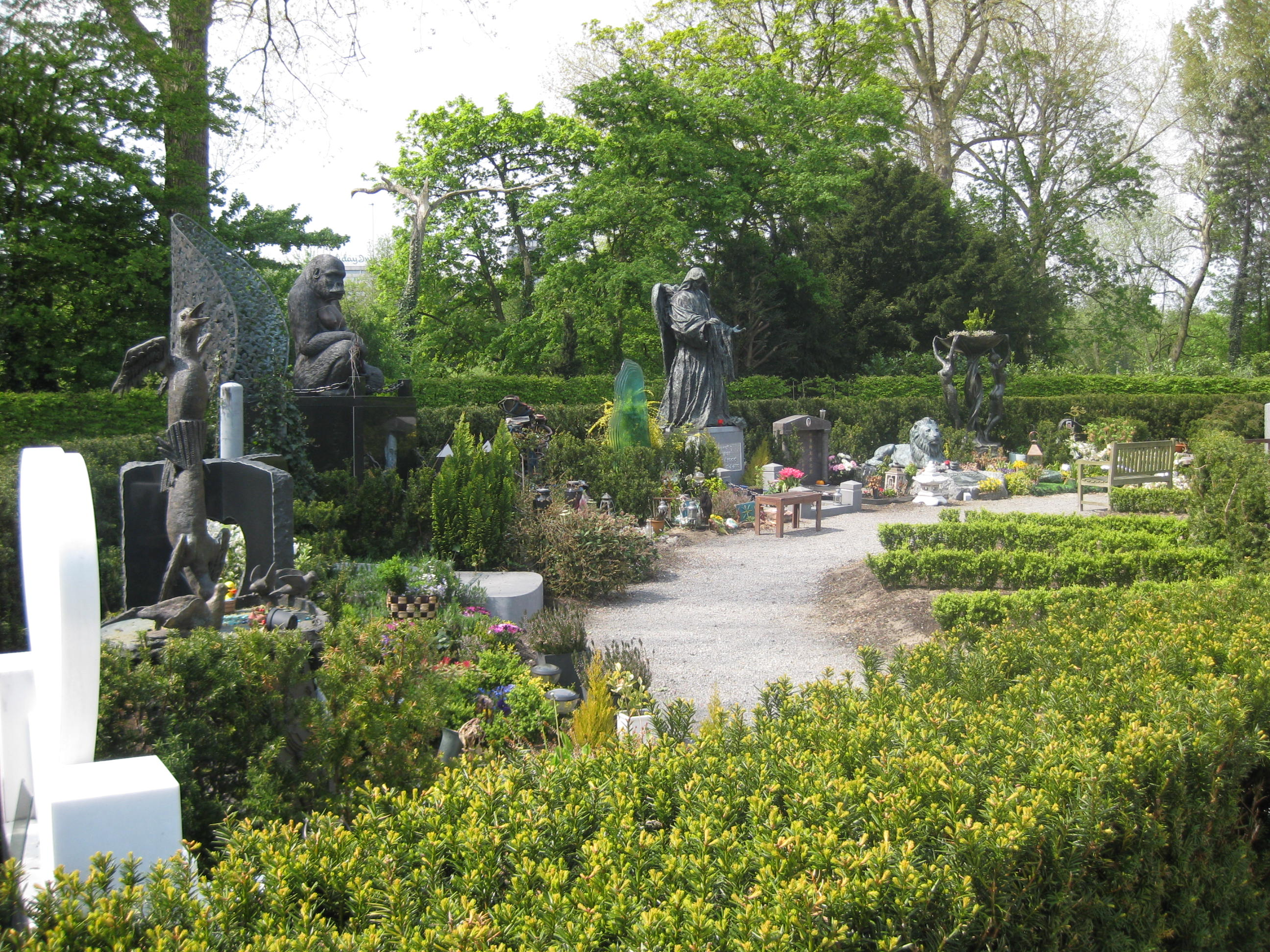
"Paradiso"

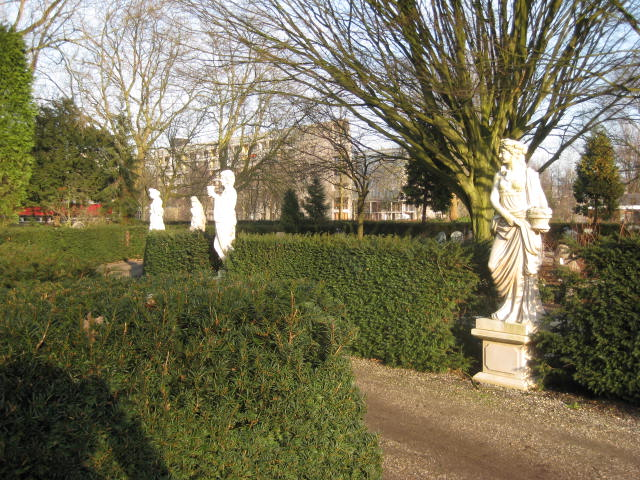
Mythologische beelden bij "De Traen"

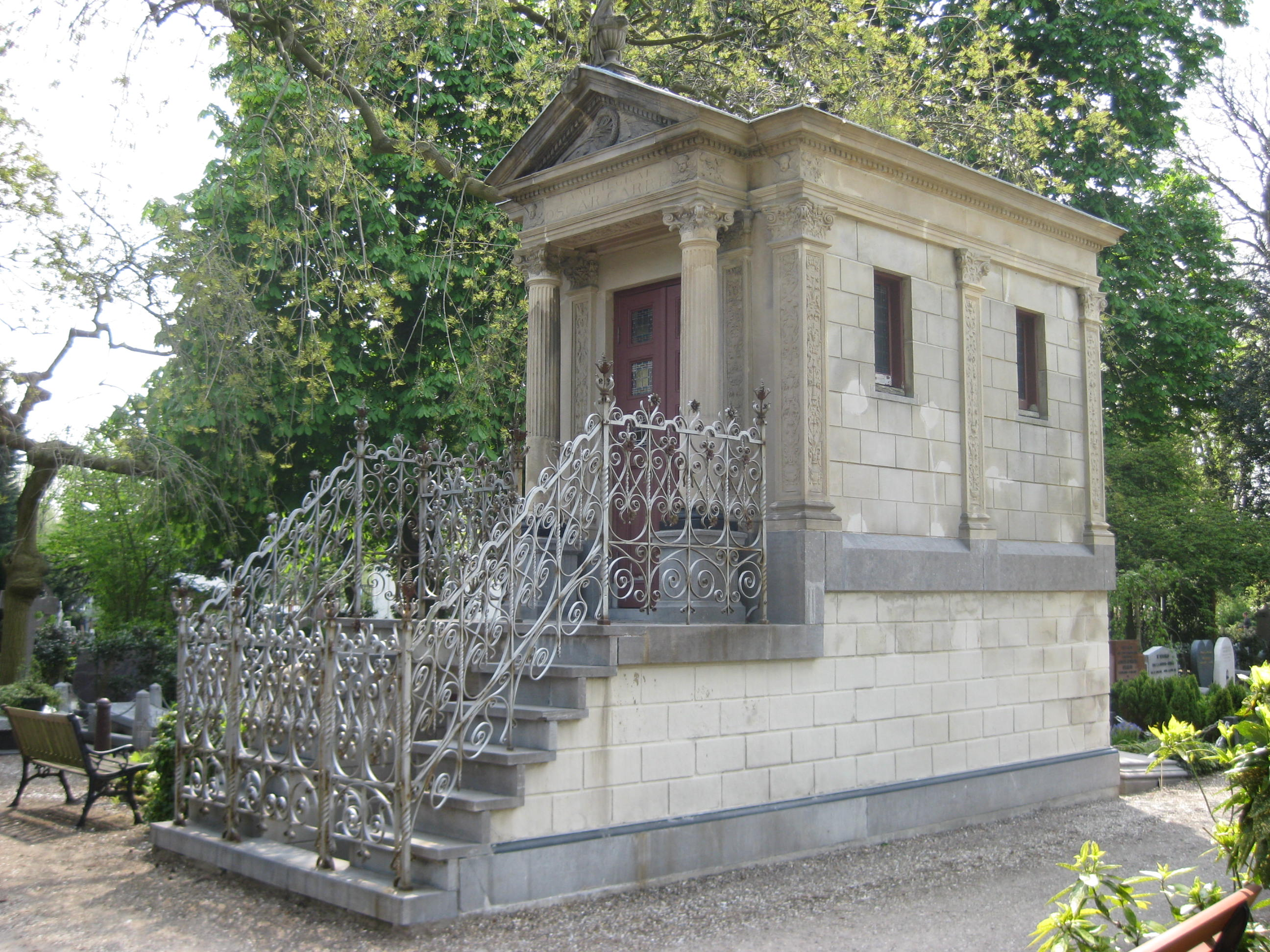
Oscar Carré 1891 mausoleum (Rijksmonument)

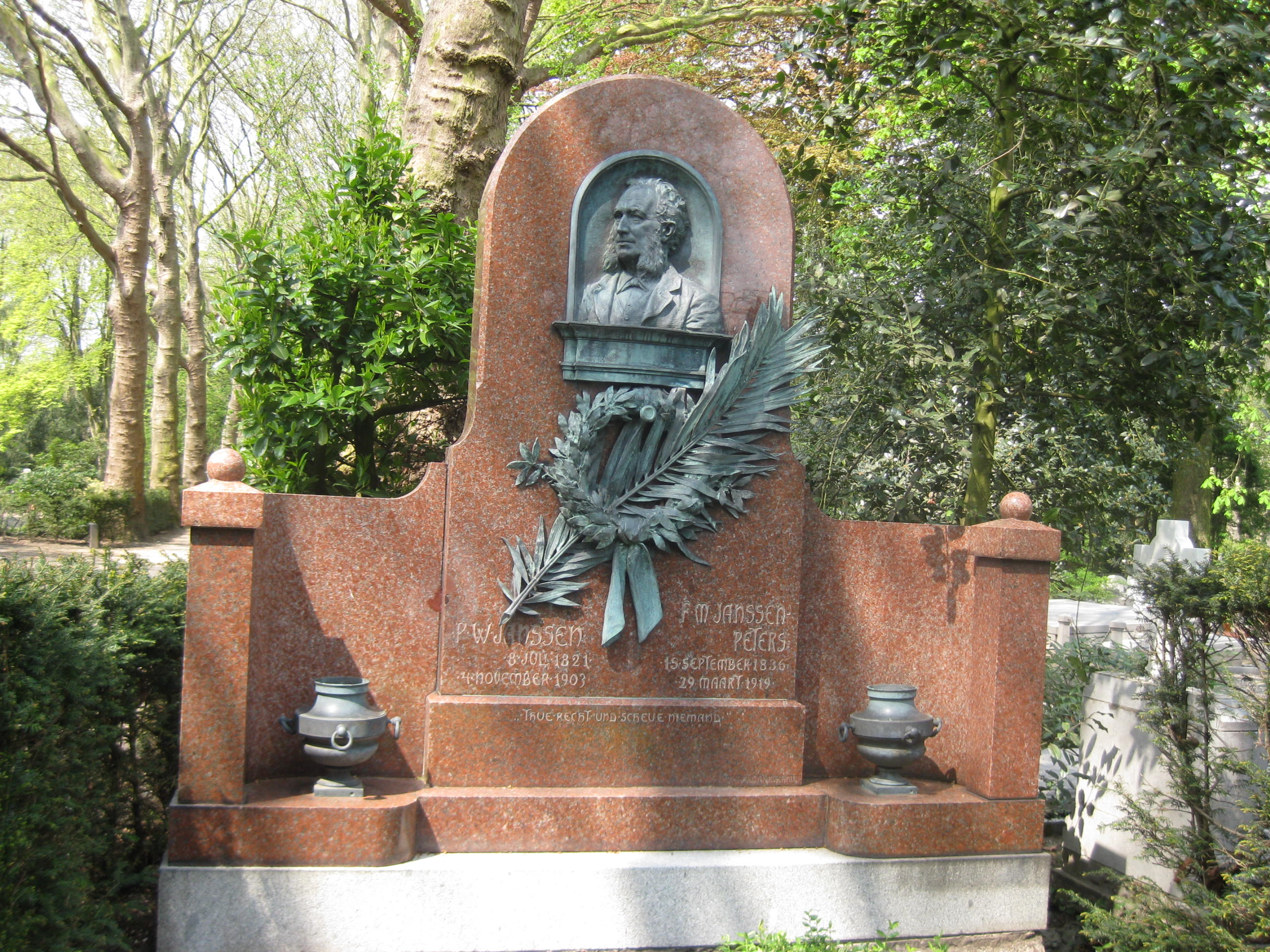
P.W. Janssen 1906 monument (Rijksmonument)
