= Hellen Huisman =

Dutch voice actress

- Born: March 26, 1937; Amsterdam, Netherlands
- Died: January 29, 2012 (aged 74); Blaricum, North Holland, Netherlands
- Occupation: Voice actress

Hellen Huisman (26 March 1937, in Amsterdam – 29 January 2012, in Blaricum) was a voice actor who did voiceover work on Sesamstraat, the Dutch co-production of Sesame Street. Hellen originated the Dutch voice of Prairie Dawn, and has done the voice-over of other girls on the show from 1976 to the 2000s. She is buried at Zorgvlied cemetery.
