= Wilhelmina van der Horst-van der Lugt Melsert =

Dutch actress (1871–1928)

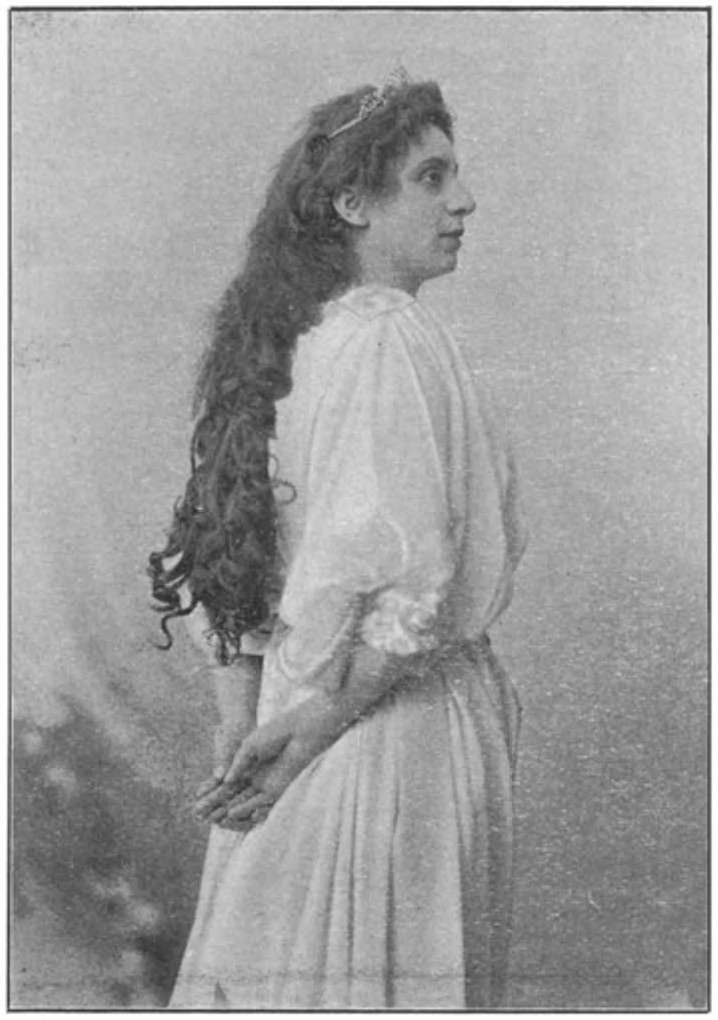
- van der Horst-van der Lugt Melsert in 1899
- Born: Wilhelmina Elisabeth Jacoba van der Lugt Melsert; 24 February 1871; The Hague, The Netherlands
- Died: 21 March 1928 (aged 57); Amsterdam, The Netherlands
- Resting place: Zorgvlied
- Occupation: actress
- Spouse: Adriaan van der Horst

Wilhelmina Elisabeth Jacoba van der Horst-van der Lugt Melsert (24 February 1871 – 21 March 1928) was a Dutch actress. She performed at the Rotterdamse Schouwburg and later became a leading actress at the Royal Dutch Theatre.

== Biography ==
Wilhelmina van der Lugt Melsert was born on 24 February 1871 in The Hague. She was the sister of the stage actor Cor van der Lugt Melsert.

She married the actor and director Adriaan van der Horst. The two had met while both working for Alex Faassen & Co. at the Rotterdamse Schouwburg. They also both performed together Willem Royaards' Het Toneel. Following her husband's appointment as co-director, with Louis Bertrijn, of Royal Dutch Theatre in Antwerp in 1909, she became their lead actress.

In 1919, her husband founded Het Schouwtooneel with Jan Musch, where she played several leading roles.

Van der Lugt Melsert died in 1928 and was buried at Zorgvlied in Amsterdam.
