= Gert-Jan Dröge =

Dutch television presenter (1943–2007)

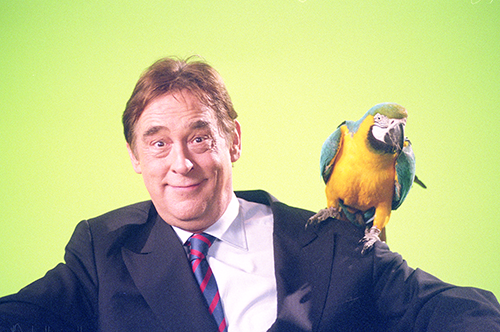
Gert-Jan Dröge in 1999

Gerardus Johannes Henri (Gert-Jan) Dröge (23 April 1943, in Enschede – 5 June 2007, in Amsterdam) was a Dutch television presenter, producer, actor, journalist and writer who mainly became known for his society programme Glamourland on AVRO television. He was noted for his satirical approach on the show.

In the 1980s, he managed the discotheque Richter in Amsterdam, which became nationally known as the location of RUR, the first late night talk show on Dutch television.

He died from lung cancer and his ashes were buried at Zorgvlied cemetery.
