= Betty Holtrop-van Gelder =

Dutch actress and writer (1866–1962)

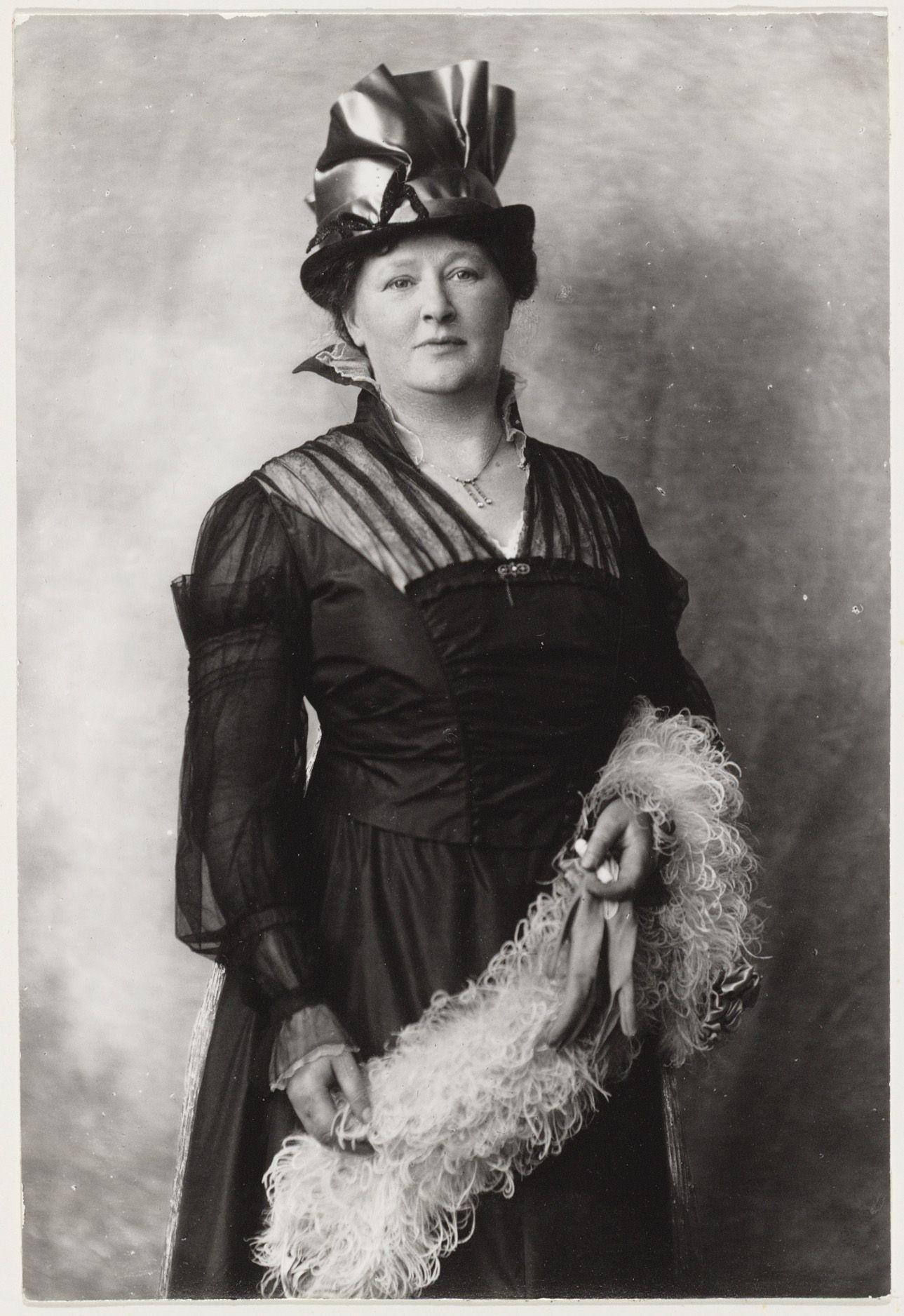
- A 1917 photograph of Betty Holtrop-van Gelder by Jacob Merkelbach
- Born: Elisabeth Philippina Brouwenstijn; 16 December 1866; Amsterdam
- Died: 20 October 1962; Haarlem
- Occupation: Actress

Betty Holtrop-van Gelder (16 December 1866 – 20 October 1962) was a Dutch actress and teacher.

== Early life ==
Elisabeth Philippina Brouwenstijn was born in Amsterdam, the daughter of Beatrix Brouwenstijn and Philip Jacob van Gelder.

== Career ==
Betty van Gelder made her stage debut in 1886, at the Grand Théâtre. She was associated for thirty years with the Koninklijke Vereeniging Het Nederlandsch Tooneel (KVHNT, the Royal Society of the Dutch Theatre), as an actress and as a teacher. she was known for classical, Shakespearean, and modern roles. She gave a lecture at a women's labor conference which was published as a monograph, De vrouw aan het tooneel (The Woman on the Stage, 1899). In 1915 she was listed as an active supporter of the Women's International League for Peace and Freedom, when it held its world's congress at The Hague.

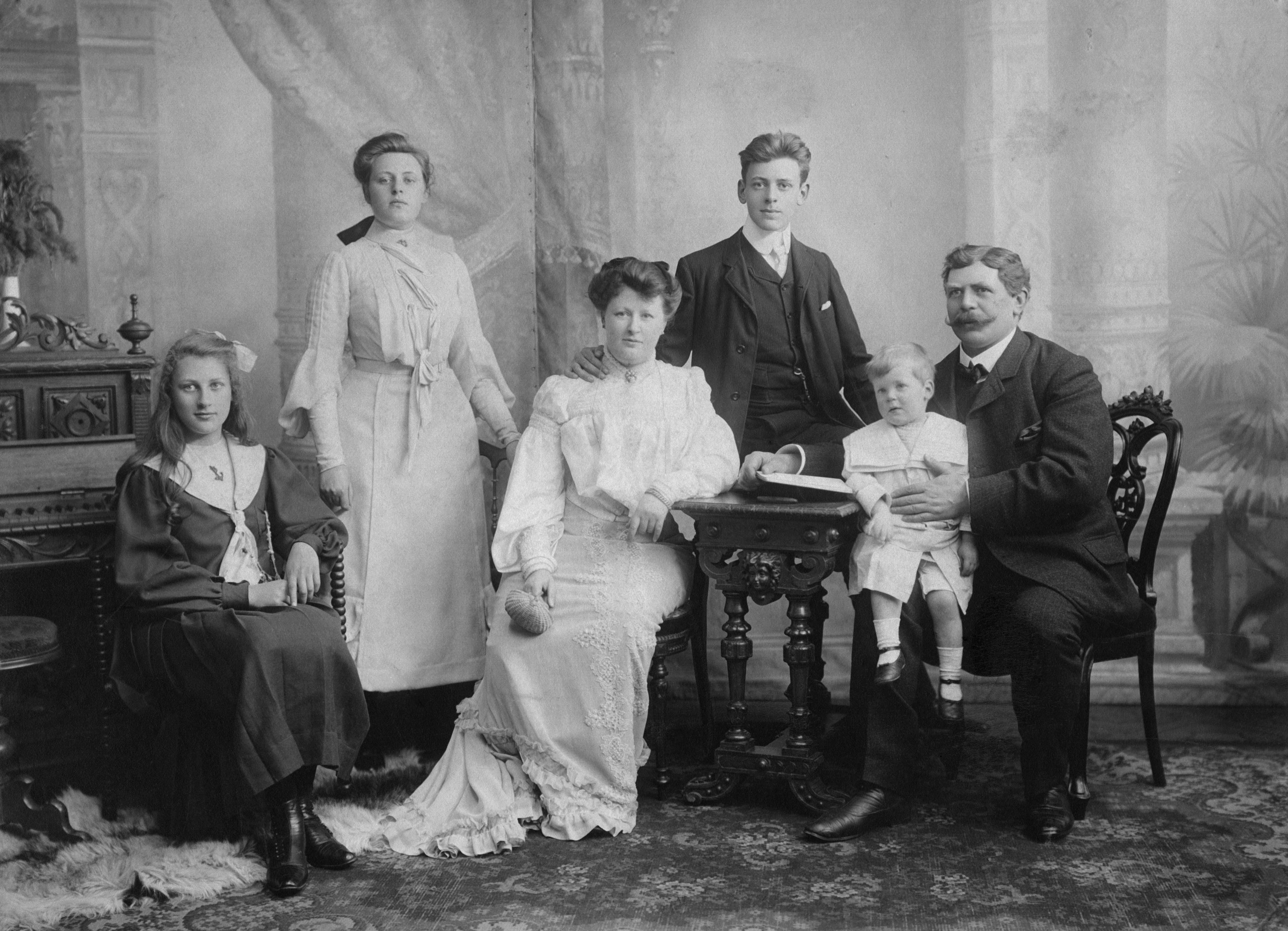
Family portret (1905)

== Personal life ==
Betty van Gelder married actor and director Jan Arend Holtrop in 1887. He died in 1917. They had four children. Their daughter Marie Holtrop became an actress, and their son Marius Holtrop was a diplomat and president of De Nederlandsche Bank. Betty Holtrop-van Gelder died in 1962, aged 95 years, in Haarlem. Her grave is in Zorgvlied Cemetery.

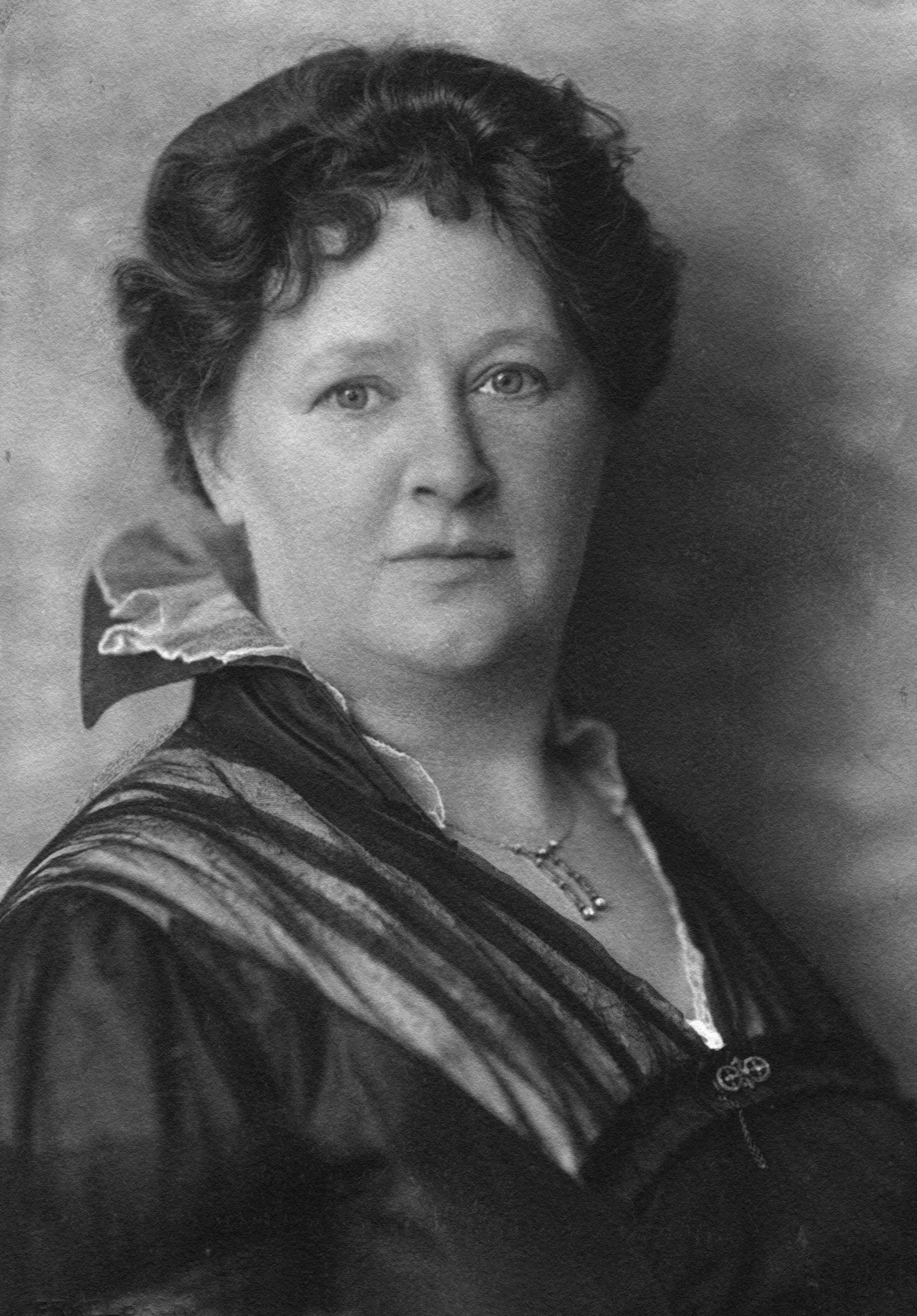
