= Milo Anstadt =

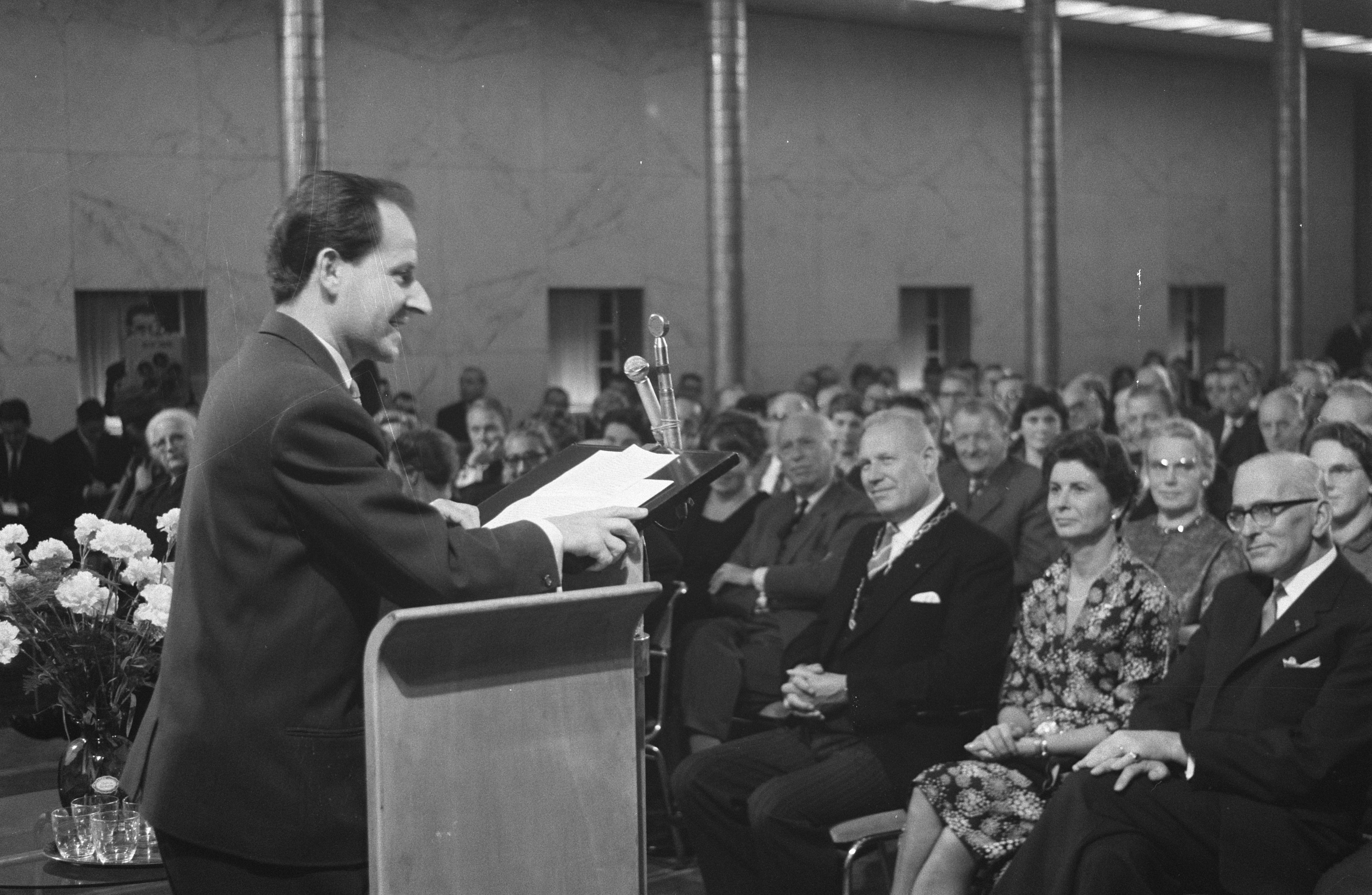
- Anstadt in 1960
- Born: 10 July 1920; Lwów, Poland
- Died: 16 July 2011 (aged 91); Amsterdam, Netherlands

Samuel Marek "Milo" Anstadt (10 July 1920 – 16 July 2011) was a Dutch Jewish writer and journalist.

== Biography ==
Anstadt was born and lived in Lwów (Poland, nowadays Lviv in Ukraine) until 1930. At the age of 10, Milo, his parents and sister Sera emigrated to the Netherlands. In the Netherlands, he completed primary school but did not go to secondary school.

When Anstadt was fourteen years old, he worked for the Transformatorenfabriek Besra in Amsterdam, he often went to ANSKI a cultural club for mostly Jewish eastern European immigrants where you could assist at political and other lectures and all kind of performances, where he also received mentoring and was helped to become more spiritually developed. Later, he received a master's degree in law from the University of Amsterdam, specializing in criminology.

In 1941, he married Lydia Bleiberg, and they had a daughter Irka in March 1942. After a warning in the evening of 9 July 1942, they had to go immediately into hiding. Their daughter was taken afterwards to a foster family in Beverwijk by the Resistance.

From 1945 to 1950, he was an editor of the magazine Vrij Nederland. Next, he worked as a journalist with the Dutch Radio Union, and wrote the spoken parts of 1955 documentary programs for television such as In, Televisierechtbank, Spiegel der Kunsten (Mirror of Arts) and De bezetting (Occupation). For the latter two, he received the 1960 Television Award of the Prince Bernhard Foundation. In 1960, he was commissioned by Wereldvenster Publishing to write a book about Poland. It was published in 1962 under the title Polen, land, volk, cultuur.

As an employee of NRC Handelsblad, Anstadt wrote a large number of opinion articles. In 1994, he was invested as a Knight of the Order of Orange-Nassau. He died in Amsterdam and is buried at Zorgvlied cemetery.

== Bibliography ==
=== Works ===
- Polen, land, volk, cultuur
- Op zoek naar een mentaliteit
- Met de rede der wanhoop
- Kind in Polen
- Polen en Joden
- Jonge jaren
- De verdachte oorboog
- Servië en het westen
- En de romans De opdracht
- Is Nederland veranderd?

=== Novels ===
- Niets gaat voorbij
- De wankele rechtsgang van Albert Kranenburg
