= Theatre Maska i Pokret =

Theatre in Sarajevo, Bosnia and Herzegovina

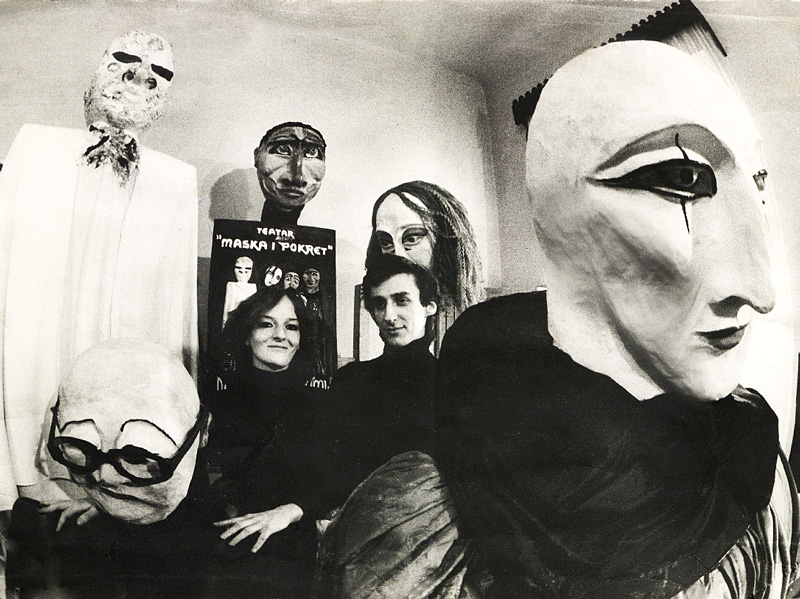
The founders of Theatre Maska i Pokret, Iva Kostović-Mandick and Petar Mandick among characters/masks from the play "Somebody has killed the Play". Sarajevo, 1980.

Theatre Maska i Pokret is a theatre in Bosnia and Herzegovina, founded by Iva Kostović-Mandick and Petar Mandick in Sarajevo in 1980. The main characteristic of this theatre is the belief in the poetic essence of theatre, not using the language of words but what is at the very core of the theatre's origin - mask, music, movement. The theatre is included in The World Encyclopedia of Contemporary Theatre - Europe.

== Performances ==
In the course of three years from 1980 to 1983, four plays were written, created, and produced.

- "Somebody has killed the Play" – one-act play with masks
- "Mme Leopoldine’s Memoires" - one-act play with masks
- "Overture for a Requiem" - one-act play with masks
- "The Blue Flower Fairy Tale" – performance with masks for children

== Awards ==
22 MESS Festival of Small and Experimental Stages of Yugoslavia for the play "Somebody has killed the play"

- Theatre critics, dramaturges and theatre scholars Award for the most appropriate and the most important production of the Festival
- "Tree Gold Stars", a traditional VEN award for "the most thoughtful experiment"

XV International Theatre Festival, Sitges Barcelona for the play "Mme Leopoldine’s Memoires"

- Cau Ferrat Award for masterful use of the mask and the aesthetic value of the play

3 Biennale of Yugoslavian Puppetry, Bugojno for the performance "The Blue Flower Fairy Tale"

- Gold Badge, Jury Award
