= Cornelis Kruyswijk =

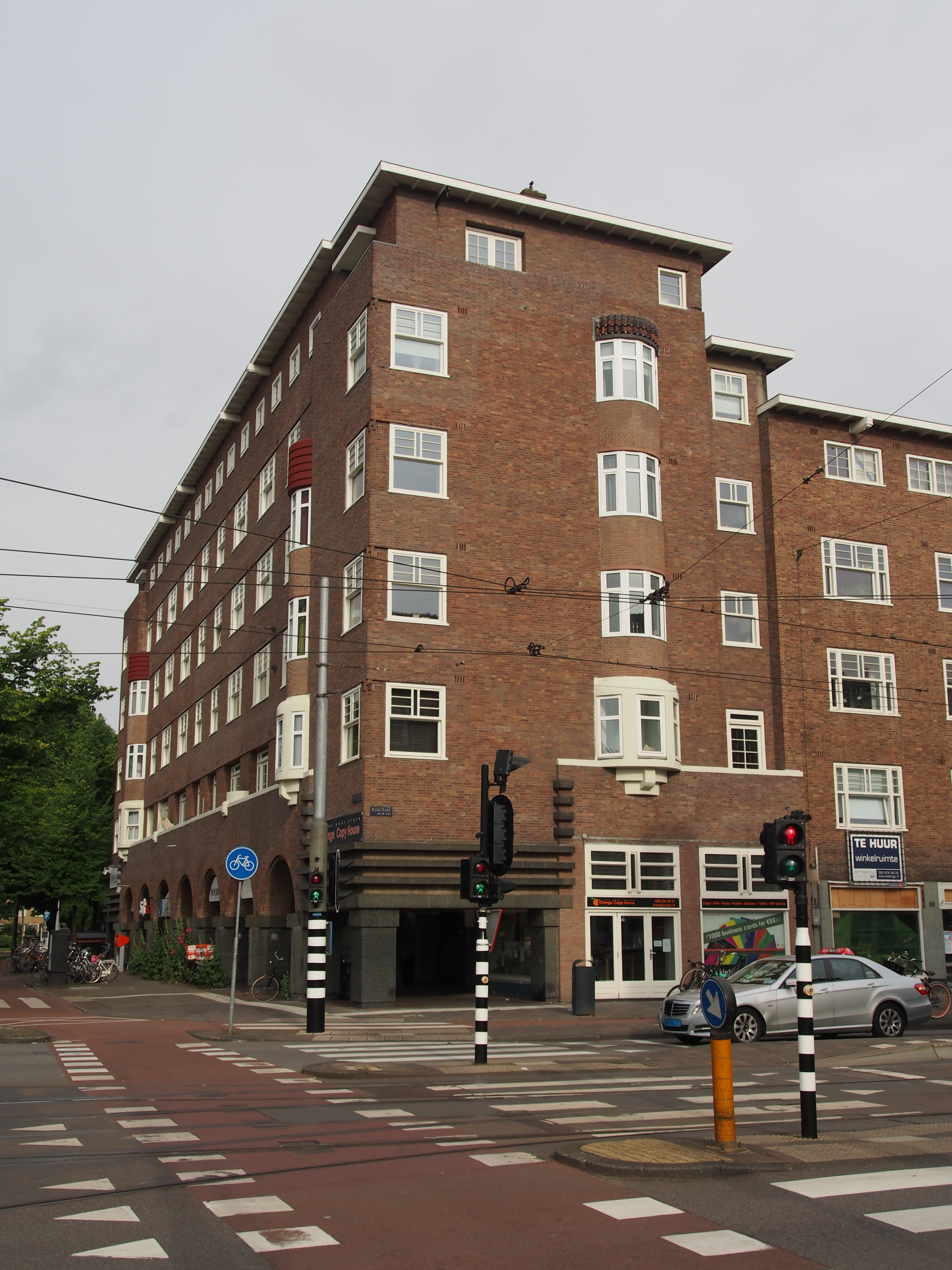

Cornelis Kruyswijk (1884–1935) was a Dutch architect, notable for his contributions to the Amsterdam School style.

== Biography ==
Born in Abcoude, the son of a carpenter contractor, Kruyswijk's early career involved work at his father's company while attending the Industrial School of the Society for the Working Class in Amsterdam.

Kruyswijk's professional career included roles in Dordrecht, Leeuwarden, Maastricht, and Amsterdam, working with architects such as Bert Johan Ouëndag, Harry Elte, and Philip Anne Warners. In 1919, he established his own practice in Amsterdam.

His architectural work includes schools, housing complexes, and churches, all designed in the Amsterdam School style characterized by expressive brickwork, natural stone, and iron ornamentation. In his work, he often did not distinguish itself significantly from his contemporaries, with the exception of specialized structures such as schools and churches. Over a hundred of his designs, primarily in Amsterdam, are documented, including notable projects such as the Smallepadschool, JJ van Noortschool, and various residential and commercial buildings in Amsterdam South and West.
