= Amsterdamse Joffers =

Group of 19th century Dutch women artists

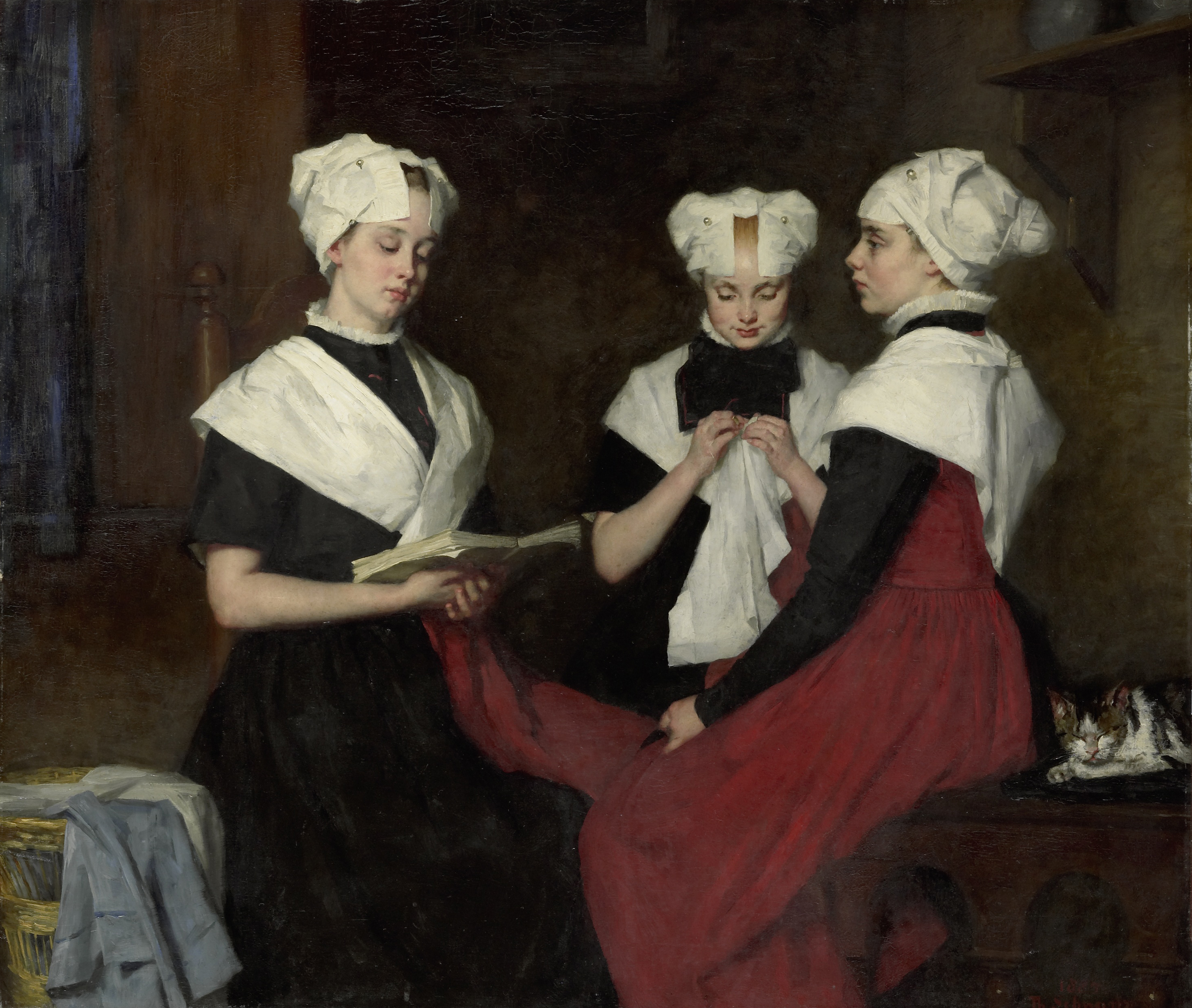
Thérèse Schwartze (1885): Three girls of the orphanage in Amsterdam – Rijksmuseum of Amsterdam.

The Amsterdamse Joffers were a group of women artists who met weekly in Amsterdam at the end of the 19th and beginning of the 20th century. They supported each other in their professional careers. Most of them were students of the Rijksakademie van beeldende kunsten and belonged to the movement of the Amsterdam Impressionists. Each one became a successful artist. As a group they contributed to the social acceptance in the Netherlands of women becoming professional artists.

== Origin and development ==
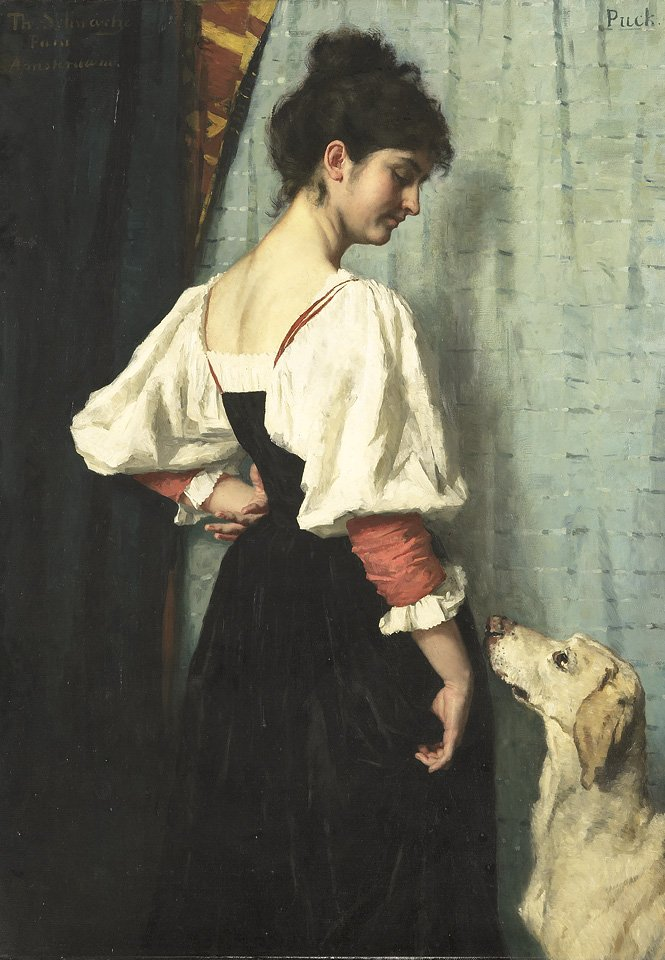
Thérèse Schwartze (after 1879): Young Italian with her dog Puck – Rijksmuseum Amsterdam.

=== Beginning ===
In 1894, Lizzy Ansingh and Coby Ritsema began their studies at the Rijksacademie in a separate class for female students. Around them, a group of young women, mostly fellow-students, came together to found a circle. The purpose was to exchange experiences as women who wanted to become professional artists. They had weekly meetings at the residence of Thérèse Schwartze, an established painter who was Ansingh's aunt.

They came from wealthy and artistic families, and did not depend on painting for their livelihoods. Almost all of them were students of the Rijksakademie and followed classes with August Allebé, Nicolaas van der Waay and Carel Dake. Suze Robertson was in certain ways an exception in the group. She was older, already married and had studied at the Delft University of Technology. Nelly Bodenheim was an illustrator, not a painter like the other members. Ansingh, Ritsema, Robertson, Jacoba Surie and Betsy Westendorp-Osieck were members of artist associations Arti et Amicitiae, kunstvereniging Sint Lucas and Pulchri Studio.

Ritsema is considered the most talented of the group. She initially received her education at the Haarlem School of Art before joining the women's group at the Rijksakademie. She was influenced by Dutch impressionists such as her brother Jacob Ritsema, George Hendrik Breitner and Fredrik Theodorus Grabijn. Some of Ritsema's students were Jacoba Surie, Jan van den Hengst, Tine Honey, Victoire Winix and Lize Duyvis.

Starting around 1900, at the annual art exhibitions of the artist societies Sint Lucas in the Stedelijk Museum, Arti et Amicitiae and Pulchri Studios, works of Ansingh, Ritsema and Robertson were exhibited and favourably received.

=== Individual recognition ===
In the first decade of the 20th century, the members of the circle were regularly present at the annual art exhibits of artist societies in Amsterdam. In 1905 Ansing, Ritsema and Marie van Regteren-Altena participated in a collective exhibit in Hamburg. In 1906, Ansingh received the Willink van Collenprijs, a prestigious recognition for young artists. In 1907, members of the group participated in an exhibition of international masters in the Stedelijk Museum. In 1910, Ritsema won the bronze medal at the Brussels international. At that time, the young women were established artists. In 1919, Ansingh and Ritsema became the first female board members with voting rights of the Arti and Amicitiae artist association.

=== Collective recognition: the group adopts a name ===
Albert Plasschaert, art critic and pen friend of Ansingh, named the group Amsterdamse Joffers in a newspaper article in 1912. The term Amsterdamsche Joffers, as it was spelled at the time, was known because of an unrelated historical novel by Marie van Zeggelen from 1900. The novel carried illustrations by Ansingh. The name stuck, not in the least because the artists themselves, already approaching their 40's, used it frequently. The word Joffer means maiden, Miss or young lady. In the 1920s and under the name Amsterdam Joffers the group frequently exhibited their work at Kunstzaal Frans Buffa, an Amsterdam art gallery. A 1947 book by Johan van Eikeren consolidated the expression Amsterdamse Joffers in Dutch art history. The separate class for women at the Rijksacademie was long gone.

== Style and subject ==
The Amsterdamse Joffers used different styles but in general terms are part of the Amsterdam Impressionism art movement. Their subject choice is dominated by still life and portraiture. Ansing was famous for her paintings of dolls.

The female painters of the Amsterdam Impressionism belonged to a later generation than the French female impressionists Marie Bracquemond (1840–1916), Mary Cassatt (1845–1926), Eva Gonzalès (1847–1893) and Berthe Morisot (1841–1895). Characteristic of the French female impressionists is the powerful, light-filled color palette with lively motifs. The Joffers used colours typical of the leading Dutch impressionist movement, the Hague School. These darker colours create a quieter and more melancholic atmosphere. The French women painters preferred landscape painting of coasts, harbors and countryside with views of the city, together with still life and portrait. The Dutch women chose almost exclusively still life and portrait. The style and subject of each group reflect the time and context in which they worked, which is in a way the essence of impressionism.

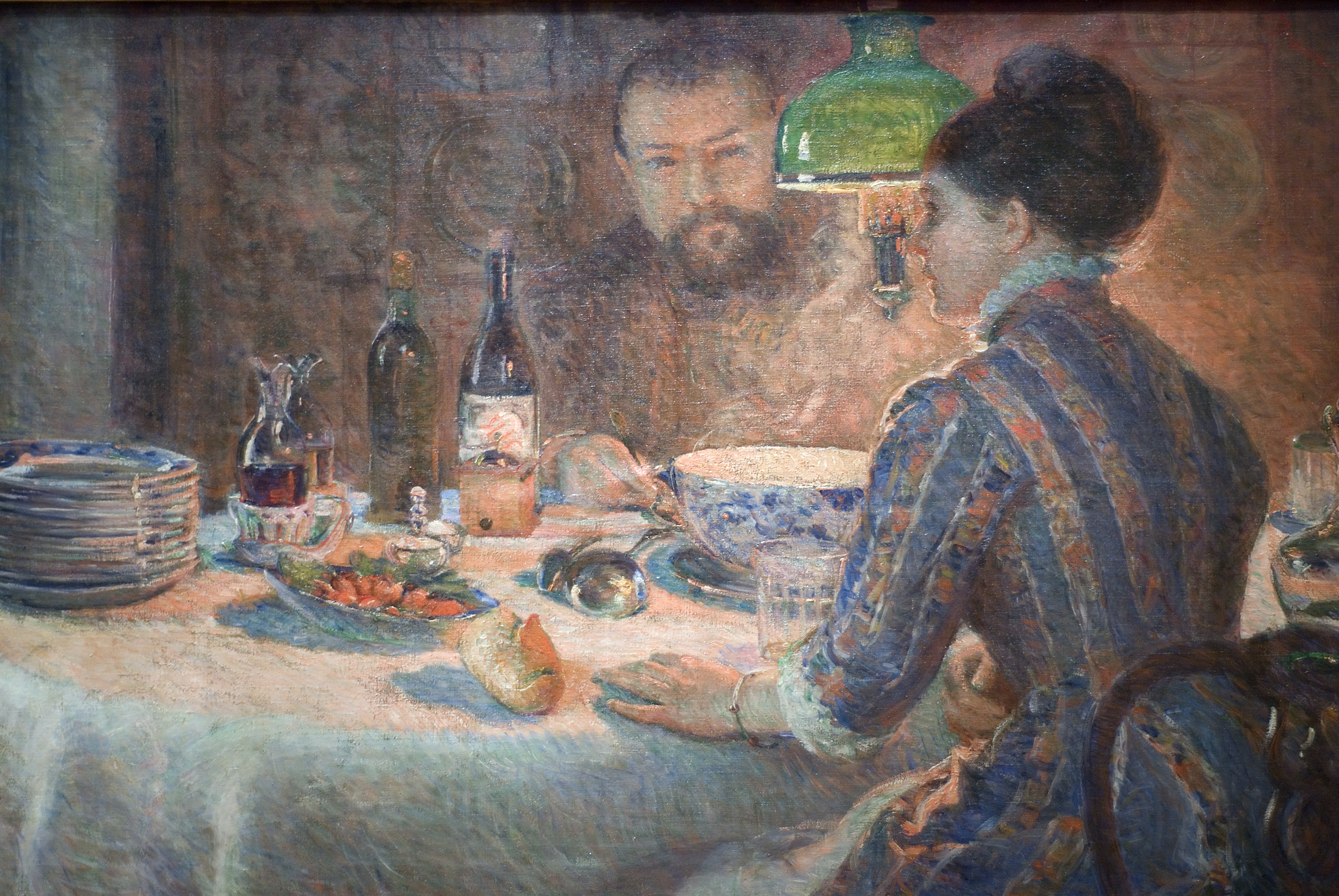
Marie Bracquemond (1887): Under the Lamp – Sisley and his wife dine at the Braquements in Sèvres, private collection.

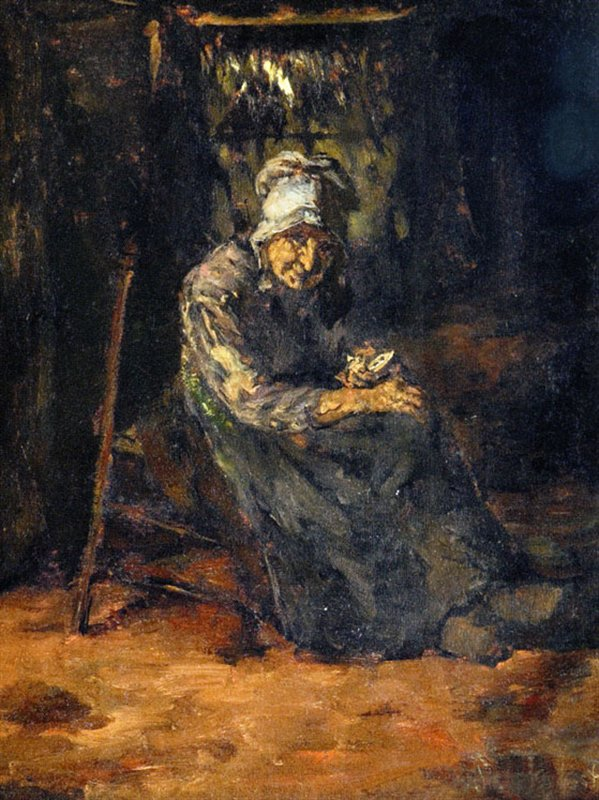
Suze Robertson (1883): The woman as a card reader – Breda Museum of Breda.

== Members of the circle ==
The 1947 book by Johan van Eikeren identified eight artists as Amsterdamse Joffers: Ansingh, Ritsema, van den Berg, Bauer-Stumpff, Bodenheim, Westendorp-Osieck, Surie and van Regteren-Altena. Other analysts often include also Robertson and Ansingh's sister, Sorella Therese. The influence of host and mentor Theresa Schwartz is also often recognized. Although Suze Robertson is sometimes named as one of the Joffers, she is not one of them.

- Lizzy Ansingh (1875–1959)
- Jo Bauer-Stumpff (1873–1951)
- Ans van den Berg (1873–1942)
- Nelly Bodenheim (1874–1951)
- Marie van Regteren Altena (1868–1958)
- Jacoba Johanna (Coba) Ritsema (1876–1961)
- Jacoba Surie (1879–1970)
- Johanna Elisabeth (Betsy) Westendorp-Osieck (1880–1968)

== Related artists ==
- Thérèse Ansingh (1883–1968)
- Elsa van Doesburgh (1875–1957)
- Thérèse Schwartze (1851–1918), mentor
- Josefa Tepe (1884–1962)
- Marie Wandscheer (1855–1936)

== Selected works ==
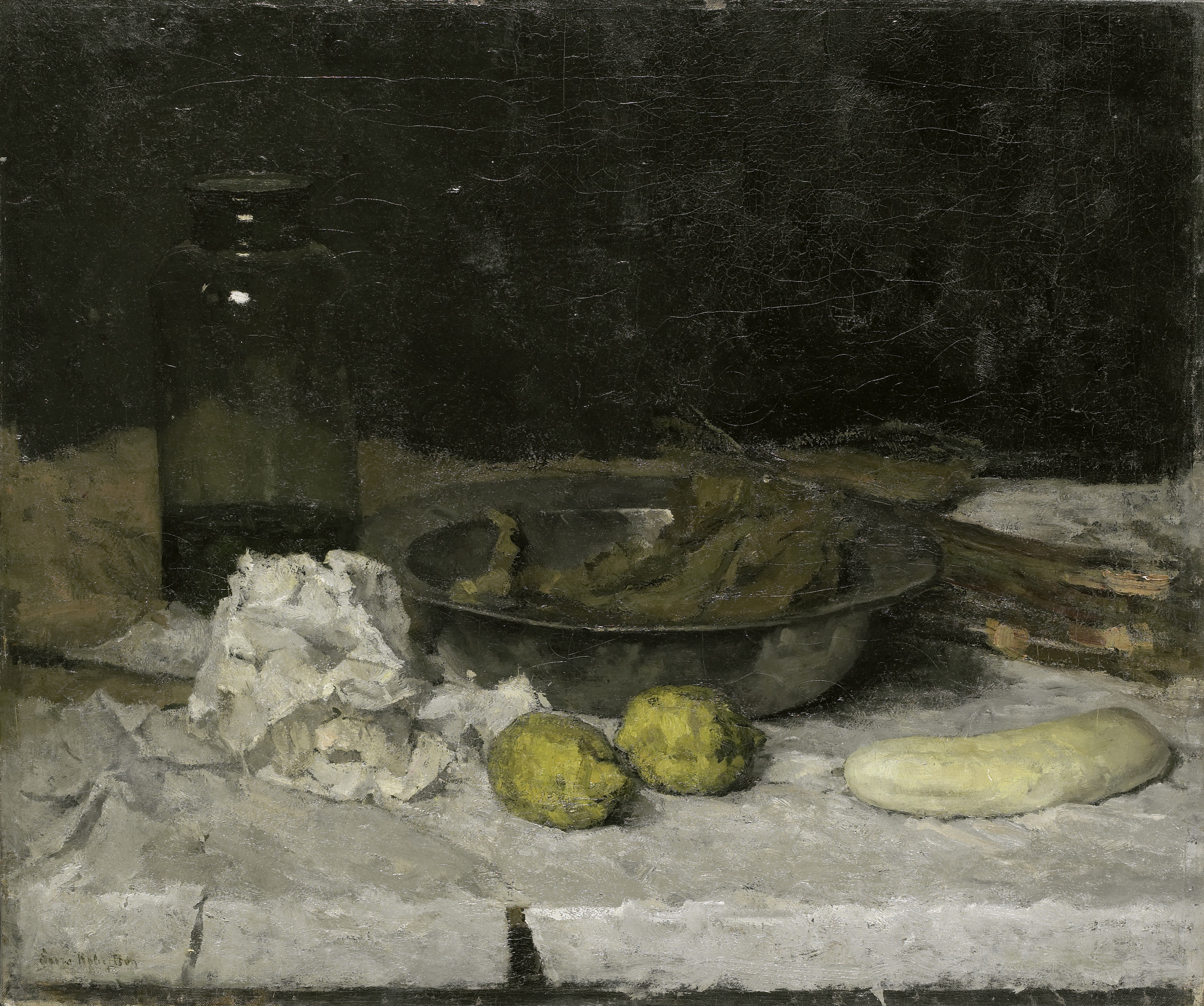
Suze Robertson (before 1922): Still life with pewter plate and bottle – Rijsmuseum of Amsterdam.

- Lizzy Ansingh: The sourcer of life, 124,5 × 174 cm, oil
- Ans van den Berg: White and red azaleas, 76 × 65 cm, oil
- Jacobe Surie: Pisces, 50 × 70,2 cm, oil on canvas
- Betsy Westendorp: Still life with glass paint pots, 25,0 × 19,4 cm, oil on canvas
- Jo Bauer-Stumpf: Still life with anemones, 56,9 × 48 cm, oil on canvas
- Coba Ritsema: Girl in a studio, 32,4 × 46,5 cm, oil on canvas
- Johanna Elisabeth Westendorp-Osieck: Still life with cancer, 23,6 × 24,5 cm, oil on canvas
- Marie van Regteren Altena: Atelier with nacked modell, 51,2 × 76,8 cm, oil on canvas
- Ans van den Berg: Still life with chrysanthemum, 40,8 × 76,8 cm, oil
- Nelly Bodenheim: Illustrations of hand posters
- Thérèse Schwartze: Portrait of Lizzy Ansingh, 40,4 × 49,4 cm, oil

== Museum Guide of the Amsterdamse Joffers ==
Many museums in the Netherlands and abroad have works by the Amsterdam Joffers in their collections.

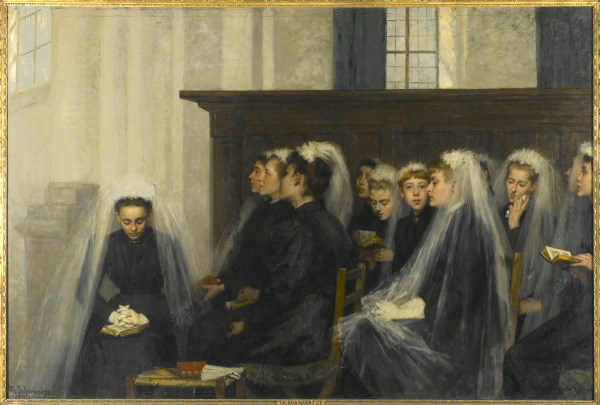
Thérèse Schwartze (1894): Lutheran initiates – Stedelijk Museum of Amsterdam

- Breda Museum, Breda
- Dordrechts Museum, Dordrecht
- Gemeentmuseum, Den Haag
- Musée du Jeu de Paume, Paris
- Museum Boijmans, Rotterdam
- Rijksmuseum, Amsterdam
- Stedelijk Museum, Amsterdam
- Van Abbemuseum, Eindhoven
- Centraal Museum, Utrecht
- Teylers Museum, Haarlem

== Exhibitions ==
- 1903 Stedelijke internationale tentoonstelling van kunstwerken van levende meesters, Stedelijk Museum, Amsterdam.
- 1905 Thérèse Schwartze represented in the exhibition of works of art from Wiesbaden and Biebrich private Collections
- 1905 Lizzy Ansingh, Jacoba Ritsema and Marie van Regteren Altena in the collection of the "Arti et Amicitiae" and "Pulchri Studio" – Kunstverein in Hamburg zu Hamburg
- 1907 Stedelijke internationale tentoonstelling van kunstwerken van levende meesters, Stedelijk Museum, Amsterdam.
- 1912 Stedelijke internationale tentoonstelling van kunstwerken van levende meesters, Stedelijk Museum, Amsterdam.
- 1913 Exhibition: Women from 1813 to 1913 – Stedelijk Museum Amsterdam
- 1955 Suze Robertson – Rijksmuseum Amsterdam
- 1984 Suze Robertson – Stedelijk Museum Amsterdam
- 1991 Lizzy Ansingh in a joint exhibition in Amsterdam
- 1991 Nelly Bodenheim – Amsterdam Historical Museum
- 2003/2004 Suze Robertson – Museum Rijswijk
- 2005/2006 Lizzy Ansingh – Museum Arnhem
- 2008/2009 Suze Robertson – Museum Kempenland
- 2022 Amsterdamse Joffers - Museum Villa Mondriaan

== Selected references ==
- Betsy Westendorp-Osieck, 1880–1940. tentoonstellingscatalogus, Stedelijk Museum, Amsterdam 1941.
- Johan H. van Eikeren: De Amsterdamse Joffers: Marie E. van Regteren Altena, Ans van den Berg, Jo Bauer-Stumpff, Nelly Bodenheim, Lizzy Ansingh, Coba Ritsema, Coba Surie, Betsi Westendorp-Osieck. F. G. Kroonder, 1947.
- Gerritsen-Kloppenburg, Mieke en Henriëtte Coppes (1991): De kunst van het beschutte bestaan: vijf schilderessen aan het begin van deze eeuw: Thérèse Schwartze, Betzy Rezora Berg, Jacoba van Heemskerck, Ans van den Berg, Betsy Osieck, Heerlen,
- Ingrid Glorie: Juffers en Joffers: een eerbewijs aan vrouwen in de Schilderkunst. De Doelenpers, 2000, ISBN 90-70655-27-6.
- G. H. Marius: Dutch Art in the XIX Century. London., 1908.
- Geurt Imanse: Van Gogh bis Cobra: holländische Malerei 1880–1950. Hatje, 1980, ISBN 3-7757-0160-5.
- K. W. Lim: Aziatische kunst uit het legaat Westendorp. Amsterdam, 1968.
- Ingrid Pfeiffer, Max Hollein: Impressionistinnen. Hatje Cantz, 2008, ISBN 978-3-7757-2078-6.
- Adriaan Venema: De Amsterdamse Joffers. Baarn, 1977.
- Betsy Westendorp-Osieck: Aquarellen, tekeningen en pastels. 's-Gravenhage, 1951.
