= List of paintings by Suze Robertson =

The following is a list of paintings by Suze Robertson that are generally accepted as autograph by the RKD and other sources.

Image	Title	Year	Size	Inventory nr.	Gallery	Location
	Portrait of a young woman	before 1922	32.3 cm x 26. cm	SK-A-4695	Rijksmuseum	Amsterdam
	Self-portrait	1890	50 x 40 cm	33-X-1963	Kunstmuseum Den Haag	The Hague
	Bowl of flowers	before 1922		1985.0450	Groninger Museum	Groningen
	Woman in a courtyard	before 1922	0	1959.0135	Groninger Museum	Groningen
	A plate with apples and a bottle	ca 1890	34.5 cm x 45.5 cm	21820	Centraal Museum	Utrecht
	Antiques Stall	1900–1901	43.5 cm x 69.5 cm	10134	Centraal Museum	Utrecht
	Church in Katwijk	between 1915 and 1920	89 cm x 77 cm	9298	Centraal Museum	Utrecht
	Fishers' Gate in Harderwijk	before 1922	83 cm x 101 cm	S84/79	Stedelijk Museum Amsterdam	Amsterdam
	Woman peeling potatoes	before 1922	26.2 cm x 21 cm	SK-A-4696	Rijksmuseum	Amsterdam
	Lena	before 1922	152.5 cm x 84.5 cm	DM/907/445	Dordrechts Museum	Dordrecht
	Corner of the artist studio	before 1922		1905.0046	Groninger Museum	Groningen
	Still Life	before 1922	75 x 90 cm	SK-C-1678	Rijksmuseum	Amsterdam
	White houses (Vollenhove)	ca 1907	28.5 x 25.2 cm		Private collection	
	Pietje	before 1922			Private collection	
	The Wood Breaker	before 1922	80 x 61.5 cm		Private collection	
	Courtyard together with a Work by Johan Buning	before 1922			Private collection	
	Mother and child	before 1922	40 cm x 32 cm		Private collection	
	Alley with woman	before 1922			Private collection	

== Sources ==
- Suze Robertson in the RKD
