= Coba Ritsema =

Dutch painter (1876–1961)

Jacoba Johanna (Coba) Ritsema
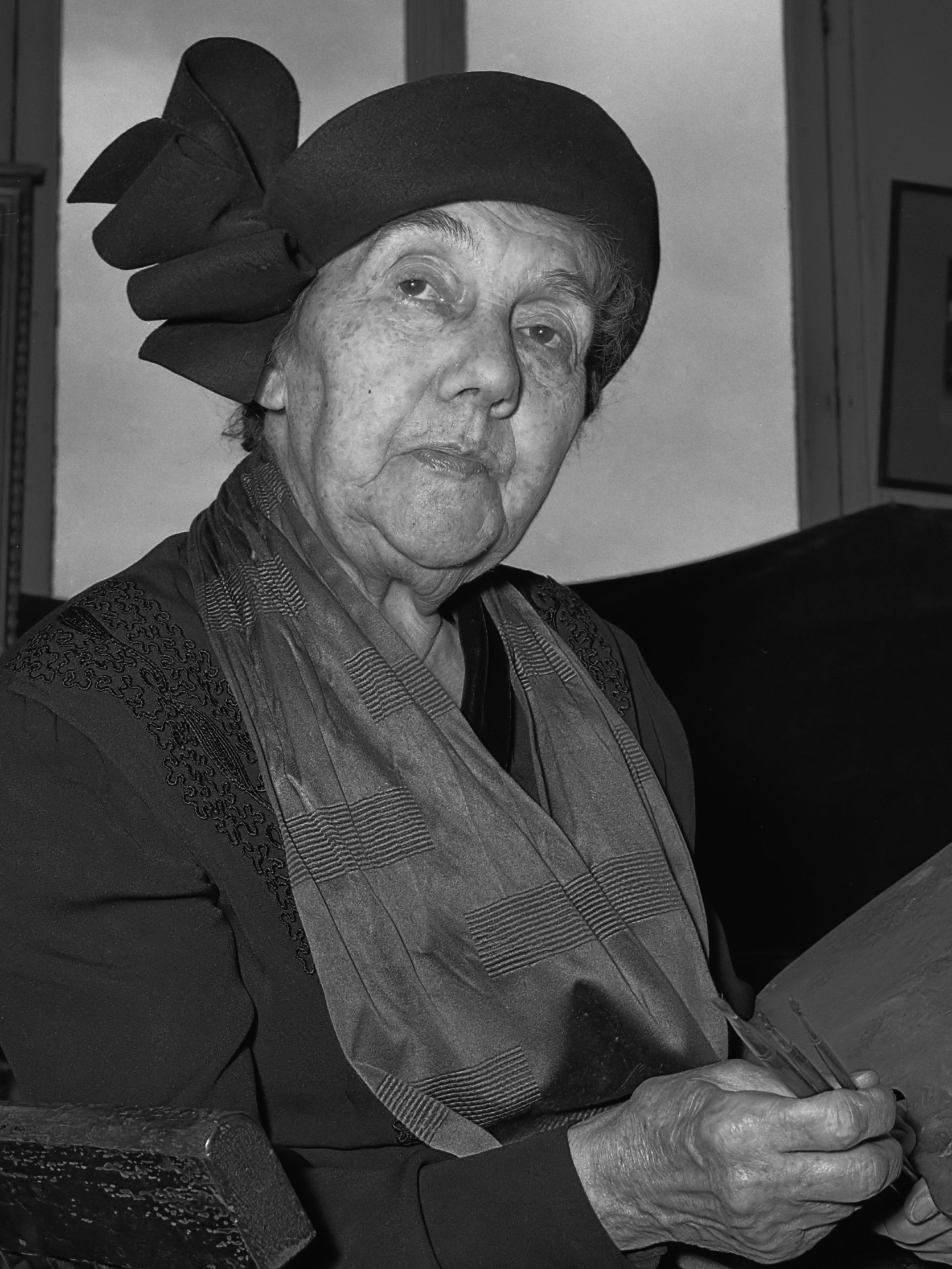
- Ritsema in 1956
- Born: June 26, 1876; Haarlem, Netherlands
- Died: December 13, 1961 (aged 85); Amsterdam, Netherlands
- Known for: Painting
- Movement: Amsterdamse Joffers

Jacoba Johanna (Coba) Ritsema (26 June 1876, Haarlem – 13 December 1961, Amsterdam), was a portrait painter from the Netherlands.

== Biography ==
Jacoba, or Coba, was born in 1876 as the daughter of the book printer Coenraad Ritsema and his wife Jeanette (Jannetje) Moulijn in an artistic family with one sister and two brothers. In her family there were already a few known artists - her grandfather Jacob Ritsema was an amateur painter, her father was a lithograph and the painter and etcher Simon Moulijn was a nephew of her mother.

Her brother was studying at the Academy of Düsseldorf since his 15th year, also the age when Coba also was allowed to experience herself in the arts. However, for a girl it was not realistic to go abroad at such young age, and she was taught drawing at the Haarlemse School voor Kunstnijverheid from 1891 until 1893. Her sister Catherine tried to become a pianist (and later became violist) and her brother Johan studied lithography like his father. From 1893 until 1897 Coba studied at the Rijksacademie van Beeldende Kunsten in Amsterdam where she was taught in a special class for female artists. She was in her education a pupil of August Allebé, George Hendrik Breitner, Carel Lodewijk Dake, Fredrik Theodorus Grabijn, Jacob Ritsema (her brother), Thérèse Schwartze, and Nicolaas van der Waay.

After moving back to Haarlem for a short period, she moved in 1899 to a house at Jan Luykenstraat 23 in Amsterdam, while she had her studio at the fourth floor of Singel 512. She focused herself on the still life style, and was rejected by several famous artists she had in mind as tutor - they thought they insecure Ritsema didn't need their guidance. She was a member of the Lucas Society and Arti et Amicitiae (where she was one of the first female voting members), societies around her example Thérèse Schwartze. Recognition would however follow: in 1910 she won the bronze medal at the Exposition Universelle et Internationale in Brussels, in 1912 and in 1923 she won a silver medal from the city of Amsterdam, and in 1918 she won a Royal medal given to her by Queen Wilhelmina. In 1912 the critic Albert Plasschaert mentioned the circle of friends of which Ritsema was a part to be the Amsterdamsche Joffers (Amsterdam Young ladies) - a group of young rich female artists who worked together a lot and had a joint vision on art. She became a teacher of the students Grada Jacoba Wilhelmina Boks, Lize Duyvis, Jan den Hengst, Tine Honig, Coba Surie, Hillegonga Henriëtte Tellekamp, Victoire Wirix, and Gonda Wulfse. She was not considered to be an explicit feminist, but at the same time an example of an independent woman.

Ritsema's work was included in the 1939 exhibition and sale Onze Kunst van Heden (Our Art of Today) at the Rijksmuseum in Amsterdam.

While focusing on still lifes and portraits, Ritsema's works were described in 1947 by critic Johan van Eikeren as if they could have been produced by a man - something that was considered to be a compliment in those years. Her work was usually well sold, although she was not such a master that she could afford to refuse to make compromises. In her portraits there is a clear difference between those of her relatives and direct connections, which are painted rather realistic, and those of models - which are usually more impressionist.

Coba was close with her brother Jacob, and when he suddenly died in 1943, she took that hard - Jacob was also a painter after all, and she consulted him a lot on her work. In 1957 she won the Rembrandt prize - a prize awarded by the city of Amsterdam once every five years. At old age she remained active although her studio wasn't easy to reach for a woman at age like herself, being on the fourth floor - she had chairs placed on every floor the way up, to be able to rest on each floor while she climbed. In her final years she lived in Pro Sinecure at the Amsterdam Vondelstraat, where she died from her weak heart in 1961.

She was a member of the Pulchri Studio in the Hague, as well as being a member of the Teekengenootschap Pictura. Works of Ritsema are on display in the Teylers Museum and Mesdag van Calcar, but she also had a solo exposition in the Frans Hals Museum.
