= Woman in a Courtyard =

1959 painting by Suze Robertson

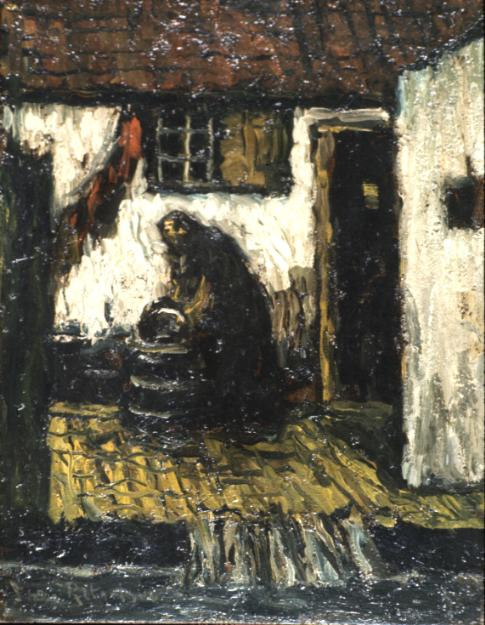
- Artist: Suze Robertson
- Type: genre art
- Medium: oil paint
- Subject: woman
- Location: Groninger Museum
- Accession: 1959.0135

Woman in a Courtyard is an oil painting by the impressionist painter Suze Robertson acquired by the Groninger Museum in 1959.

== See also ==
- List of paintings by Suze Robertson
