= The Temptation of St Anthony (Utrecht) =

Painting by a follower of Hieronymus Bosch

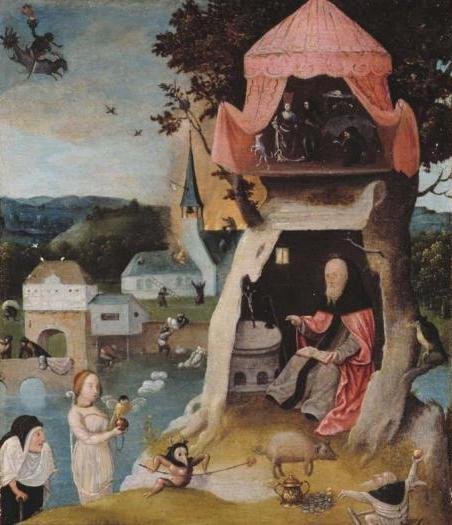
The Temptation of St Anthony (c. 1525–1530)

The Temptation of St Anthony is an oil on panel painting by a follower of Hieronymus Bosch, created c. 1525 to 1530. It is now in the Centraal Museum, in Utrecht.
