= Nelly Bodenheim =

Dutch illustrator

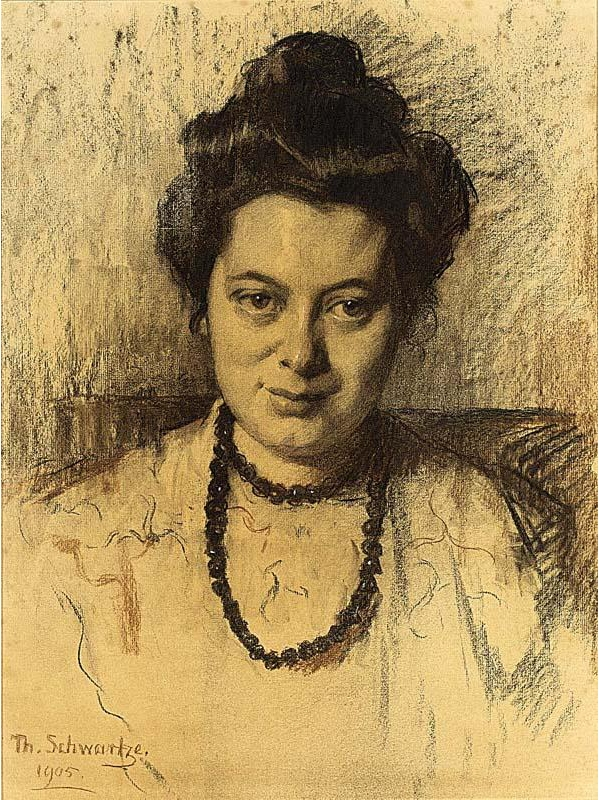
- Portrait of Nelly Bodenheim, by Thérèse Schwartze, 1905
- Born: 27 May 1874; Amsterdam
- Died: 7 January 1951 (aged 76)
- Education: Rijksacademie voor Beeldende Kunsten in Amsterdam
- Known for: Illustration

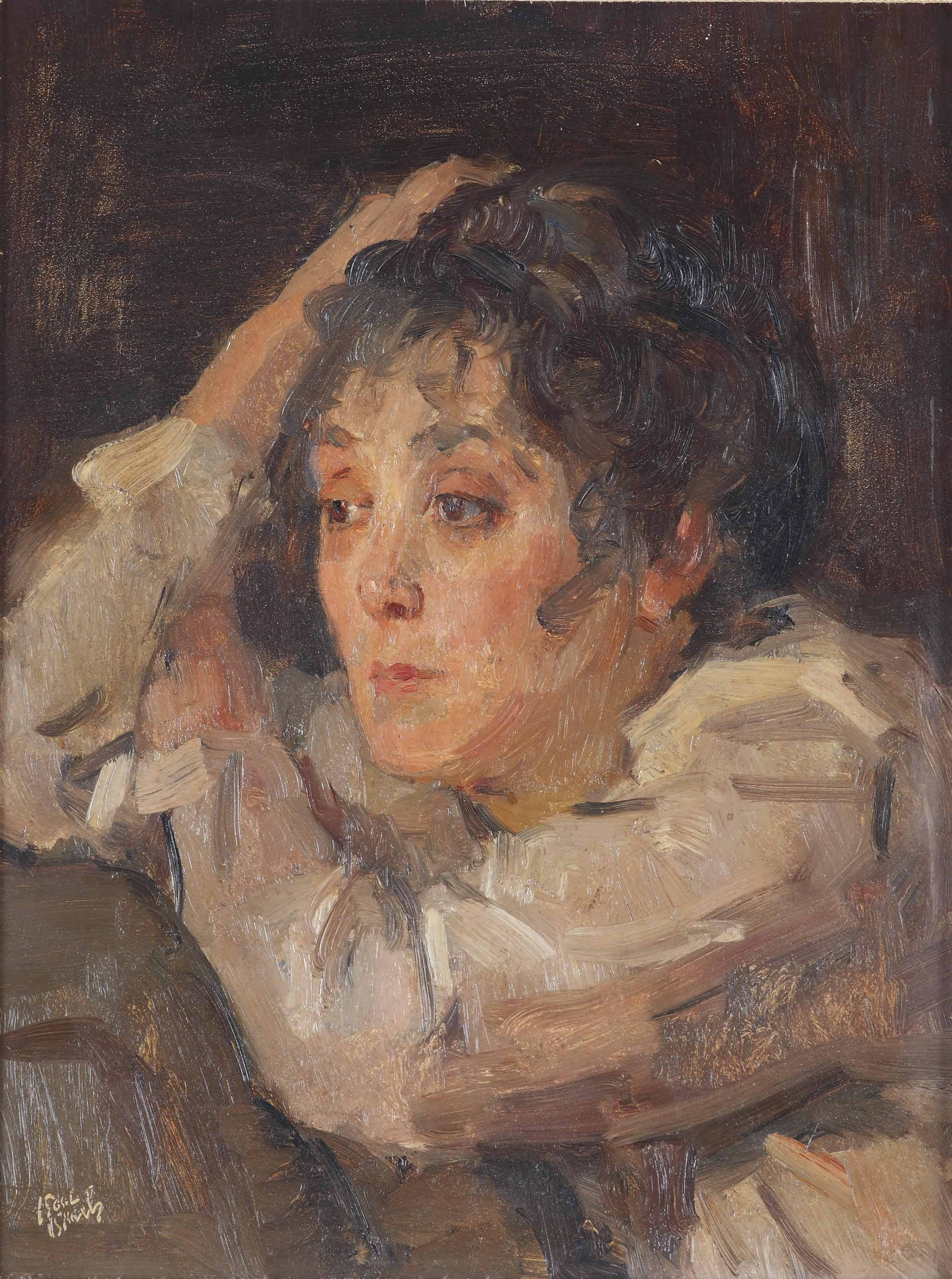
Nelly Bodenheim by Isaac Israels

Nelly Bodenheim or Johanna Cornelia Hermana Van Bodenheim (27 May 1874 – 7 January 1951) was a Dutch illustrator known for her silhouettes. Bodenheim trained at the Rijksacademie voor Beeldende Kunsten in Amsterdam, and then she followed lessons from the painter Jan Veth. Her illustrations (often for children's books) were generally black & white silhouettes but she is also known for color lithography. Besides illustrations for books and magazines, she designed textiles, posters, and book covers. She was a member of the group of artists known as the Amsterdamse Joffers.

Her silhouettes decorated the 1905 book Women Painters of the World. Bodenheim's work was included in the 1939 exhibition and sale Onze Kunst van Heden (Our Art of Today) at the Rijksmuseum in Amsterdam.

She was the second child of Godfried August Bodenheim (1840–1894) and Johanna Wispelwey (1847–1914). The family consisted of three girls and three boys. Her father owned a studio for gala and uniform clothing in the Kalverstraat in Amsterdam and was an art collector, which may have influenced Nelly's early interest in art.

At the age of thirteen, Bodenheim began formal art training, enrolling in a drawing course at the Gebouw van den Werkende Stand on the Kloveniersburgwal 87 in Amsterdam. In February 1893, she took the entrance exam for the Rijksakademie van Beeldende Kunsten, where she studied until 1895. During her time there, Bodenheim developed a passion for drawing and lithography, eventually apprenticing under the artist Jan Veth (1864–1925) in Bussum. Veth encouraged her artistic development, playing a crucial role in honing her skills.

In 1895, Bodenheim made her artistic debut in De Kroniek, a leading periodical of the time, with a colored lithograph illustrating the popular song Toen ik op Neerlands bergen staat.

Bodenheim is remembered for her contributions to Dutch visual arts, particularly in the fields of illustration and lithography. The first children's book she illustrated was "Rietje's pop", written by Tine van Berken. After this, 22 other books with old Dutch songs, fairy tales and nursery rhymes would be published by various publishers that were illustrated by her.

She also made botanical drawings for Professor Hugo de Vries to clarify his mutation theories and copied objects from her brother Frederik's art collection.

Nelly Bodenheim made needlework, which she exhibited from 1913 onwards. On large-meshed canvas, she embroidered with wool and cotton threads depictions and portraits of famous people from the world of sports and theatre, including dancer Josephine Baker and actor Charlie Chaplin.

She also made lampshades and cushions, and designed costumes for the play A Winter Evening Fairytale, performed in 1922 at the Amsterdam City Theatre under the direction of Willem Royaards.

In 1924, the Société Céramique in Maastricht produced a children's tableware set featuring images of the Kakelbont chicken family, for which Nelly provided the drawings and Lizzy Ansingh the text.

Nelly's social life mainly took place in Amsterdam. She was a member of "Arte et Amicitia" and knew many artists. After her mother's death, Nelly continued to live with her two sisters for the rest of her life, from 1922 onwards in the Valeriusstraat in Amsterdam. She had a studio at Herengracht 520: two spacious, light rooms on the top floor of an office building. Nelly drew in the back room, and the room on the canal side was furnished for her needlework.

Nelly had her work lithographed by others, which led to some criticism. However, her work was later appreciated for its originality and humor. Nelly maintained close contact with fellow students at the academy, including a group of friends referred to as the Amsterdam Joffers by art critic Albert Plasschaert (1874–1941).

From 1902 onwards, Nelly's work was exhibited at home and abroad, including in Turin in 1902 and at the World Exhibition in Paris in 1925.

In the Netherlands, she exhibited solo in 1918 at the Kleykamp art gallery in The Hague, in 1949 at the Stedelijk Museum in Amsterdam, and posthumously in 1991 with a retrospective exhibition at the Amsterdam Historical Museum.

Her work was featured again at the museum in the exhibition 1001 Women in the 20th Century (October 2018 – March 2019).

The Kunstmuseum in The Hague and the Museum Boijmans Van Beuningen in Rotterdam hold works by Nelly Bodenheim in their collections.

Nelly Bodenheim died on January 7, 1951, in Amsterdam and is buried at Zorgvlied in Amstelveen.

== Bibliography (Selection) ==
- 1897: Rietje’s pop – von Tine van Berken
- 1900: Handje Plak Online
- 1901: Het regent, het zegent Online
- 1902: Raadsels – Gerrit Jacob Boekenoogen
- 1903: In Holland staat een huis
- 1904: Silhouetten : gedichtjes van Freia. Online
- 1904: Backe, backe Kuchen
- 1908: Twaalf sprookjes en rijmpjes
- 1910–1920: Als het buiten regent : vertellingen voor onze kleintjes
- 1915: Luilekkerland
- 1917: ABC : de hond gaat mee, de kat blijft thuis, piep zei de muis in ’t voorhuis Online
- 1923: Groen groen grasje Online
- 1924: De gelaarsde kat : vertelling van een merkwaardige strafzaak Online
- 1925: De pruik van Cassander. Text von Pauline Seraphin (1846); bearbeitet von Eliza Hess-Binger Online
- 1927: ’n Vruchtenmandje. Gedichte von Lizzy Ansingh Online
- 1928: Fransche liedjes.
- 1936: Waarom en waardoor : nieuwe natuurlijke historie : oude volksverhalen. Online
