= Betsy Westendorp-Osieck =

Dutch painter who was part of the Amsterdamse Joffers painting group (1880–1968)

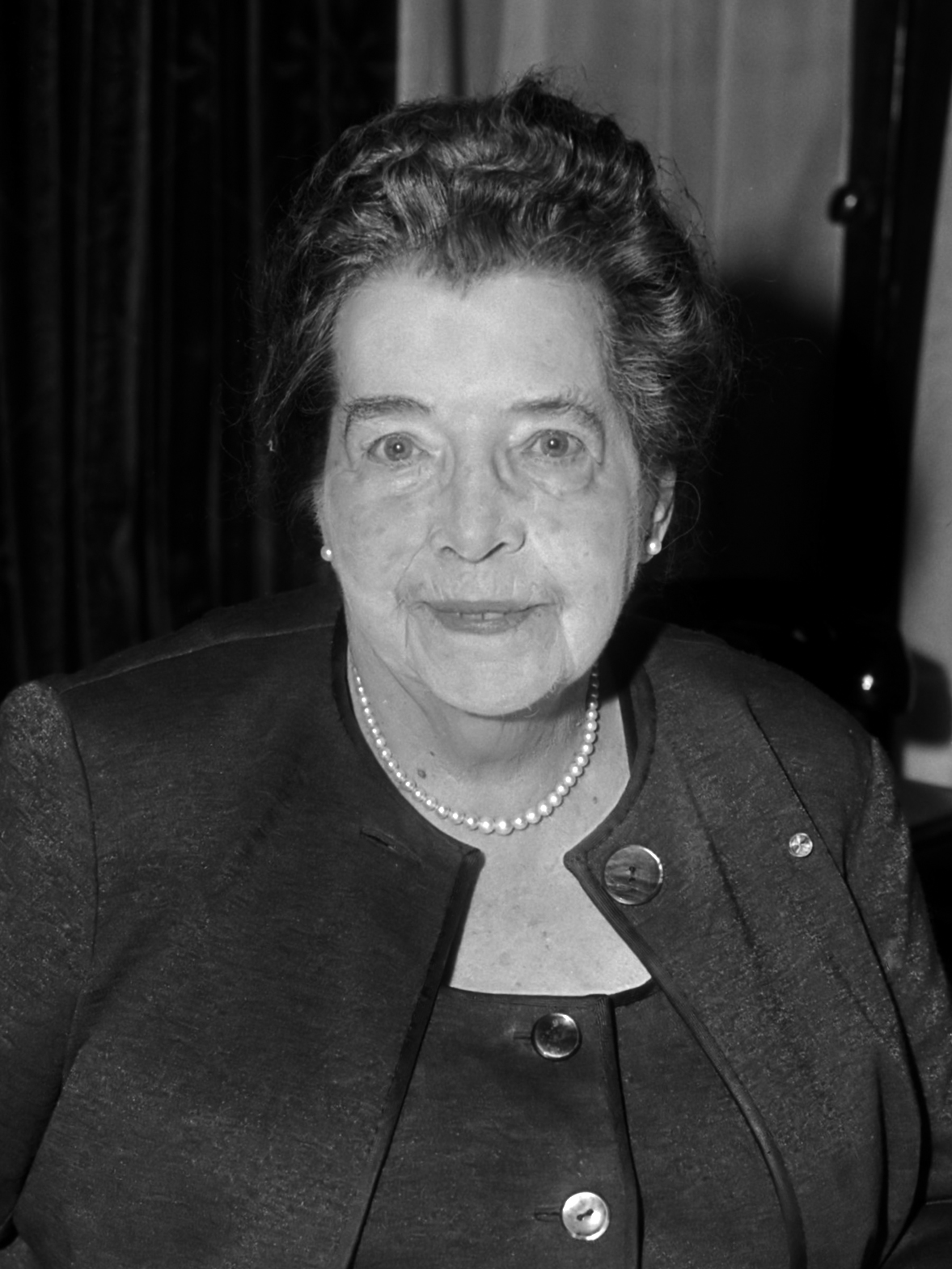
- Born: 29 December 1880; Amsterdam
- Died: 1 March 1968 (aged 87); Amsterdam
- Other names: Johanna Elisabeth Osieck; Betsy Westendorp; Johanna Elisabeth nee Osieck Westendorp-Osieck; Elisabeth Westendorp-Osieck; Betsy Osieck; Johanna Elisabeth Westendorp; Elisabeth Osieck

Betsy Westendorp-Osieck (29 December 1880 – 1 March 1968) was a Dutch painter, watercolourist, etcher, pastelist and draftswoman who was part of the Amsterdamse Joffers painting group.

== Biography ==
Johanna Elisabeth ("Betsy" or "Betsie") Osieck was born in Amsterdam 29 December 1880 to the merchant Philip Willem Osieck and Catharina Agnes Briel. She was one of a family of five, but one of them died as a child. Westendorp-Osieck attended a French secondary school before going to a German boarding school. She intended becoming a pianist but when that proved improbable she took up art. She initially studied with the Day Drawing School for Young Ladies in 1898. Westendorp-Osieck then studied with Lizzy Ansingh in 1902. Ansingh was also one of the Joffers painting group. She went on to study in Amsterdam at the Teekenschool voor den Werkenden Stand from 1905 to 1910 and at the State Academy of Fine Arts. Her first commission was to draw a certificate for the Amsterdam cradle for Princess Juliana made by Karel de Bazel in 1909. Westendorp-Osieck married on 21 June 1917 to Herman Karel Westendorp at which point her name changed. Her husband was an art collector of Asian art and a banker.

== Career ==
Westendorp-Osieck was a member of Arti et Amicitiae and the St. Luke Artists in Amsterdam. She was also a member of the Pulchri Studio in The Hague and the Dutch Watercolors Circle. As an etcher Westendorp-Osieck created a number of illustrations of the "Old Amsterdam garden houses" which was published by Bernard Houthakker in 1923. Westendorp-Osieck traveled extensively around America, Belgium, Cambodia, Ceylon, Egypt, France and Japan where she made travel sketches. Those from her 1931 trip through Asia were exhibited in both Amsterdam and The Hague. Another of her collections of etchings was published in 1932. Her husband published a book in 1933 which included etchings by Westendorp-Osieck. Her work was included in the 1939 exhibition and sale Onze Kunst van Heden (Our Art of Today) at the Rijksmuseum in Amsterdam.

Westendorp-Osieck won a number of awards, a silver medal for her entry in the DeVrouw Exhibition 1913, the Willink van Collenprijs in 1915, the St. Lucas Prize in 1930, and gold medals in 1936 and at the 1937 World Exhibition in Paris.

In 1941 Westendorp-Osieck became a widow. She was unable to exhibit in The Netherlands because she had not joined the Kultuurkamer. After the Second World War she exhibited again.

Westendorp-Osieck died on 1 March 1968 at the age of 87 in her hometown Amsterdam.

Her work is in the Rijksmuseum and the Centraal Museum in the Netherlands. The best of the couples Asian art collection was donated to the Rijksmuseum, where it is known as the Westendorp-Osieck Collection.

== Bibliography ==
- Old Amsterdam garden houses: ten etchings, (Amsterdam 1923)
- Old Dutch facing bricks: etchings, (The Hague 1932)
- Japan: illustrated with 6 watercolors, (Nijmegen 1933)
