= Lizzy Ansingh =

Dutch painter (1875–1959)

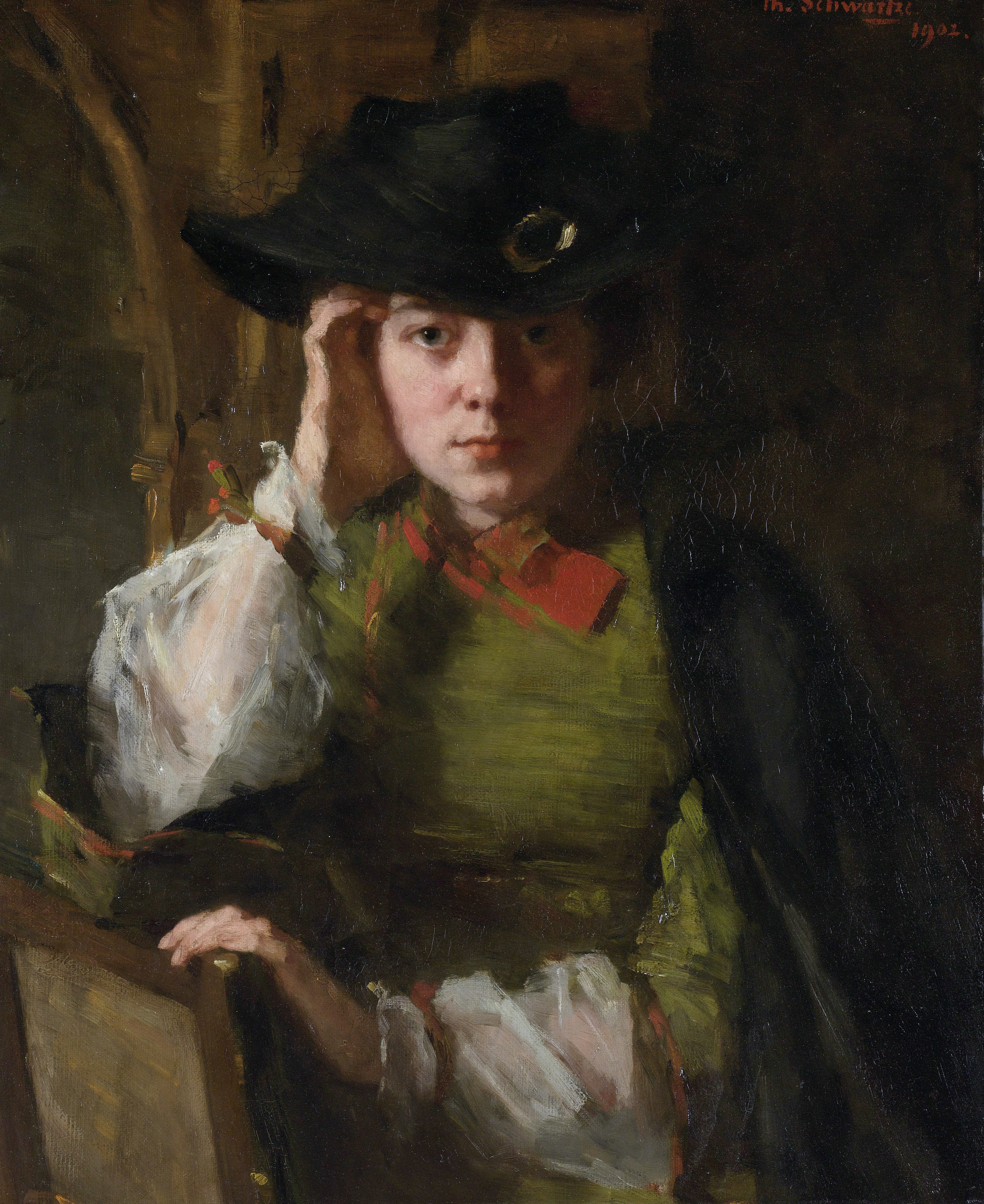
- 1902 portrait by Thérèse Schwartze
- Born: Maria Elisabeth Georgina Ansingh; 13 March 1875; Utrecht, Netherlands
- Died: 14 December 1959 (aged 84); Amsterdam, Netherlands
- Known for: Painting
- Movement: Amsterdamse Joffers

Maria Elisabeth Georgina Ansingh (13 March 1875 – 14 December 1959) was a Dutch painter.

Ansingh belonged to a group of female post-impressionist painters influenced by the Amsterdam Impressionism movement called the Amsterdamse Joffers. She was also a member of the (still existing) Amsterdam art circles Arti et Amicitiae and Sint Lucas. She died in Amsterdam on 14 December 1959.

== Biography ==
Lizzy Ansingh was born in Utrecht. She was the daughter of Edzard Willem Ansingh, a pharmacist, and painter Clara Theresia Schwartze. She was the granddaughter of Johann Georg Schwartze, also a painter, and a niece of the painter Thérèse Schwartze. It was her aunt Thérèse Schwartze who gave Lizzy her first lessons in drawing. Lizzy lived with her aunt for 16 years, because of her mother's poor health. She encouraged her niece to develop her artistic career and introduced her to numerous other painters, among others French impressionists and the famous Dutch painters George Hendrik Breitner, Piet Mondriaan and Simon Maris. Her younger sister, Thérèse, was also a painter.

During the years 1894–1897 Lizzy studied at the Amsterdam Royal Academy of Visual Arts. Here she studied with the professors August Allebé, Nicolaas van der Waay and Carel Dake. Her work was also part of the painting event in the art competition at the 1928 Summer Olympics.

At the Academy a lasting friendship was born between a group of female painters, later called the Amsterdamse Joffers: Lizzy Ansingh, Marie van Regteren Altena, Suze Bisschop-Robertson, Coba Ritsema, Ans van den Berg, Jacoba Surie, Nelly Bodenheim, Betsy Westendorp-Osieck and Jo Bauer-Stumpff. The importance of the Amsterdamse Joffers lies primarily in functioning as role models for younger female painters in the Netherlands, especially during and after the 1970s.

== Other works ==
Besides portrait painting, Ansingh gained celebrity for painting dolls, in which she was also encouraged by her aunt Thérèse Schwartze. She purchased a circa 1740-1750 dollhouse in which she arranged her dolls for inspiration, as well as furnishing it with numerous other articles she collected. Her Amsterdam studio in the Herengracht, along with the dollhouse, was severely damaged on the night of 27 April 1943 when a British bomber was shot down, destroying the Carlton Hotel and much of the Reguliersdwarsstraat alongside her studio (the ensuing fire was the most devastating in Amsterdam since 1659 and is recorded in Anne Frank's diary). The dollhouse has since been restored and can be seen at the Museum Arnhem.

She also wrote two books for children, `n Vruchtenmandje (A little fruit basket), published in 1927, and Tante Tor is jarig (Aunt Tor has her birthday). This booklet, published in 1950, was illustrated by Nelly Bodenheim.

== Public Collections ==
- Rijksmuseum Amsterdam
