= Jan Carbaat =

Dutch painter

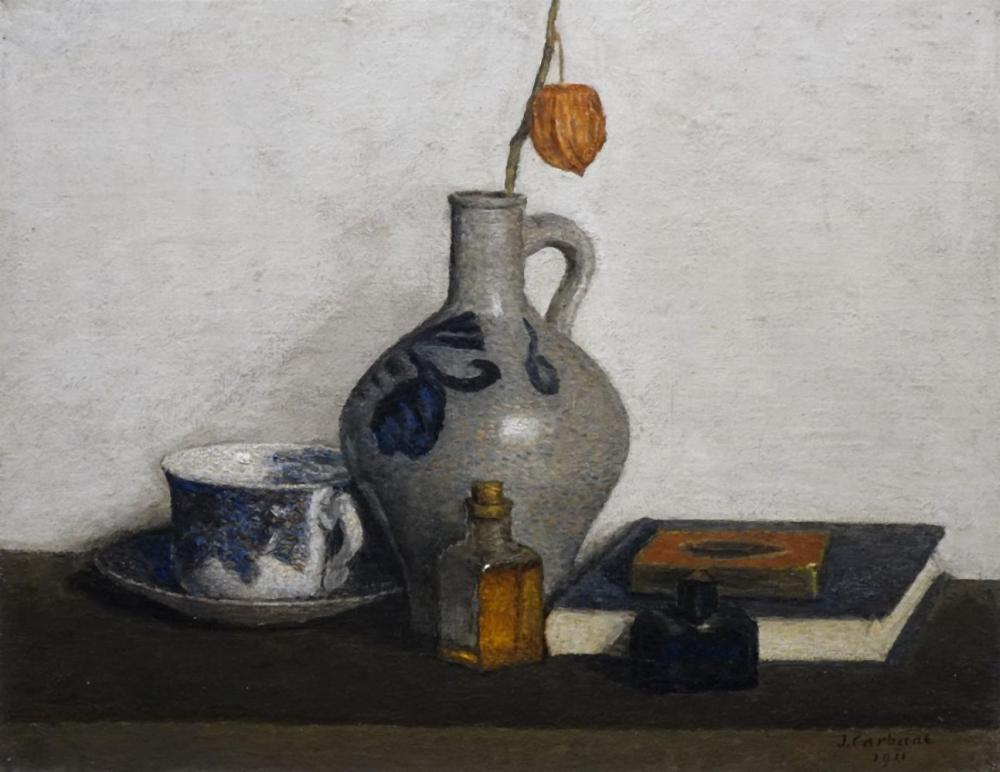
Jan Carbaat, Still life, 1911

Jan Carbaat (Koog aan de Zaan, 12 March 1866 – Rhenen, 24 May 1925) was a Dutch painter of still lifes, landscape scenes, and buildings.

Jan Carbaat was the son of Johanna Oosterhoorn and Jan Carbaat sr. He grew up in Koog aan de Zaan. He spent his life alongside his friend and painter Jan Adam Zandleven. At the beginning of the 20th century the artist duo was supported by the art critic H.P. Bremmer. He purchased work by both of them at a so-called "cost price" of fifteen guilders per canvas much of which ended up in private collections and in the Kröller-Müller Museum, which owns a collection of Zandleven's paintings and Carbaat's drawings.

Around 1910, Carbaat and Zandleven gave evening courses in hand and architectural drawing in Hengelo. Carbaat proved to be a wealthy man, in 1912 he had a country house built in Putten called "Villa Zandleven". Carbaat moved into the villa alongside Zandleven and his wife Janke. The trio moved to Rhenen in 1918, where a large seventeenth-century building on the Hoofdstraat was purchased.

Carbaat died in Rhenen on 24 May 1925 and was interred in the grave of his friend Zandleven and later his wife. In August 1925, Carbaat's bequeathed art collection was sold through the notary in Rhenen, this included a large number of Zandleven's paintings.

== Collections ==
Nineteen of Carbaat's works are held in the permanent collection of the Kröller Müller Museum. Carbaat's work is also held in the permanent collection of the Kunstmuseum Den Haag.
