= Carla de Jonge =

Jkvr. Carla de Jonge
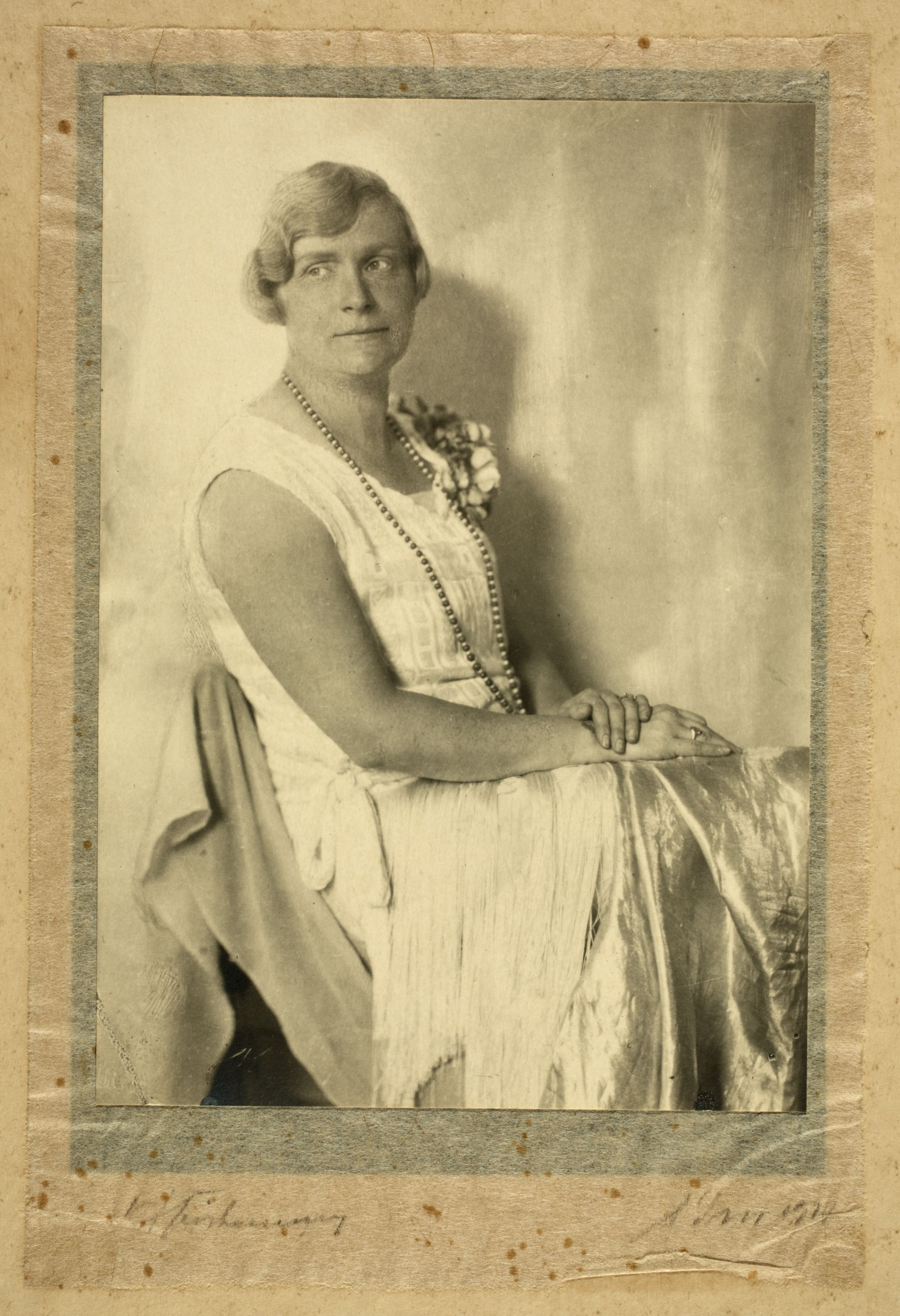
- ca. 1920
- Born: Caroline Henriette de Jonge; 23 March 1886; Dordrecht, Netherlands
- Died: 12 June 1972 (aged 86); The Hague, Netherlands
- Education: Leiden University; Utrecht University
- Occupations: art historian; museum director
- Organization: Rijkscommissie voor de Monumentenzorg
- Known for: Director, Centraal Museum

Jkvr. Carla de Jonge (1886–1972) was a Dutch art historian and museum director. From 1921, she was affiliated with the Centraal Museum in Utrecht, Netherlands, becoming its director in 1941. She played a significant role in the development of the Centraal Museum and the expansion of its collection. Her areas of expertise included the history of fashion and costume, as well as Dutch tiles and earthenware; she was internationally recognized as an expert in both fields.

== Early life and education ==
Caroline Henriette (nickname, "Carla") de Jonge was born in Dordrecht, Netherlands on 23 March 1886, to a noble family. She was the daughter of Willem Adriaan de Jonge and Wilhelmina Naletta van Rappard. Her father died in her early youth.

De Jonge attended high school in The Hague, where she had been living since 1894. Between 1904 and 1912, she studied Dutch language and literature at Leiden University. After her graduation, she decided to specialize in art history under Willem Vogelsang at Utrecht University, where she became Vogelsang's assistant in 1913. In the same year, she was actively involved in the preparation of the Utrecht exhibition on early Dutch painting and sculpture. With Vogelsang and Nicolaas Beets, she coauthored the accompanying catalog, Tentoonstelling van Noord-Nederlansche schilder- en beeldhouwkunst voor 1575.

In 1916, she obtained her doctoral degree with a dissertation on the history of the Dutch men's costume in the first half of the sixteenth century.

== Career ==
In 1917, De Jonge was appointed adjunct-commies tweede klasse at the Utrecht Municipal Archives under Samuel Muller Fz., who also was, until 1919, the director of the municipal museum collections in Utrecht. Muller was responsible for the setting up of the new Central Museum in the former Utrecht Agnieten monastery. De Jonge's 1917 appointment was related with this project. In addition, in 1918, she became an active member of the Rijkscommissie voor de Monumentenzorg and was charged with the description of monuments in the North-East of the province of North Brabant. De Jonge obtained the position of curator of the Central Museum, under director Willem C. Schuylenburg, in 1920. Muller, however, kept the responsibility for the arrangement of the display of the objects in the building. Following the opening of the museum, in 1921, the general display of the objects was sharply criticized. Schuylenburg and De Jonge then rearranged the galleries and began to describe the collections. In 1928, the comprehensive catalog of the historical department appeared, Catalogus van het Historisch Museum der stad, Centraal Museum Utrecht, followed, in 1933, by the critical catalog of paintings, Centraal Museum Utrecht, Catalogus der Schilderijen.

De Jonge had a special predilection for the Utrecht Old Masters. Between 1921 and 1938, no less than 27 paintings were added to the collection, including the Lochorst triptych of Jan van Scorel, on which De Jonge published a number of articles in Oud Holland and other periodicals. In 1938, her major study and oeuvre catalog on the Utrecht painter Paulus Moreelse appeared.

De Jonge also broadened the costume collection, which became the subject of several publications, as a follow up to her dissertation. Before the outbreak of World War II, part of the museum collection was stored in several hiding places. The museum soon reopened after having been closed during the German invasion, with a reduced display.

In 1941, following Schuylenburg's retirement, De Jonge was appointed director of the museum. In 1944, she was forced to mount an exhibition of modern art conforming to the ideology of the German occupation authorities. Later that year, De Jonge took the initiative to evacuate a further part of the collection. The museum then remained closed for more than a year. After the war, De Jonge set up an active exhibition program.

In 1951, she retired and moved to The Hague; she was succeeded by Elisabeth Houtzager (1907–2001). In 1952, De Jonge's revision of the 1933 Catalogus der Schilderijen appeared. In the same year, she was actively involved in the exhibition "La leggenda del filo d’oro", organized by the Centro Internazionale delle Arti e del Costume (now Centro studi di storia del tessuto, del costume e del profumo di palazzo Mocenigo) in Venice, Italy. In the field of decorative arts, she published on Delft ceramics (1965) and Dutch tiles (1971).

== Personal life and death ==
De Jonge never married. She died in The Hague on 12 June 1972.

== Selected works ==
- Bijdrage tot de kennis van de Noord-Nederlandse costuumgeschiedenis in de eerste helft van de zestiende eeuw. 1. Het mannencostuum. 1913. Proefschrift Universiteit Utrecht. (Digitale versie)
- Holländische Möbel und Raumkunst von 1650-1780. 1922. Stuttgart : Hoffmann.
- Sieraden. 1924. Rotterdam: W.L. & J. Brusse.
- Paulus Moreelse, portret- en genreschilder te Utrecht 1571-1638. 1938. Assen: Van Gorcum, 1938;
- Jan van Scorel. 1940. Amsterdam: Becht
- Een eeuw Nederlandsche mode. 1941. Amsterdam: Querido
- Oud-Nederlandsche majolica en Delftsch aardewerk: een ontwikkelingsgeschiedenis van omstreeks 1550-1800. Met medewerkering van H.W. Mauser. 1947. Amsterdam : Scheltema en Holkema
- Delfts aardewerk. 1965. Rotterdam: Nijgh & Van Ditmar.
  - Delfter Keramik. 1969. Tübingen: Wasmuth
  - Delft ceramics. 1970. London: Pall Mall Press
- Nederlandse tegels.1971. Amsterdam: De Bussy.
  - Dutch tiles. 1971. New York: Praeger
