= Van Baaren Museum =

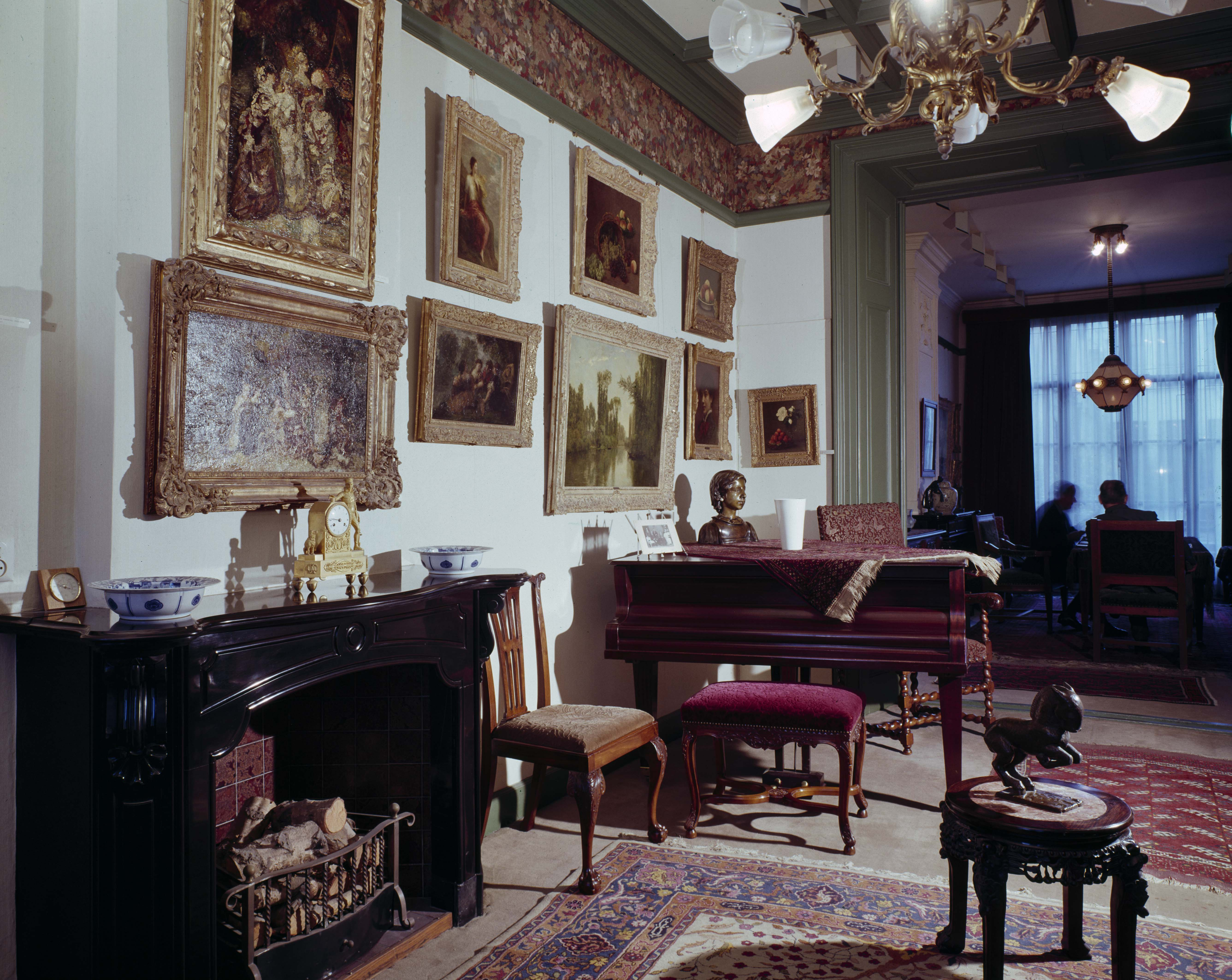
- The museum as seen in 1976
- Established: 1964 (museum)
- Dissolved: 1980
- Location: Oudegracht 317; Utrecht, Netherlands

Van Baaren Museum was a museum located in a canalside house alongside the Oudegracht in Utrecht, Netherlands. The museum was named after the brother (Lambertus) and sister (Josephina) duo that lived in the house and founded the museum.

== History ==
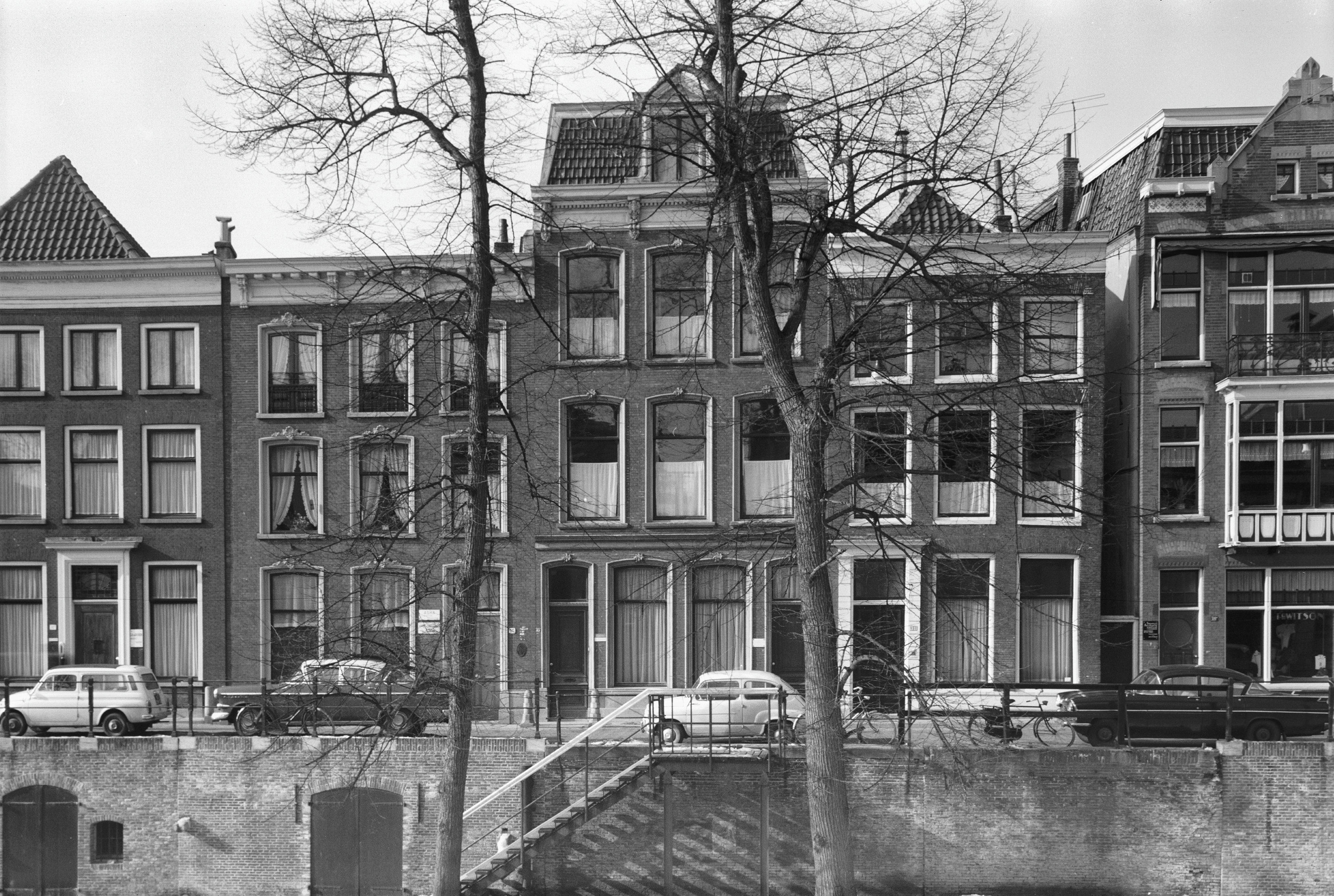
The houses seen with their canal cellars in 1976. On the far left is the Van Baaren Museum with signage (illegible).

The canal house itself where the museum resided was built in the 18th century. The Van Barens moved there in the 1950s as their collection expanded. Lambertus had made a fortune in real estate and together they purchased art according to their individual tastes. They created a foundation when they decided to found a museum in this new home for their 400 artworks. Josephina died in 1959 and her brother died in 1964. Two years later the museum opened. In 1980 the house was sold in two parts; the canal cellar was sold as a separate unit. The art is on loan to the Centraal Museum.
