= Tine Honig =

Dutch artist (1894–1957)

- Born: Catharina Margaretha Honig; 10 December 1894; Koog aan de Zaan, Netherlands
- Died: 10 March 1957 (aged 62); Haarlem, Netherlands
- Known for: Painting

Catharina Margaretha Honig (1894-1957) was a Dutch painter known for her still lifes.

== Biography ==
Honig was born on 10 December 1894 in Koog aan de Zaan. She studied at the Rijksakademie van beeldende kunsten (State Academy of Fine Arts) in Amsterdam. Her teachers included Félicien Bobeldijk and Coba Ritsema. Honig's work was included in the 1939 exhibition and sale Onze Kunst van Heden (Our Art of Today) at the Rijksmuseum in Amsterdam.

Honig died on 10 March 1957 in Haarlem.
