= Simon Moulijn =

Dutch painter

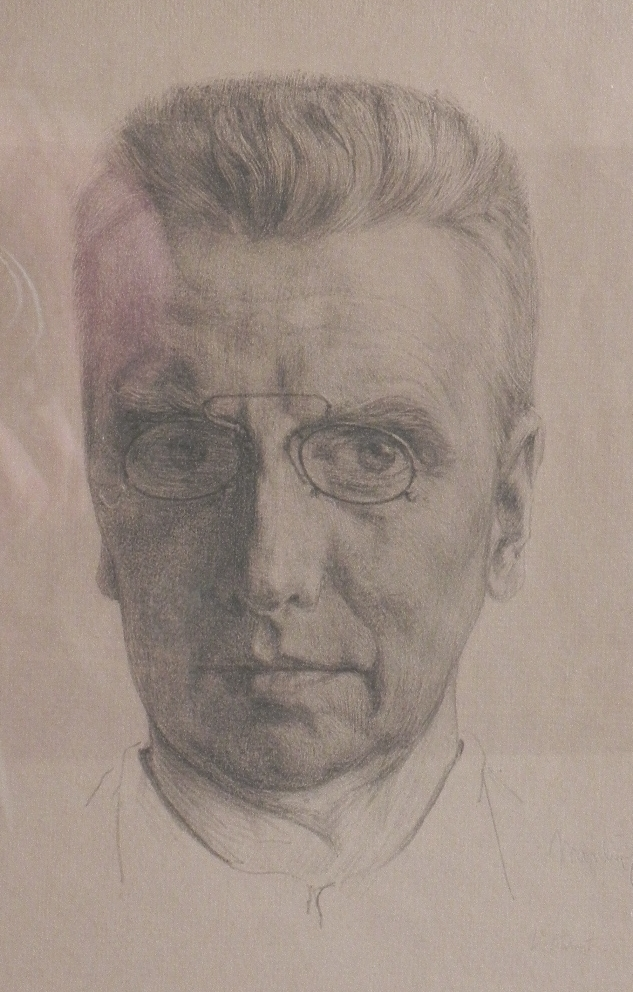
S. Moulijn (1920) self-portrait

Simon Moulijn (20 July 1866 – 2 November 1948) was a Dutch painter, draughtsman and graphic artist. He was one of the eminent visual artists of his time and became especially well known for his lithographic works.

== Biography ==
Simon Moulijn was born in Rotterdam as a son of the manufacturer and merchant Simon Moulijn senior and his second wife Magdalena Maria Johanna Walter. Despite initial doubts of his parents Simon Moulijn started 1882 an education at the Rotterdam Academy of Arts (Rotterdamsche Academie voor Beeldende Kunsten en Technische Wetenschappen, today “Willem de Koning Academy Rotterdam University of applied sciences”). From 1885 onward he continued his studies at the Rijksakademie voor beeldende kunsten (State Academy of fine arts). In this period he met other artists as Ferdinand Hart Nibbrig, Richard Roland Holst and Isaac Israëls.

After the end of his formal education in the year 1887 a period of artistic search and wandering around followed. He lived and worked in various places in the province Drenthe, in Rotterdam, in The Hague, in De Steeg near Arnhem, where he shared a studio with the painter Edzard Koning and in Renkum. He married 12 March 1902 the poet Hester Henriëtte Jacoba Haitsma-Mulier.

The couple settled in Laren (North Holland). At that time many artists and fellow students from the academy in Amsterdam already lived there. His house “d’Eglantier” was built after Moulijn's own design in 1903. Two sons were born in the years 1904 and 1908. In the year 1917 Moulijn was appointed as a teacher at the Rotterdamsche Academie voor Beeldende Kunsten en Technische Wetenschappen (Rotterdam Academy) and the family moved to The Hague.

After his retirement as a teacher (1932) Moulijn lived and worked from 1935 until 1944 in Wassenaar. In 1946 he and his wife moved in with their eldest son in The Hague. Moulijn died 2 November 1948. His wife died a month later (1 December 1948). Both are buried at the graveyard of the village church in Wassenaar.

== Works ==
During the period of his artistic search Simon Moulijn followed the examples set by the modern French painters as well as Jan Toorop and Vincent van Gogh. The Symbolism of the Belgian philosopher Maurice Maeterlinck also strongly influenced his work. Moulijn himself writes about this period in the year 1913: “his mysticism led me to distort nature in a barbaric way”

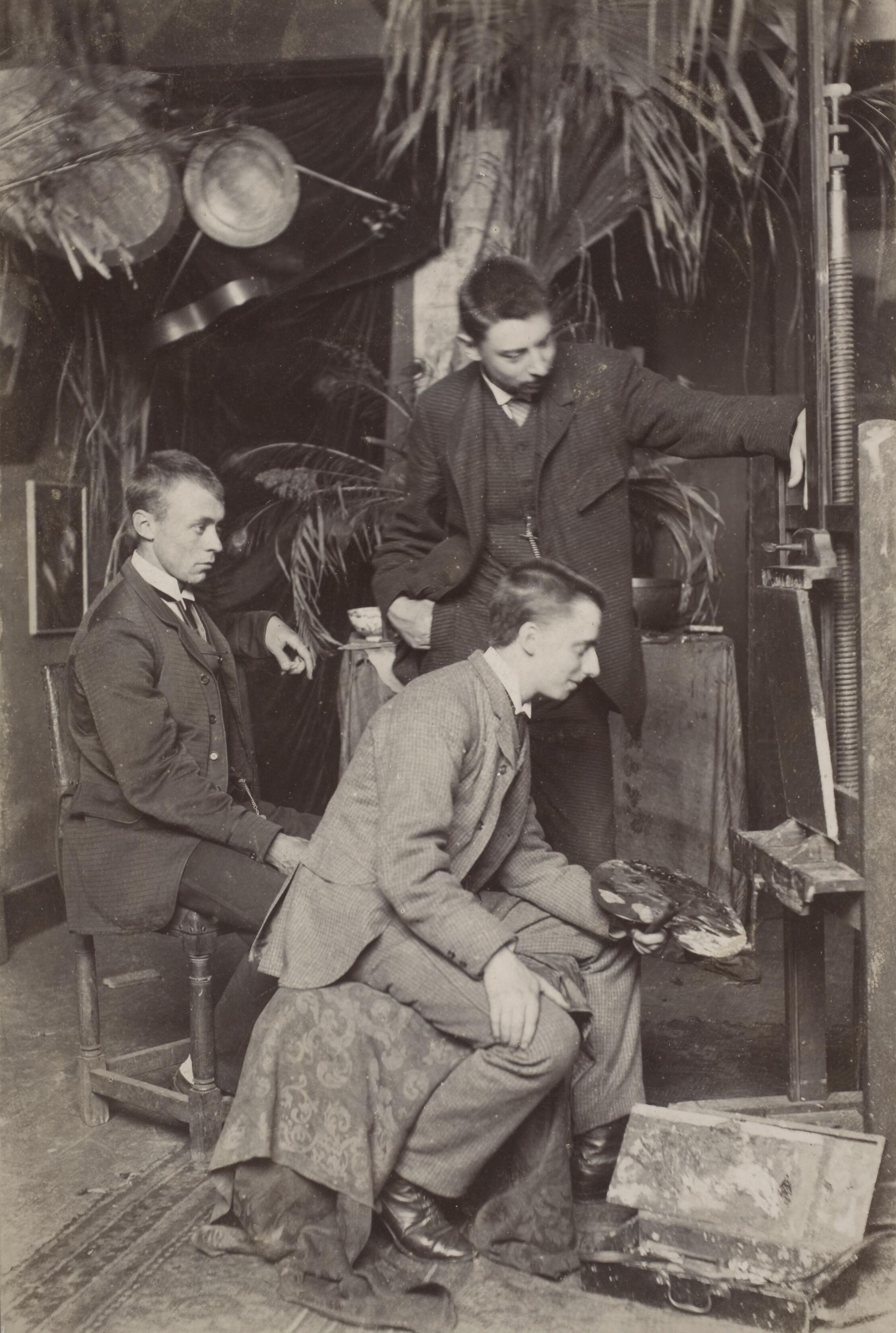
P. C. de Moor (left) Simon Moulijn (with palette) D. Wiggers (standing) at the Rotterdam Academy (±1884?)

Although in later work Symbolism often shows through, Moulijn developed around 1893-1894 an own artistic style and figurative language. His first big success was the one man exposition in the Hôtel de l’Art Nouveau of S. Bing in Paris during summer 1896. Always in search for new inspiration Moulijn travelled much. He worked amongst other places in the Dutch provinces Drenthe, North Brabant, Gelderland (Guelders), Zeeland and in the southern part of Limburg. His journeys also led him abroad and he worked in Germany (among other places in Monschau and Holzhausen 1905, Todtnau 1922), in Switzerland (Kandersteg 1926), In Italy (among other places Tivoli (Villa d’Este) and Frascati 1911, Florence 1938), in Luxemburg (Beaufort 1913), in France (among other places Fontainebleau 1930, Versailles 1930 and 1934, Neuilly 1931, various places along the river Oise (among other at Royaumont Abbey) 1939 and in the Alpes Maritimes 1938). The result of these journeys was a large number of paintings, drawings and lithographs.

Moulijn's fascination for nature and the various forms and atmospheres of landscape is one of the main themes of his work. Apart from his first paintings in academic style his independent development began with the simplifying nearly abstract sceneries influenced by symbolism and a certain mysticism. But over the years he finds more and more towards “a Dutch realism”. His development as an artist shows his love for nature but also his personal need to keep nature in a way under control. Therefore, many of his paintings and lithographs show woods from a certain distance or even behind a wall. He also loved parks with their controlled nature. His way of reproducing various landscapes also shows one of his main characteristics as “Painter of the romantic loneliness”. About the end of the 1920s Moulijn started again to paint and draw more regularly portraits.

In the year 1893 Moulijn made his first lithographs. Over the years the occupation of Moulijn with drawing on stone grew more intensive and lithography was more and more in the centre of attention in his work. The main part in his stone drawings is played by peaceful rivers, woods, parks, but also fortresses and lively, urban landscapes of the harbour of his native town Rotterdam. In total the complete works comprise 189 lithographs. Moulijn's use of lithography also influenced his way of painting and the execution of works in these fully different techniques gave him a special position in the Dutch art scene of the first half of the twentieth century.

Moulijn also created drafts for book covers, drawings, etchings, wood engravings and commercial art. He illustrated several books of fairytales by the author Marie Marx-Koning.

Apart from a large number of articles in several journals and art catalogues Moulijn has written two books: “De lithografische Prentkunst” (“The lithographic picture art”, De Wereldbibliotheek, Amsterdam 1918) and “De eerste jaren van de lithographische prentkunst in Nederland” (“The first years of the lithographic picture art in the Netherlands”, Martinus Nijhoff, The Hague, 1927). He founded 1910 together with his friend the painter F. Hart Nibbrig in Laren a painting school. In 1911 he was co-founder of the “Vereeniging tot Bevordering der Grafische Kunst” (Association for the promotion of de graphic art) and became secretary of the association.

As one of the important Dutch artists of his time he often participated in the organisation of exhibitions of Dutch art and especially graphic art in the Netherlands and abroad. Among others he was co-organiser of the graphic exhibition in Leipzig (Germany) in 1914 and an important exhibition of Dutch fine arts in Brighton 1920. It was in Brighton where he met the British lithographer John Copley and made friends with him. In 1934 Moulijn earned special merits for his part in the organisation of an Exhibition of Dutch fine arts in Budapest.

== Public collections ==
Among the public collections holding works of Simon Moulijn are:

- Drents museum in Assen
- Rijksprentenkabinet (part of the Rijksmuseum) in Amsterdam
- Gemeentemuseum Den Haag in The Hague
- Museum Boymans van Beuningen in Rotterdam
- Kröller-Müller-Museum near Otterlo
- Centraal Museum in Utrecht
- Dordrechts Museum in Dordrecht
- British Museum in London
- Bibliothèque Nationale in Paris
- Albertina in Vienna

== Honors ==
- 1915 Panama-Pacific International Exposition in San Francisco: Bronze medal
- 1923 Exhibition of Dutch artists in the field of fine arts in Amsterdam: Silver medal
- 1928 Member of the Jury of the Olympic games in Amsterdam: Silver medal
- 1934 Budapest: Silver plaque
- 1934 Ungarian officer cross of merit
- 1938 Knight grand cross in the Order of Oranje-Nassau.
