= Marie de Jonge =

Dutch artist (1872–1951)

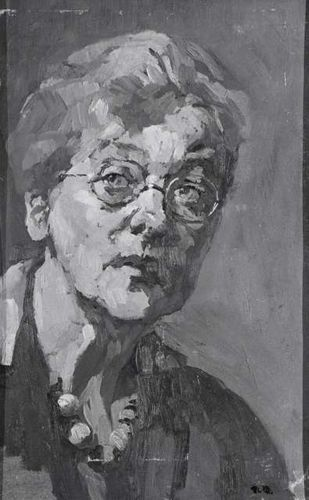
- Portrait of de Jonge, c. 1900–1924
- Born: 24 December 1872; Amersfoort, Netherlands
- Died: 19 March 1951 (aged 78); Zutphen, Netherlands
- Other name: Eva Maria Alida de Jonge
- Known for: Painting

Eva Maria Alida de Jonge (1872–1951) was a Dutch painter.

== Biography ==
De Jonge was born on 24 December 1872 in Amersfoort. She studied at the Akademie van beeldende kunsten (Den Haag) (Royal Academy of Art, The Hague) and the Rijksakademie van beeldende kunsten (State Academy of Fine Arts). Her teachers included Lucien Simon and Nicolaas van der Waay.

De Jonge's work was included in the 1939 exhibition and sale Onze Kunst van Heden (Our Art of Today) at the Rijksmuseum in Amsterdam. De Jonge taught at the Internationaal schildersatelier in Amsterdam. Her students included Maria Anna Bleeker, Marianne Franken, Elise Itzkovitch-Kann, Gustave van Kan, Cornelia Rambonnet, and Victoire Wirix. She was a member of Arti et Amicitiae and the Pulchri Studio.

De Jonge died on 19 March 1951 in Zutphen.
