= Lize Duyvis =

Dutch artist

- Born: Erica Louise Duyvis; 12 December 1889; Utrecht, Netherlands
- Died: 5 August 1964 (aged 78); Apeldoorn, Netherlands
- Other names: Lize Hooft Hasselaar-Duyvis
- Known for: Painting
- Spouse: H.C. Hooft Hasselaar

Lize Duyvis (1889-1964) was a Dutch painter.

== Biography ==
Duyvis was born on 12 December 1889 in Utrecht. She studied with Coba Ritsema, Willem Elisa Roelofs, Jr. (Dutch, 1874–1940), and Jan Adam Zandleven. In 1915 she married H.C. Hooft Hasselaar. Duyvis was a member of, and exhibited with, the Kunstenaarsvereniging Sint Lucas. Her work was included in the 1939 exhibition and sale Onze Kunst van Heden (Our Art of Today) at the Rijksmuseum in Amsterdam.

Duyvis died on 5 August 1964 in Apeldoorn.
