= Gonda Wulfse =

Dutch artist

- Born: Allegonda Jacoba Catharina Wulfse; 28 September 1896; Zwijndrecht, Netherlands
- Died: 23 November 1979 (aged 83); Amsterdam, Netherlands
- Known for: Painting

Allegonda "Gonda" Jacoba Catharina Wulfse (1896-1979) was a Dutch artist.

== Biography ==
Wulfse was born on 28 September 1896 in Zwijndrecht. She studied in Paris, France at the Montparnasse Academy, and in Munich, Germany. Her teachers included Salomon Garf and Coba Ritsema. Her work was included in the 1939 exhibition and sale Onze Kunst van Heden (Our Art of Today) at the Rijksmuseum in Amsterdam. She was a member of the Arti et Amicitiae, De Onafhankelijken (The Independents), Kunstenaarsvereniging Sint Lucas, and Genootschap Kunstliefde.

Wulfse died on 23 November 1979 in Amsterdam.
