= Victoire Wirix =

Dutch artist

- Born: 28 June 1875; Maastricht, Netherlands
- Died: 8 February 1938 (aged 62) 's-Graveland (now Wijdemeren), Netherlands
- Other name: Victoire Leonhardt-Wirix
- Known for: Painting

Victoire Wirix (1875–1938) was a Dutch artist.

== Biography ==
Wirix was born on 28 June 1875 in Maastricht. She studied at the Rijksakademie van beeldende kunsten and the Internationaal schildersatelier. Her teachers included Carel Dake, Abraham Frans Gips, Marie de Jonge, Martin Monnickendam, Gerard Overman (1855-1906), Coba Ritsema, Adriaan Terhell and Nicolaas van der Waay. She was a member of the Arti et Amicitiae.

Wirix died on 8 February 1938 in 's-Graveland (now Wijdemeren).

== Gallery ==
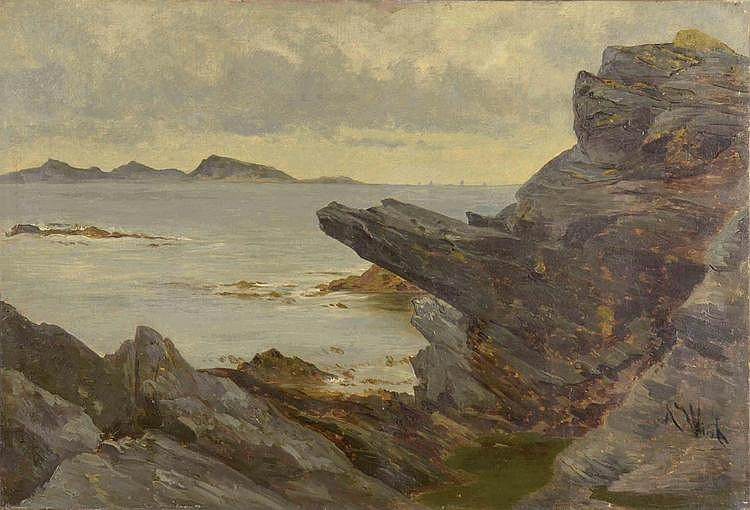
Seaside

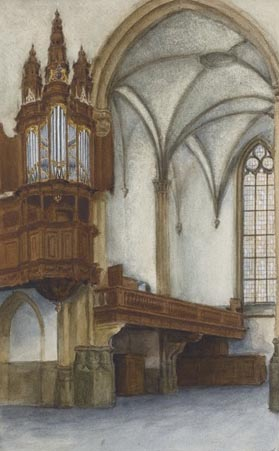
View of the organ in the Nieuwe Kerk, Amsterdam
