= Jacoba Surie =

Dutch painter

- Self portrait 1918
- Born: 5 September 1879; Amsterdam, Netherlands
- Died: 5 February 1970 (aged 90); Amsterdam, Netherlands
- Known for: Painting

Jacoba Surie (5 September 1879 – 5 February 1970) was a Dutch painter.

Surie was born in Amsterdam and trained at the Rijksakademie van beeldende kunsten there, where she studied under Joseph Mendes da Costa. She was a member of Arti et Amicitiae and the Pulchri Studio. She is considered one of the Amsterdamse Joffers. Her work was also part of the painting event in the art competition at the 1928 Summer Olympics.

Surie died in Amsterdam and was buried in Zorgvlied.

Her work is in the collections of the Stedelijk Museum Amsterdam, Gemeentemuseum Den Haag and Gemeentemuseum Helmond.
