= Jan Adam Zandleven =

Dutch painter

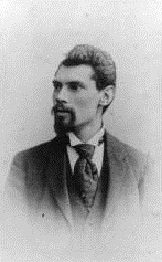
Jan Adam Zandleven (1895)

Jan Adam Zandleven (6 February 1868, Koog aan de Zaan – 16 July 1923, Rhenen) was a Dutch painter, mostly of landscapes and still-lifes.

== Biography ==
He was the son of a paint manufacturer and merchant. Although he always wanted to be an artist, he never took formal lessons and worked for his father's company until 1901, when some of his works received positive reviews from Paul Gabriël and Jozef Israëls. Despite continuing opposition from his father, he chose to become a painter and made the acquaintance of the art dealer, Henk Bremmer, who gave him advice and financial support, as well as introducing him to the art collector, Helene Kröller-Müller, who became a major patron.

In 1904, he and his wife settled in Gorssel, lived briefly in Hengelo, then moved to Putten, near the Veluwe in 1912, where he spent much of his time painting in the woods; sometimes accompanied by his friend, the still-life painter Jan Carbaat. A deeply religious man, this would often produce a state akin to meditation and the degree of his concentration is clearly visible in his attention to small details. The influence of Impressionism is obvious, but his technique was more closely related to Pointillism.

Between 1916 and 1922, he exhibited regularly at the "Kunsthandel Gerbrands" in Utrecht. After 1918, he lived in Rhenen, where he died. Major retrospectives have been held at the Stedelijk Museum in 1929 and, more recently, at the Museum Flehite in 2012.

== Selected paintings ==
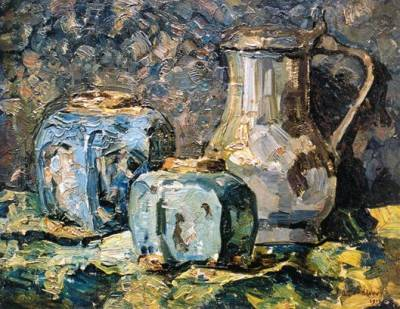
Still-life with Tin Can and
Ginger Jars

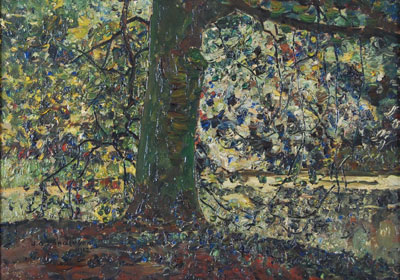
Beech at a Forest Pool

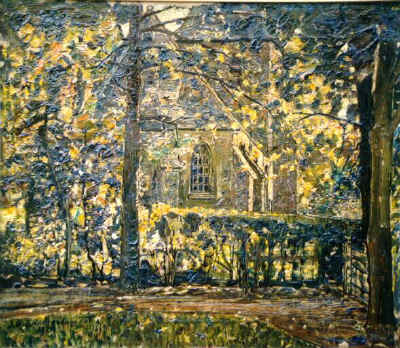
Church in the Sun

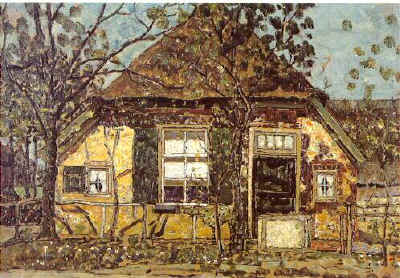
Front of a Farm
