= Suze Robertson =

Dutch painter (1855-1922)

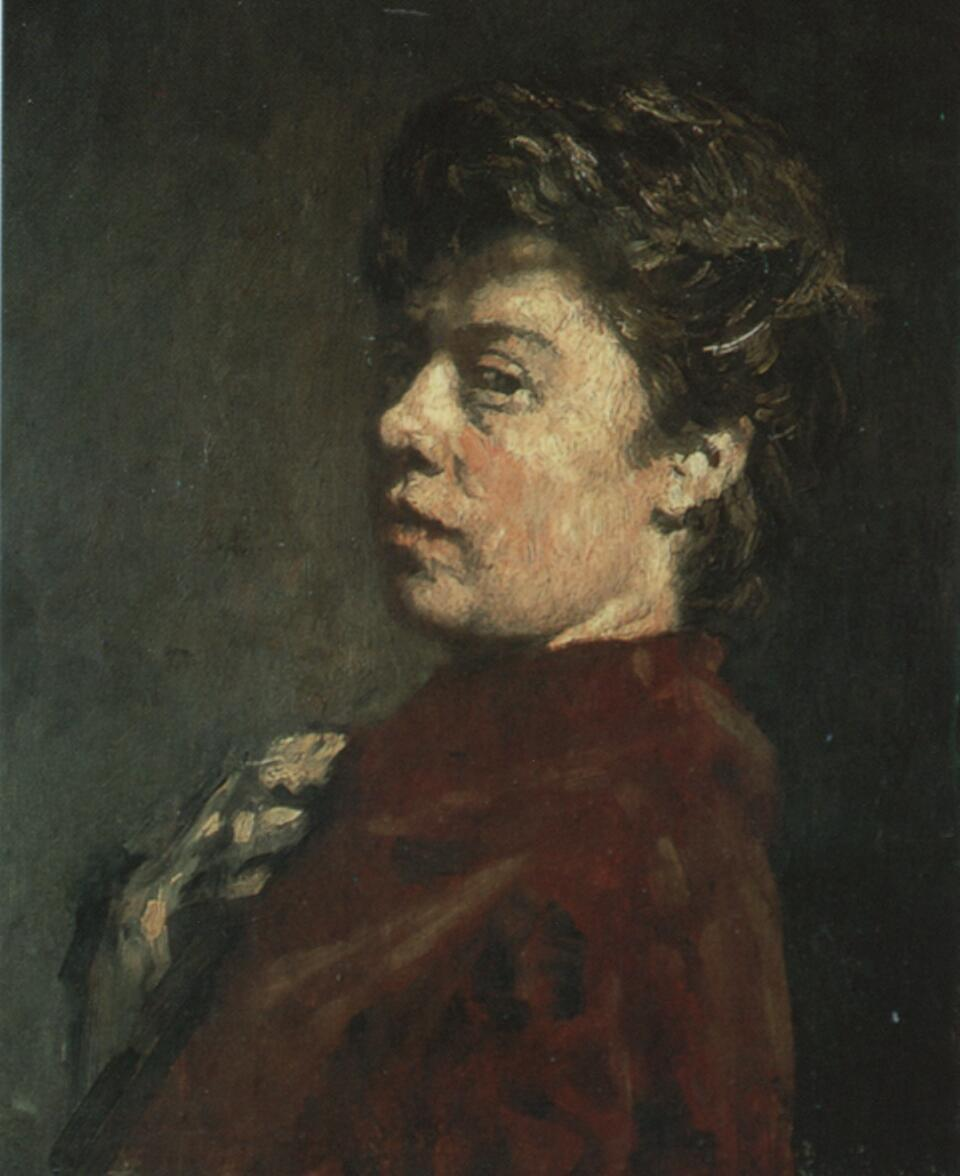
- Self-portrait, 1890
- Born: December 17, 1855; The Hague, Netherlands.
- Died: November 18, 1922 (aged 66); The Hague, Netherlands
- Known for: Painting
- Spouse: Richard Bisschop (m. 1892)

Suze Robertson (17 December 1855 – 18 October 1922) was a Dutch painter. She belonged to a group of artists known as the Amsterdamse Joffers.

== Biography ==
Suze Robertson was born to a family of merchants. Her mother died when she was two and she was raised by her aunt and uncle. She displayed an early talent for drawing and began her studies in 1874 at the Royal Academy of Art, The Hague, where she was a pupil of Jan Philip Koelman. She won a bronze and two silver medals there. In 1876 she followed drawing lessons at the Polytechnical School in Delft.

Until 1882 she taught drawing lessons for girls in Rotterdam while taking lessons on Sundays from Petrus van der Velden in The Hague, and after that chose a career as an artist. Her works of simple people in farm interiors and rough scenes of farm life are reminiscent of Van Gogh's early The Potato Eaters and it is said they admired each other's work.

While in Rotterdam Suze Robertson caused something of a scandal because she insisted her pupils should be able to draw from the naked model. She married the painter Richard Bisschop in 1892, and became a member of the Pulchri studio and Arti et Amicitiae. Over the next few years, she exhibited widely and won several medals, including a bronze at the Exposition Universelle (1900). In 1907 her work was shown at the opening sale of the new branch of the Larensche Kunsthandel in Amsterdam where she sold works totalling 10,000 guilders, at the time something of a record. She died in The Hague.

== Paintings ==
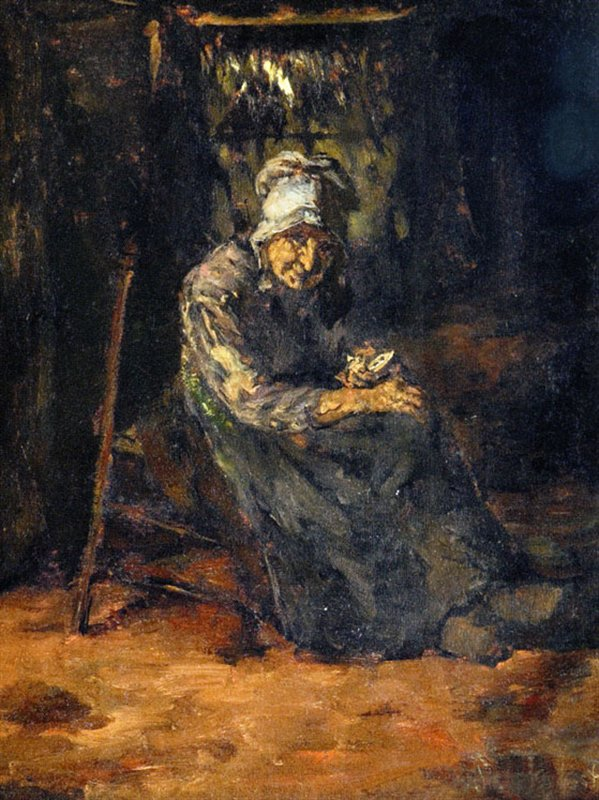
S. Robertson, The card reader, 1883, oil on canvas mounted on panel, Stedelijk Museum Breda

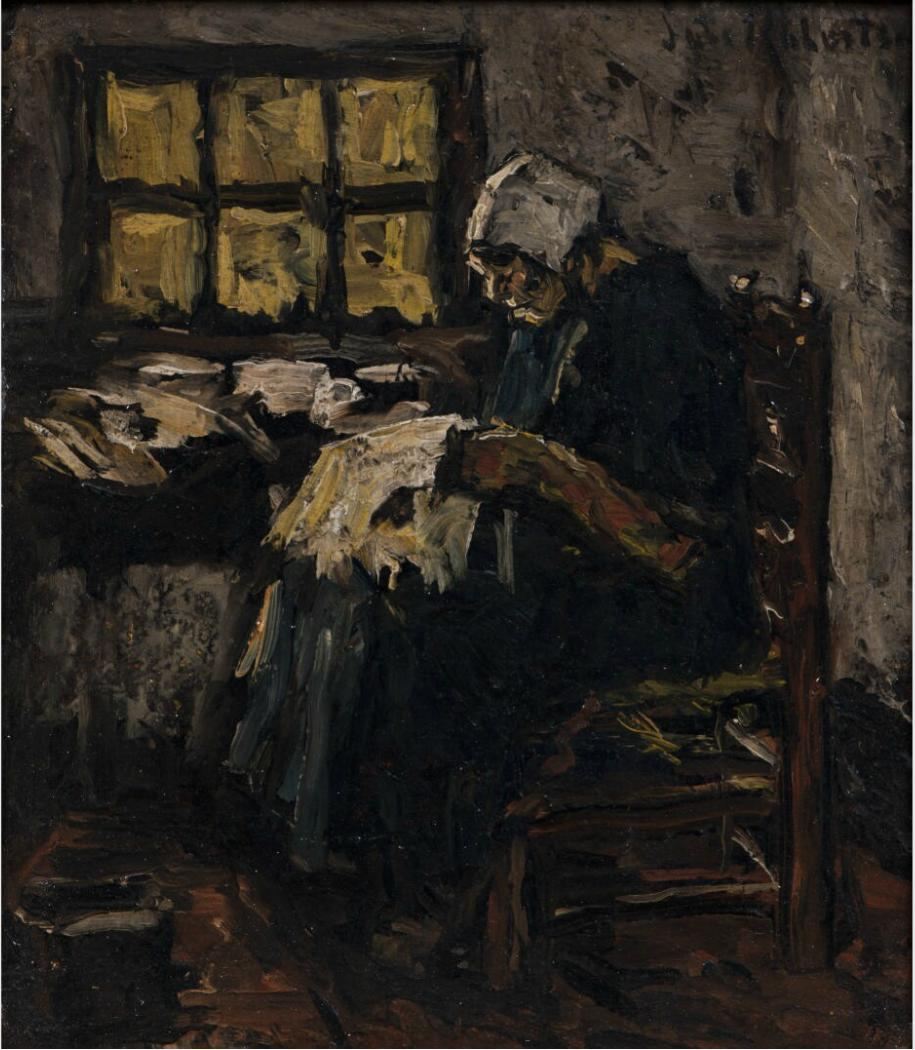
S. Robertson, Women sewing, 1886–89, oil on panel, Gemeentemuseum Helmond

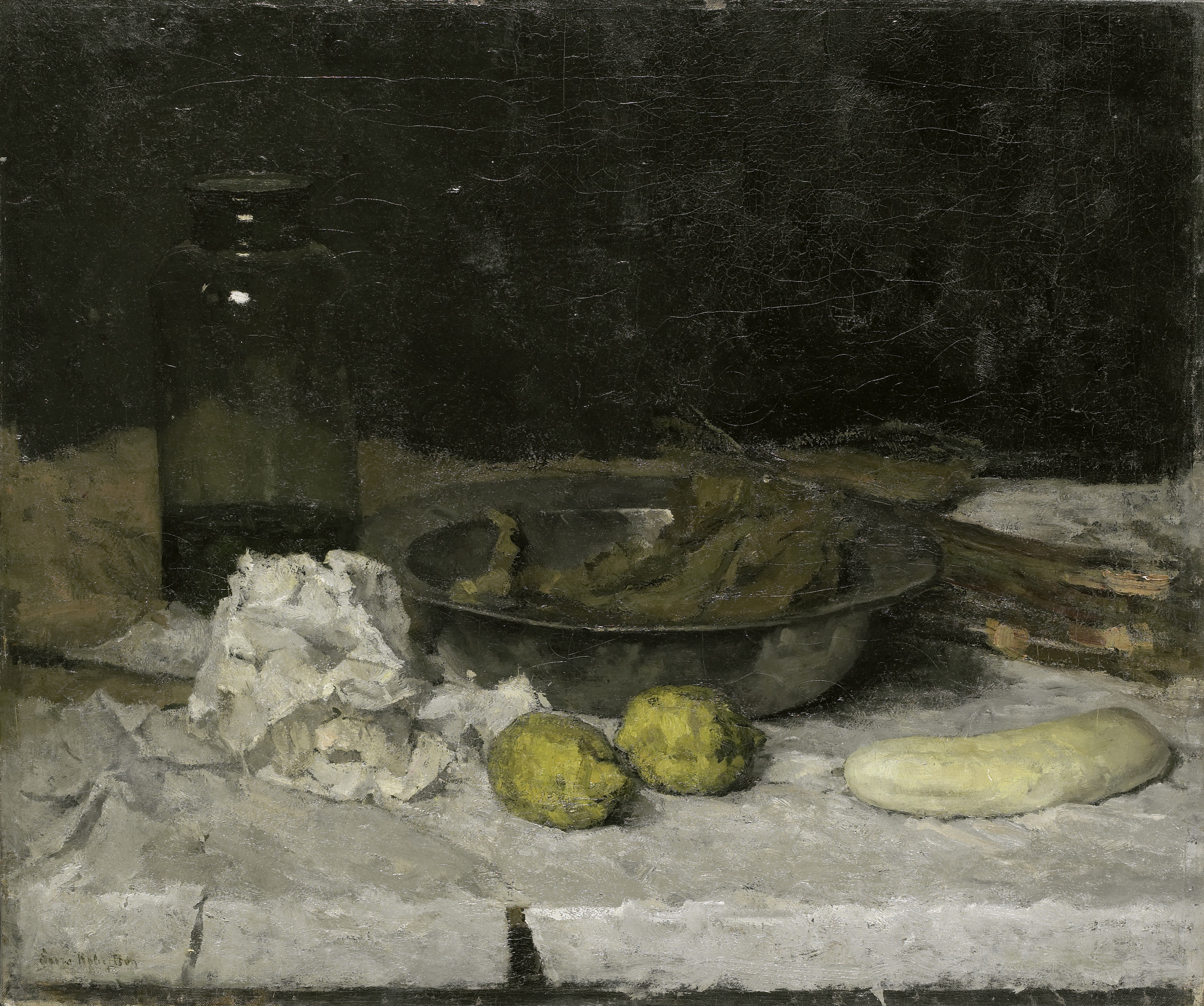
S. Robertson, Still Life, 1892, oil-painting on canvas, Rijksmuseum

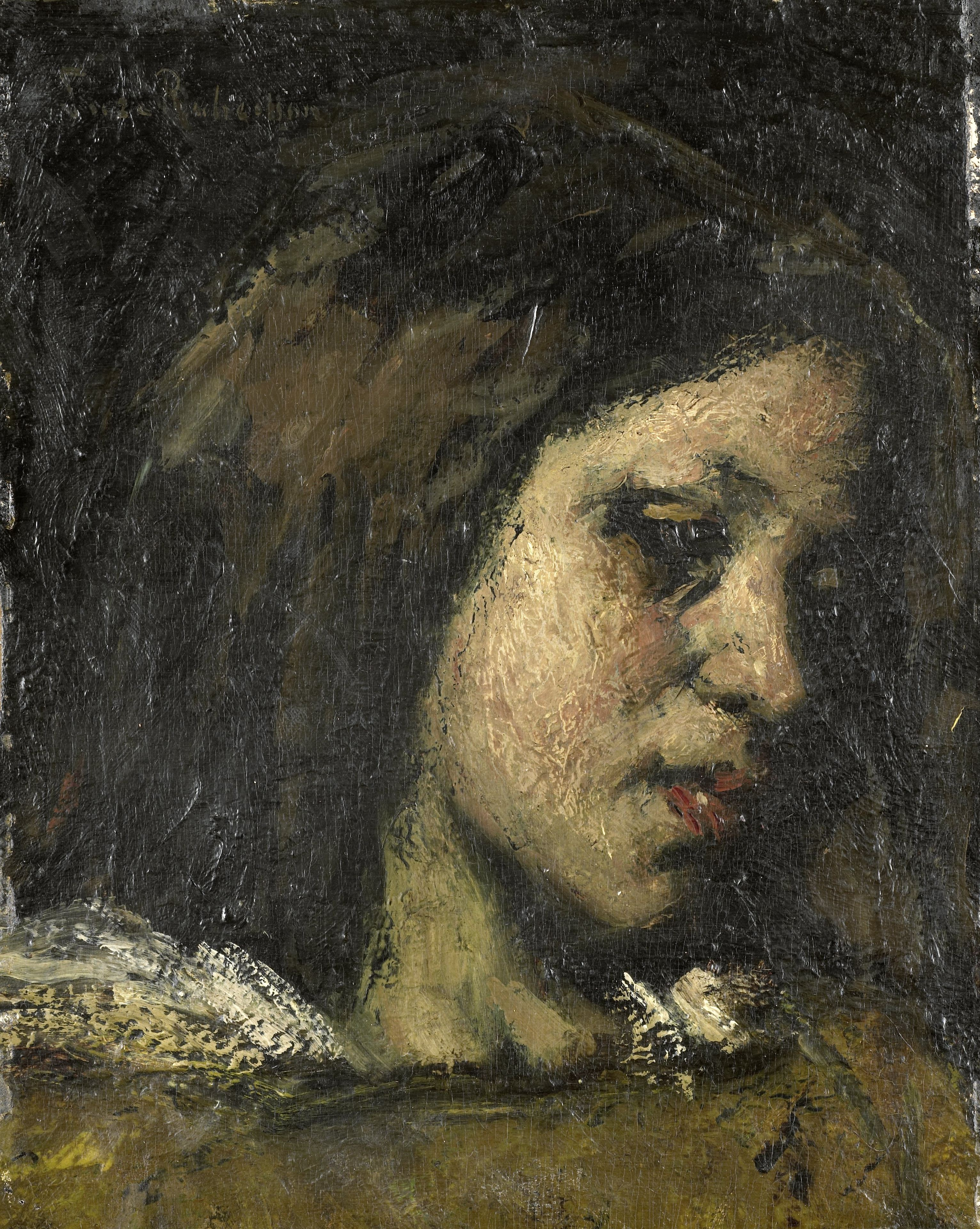
S. Robertson, Portrait of a Young Lady, 1895–98; oil on canvas, Rijksmuseum

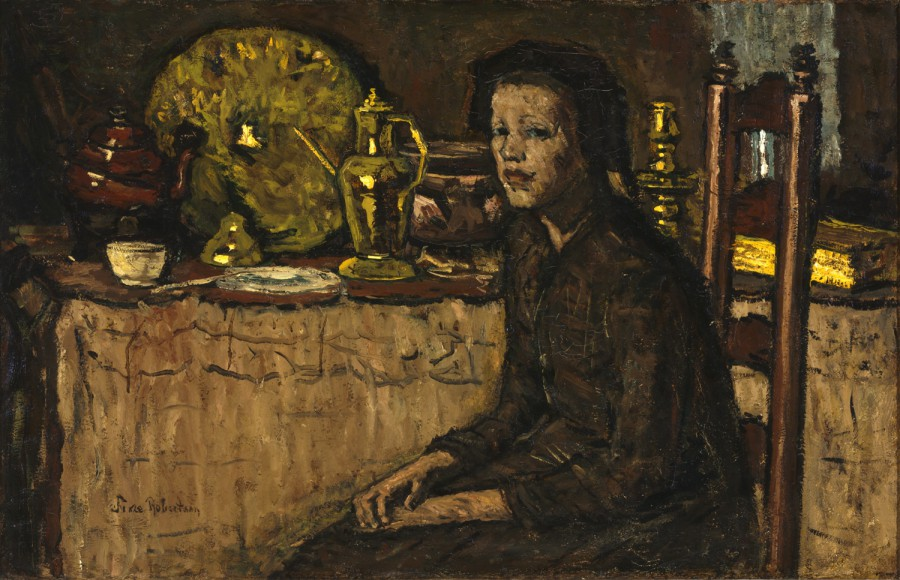
S. Robertson, Antique Stall, c. 1900, oil on canvas, Centraal Museum, Utrecht

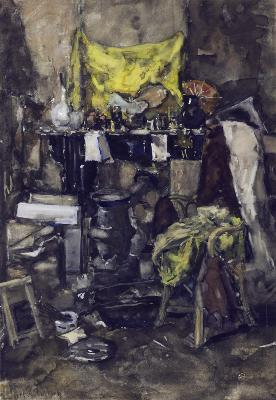
S. Robertson, Corner of the Artists' Studio, before 1905, watercolor on paper, Groninger Museum

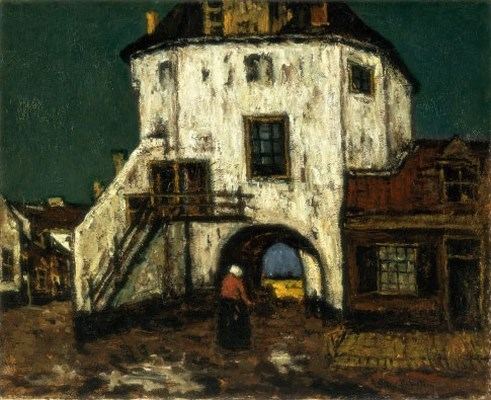
S. Robertson, The Fisher's gate at Harderwijk, 1908–10, oil on canvas, Stedelijk Museum Amsterdam

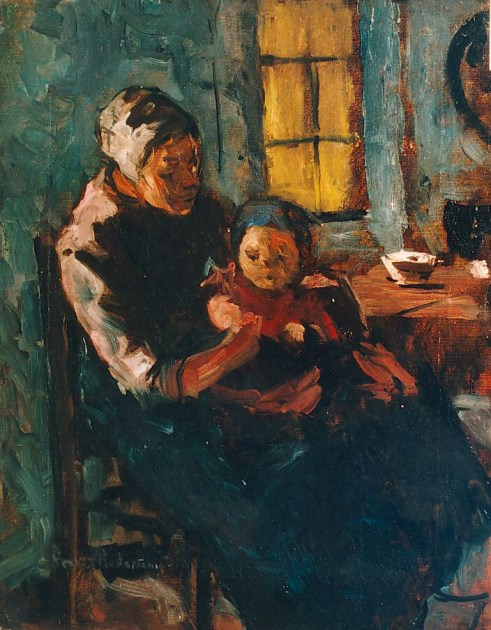
S. Robertson, Mother and child, c. 1910s, oil on canvas, private collection

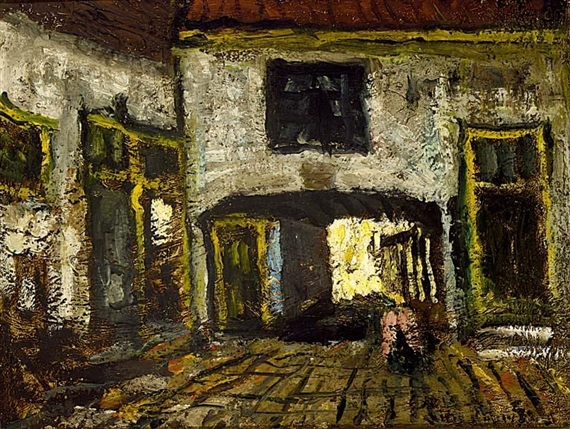
S. Robertson, Courtyard together with a Work by Johan Buning, before 1922, oil on panel, private collection

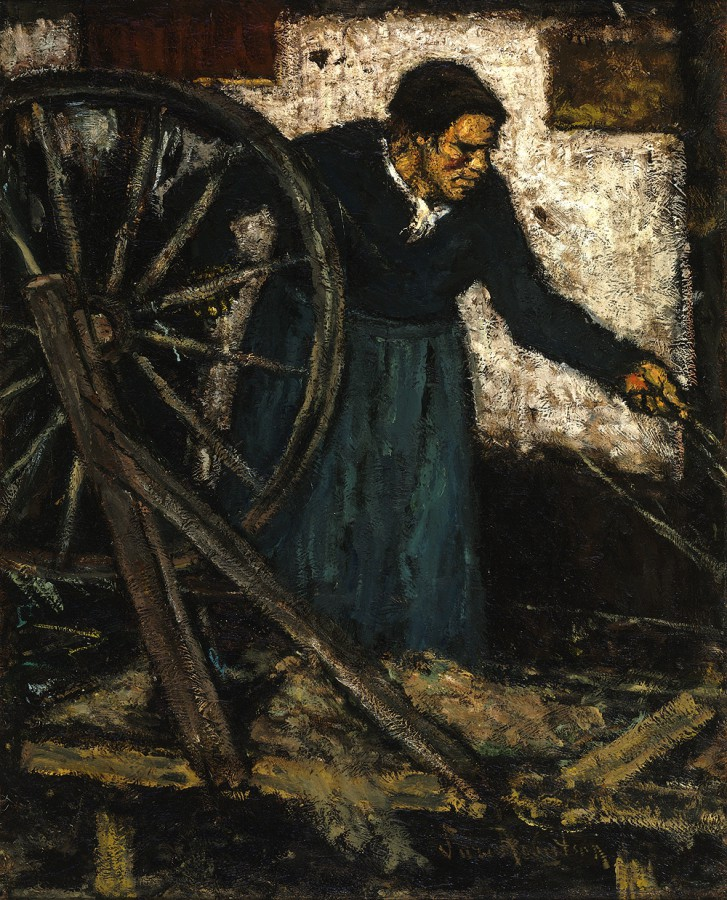
S. Robertson, Standing woman spinning, undated, oil on canvas
