= Centraal Museum =

Museum in Utrecht, Netherlands

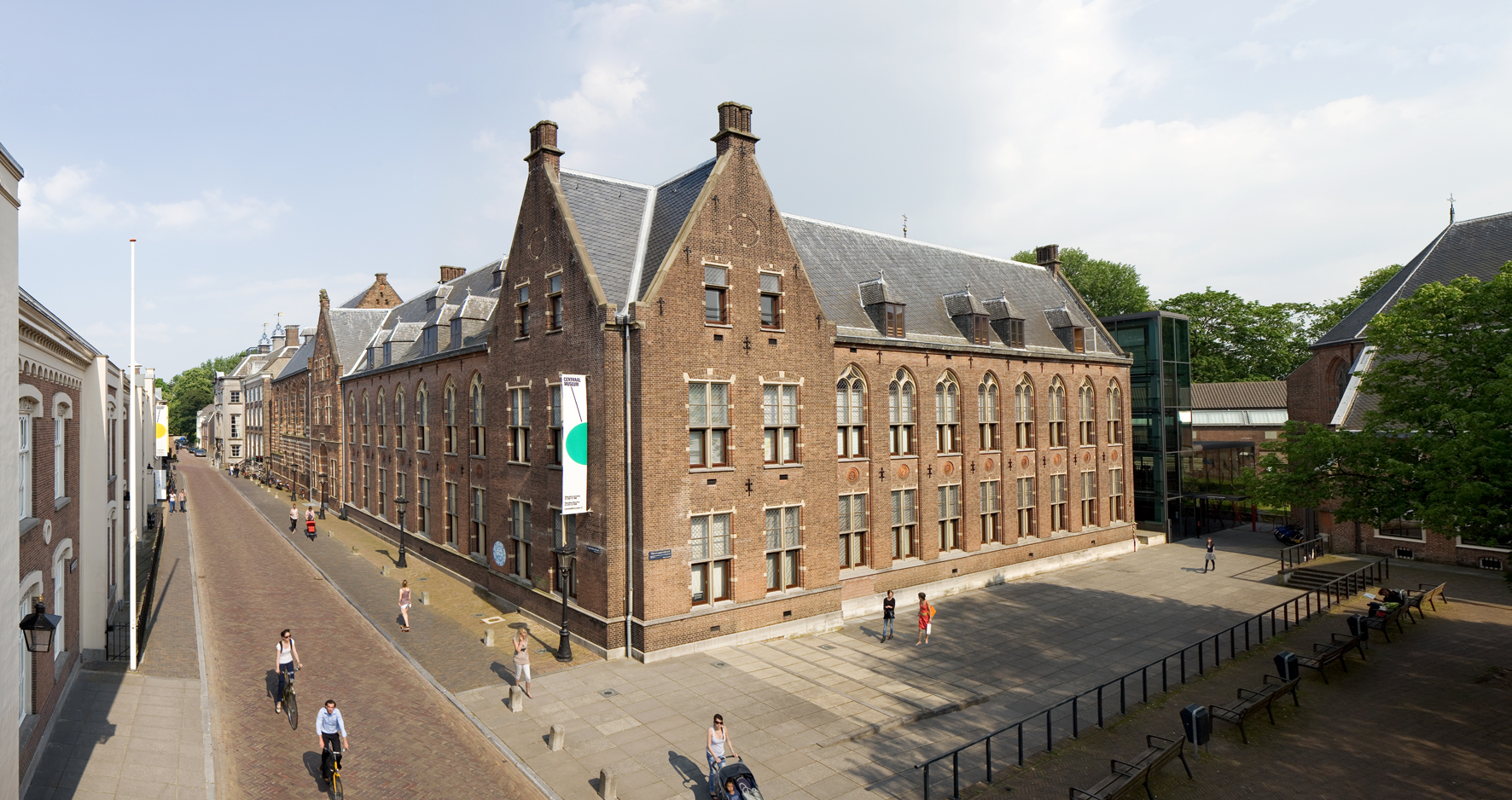
- The main building at centre; the Dick Bruna huis is on the left, with the yellow banner
- Interactive fullscreen map
- Location: Utrecht, Netherlands
- Coordinates: 52°05′00″N 5°07′33″E

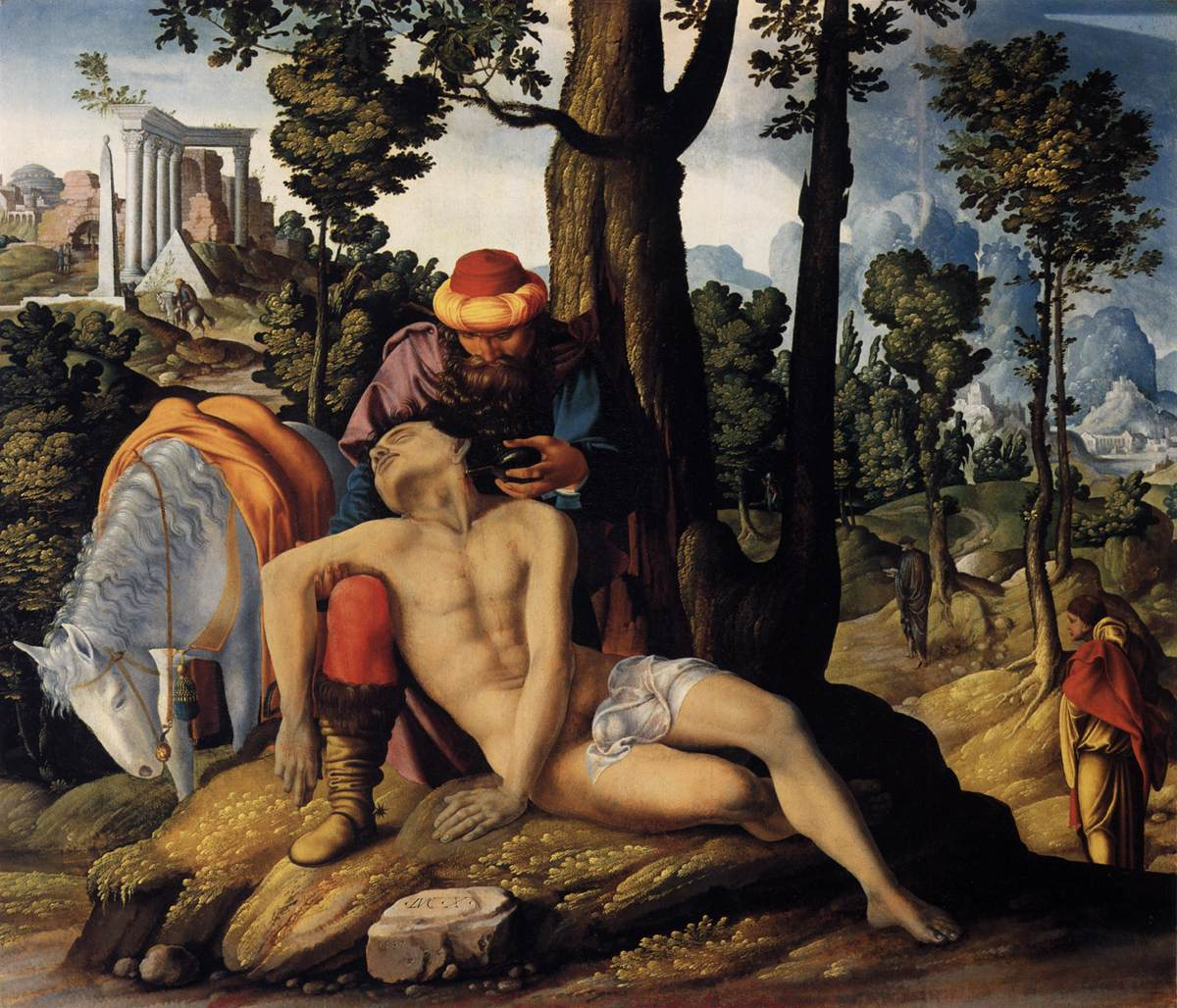
The good Samaritan, 1537

The Centraal Museum is the main museum in Utrecht, Netherlands, founded in 1838. The museum has a wide-ranging collection, mainly of works produced locally. The collection of the paintings by the Northern Mannerist Joachim Wtewael is by a long way the largest anywhere in the world. Other highlights are many significant paintings by the Utrecht Caravaggisti, such as Gerard van Honthorst and Hendrick ter Brugghen. Both of them travelled to Rome in the early 17th century to study the works of the Italian master Caravaggio. In the previous generation, as well as Wtewael, Abraham Bloemaert and the portraitist Paulus Moreelse were the most significant Utrecht painters, with Jan van Scorel still earlier.

== History ==
Initially, the collection - exhibited on the top floor of the Utrecht town hall - was limited to art related to the city of Utrecht. In 1921 the collection merged with various private collections in the new 'centralised museum' (hence the name 'Centraal museum', centraal being the Dutch word for central) located in the former medieval monastery at the Nicolaaskerkhof. Currently, the collection comprises pre-1850 art, modern art, applied art, fashion and the city history of Utrecht.

Since 1980, the museum includes the collection of the Van Baaren Museum and since 2006, the museum also runs the Miffy Museum, a museum across the street dedicated to Dick Bruna and his rabbit character Miffy. It also runs the Rietveld Schröder House, a famous Modernist house built in 1924 by the Dutch architect Gerrit Rietveld for Mrs. Truus Schröder-Schräder and her three children, which is now owned by the museum and open to the public (prebooking usually needed).

== Highlights ==
Amongst the highlights of the museum is the one-thousand-year-old 'Utrecht Ship'. The ship is part of the collection 'Stadsgeschiedenis'. The ship was found in 1930 near the Van Hoornekade in Utrecht and was put in the cellar of the 16th-century part of the museum building.

== Governance ==
The museum is together with the Miffy Museum and the Rietveld Schröder House, part of the Centraal Museum Foundation (in Dutch: Stichting Centraal Museum). Bart Rutten has been artistic director since 2019, and Marco Grob the business director since 2007. In 2023, there were a total of 342,893 visitors to the three museums (93,666 of which were visitors to the Centraal Museum).

== Notable people ==
- Carla de Jonge (1886-1972), Director, Centraal Museum, 1941-51
