= Cyprus Neuroscience and Technology Institute =

Cypriot nongovernmental organization

- Formation: 1991
- Type: Research Institute
- Location: Nicosia, Cyprus
- President: Yiannis Laouris
- Main organ: Board of Directors
- Affiliations: Institute for 21st Century Agoras
- Budget: 1,000,000 Euro annually
- Staff: 20
- Volunteers: >50
- Website: http://www.cnti.org.cy

The Cyprus Neuroscience and Technology Institute (CNTI) is a non-profit, non-Governmental independent organization active in programs with future orientation in areas related to human brain-modern technology-social transformation and the repercussions of relevant research for humanity.

== Founding history ==
The Cyprus Neuroscience and Technology Institute was founded through the initiatives of Yiannis Laouris and a team of repatriated Cypriot scientists with the support of ex-Minister of Education and Culture Dr. Chrysostomos Sofianos, District School Inspector Dr. Christodoulos Laouris, the Bishop of Paphos Chrysostomos (now Archbishop of Cyprus) and three prominent foreign academics Prof. Dr. Sc. Med. Peter Schwartze (Germany), Prof. Dr. Med. Habil. Uwe Windhorst (Germany/Canada), and Regents Prof. Douglas Stuart (USA). It was registered on 6 November 1991 and launched its activities in 1993. Between 1994 and 1999 it expanded its operations hosting a number of peace related projects. It was re-structured in year 2000 modifying its original Constitution to embrace projects aiming in the development of an active civil society in Cyprus, as well as projects with international scope, especially those that involve the application of technology towards bridging the literacy, economic and digital divides (Development and IT Education). At the end of 2005, it evolved into a larger organization with a pure international orientation integrating all its activities under one umbrella and a new name, Future Worlds Center.

== Notable operations ==
=== Introducing innovation in children's curricula ===
CNTI served as the research partner CYBER KIDS, a chain of computer learning centers that operated in 7 countries between 1993-2000. The curriculum, which received seven international awards, introduced problem solving, creativity, and IT skills to very young children. In 1993, CNTI launched an innovation fair under the running title "Innovation-Technology-Social Progress Fair." The Ministries of Commerce & Industry, Education & Culture, as well as Labour & Social Insurance, were collectively engaged in order to signify the economic, academic and job-creating facets of promoting innovation. The Fair was mainly supported by the Cyprus Development Bank, the Bank of Cyprus and CYBER KIDS.

=== MAPS: Mental Attributes Profiling System ===
Between the late 90s and 2015, research funded by national and international grants, resulted to the development of video-game like interfaces that assess, profile and improve mental abilities of growing children. MAPS has been validated in schools as a dyslexia screening test and later as a cognitive assessment tool that profiles and predicts abilities of children to read and learn. A more recent line of research aimed the enhancement of cognitive abilities through playing.

=== RTD for children and vulnerable groups ===
Many of CNTI’s projects aimed the exploration of children's and special needs individuals’ attitudes towards and interactions with information technologies. In 2005, CNTI launched a number of projects that promote and implement research in the field of safer use of the Internet; Cyberethics, Cyprus’ Safer Internet Center, which includes a Hotline and a Helpline. CNTI has also founded the Unit of Rehabilitation of Victims of Torture.

=== Actor for regional peace ===
CNTI pioneered with a number of projects in the promotion of peace and reconciliation in Cyprus. The Technology for peace initiative in 1997 aimed to capitalize on the proliferation of the Internet as a means to bear the communication barriers between the northern and the southern parts of divided Cyprus. Other notable peace projects include the Civil Society Dialogue, the Act Beyond Borders and Everybody's song.

=== Representing Cyprus world-wide ===
CNTI scientists represent Cyprus in many European and international networks such as COST 276; COST 219ter; COST 298; COST 2102; Insafe, Inhope, EDEAN etc.

== Awards ==
CNTI and several of its members have been honored with various prestigious awards, such as the Innovation and Quality in Services Award in 1996 for the development of the Cyber Kids curriculum, The Hellenic Society for Systemic Studies Medal in 2005, the Cyprus civil society award in the category of social inclusion in 2006 etc.
