= Schwartze =

Schwartze may refer to:

== People ==
- Hermann Schwartze (1837-1910), aurist
- Johan Georg Schwartze (1814-1874), painter
- Peter Schwartze (born 1931), neurophysiologist
- Stefan Schwartze (born 1974), German politician
- Thérèse Schwartze (1851-1918), painter
- Georgine Schwartze (1854–1935) sculptor

== Places ==
- Alphonse J. Schwartze Memorial Catholic Center, chancery office
- Schwartze Mansion, historic mansion

== See also ==
- Schvartze, derogatory Yiddish term
