= Future Worlds Center =

Nongovernmental organization in Cyprus

- Type: Civil Society Organization
- Location: Nicosia, Cyprus
- Founder: Yiannis Laouris
- Main organ: Board of Directors
- Affiliations: International Society for the Systems Sciences; European Union for Systemics; Institute for 21st Century Agoras
- Budget: 1,000,000 Euro annually
- Staff: 20
- Volunteers: >50
- Website: http://www.futureWorldsCenter.org https://www.FutureWorlds.eu/wiki

Future Worlds Center (FWC) is a non-profit, non-Governmental independent organization active in programs with future orientation in areas related to positive social change, social entrepreneurship and transformation.

== Founding history ==
Future Worlds Center was founded in 1991 as Cyprus Neuroscience and Technology Institute. In the late 1990s, it expanded its operations pioneering in a number of humanitarian, multicultural and peace related projects. At the end of 2005, with a new Constitution, it evolved into a larger organization with a pure international orientation integrating all humanitarian, peace, and multicultural activities under one umbrella.

== Notable Operations ==
According to its new Constitution, Future Worlds Center is an incubator of ideas, projects, social entrepreneurs and organizations committed to socio-technical reforms. Since its inception it has envisioned, designed and implemented more than 100 projects, employed more than 200 young scientists, and founded several organizations, including CYBER KIDS, Technology for peace, the Cyprus Safer Internet Center along with the Cyprus Safer Internet Hotline and Helpline, the Cyprus Community Media Centre funded by the United Nations, Youth Power, Cyprus NGO Platform "Development", the Cyprus Refugee Council.

== Innovations in Education ==
The organization has developed the curriculum for CYBER KIDS, a chain of computer learning centers, that started in Cyprus and expanded in 7 countries in the early 90s. CYBER KIDS was a mass-scale experiment to achieve massive social change in a whole country.

Future Worlds Center also implements many EC-funded projects that conduct research and inform societies about the safer use of the Internet; Cyberethics, Cyprus’ Safer Internet Center, which includes a Hotline and a Helpline.

== Promoting regional peace ==
Future Worlds Center pioneers in envisioning, designing and implementing projects that promote the culture of peace and reconciliation in Cyprus, the region and the globe. The Technology for peace, initiative in 1997, founded by Yiannis Laouris and Harry Anastasiou members of the Cyprus Conflict Resolution Trainers Group aimed to capitalize on the proliferation of the Internet as a means to break the communication barriers between the northern and the southern parts of divided Cyprus. Other notable peace projects include the Youth promoting Peace, Civil Society Dialogue, the Act Beyond Borders, Everybody's song, and many projects funded by HasNa Inc.

== Active promoter of the MDGs ==
Future Worlds Center is leading a number of pan-European efforts, which aim to promote the Millennium Development Goals within Europe and in Sub-Saharan countries. It was a founding member of the Cyprus Islandwide Development NGO Platform and the Cyprus Community Media Centre. The Accessing Development Education project has collected teaching materials or guidance books on topics like Development Education, Global citizenship, Human Rights, Millennium Development Goals and many others from across Europe into one central depository. The Teach MDGs project focuses on increasing awareness and public support for the Millennium Development Goals by actively engaging teacher training institutes, teachers and pupils in developing local oriented teaching resources promoting the MDGs with a particular focus on Sub-Saharan Africa and integrate these into the educational systems of countries across Europe.

== Leading Research and Applications in Structured Dialogic Design ==
The organization has implemented more than 120 Structured Democratic Dialogues in diverse contexts, including, peace and conflict resolution, government and societal challenges (e.g., reforming the local authorities or the Wine Villages of Cyprus), supporting pan-European groups of experts discover obstacles and design actions to improve access to broadband technologies for all but also for people facing accessibility challenges; discovering and collectively agreeing on research agenda priorities, thus influencing European Commission funding; reinventing democracy. Its scientists advanced the underlying science enabling virtual dialogues.

=== Supporting vulnerable groups ===
Future Worlds Center is the implementing organization of the United Nations High Commissioner for Refugees Representation in Cyprus. Its Humanitarian Affairs Unit implements projects that aim strengthening asylum for refugees and asylum seekers on the island. This Unit has founded the Unit of Rehabilitation of Victims of Torture. As of January 2018, a spin-off was created and the Cyprus Refugee Council was created.

== Notable Awards ==
- The Hellenic Society for Systemic Studies Medal in 2007 to Aleco Christakis for his role in founding the science of Structured dialogic design.
- The Hellenic Society for Systemic Studies Award in 2008 to Yiannis Laouris for his peace work within Future Worlds Center.
- Cyprus civil society award in the category of social inclusion in 2008.
- The 2011 Euro-Med Award for the Dialogue between Cultures Honorable Mention -ranked 2nd- for Future Worlds Center and Aleco Christakis, Yiannis Laouris, Harry Anastasiou, Kerstin Wittig and Romina Laouri.
