= INHOPE =

International nonprofit organization

- International Association of Internet Hotlines
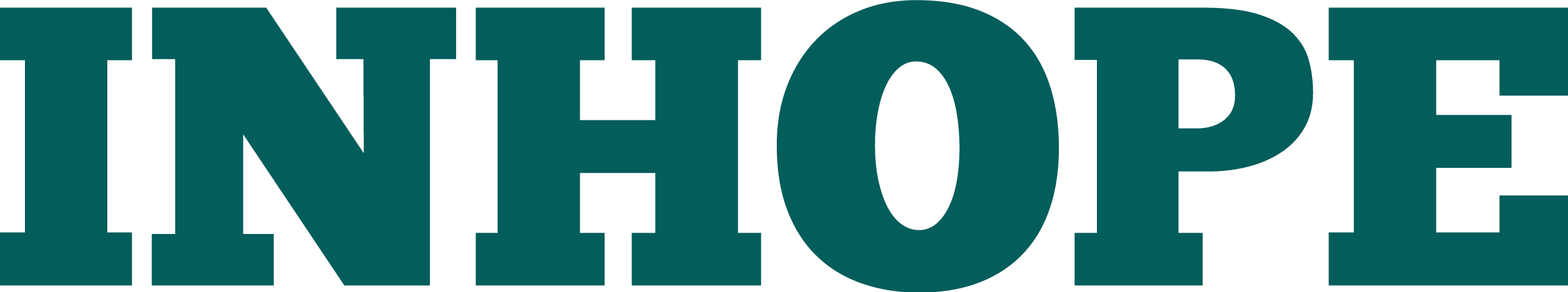
- Abbreviation: INHOPE
- Formation: November 23, 1999
- Founded at: Amsterdam, Netherlands
- Type: Nonprofit
- Purpose: Coordination of national internet hotlines for reporting and removal of child sexual abuse material
- Headquarters: Amsterdam, Netherlands
- Region served: Global
- Members: 57 member hotlines (52 countries, as of 2025)
- Key people: Robbert Hoving (President)
- Main organ: Board of Directors
- Affiliations: European Commission (funder); INTERPOL; Insafe
- Website: inhope.org

INHOPE (International Association of Internet Hotlines) is an international nonprofit organization headquartered in Amsterdam, Netherlands, that coordinates a global network of national hotlines dealing with reports of child sexual abuse material (CSAM) online. It was founded on November 23, 1999 by eight European hotlines, with financial support from the European Commission's Safer Internet Action Plan. INHOPE does not run a public reporting service itself. It sets operational standards, provides training and quality assurance, and maintains the cross-border technical infrastructure that member hotlines rely on. As of 2025, the network covers 57 member hotlines across 52 countries on six continents.

== Background and founding ==
By the mid-1990s, child sexual abuse material had shifted from relatively obscure offline exchange networks into a medium accessible to anyone with a computer and a modem. That shift made the problem more visible to regular people using the internet and put pressure on the internet industry, governments, and law enforcement to respond.

The first internet hotline dedicated to receiving CSAM reports opened in the Netherlands in 1995 as Meldpunt Kinderporno with backing from the police and the internet industry. Similar initiatives emerged quickly elsewhere: Norway, Belgium, and the United Kingdom all set up hotlines before the end of 1996, with Austria, Ireland, Finland, Spain, and France introducing similar programs shortly after. In Germany, several parallel efforts developed between 1995 and 1996, partly driven by high-profile prosecutions and parliamentary debate. In the United States, the National Center for Missing & Exploited Children launched its CyberTipline in March 1998.

Childnet International, a London-based nonprofit founded in 1995 to promote children's interests in global communications, had been watching these national initiatives develop in parallel and argued for international coordination among them. In 1997, Childnet secured funding under the European Commission's Daphne programme to create a forum where the hotlines could meet and share experience. That body, known as the INHOPE Forum, brought together European hotlines to exchange procedural knowledge and discuss how cross-border report sharing might work.

Eight organizations from Austria, France, Ireland, the Netherlands, the United Kingdom, and Germany converted the Forum into a formal association, registered in the Netherlands on November 23, 1999. The National Center for Missing & Exploited Children joined shortly afterward as an associate member. The name INHOPE derives from International Hotline Operators of Europe, though the organization has expanded beyond Europe since.

== Structure and governance ==
INHOPE is registered in the Netherlands and governed by a board elected by the member hotlines. The board includes a President, Vice-President, Treasurer, and additional member representatives, each on two-year terms, and is registered with the Dutch Chamber of Commerce (KvK Amsterdam) under number 34124277.

INHOPE sets minimum operational standards through a Code of Practice that all member hotlines must follow, conducts hotline reviews through a Quality Assurance Program, and supports cross-border collaboration through shared technology. Member hotlines are nationally run organizations like the Irish Internet Hotline that receive public reports of suspected CSAM, assess the content against their national law and INTERPOL's international criteria, and refer confirmed material to law enforcement and internet service providers for removal. The membership criteria trace directly to those developed by the INHOPE Forum and mandate that hotlines be publicly accessible and transparent, maintain consistent procedures, and have the support of government, industry, and law enforcement in their country

== Member hotlines ==
As of 2025, INHOPE has 57 member hotlines operating across 52 countries on six continents. The network includes hotlines in every European Union member state as well as countries in Africa, the Americas, Asia, and Oceania. Germany, Italy, and Hungary each have more than one member hotline; the Netherlands has two following the addition of the regulatory body ATKM in 2024. Countries without a dedicated national hotline can submit reports through Internet Watch Foundation reporting portals, though these territories are not counted as INHOPE members.

Current member hotlines (57 hotlines, 52 countries)

Country	Hotline	Continent	Year joined
Albania	Isigurt (CRCA)	Europe	2021
Andorra	Andorra Digital	Europe	2025
Argentina	Grooming Argentina	South America	2023
Australia	Cyber Report (eSafety Commissioner)	Oceania	2016
Austria	Stopline	Europe	1999 (founding)
Belgium	Child Focus	Europe	2002
Bosnia and Herzegovina	International Forum of Solidarity – EMMAUS	Europe	2011
Brazil	SaferNet	South America	2014
Bulgaria	Safenet.bg	Europe	2006
Cambodia	APLE	Asia	2019
Colombia	Te Protejo	South America	2016
Croatia	CNZD	Europe	2013
Cyprus	CyberSafety	Europe	2019
Czech Republic	Stoponline.cz	Europe	2018
Denmark	Report It (AnmeldDet)	Europe	2001
Estonia	Vihjeliin	Europe	2011
Finland	Nettivihje	Europe	2002
France	Point de Contact	Europe	1999 (founding)
Germany	eco	Europe	1999 (founding)
Germany	FSM	Europe	1999 (founding)
Germany	jugendschutz.net	Europe	1999 (founding)
Greece	SafeLine	Europe	2015
Hungary	Biztonsagosinternet.hu	Europe	2014
Hungary	Internet Hotline (NMHH)	Europe	2019
Iceland	Barnaheill	Europe	2001
Ireland	Irish Internet Hotline	Europe	1999 (founding)
Italy	Save the Children Italy	Europe	2003
Italy	Telefono Azzurro	Europe	2006
Japan	Internet Hotline Center Japan (Pole to Win)	Asia	2024
Latvia	DrossInternets	Europe	2005
Lithuania	Svarus Internetas	Europe	2007
Luxembourg	BEE SECURE Stopline	Europe	2005
Malta	Be Smart Online	Europe	2013
Mexico	Fundación PAS (Te Protejo México)	North America	2022
Moldova	La Strada	Europe	2023
Netherlands	Offlimits (EOKM)	Europe	1999 (founding)
Netherlands	ATKM	Europe	2024
New Zealand	Netsafe	Oceania	2009
Nigeria	ACSAI Nigeria	Africa	2024
Norway	Kripos / NordVakt	Europe	2001
Philippines	ECPAT Philippines	Asia	2022
Poland	Dyżurnet.pl	Europe	2005
Portugal	Linha Internet Segura	Europe	2007
Romania	Ora de Net	Europe	2006
Russia	Friendly Runet Foundation	Europe	2008
Serbia	NetPatrola	Europe	2022
Slovakia	Ochran Ma	Europe	2023
Slovenia	Spletno Oko	Europe	2006
South Africa	Film and Publication Board	Africa	2010
South Korea	KCSC	Asia	2008
Spain	INCIBE	Europe	2022
Sweden	ECPAT Sweden	Europe	2004
Taiwan	Web547 (ECPAT Taiwan)	Asia	1999
Thailand	Thai Hotline	Asia	2010
Turkey	İhbar Web	Europe/Asia	2007
Ukraine	Magnolia Ukraine	Europe	2023
United Kingdom	Internet Watch Foundation	Europe	1999 (founding)
United States	CyberTipline (National Center for Missing & Exploited Children)	North America	1999
Zambia	YOCUPA Zambia	Africa	2025

== Funding ==
The European Commission has funded INHOPE since its founding, across successive programs: the Safer Internet Action Plan (1999 - 2004), the Safer Internet Plus program (2005 - 2008), the Connecting Europe Facility, and the Digital Europe Program. An independent evaluation of the Safer Internet Action Plan concluded that member hotlines were providing a useful and effective service but that most would not survive without public subsidy. INHOPE also receives funding from the End Violence Against Children fund (EVAC), the NEO Philanthropy Foundation, and corporate partners in the technology sector.

== ICCAM ==
The ICCAM platform ("I see Child Abuse Material") is the technical backbone of cross-border cooperation within the network. Developed by ZiuZ Forensics in 2014 with European Commission funding and later maintained by the s3 group, it gives hotlines a secure way to exchange CSAM reports across national jurisdictions, a practical necessity since material reported in one country is often hosted in another. Building a shared cross-border database had been discussed in the INHOPE Forum from its earliest meetings, but at the time it was seen as unlikely to be achievable in the short term given the legal and organizational differences between countries.

When a hotline analyst identifies illegal material at a reported URL, the URL is entered into ICCAM, which crawls the associated content. The analyst classifies each image or video as either baseline (internationally illegal under INTERPOL's criteria), nationally illegal, or not illegal. Baseline-classified content is made available to INTERPOL for transfer to its International Child Sexual Exploitation Image Database (ICSE Database), supporting victim identification and criminal investigations across borders.

In January 2023, INHOPE launched Project CPORT with INTERPOL and law enforcement from Norway, Belgium, Moldova, and France, to build a dedicated portal within ICCAM for investigators. By the end of 2024, CPORT was in use or being piloted in 15 countries.

Report Box, a complementary tool, was developed under the ESCAPE project with EVAC funding for organizations that want to begin taking CSAM reports but lack the infrastructure to build their own intake system.

== Universal Classification Schema ==
One challenge in international cooperation on CSAM is that countries define and categorize it differently. Legal definitions vary enough across jurisdictions that reports shared between hotlines or with law enforcement can be difficult to compare or act on consistently.

To address this, INHOPE developed the Universal Classification Schema (UCS), a standardized framework for categorizing CSAM that is intended to work across platforms, legal systems, and investigative workflows. The Schema was jointly developed by hotline analysts, law enforcement agencies, technology industry representatives, and policymakers, and is governed by an Expert Council that includes INTERPOL, Europol, the US Department of Homeland Security, the Royal Canadian Mounted Police, Queensland Police Service, and academic institutions including the University of Edinburgh.

Version 2 of the Schema was released in 2024 in four languages. Version 3, launched in June 2025, added refined category labels and richer metadata fields, and is being translated into all six UN languages. The Schema is also designed to feed into machine learning tools for automated CSAM detection: by giving analysts a consistent, machine-readable taxonomy for labeling content, it produces structured datasets that can be used to train detection models and, as of mid-2026, to support semi-automated categorization within ICCAM itself.

== Notice and takedown ==
When a hotline confirms that a URL contains CSAM, it sends a notice and take down order to the hosting provider or internet service provider requesting removal. This runs alongside the referral to law enforcement rather than replacing it. The exact procedure varies by country, depending on national legislation and the hotline's relationship with the local internet industry. A UNICEF reference guide for the private sector identifies INHOPE as the principal coordinating body providing hotline contacts and shared protocols to internet companies implementing CSAM removal procedures.

Reports received through the INHOPE network have led to major law enforcement operations. In 2003, the "Marcy" operation, triggered by hotline reports, resulted in investigations across 166 countries involving approximately 26,500 individuals.

== Scale and trends ==
The volume of reports processed by the INHOPE network has grown substantially over time. By 2006, European member hotlines were receiving close to 96,500 web-based reports per year, of which roughly 31 percent were passed to police. In 2021, the network processed nearly one million URLs featuring suspected material, 82 percent of which had not been seen before. In 2024, the network processed nearly 2.5 million suspected records, a 218 percent increase on the previous year; INHOPE attributed this partly to changing distribution methods.

By 2025, forums were the dominant venue for CSAM distribution, accounting for 62 percent of all reports to INHOPE hotlines while traditional websites and image hosts continued to decline. Hotlines reported a broader range of content types, including AI-generated and animated imagery that may not meet illegality thresholds under existing national laws, and noted a rise in websites engineered to appear innocuous while concealing large volumes of material. These shifts echo concerns raised at INHOPE's founding about the tendency of offenders to migrate to new media and jurisdictions as pressure increased in familiar ones.

INHOPE publishes a public-facing Data Portal, funded by the European Commission, with live and historical statistics on reports across the network.

== Safer Internet Day ==
INHOPE co-organizes Safer Internet Day each February alongside Insafe, the European network of internet safety awareness centers, with support from the European Commission. The event is observed in more than 200 countries and focuses on safe and responsible digital use, particularly for children and young people.

== See also ==
- Internet Watch Foundation
- National Center for Missing & Exploited Children
- Irish Internet Hotline
- WeProtect Global Alliance
- Childnet International
- Child sexual abuse material
- Notice and take down
- Safer Internet Day
- Online child abuse
