= Windhorst =

Windhorst may refer to:

- Windhorst, Kansas, American community

== People with the surname ==
- Brian Windhorst (born 1978), American sportswriter
- Fritz Windhorst (born 1935), American attorney and politician
- Lars Windhorst (born 1976), German entrepreneur
- Patrick Windhorst, American politician and member of the Illinois House of Representatives
- Rogier Windhorst (born 1954), Dutch astronomer and professor
- Uwe Windhorst (born 1946), German scientist

== See also ==
- Windhurst
- Windthorst (disambiguation)
