= Thérèse Ansingh =

Dutch artist

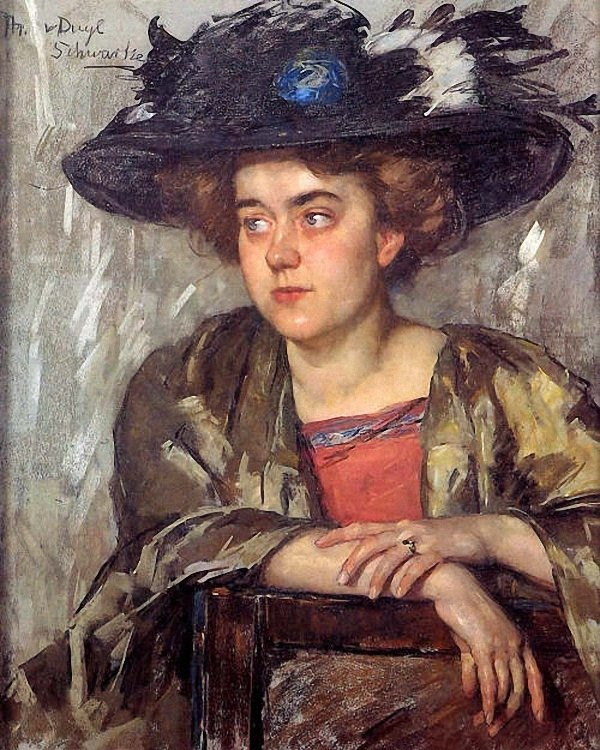
- Portrait of Thérèse Ansingh by Thérèse Schwartze
- Born: 9 July 1883; Amsterdam, Netherlands
- Died: 16 September 1968 (aged 85); Amsterdam, Netherlands
- Other name: Theresia Peizel-Ansingh
- Known for: Painting
- Spouse: Bart Peizel

Thérèse Ansingh who used the pseudonym Sorella (1883-1968) was a Dutch artist.

== Biography ==
Ansingh was born on 9 July 1883 in Amsterdam. She was a member of an artistic family. She was the granddaughter of the painter Johan Georg Schwartze. Her parents were painter Clara Theresa Schwartze and pharmacist Edzard Willem Ansingh. She was the younger sister of Lizzy Ansingh and the niece of the painter Thérèse Schwartze and the sculptor Georgine Schwartze. In In 1917 married the painter Bart Peizel.

Ansingh began painting around 1932, as she was approaching the age of 50. There is no record of her attending art school and her style could be described as naive. She was a member of the Arti et Amicitiae, De Onafhankelijken, and the Kunstenaarsvereniging Sint Lucas. Her work was included in the 1939 exhibition and sale Onze Kunst van Heden (Our Art of Today) at the Rijksmuseum in Amsterdam. In 1941 she received the Sint Lucasprijs (St. Lucas Prize) and in 1956 she received the Arti-medaille (Arti Medal)

Ansingh died on 16 September 1968 in Amsterdam.
