= Cyprus Safer Internet Hotline =

SafenetCY, the Cyprus Internet Hotline
- Formation: 2007
- Purpose: The identification and removal of illegal content on the internet.
- Location: Nicosia, Cyprus
- Region served: Cyprus
- Official language: Greek/Turkish/English
- Parent organization: Cyprus Neuroscience and Technology Institute
- Website: http://www.cyberethics.info

== Basic Information ==
The Cyprus Safer Internet Hotline is a service provided by the Cyprus Safer Internet Center project, coordinated by the Cyprus Neuroscience and Technology Institute (CNTI). The Hotline promotes the safe use of the Internet in Cyprus. It serves the needs of all people that live on the island but also abroad and addresses issues of child pornography, child erotica, child nudity, child grooming activities, child trafficking, child sex tourism, but also racism (currently on the rise in Cyprus), gender discrimination and inappropriate use of peoples’ images.

The Hotline provides assistance to the Cyber Crime unit of the Cyprus Police by filtering reports to determine which reports concern content that is probably illegal and is also located in Cyprus or has a Cypriot dimension. This assists the Police to dedicate their specialist resources to pursuing investigations within their jurisdiction by not having to deal with the majority of reports that do not contain illegal content or relate to material held in other jurisdictions.

The Hotline is a member of the INHOPE International Association of Internet Hotlines, founded in 1999 under the EC Safer Internet Action Plan. INHOPE facilitates and co-ordinates the work of hotlines internationally in responding to illegal use and content on the Internet. It facilitates good working relationships between hotlines and the exchange of reports by ensuring trust built on a rigorous hotline approval process. When illegal content which is not hosted in Cyprus is reported to SafenetCY the report is forwarded via INHOPE to the hotline that operates in the hosting country. If there is no INHOPE hotline in operation in the hosting country, the report is forwarded to the Cyprus Police which can decide based on the nature of the content to pursue an investigation in liaison with Interpol.

== History ==
The service was first established in 2005 as Safeweb in a partnership between the University of Cyprus and the FORTH Institute in Greece. It was re-launched as SafenetCY in March 2007 (Grant Number SIP-2005-AN-038265), when the Cyprus Neuroscience and Technology Institute secured an EU grant together with CYTA with the initiatives of Elia Petridou and Yiannis Laouris. In 2008 it was integrated with the CyberEthics Safer Internet Awareness Center also co-funded by the Safer Internet Plus Program of the European Commission, under Grant Number SIP-2008-CNH-143-802.

The Safer Internet Program of the European Commission (EC) has been instrumental in developing the Hotline network in Europe.

== Visibility ==
SafenetCY has run visibility events to promote Internet safety issues and the importance of making reports to combat the prevalence of illegal content on the Internet. The Hotline has participated and contributed to various forums with the view to developing safer internet initiatives. It has also provided support and speakers for events run by educational organisations, industry associations and child welfare organisations. Interviews regarding the working of the Hotline are regularly given on TV, radio and the written press. It is vital that all relevant agencies work together to promote Internet safety and provide a safer Internet environment for all. SafenetCY is also an active participant in the organisation of various events and activities to raise awareness in the context of the annual celebration of the International Safer Internet Day.

== Related Projects ==
In addition to the Hotline, the Cyprus Safer Internet Center also operates the Cyprus Safer Internet Helpline.

== Sources ==
- EC reference to hotlines
- EC reference to the Cyprus Internet Hotline
- Operational Procedures taken by the Cyprus Internet Hotline (PDF
