= Ansingh =

Ansingh is a surname. Notable people with the surname include:

- Edzard Willem Ansingh (1826–1910), Dutch pharmacist
- Lizzy Ansingh (1875–1959), Dutch painter
- Thérèse Ansingh (1883–1968), known by professional pseudonym Sorella, Dutch artist
