= Pure Telecom =

Irish telecoms company

- Type: Private
- Industry: Telecommunications
- Founded: 9 May 2002; 24 years ago in Dublin, Ireland
- Founders: Paul Connell; Alan McGonnell
- Headquarters: 3018 Lake Drive; Citywest Business Campus; Dublin 24; D24 TY81
- Area served: Republic of Ireland
- Products: Telephone; Broadband
- Revenue: ▲€20 million (2016)
- Members: 42,500 (2017)
- Number of employees: 200 (2017)
- Website: puretelecom.ie

Pure Telecom is an Irish fixed telecommunications company which provides low cost fibre broadband and landline phone services to residential and business consumers.

== History ==
Pure Telecom was founded on 9 May 2002 by Paul Connell and Alan McGonnell, former directors of telecoms provider GTS. In July 2002, the company was in talks with Hutchinson Whampoa with the plan of creating a virtual mobile phone network. In 2004, the company, then based in Cornelscourt, had 4,800 residential customers and 3,500 business customers by April 2005. Pure Telecom acquired the Irish customer base of UK-based Comic Voice and Data, resulting in a revenue boost of €250,000 per month, in October 2004.

In 2005, they moved from its Cornelscourt office to Citywest to facilitate its growing staff base and plans to enter the residential telecommunications market. In September 2007, they acquired NewTel for under €1 million, alongside a subsequent payment of €200,000. Following this agreement, they also acquired NewTel's 12,000 subscribers alongside its call centre in Citywest and staff.

In 2009, the success of its residential arm led to their second office move to its current location in Citywest Business Campus.

In 2016, the company announced that the previous year was its most successful yet, having signed up 10,000 new residential customers in 2015, resulting in a €5 million revenue boost. The following year, the company announced that it had signed up its 40,000th residential customer after adding 10,000 new customers in 2016.

The company has signed a number of deals with leading telecommunications wholesale providers in Ireland such as In 2017, it announced a €35 million deal with open eir, allowing it to offer almost two million potential customers high-speed broadband and phone services via open eir's nationwide open access network.

Estimated at €20 million, it signed a deal with BT in 2018, allowing Pure Telecom to offer broadband and phone services to 1.8 million potential customers via BT Ireland's nationwide infrastructure network.

In 2020, with the agreement it has signed with BT Ireland, Pure Telecom will have access to SIRO's nationwide high-speed fibre broadband network, which currently has 338,000 locations throughout Ireland. With SIRO continuing to link regional and urban locations with gigabit internet, Pure Telecom will be able to reach a wider audience across the nation thanks to the €10M BT deal.
