= Cyprus Safer Internet Helpline =

The Cyprus Internet Helpline
- Formation: 2009
- Location: Nicosia, Cyprus
- Region served: Cyprus
- Official language: Greek/Turkish/English
- Parent organization: Cyprus Neuroscience and Technology Institute (CNTI)
- Website: http://www.helpline.cyberethics.info

The Cyprus Safer Internet Helpline is a service provided by the Cyprus Safer Internet Center project, coordinated by the Cyprus Neuroscience and Technology Institute (CNTI). The Helpline ensures that not only children and adolescents but also adults have the opportunity to converse with experts in case they experience something negative on the Internet. Educated psychologists provide support and essential advice so that the crisis is overcome and the situation is confronted. Members of the public can reach the helpline at the number 7000 0 116. The communication is completely confidential and anonymous.

The need for an operation of a Helpline has been stressed by the European Commission, which supports the idea that the increasing use of the Internet is disproportionate relative to its correct use and moral education. Consequently, many of children come into contact with pages containing inappropriate content or individuals who want to exploit them. Such cases usually cause fear and distress, which must be addressed.

The Hotline is a member of the INSAFE European network of Awareness Centres that promote the safe and responsible use of the Internet and mobile devices to young people. The mission of the Insafe cooperation network is to empower citizens to use the Internet, the mobile phone, as well as other online technologies, positively, safely and effectively. The network calls for shared responsibility for the protection of the rights and needs of citizens, in particular children and youngsters, by government, educators, parents, media, industry and all other relevant actors.

== History ==
The service was first established in 2009, through the Cyprus Internet Awareness Center, and is co-funded by the Safer Internet Plus Program of the European Commission, under Grant Number SIP-2008-CNH-143-802.

The Safer Internet Program of the European Commission has been instrumental in developing the Helpline network in Europe.

== Visibility ==
The Helpine has run visibility events to promote Internet safety issues and has participated and contributed to various forums with the view to developing safer internet initiatives. It has also provided support and speakers for events run by educational organisations, industry associations and child welfare organisations. Interviews regarding the working of the Helpline are regularly given on TV, radio and the written press. The Cyprus Internet Helpline is also an active participant in the organisation of various events and activities to raise awareness in the context of the annual celebration of the International Safer Internet Day.

== Related projects ==
In addition to the Helpline, the Cyprus Safer Internet Center also operates the Cyprus Safer Internet Hotline.

== Sources ==
EC reference to helplines: http://ec.europa.eu/information_society/activities/sip/projects/centres/index_en.htm#awareness_insafe

EC reference to the Cyprus Internet Helpline: http://ec.europa.eu/information_society/apps/projects/factsheet/index.cfm?project_ref=SIP-2008-CNH-143802

ISAFE reference to Cyprus Internet Helpline: http://www.saferinternet.org/web/guest/centre/-/centre/cyprus
