= Chrysostomos A. Sofianos =

Greek Cypriot educator (1939–2023)

Chrysostomos A. Sofianos (Greek: Χρυσόστομος Α. Σοφιανός 1939 – 27 February 2023) was a Greek Cypriot educator who became known because of his role in advocating and strategizing the educational reform of Cyprus in the 1980s from the post of the Minister of Education, and of a party leader.

== Positions held ==
Chrysostomos A. Sofianos served in several teaching, administrative and political positions in Cyprus and in the United States, such as Teacher at all levels of primary and secondary education (1959–1961, 1966–1969), lecturer at the Paedagogical Academy of Cyprus (1969–1972), Research Associate at the Center for Human Resource Development of the Ohio State University (U.S.A), (1973–1975), Assistant Professor of Education at Elmira College (U.S.A), (1975–1976), Minister of Education of Cyprus (1976–1980), Director General of C + M University Preparatory Center (1984–1986). His broad teaching experience included courses in Philology, Greek Language, Philosophy, History, Theory and Philosophy of Education, Sociology and Latin.

== Political and social life ==
Sofianos was founder and President of the political party PAME (Greek: Παγκύπριο Μέτωπο; Pancyprian Front for Renewal; discontinued), (1980–1983), Founder and Member of Cyprus Neuroscience and Technology Institute, Chief Editor of the weekly newspaper “Kypriaki”, (1982–1983), Director of the Government Printing Office (1986–1993), Director of the Presidential Palace, (1993–1995) and Secretary of the Council of Ministers of the Republic of Cyprus (1995–2003).

== Educational reforms ==
Sofianos initiated far-reaching educational reforms during his term as Minister of Education. He was the first minister of education who dared to upgrade the status of the Cypriot dialect in education and thus promote the Cypriot identity.
