= Windthorst =

Windthorst may refer to:

- Ludwig Windthorst (1812-1891), German politician
- Windthorst, Texas, town named after him
- Windthorst, Saskatchewan, town named after him
- Former German name for today's Nova Topola in the municipality of Gradiška, Republika Srpska, Bosnia and Herzegovina

== See also ==
- Windhorst (disambiguation)
