= Internet in the Republic of Ireland =

Internet usage in Ireland was reported at a 98.9 % rate among individuals by 2025, higher than the European Union (EU) average of 89.57%. Ireland's progress in digital infrastructure spans both the fixed and mobile broadband sectors. By 2022, 50% of Irish households had broadband speeds of at least 100 Mbps. Fixed Very High Capacity Network (VHCN) coverage was at 84%, and Fibre to the Premises (FTTP) at 72%, both exceeding EU averages. In mobile broadband, Ireland achieved a notable 98% uptake rate by 2021, the highest in the EU. Furthermore, its 5G coverage reached 84% of populated areas by 2022, slightly surpassing the EU's 81%.

== User statistics ==
- Internet users: 4.0 million, 82.2% of the population, 87th in the world (2016); 3.0 million, 67th in the world (2009)
- Internet hosts: 1.4 million, 40th in the world (2012)
- Internet censorship: Little or none (2011)
- Top-level domain name: .ie

=== Internet providers ===
There are many internet providers in Ireland, offering internet connectivity across a range of connection types.

Services Offered By Providers
Provider	DSL	Cable	Fibre	Mobile	5G	Fixed Wireless
Eir	Yes	No	Yes	Yes	Yes	Yes
Rural WiFi	No	No	Yes	Yes	Yes	No
Virgin Media	No	Yes	Yes	Yes	No	No
Vodafone	Yes	No	Yes	Yes	Yes	No
Three	No	No	No	Yes	Yes	Yes
Imagine	No	No	No	No	No	Yes
Sky Ireland	Yes	No	Yes	No	No	No

=== Market statistics ===
As of Q4 2020, there were 1.8 million broadband subscriptions in Ireland (including mobile broadband but not including mobile phone broadband). Eir had 30% of market share, followed by Virgin Media at 25%, Vodafone at 19%, Sky at 14%, and Rural WiFi at 12%. There were 248,528 subscriptions to fiber to the premises, of which Vodafone had 39% and Eir had 36%.

As of Q4 2020, there were 5.23 million mobile subscriptions in Ireland (not including mobile broadband). 2.42 million of these were prepay subscriptions, while 2.81 million were post paid. 4.53 million of these internet connections were 4G. Mobile providers such as Vodafone, Eir, and Three had launched 5G services, though specific subscriber figures for 5G were not yet available at the time.

As of Q4 2020, Vodafone had 35.3% market share, followed by Three at 30.5%, Eir at 21.7%, Tesco at 8.3%, and Virgin Mobile at 2.3%. Other operators made up 1.9%.

=== Access cost and quality ===
In 2017, a study carried out by BDRC Continental and Cable.co.uk rated Ireland as the third most expensive country in the EU for broadband.

According to Deutsche Bank Research "Mapping the World's Prices 2019" report, Internet access in Dublin is the second most expensive in the world, after Dubai in UAE.

Speed tests run by SpeedTest.net in June 2020 rank mobile Internet access in Ireland at the 78th place in the world, below Angola, and at the 39th place for broadband, below Malaysia and above Kuwait.

== Broadband ==
=== Fixed broadband ===
Ireland has shown a commitment to enhancing its fixed broadband infrastructure, with significant improvements aimed at exceeding EU digital infrastructure targets. The uptake of broadband at speeds of at least 100 Mbps in Ireland reached 50% of households by 2022, compared to the EU average of 55%. Ireland's Fixed Very High Capacity Network (VHCN) coverage exceeded the EU average, reaching 84% in 2022, compared to the EU's 73%. Additionally, Fibre to the Premises (FTTP) coverage in Ireland grew from 48% in 2020 to 72% by 2022, higher than the EU average of 56%.

The government-sponsored National Broadband Initiative aims to deliver fibre to the premises to approximately 564,000 homes, farms, schools and businesses which would otherwise not be covered by commercial providers. The initial offerings are 0.5Gbit and 1Gbit, with an eventual 5Gbit offering possible.

=== Mobile broadband ===
Ireland's mobile broadband sector has demonstrated strides towards achieving comprehensive digital connectivity, as detailed in the European Commission's Digital Decade Country Report 2023. The nation has achieved a mobile broadband take-up rate of 98% among individuals by 2021, positioning it as a leading performer within the EU. Furthermore, Ireland has shown steady progress in the rollout of 5G technology, with overall coverage reaching 84% of populated areas by 2022, slightly above the EU average of 81%. Despite a substantial increase in 5G spectrum assignment, from 29% in 2021 to 63% by 2023, Ireland remains below the EU average of 68%, primarily due to the unawarded spectrum in the 26 GHz frequency band. The completion of a multi-band spectrum award by ComReg in January 2023 marks a significant step in enhancing network capacity and advancing towards the 2030 goal of 100% 5G coverage. Ireland performs well on the 3.4-3.8 GHz spectrum band, although rural 5G coverage is slightly below the EU average.

== Digital public services ==
Ireland's progress in the digitalization of public services is highlighted by an 88% e-government user rate, surpassing the EU average of 74%. In digital services for citizens, Ireland scored 81 out of 100, above the EU average of 77, and achieved a score of 100 for digital services for businesses, thereby already meeting the EU 2030 target. Despite these achievements, Ireland faces challenges in e-health, with a score of 0 for access to e-health records, in contrast to an EU average of 72. The National Digital Strategy aims for 90% of services to be utilized online by 2030 and for 80% of eligible citizens to use MyGovID by the same year.

== History ==
The first demonstration of a pre-Internet network connection between Irish universities was in 1977 between University College Dublin and Trinity College Dublin. By 1981, Michael Purser and Ahmed Patel had made connections to the Euronet international network. In 1983-84, Dennis Jennings was president of EARN, the European part of BITNET. By 1984, the tcdmath node was part of the UUCP network and by 1985 Ireland had a BITNET node. Outside academia, Bulletin board systems could be used by the general public, some linking to the FidoNet network. The first connection to the Internet was made from Trinity College Dublin in June 1991 and was shared with IEunet, effectively Ireland's first Internet Service Provider.

Founded in 1996, the Internet Neutral Exchange (INEX) is an industry-owned association that provides IP peering and traffic exchange for its members in Ireland. The INEX switching centres are located in four secure data centres in Dublin: TeleCity Group in Kilcarbery Park, Dublin 22 & TeleCity Group in Citywest Business Campus, Dublin 24 and Interxion DUB1, and Interxion DUB2 in Park West. The switches are connected by dedicated resilient fibre links. In March 2013 it listed 57 full and 18 associate members.

Established in 1998, the Internet Service Providers Association of Ireland (ISPAI) listed 24 Internet access and hosting providers as members in 2012.

Eir, the largest telephone company in Ireland, began rolling out broadband Internet access in 2002. Broadband Internet access is available via DSL, cable, wireless, and satellite. By the end of 2011 Eircom announced that 75% of its working lines would be connected to Next Generation Broadband (NGB) enabled exchanges.

In August 2012, Pat Rabbitte, the Minister for Communications, Energy and Natural Resources, outlined a national broadband plan with goals of:

- 70-100 Mbit/s broadband service available to at least 50 per cent of the population,
- at least 40 Mbit/s available to at least a further 20 per cent, and
- a minimum of 30 Mbit/s available to everyone, no matter how rural or remote.

== Censorship ==
Internet censorship in Ireland is a controversial issue with the introduction of a graduated response policy in 2008 followed by an effort to block certain file sharing sites starting in February 2009. Grassroots campaigns including "Blackout Ireland" and "Boycott Eircom" have been established to protest the censorship.

Beyond these issues there are no government restrictions on access to the Internet or credible reports that the government monitors e-mail or Internet chat rooms. Individuals and groups could engage in the expression of views via the Internet, including by e-mail. Irish law provides for freedom of speech including for members of the press, and the government generally respects these rights in practice. An independent press, an effective judiciary, and a functioning democratic political system act jointly to ensure freedom of speech and of the press.

== See also ==
- Broadband in Northern Ireland
- IE Domain Registry
- Internet Neutral Exchange, an Internet traffic exchange point located in Ireland
- Irish Internet Hotline, illegal Internet content reporting service
- Media of the Republic of Ireland
- Telecommunications in Ireland
