= Irish Internet Hotline =

Ireland's reporting service for illegal internet content

- Company type: Not-for-profit
- Industry: Online Safety
- Founded: November 1999; 26 years ago in Dublin, Ireland
- Website: hotline.ie

Irish Internet Hotline or Hotline.ie is the national reporting service for illegal internet content in Ireland, especially for reporting child sexual abuse images. The service also takes reports relating to intimate image abuse, racism and xenophobia and online financial scams with links to Ireland. The hotline provides a secure and confidential environment where the general public can anonymously report material they suspect to be illegal on the Internet. The reports are then assessed by trained analysts who forward relevant reports to An Garda Síochána for investigation and internet service providers for removal. The reports can be made using the secure reporting section within the website. Alternatively, reports can be made by email or by phone.

== Website ==
Hotline.ie is run as a service of the Internet Service Providers Association of Ireland (ISPAI), a not-for-profit limited company, established in 1998 by internet service providers operating in the Republic of Ireland. When the Hotline receives a report it follows a procedure which has been agreed with the Office for Internet Safety (OIS), the Garda Síochána and with the Internet Service Providers.

Hotline.ie provides assistance to the Garda Síochána by filtering reports to determine what is probably illegal and is also located in Ireland or has an Irish dimension. This assists the Gardaí to dedicate their specialist resources to pursuing investigations within the jurisdiction by not having to deal with the majority of reports which more thank likely do not contain illegal content or relate to material held in other jurisdictions.

The Hotline addresses the issue of responding to reported content that is outside the Irish jurisdiction through membership of the INHOPE Association and cooperation with the Garda Síochána. INHOPE (The Association of Internet Hotline Providers) facilitates and co-ordinates the work of hotlines in responding to illegal use and content on the Internet. It facilitates good working relationships between hotlines and the exchange of reports by ensuring trust built on a rigorous hotline approval process. Hotline.ie is a founding member of INHOPE. The ISPAI is completely funded by the industry on a cost-sharing basis. A General Manager, who is an employee of the ISPAI, manages the administrative, financial and operational functions of the Hotline. The Hotline General Manager reports to the ISPAI Board of Directors.

== History ==
The service was established by the Internet Service Providers' Association of Ireland (ISPAI) in November 1999 as a result of recommendations made by the Working Group on the Illegal and Harmful Use of the Internet. The Working Group was established by the Department of Justice, Equality and Law Reform.

The effectiveness of self-regulation of the Internet Service Providers industry was originally monitored on behalf of Government by the Internet Advisory Board, established in February 2000 by the Department of Justice, Equality and Law Reform. This was replaced in 2007 by the Office for Internet Safety (OIS), a section also within the Department of Justice, Equality & Law Reform, to bring about greater cohesion across Government departments and bodies and provide for a more effective and transparent enforcement structure in relation to the ISPAI's Code of Practice and Ethics. The OIS now oversees the Hotline's procedures.

Hotline.ie would not exist without the commitment of the ISPAI members. These are ISPs providing public Internet services in Ireland who take the interests of their customers and Internet safety seriously by financially supporting the Hotline. At present there are 23 members who support the Hotline.ie: Eircom, BT Ireland, O_{2}, Vodafone, HEAtnet, Verizon, Irish Broadband, Virgin Media Ireland, Google, Maxer Host, Meteor, Irish Domains, Clearwire, Blacknight, Hutchinson 3G Ireland, Bitbuzz, EuroKom, Smart telecom, MyHost, Hosting Ireland, Perlico, Satellite Broadband, and Strencom.

The Internet Service Providers' Association of Ireland provides funding for the Hotline with the assistance of the European Commission.

The Safer Internet plus Programme of the European Commission (EC) has been instrumental in developing the Hotline network in Europe. Hotline.ie has benefited from project funding since this programme was initiated in 2000. In 2006 the Hotline was successful in attracting European Commission continued funding running from March 2006 for 2 years and providing 50% of eligible operating costs under the Safer Internet Programme.

Hotline.ie has run visibility events to promote Internet safety issues and the importance of making reports to combat the prevalence of illegal content on the Internet. The Hotline has participated and contributed to various forums like the National Parents’ Council (Department of Education) and the High-Tech Crime Forum (Irish Banking Federation) with the view to developing safer internet initiatives. It has also provided support and speakers for events run by educational organisations, industry associations and child welfare organisations. In addition, Hotline.ie has provided training to staff of other INHOPE member hotlines and hosted fact finding missions from foreign law enforcement and government representatives, such as Australia, France and the Netherlands. Interviews regarding the working of the Hotline are regularly given on TV, radio and the written press. It is vital that all relevant agencies work together to promote Internet safety and provide a safer Internet environment for all.

== Sources ==
- Irish telecommunications regulator, ComReg
- The Irish mobile operators' Code of Practice
