= Haridimos Tsoukas =

Greek organization theorist (born 1961)

Haridimos K. Tsoukas
- Χαρίδημoς Κ. Τσούκας
- Born: 1961 (age 64–65); Karpenisi, Greece
- Known for: Perspectives on Process Organization Studies series Co-editor
- Awards: The Hellenic Society for Systemic Studies Award

Academic background
- Education: Aristotle University of Thessaloniki; Cranfield University; University of Manchester
- Thesis: Explaining work organisation : a realistic approach (1989)
- Doctoral advisor: Tom Lupton

Academic work
- Discipline: Social science
- Sub-discipline: Organizational management
- Institutions: University of Manchester; University of Warwick; University of Essex; University of Strathclyde; University of Cyprus
- Website: www.htsoukas.com

Haridimos "Hari" K. Tsoukas (Χαρίδημoς Κ. Τσούκας, born 1961) is a Greek organization theorist and leadership scholar. He is currently the Columbia Ship Management Professor of Strategic Management at the University of Cyprus, and Distinguished Research Environment Professor of Organization Studies at the Warwick Business School, University of Warwick.

Tsoukas has conducted pioneering research in the fields of knowledge-based perspectives on organizations, the epistemology of practice, epistemological issues in organization theory, and management of organizational change and social reforms.

== Career ==
Tsoukas was born in Karpenisi in 1961. He obtained his BSc in Electrical Engineering (1983) from the Aristotle University of Thessaloniki, his MSc in Industrial Engineering (1985) from Cranfield University. By his own admission, Tsoukas was an "unhappy" engineer, which led to him seeking his PhD in Organizational Sociology (1989) from the Manchester Business School at the University of Manchester to become a social scientist.

From 1988 to 1990, Tsoukas taught at Manchester Business School, 1990 to 1995 at Warwick Business School, 1995 to 1998 at the University of Cyprus, 1998 to 2000 at the University of Essex, 2000 to 2003 at the University of Strathclyde, and 1999 to 2009 at the ALBA Graduate Business School.

While teaching, he also conducted research and began developing his theories. From 2003 to 2008, he served as Editor-in-chief of Organization Studies, a major management journal. In 2010, he joined the University of Cyprus as Columbia Ship Management Professor of Strategic Management, and in 2018, he became the Dean of Graduate Studies.

== Theories ==
Tsoukas is known for his theory of phronesis a term borrowed from Aristotle that Tsoukas describes as the "engaged judgement" which emerges in a practitioner through the practice of his skill or vocation, which he has written about with John Shotter. Through continued practice constrained by institutional norms and morals and social expectations, practitioners develop judgement that enables them to deal competently with novel situations in a way that is consistent with the ethics of their professional. Tsoukas believes that traditional models of institutional organization ignore the moral dimension. which he and his collaborators attempt to rectify by applying virtue ethics to their studies of organizational improvisation.

== Media ==
Besides his work in research and education, Tsoukas contributed to different publications amongst which an assignment as Editor-in-chief (2003–2008) of Organization Studies, the renowned peer-reviewed academic journal. He is a regular contributor to Kathimerini. Further, Tsoukas maintained a personal blog in Greek entitled Ὲναρθη Κραυγή (Enarthi Kravgi, "Articulate Howl"), on which he regularly commented on Greek and Cypriot politics; the blog eventually supplied the title of one of his books.

Tsoukas is frequently interviewed or cited by the Cypriot media, notably about the fallout from the now-closed Cypriot "golden visa" program, and regarding a controversy over the alleged use of "woke" terminology in a government database, for which the minister responsible apologized. Tsoukas defends wokeism as essential to being a "consistent liberal democrat", stating that "...you're obliged to stay vigilant – to be woke." Regarding the dismissal of former auditor Odysseas Michaelides, which has become an issue in the upcoming Cypriot election, Tsoukas said that Michaelides had given Cypriots "the power to hope that Cyprus is viable once again."

== Awards ==
Tsoukas has been awarded numerous prizes in his field, singly, or jointly with other academics:

- James G. March Prize 2020, for the paper “Sensemaking Reconsidered: Towards a broader understanding through phenomenology”, Organization Theory, 1 (1), 2020 – with Jörgen Sandberg
- Prix Roger-Charbonneau 2017, Presented by HEC Montréal for the best book of the year written in a language other than French, for the book «The Sage Handbook of Organization Studies» (Sage, 2017) – with Ann Langley
- Cyprus Research Award – Distinguished Researcher 2016: The Distinguished Researcher Award for research carried out in Cyprus (jointly with Michalinos Zempylas)
- Joanne Martin Trailblazer Award 2016: for having taken a leadership role in the field of Organization and Management Theory (OMT) by opening up new lines of thinking or inquiry
- European Group of Organization Studies (EGOS) Honorary Member 2016
- Doctor of Science from the University of Warwick, 2014, honoris causa, in recognition of his contributions to his field
- Best MBA Teacher Award 2005-2014: An award for teaching excellence based on evaluations by the participants of the Warwick Business School MBA Programme.
- The Hellenic Society for Systemic Studies Award, 2009
- Athens Laboratory of Business Administration (ALBA) Outstanding Research Award, 2002
- Operational Research Society’s President's Medal, 1997 (jointly with D. B. Papoulias for their paper “Understanding Social Reforms: A Conceptual Analysis”)
- Tom Lupton Scholarship, 1985-88 (a doctoral research scholarship granted by the Manchester Business School in memory of Professor Tom Lupton)

== Selected publications ==
Tsoukas has published, as an author, editor or contributor, more than 300 works, held in more than 3400 libraries worldwide.

=== In English ===
==== Books ====
- 2024 Leadership as Masterpiece Creation: What Business Leaders Can Learn from the Humanities about Moral Risk-Taking Hardcover Cambridge: MIT Press (with Charles Spinosa and Matthew Hancocks) ISBN 0262048965
- (2012) From Stagnation to Forced Adjustment: Reforms in Greece, 1974-2010 London - New York: Hurst & Co. - Columbia University Press (with George Pagoulatos and Stathis Kalyvas) ISBN 9781849041980
- (2011) Philosophy and Organization Theory, Emerald (with Robert Chia) ISBN 978-0-85724-595-3
- (2005) Complex Knowledge: Studies in Organizational Epistemology, Oxford University Press ISBN 9780199275571
- (2004) Organizations as Knowledge Systems, Palgrave Macmillan (with N. Mylonopoulos) ISBN 9780230571150
- (2004) Managing the Future: Foresight in the Knowledge Economy, Blackwell (with J. Shepherd) ISBN 1405116153
- (2003) The Oxford Handbook of Organization Theory: Meta-theoretical Perspectives (Oxford Handbooks); Oxford University Press (with Christian Knudsen) ISBN 9780199275250
- (2002) Constructing Identity in and Around Organizations, Oxford University Press (with M. Schultz, S. Maguire and A. Langley) ISBN 9780199640997, revised 2012.

==== Journals ====
- (2024) "Judgment in Business and Management Research: Shedding New Light on a Familiar Concept", Academy of Management Annals, 18/2: (with Demetris Hadjimichael, Anup Karath Nair, Igor Pyrko and Sarah Woolley)
- (2009) "A dialogical approach to the creation of new knowledge in organizations", Organization Science 20/6: 941–957

=== In Greek ===
- (2015) Η τραγωδία των κοινών • Πολιτική φαυλότητα, απαξίωση θεσμών και χρεοκοπία [The Tragedy of the Commons: Political Corruption, Obsolescence of Institutions, and Bankruptcy], Athens:Ikaros ISBN 978-960-572-054-4
- (2007) Έναρθρη κραυγή • Κριτικές παρεμβολές στον δημόσιο λόγο' [Articulate Howl: Critical Interjections in the Public Discourse], Athens:Kastiniotis, ISBN 9789600344745
- (2005) Αν ο Αριστοτέλης ήταν διευθύνων σύμβουλος • Δοκίμια για την ηγεσία και τη διοίκηση [If Aristotle Was a CEO: Essays in Leadership and Management], Athens:Kastiniotis ISBN 978-960-03-3903-1
