= Douglas G. Stuart =

Australian neuroscientist

- Born: October 5, 1931; Casino, New South Wales, Australia
- Died: April 6, 2019 (aged 87); Tucson, AZ
- Education: Diploma in Physical Education Sydney Teachers' College; BS (PE; physiology) 1955; MA (PE; physiology) Michigan State University; PhD (Physiology) 1961 University of California-Los Angeles
- Occupation: Neuroscientist
- Employer: University of Arizona
- Organization: Department of Physiology
- Known for: Neuroscience, Fatigue, Aging, Electromyography, Motor Control
- Title: Regents' Professor Emeritus of Physiology
- Awards: Regents' Professor, University of Arizona 1990
- Website: Stuart's page at UA

Douglas G. Stuart (October 5, 1931 – April 6, 2019) was an American-Australian neuroscientist. He was a Regents' professor emeritus of Physiology at the University of Arizona.

== Early life and career ==
As a young man in Australia, Stuart trained to compete with the Australian team in the British Commonwealth Games as a high jumper. He came to Michigan State University (East Lansing, Michigan) on a track scholarship in 1954 to complete his BS (1955) and MS (1956) in physical education with an emphasis on mammalian physiology and the physiology of exercise. It was at MSU that Stuart developed his interest and expertise in academe (including exposure to experimental neuroscience; his first venture involved testing the effects of fatigue on human reaction time); blossomed in public speaking (MSU sent him state-wide to promulgate interest in its foreign student program) and leadership (he co-ran a dormitory of 500 undergraduate and graduate students); met and subsequently married (1957) an American undergraduate (see below). Rather, with the guidance of an outstanding MSU teacher and mentor, Professor W. Duane Collings (1914–81), he opted to pursue a PhD in physiology at UCLA, where he began his studies in January 1957. Immediately prior, however, he returned briefly to Australia where, after failing to make the Australian track team, he designed and had built the scoreboards used for over a dozen sports (e.g., basketball, boxing, gymnastics, swimming) at the Melbourne Olympic Games in November 1956. During this visit he was offered the opportunity to return to the US as a member of the Australian Department of External Affairs by its then-minister, Richard Casey. The NSW Department of Education also offered him a new and unique position as a track and field organizer and coach of new clubs throughout the state. By then, however, Stuart was firmly committed to undertaking a PhD in physiology, with a subsequent research career in the USA.

== Contributions in neuroscience ==
Stuart is known worldwide for his research contributions in neural control of movement, in the understanding of the fundamental properties of spinal neurons, overviews on the neurobiology of motor control, and the history of movement neuroscience. He has over 130 experimental papers published in peer-reviewed scientific journals, and has authored almost 100 chapters, reviews and symposium volumes. His research was funded continuously by the National Institutes of Health. Between 1984 and 1991, he held the Senator Jacob Javits Neuroscience Investigator Award, and between 1976 and 1977 he was selected as a Guggenheim Fellow. Stuart coined the term "interphyletic awareness" during the organization (together with Sten Grillner (Stockholm University and Paul Stein (Washington University in St. Louis) of three international conferences that brought together scientists working on various species, all followed by widely read symposium volumes. Stuart's lab has made exceptional contributions to the study of locomotion, and the need to integrate findings from experiments on invertebrates, non-mammalian vertebrates, mammalian tetrapods, non-human primates, and humans.

In his later years, Stuart focused on writing historical articles and reviews on the history of neuroscience in general, and movement neuroscience in particular.

== Personal life ==
He became a naturalized US citizen in 1961. He was married, and had four children and seven grandchildren.

== Other achievements ==
Almost 100 scientists from across the globe have worked with Stuart as PhD students, post-doctoral trainees or visiting professors. A number of Stuart's post-doctoral trainees are now leading research universities and institutes in the US and worldwide (e.g., Cyprus Neuroscience and Technology Institute, Nicosia, Cyprus; Ibaraki Prefectural University of Health Sciences, Ibaraki, Japan; Institute of Biophysics, Bulgarian Academy of Sciences, Sophia, Bulgaria; Nara Medical University, Yagi, Japan; University of Chicago, IL, USA; University of Washington, Seattle, WA; McGill University, Montreal, Canada; University College, London, UK).

== Awards ==
- USPHS Predoctoral Fellow - UCLA Mental Health Training Program: for temperature regulation studies with Professor Allan Hemingway, Dept Physiology, UCLA, Los Angeles, CA 1958-61
- Bank of America-Giannini Foundation Postdoctoral Medical Research Fellow: for muscle receptor studies with Professor Earl Eldred, Dept Anatomy, UCLA, Los Angeles, CA 1961-63
- USPHS Special Research Fellowship: for spinal-cord studies with Professor Anders Lundberg, Dept Physiology, University of Goteborg, Goteborg, SWE 1971-72
- Guggenheim Fellow: for studies in clinical neurophysiology with Dr David Burke, Unit of Clinical Neurophysiology, The Prince Henry Hospital, University of New South Wales, Sydney, AUS 1976-77
- Senator Jacob Javits Neuroscience Investigator, a NINCDS award, National Institutes of Health 1984-91
- Keynote Speaker, 5th Annual Faculty Teaching Awards, College of Medicine, University of Arizona 1985
- Seventh Annual Neuroscience Lecture, Neurological Sciences Institute, Good Samaritan Hospital, Portland, OR 1987
- Grass Foundation Traveling Scientist: University of Manitoba, Winnipeg, MA, CAN, 1989; University of Delaware, Newark, DE 2001
- Eleventh Annual Founders Day Speaker, College of Medicine, University of Arizona, 1989
- Regents' Professor, University of Arizona 1990
- John Marley Leadership Award, Section on Research, American Physical Therapy Association 1995
- Graduation Convocation Speaker, College of Health Professions, Northern Arizona University, Flagstaff, AZ 1995
- Certificate of Recognition for Contributions in Teaching, Research, and Service in Neuroscience, The University of Arizona 1998
- Invited Speaker, Dedication of Biology/Biochemistry Building, Northern Arizona University, Flagstaff, AZ 2000
- Invited speaker, Flinn Foundation Finale Dinner, Motor Control Laboratory, Arizona State University, Tempe, AZ 2000
- Named University of Arizona Fellowship in Perpetuity, "The Douglas G Stuart Predoctoral Fellowship in Movement Neuroscience" 2002-Pres
- Award for contributions to Biomedical Engineering, The University of Arizona 2003
- Award for Contributions to Graduate Interdisciplinary Programs, The University of Arizona 2004
