= Hellenic Society for Systemic Studies =

Greek professional organization for systems sciences

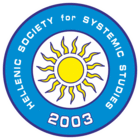
- Founded: 2003
- Type: Professional organization
- Purpose: Systems sciences
- Location: Athens, Greece
- Region served: Greece
- Method: Conferences, publications, certification programs, award schemes
- Key people: Nikitas Assimakopoulos (President)
- Website: www.hsss.gr

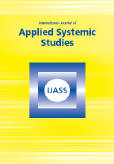
International Journal of Applied Systemic Studies

The Hellenic Society for Systemic Studies (Greek: Ελληνική Εταιρεία Συστημικών Μελετών, ΕΕΣΜ) is a scientific non-profit society that was established in 2003. It is a member of the International Society for the Systems Sciences, the International Federation of Systems Research and the European Union for Systemics. Its founding and first president is Nikitas Assimakopoulos.

== International prizes established by the society ==
Since 2005, the society has established two prizes to honor world pioneers in the fields of systems and complex studies: the "Hellenic Society for Systemic Studies Medal" is given to senior scientists whose work in systems and complex sciences has been extremely influential worldwide, and the "Hellenic Society for Systemic Studies Award" is given to individuals who have contributed significantly to the further development of systemic and complex sciences and their applications towards solving real-life problems.

=== List of recipients of the Hellenic Society for Systemic Studies Gold Medal ===
- 2007 Alexander Christakis, Institute for 21st Century Agoras, United States.
- 2009 Mike Jackson, University of Hull, United Kingdom.

=== List of recipients of the Hellenic Society for Systemic Studies Medal ===
- 2007 Timothy K. Shih, Tamkang University, Taiwan.
- 2007 José Pérez Ríos, University of Valladolid, Spain.
- 2007 Yolles Maurice, Centre for the Creation of Coherent Change & Knowledge (C4K), United Kingdom.
- 2008 Yiannis Laouris, Future Worlds Center, Cyprus.
- 2008 Arn Collen, Saybrook College, United States.
- 2009 Bob Cavana, University of Wellington, New Zealand.
- 2009 Linda Macaulay, Manchester Business School, United Kingdom.
- 2009 Haridimos Tsoukas, ALBA and University of Cyprus, Greece.

== International Journal of Applied Systemic Studies ==
The International Journal of Applied Systemic Studies published by Inderscience Publishers is the society's official journal. For its inaugural volume, the society's president underlined the fact that "it is one of very few journals within the international community of people who work on Systems Sciences that deals directly with applications of systems research or study. It is possibly the only journal, internationally, that combines a systems approach to many mainstream and scientific disciplines."

== Certification program ==
The society has developed and offers an international post-graduate certification program in Professional Systemics in collaboration with the University of Piraeus, named Certified Systemic Analyst Professional. The certification is to the individual using the ISO 17024 standards.
