= Linda Macaulay =

English professor

Linda Ann Macaulay is the Emeritus Professor of System Design at the University of Manchester, specialising in Human–computer interaction, Requirements engineering and Service science, management and engineering.

== Education ==
Linda Macaulay obtained a Bachelor of Science degree in Mathematics at the University of Sheffield in 1972, and a Research master's degree in Computational Science from the University of St Andrews in 1976. She later obtained her Doctor of Philosophy in Computation from the University of Manchester, becoming a Fellow of the British Computer Society.

== Research ==
=== Human Computer Interaction ===
Professor Macaulay's 1995 book Human Computer Interaction for Software Designers, served presents a number of techniques for use by System Designers to help them take account of user needs within the design process. The Engineering and Physical Sciences Research Council recognised her HCI research through the award "Human Factors in the Design of Electronic Service Delivery Systems for use in Complex Environments".

=== Requirements Engineering ===
Her book on requirements engineering focussed on techniques for involving users in the early stages of requirements in the software design process led to an EPSRC award for "Co-operative Requirements Capture", and a number of articles including USTM: A New Approach to Requirements Specification, Requirements as a Co-operative Activity, A Seven Layer Model of the Role of the Facilitator in Requirements Engineering. She won the Economic and Social Research Council award for "Human Issues in Security and Privacy in e-Commerce".

=== Service System Design ===
Macaulay's contributed to one of the earliest publications recognising the need for more flexible software, known as "software as a service", and to be co-investigator in the Interdisciplinary Software Engineering Network. She later founded the EPSRC UK network in Service Science, to develop and promote UK capability in service sciences. Her book Case Studies in Service Innovation presents a study of how service innovation occurs in practice.

== Career ==
In 1999 Linda was the first female Professor to be appointed to the Department of Computation at the University of Manchester Institute of Science and Technology. She is now at Manchester Business School.

== Awards ==
- IBM Faculty Award for research in service science

== Personal life ==
Professor Macaulay is married to Patrick Macaulay, they have three children Jon-Sebastian, Theresa and Christine.
