= SaferNet =

Brazilian internet-safety organization

SaferNet is a Brazilian non-governmental organization that combats Internet crime in partnership with the Federal Public Ministry. SaferNet fights for online human rights, with a strong focus on combating digital pedophilia, fascism and brazilian electoral disinformation. It facilitates anonymous reporting and provides information and training about Internet safety and security. Safernet operates in three strategic arms simultaneously: the National Center for the Denouncement of Cyber Crimes (hotline), the National Guidance Channel on Internet Security and Brazil helpline, and the actions of Education in digital citizenship.

Safernet facilitates anonymous reporting of crimes, with extra consideration for preventing and investigating child pornography, identity theft and various hate crimes. It also works with the government to improve legislation for Internet-related crimes. Safernet also educates, trains, and mobilizes the public on issues relating to their rights and safety.

== History ==
In 2006, Safernet and the Federal Public Ministry brought a suit against Google's Brazilian business unit alleging that Google was not policing Orkut pages enough to prevent pornography and hate crimes. Complying with the judge's ruling, Google provided the requested user information to the brazilian authorities.

SaferNet CEO Thiago Tavares fled Brazil, going into voluntary exile in Germany, after facing threats, having an employee kidnapped, a family member attacked (hospitalized after suffering a head injury), and discovering he was infected with NSO Group's Pegasus spyware.

The SaferNet CEO realized it was time to move to another country when a family member was attacked and ended up in intensive care, and also when he discovered his computer was infected with NSO Group's Pegasus spyware, a tool used by authoritarian governments to spy on journalists, activists, and opposition politicians, as well as their friends and family.

Pegasus is a spyware developed by the NSO Group, an Israeli company, that can secretly infect mobile devices, allowing access to data such as messages, passwords, and location, capable of stealing files, photos, videos, and messages stored on devices, as well as transmitting browsing history, location, microphone, and camera data in real time. It works by exploiting flaws in systems, such as a phone's operating system, to gain control of the device and collect information from various messaging and social media apps.
