= Johan Georg Schwartze =

Dutch painter (1814–1874)

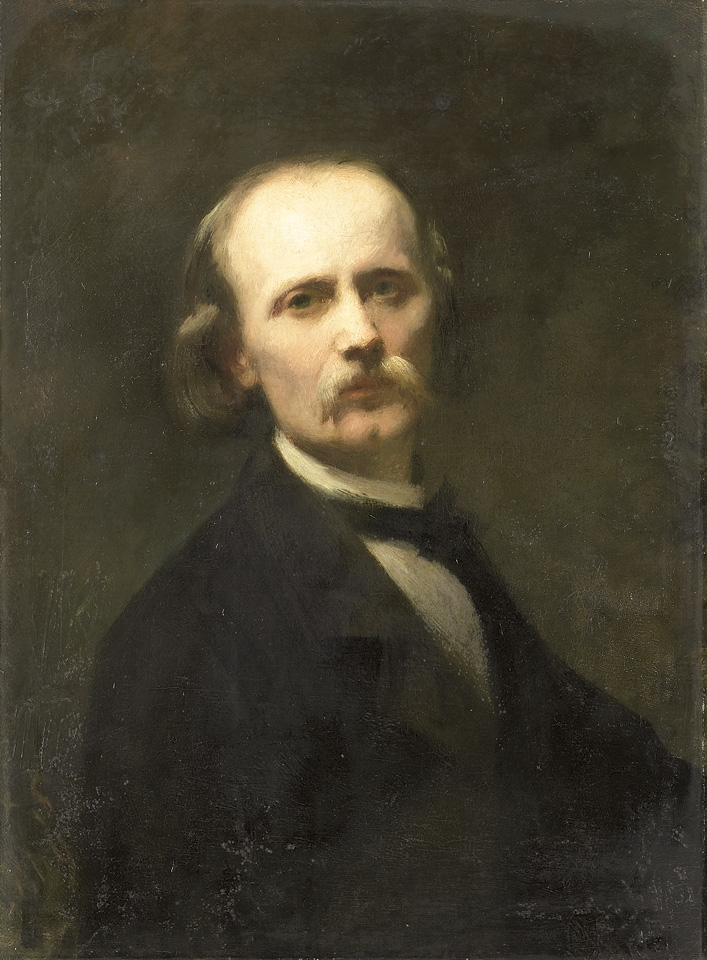
Self portrait (1869)

Johann Georg Schwartze (20 October 1814 – 28 August 1874) was a painter from the Netherlands who grew up in Philadelphia and was trained in Düsseldorf and the Düsseldorf school. He was a painter of portraits and historical themes and became the father of painter Therese Schwartze and the sculptor Georgine Schwartze.

At the age of three his family left Amsterdam for Philadelphia, where his father began a paint and varnish factory. There the young Johann was taught by Emanuel Leutze. In 1838 he returned to Europe and spent six years at the Düsseldorf Academy under Von Schadow and Sohn. At the same time, he took private lessons from the landscape-painter Lessing. In 1846 in Koblenz he married Maria Elisabeth Therese Herrmann. They had four daughters and a son. Besides the painter Thérèse and the sculptor Georgine, their son George Washington also became an artist. Another daughter, Clara Theresia, became the mother of the artists Lizzy Ansingh and Thérèse Ansingh (artist name Sorella). In 1845 he was back in Amsterdam where he became a member of the Koninklijke Academie and in 1847 he became a member of Arti et Amicitiae. He is known for portraits, landscapes, and genre works. Besides his children he is known as the teacher of the painter Maria Vos.

He died in Amsterdam and was buried on 2 September 1874 in the Oosterbegraafplaats, the old cemetery. This cemetery closed before 1900, most bodies removed by 1955 and is now a park and museum with no grave markers. His remains may have been moved to 'De Nieuwe Ooster' where his daughter Theresa is buried.
