= Irish Broadband =

Irish Broadband was a telecommunications company in Ireland providing wireless broadband services.

== History ==
In April 2008, Imagine Communications Group acquired Irish Broadband from National Toll Roads and Kilsaran Concrete.
