= Imagine Communications =

Irish internet service provider

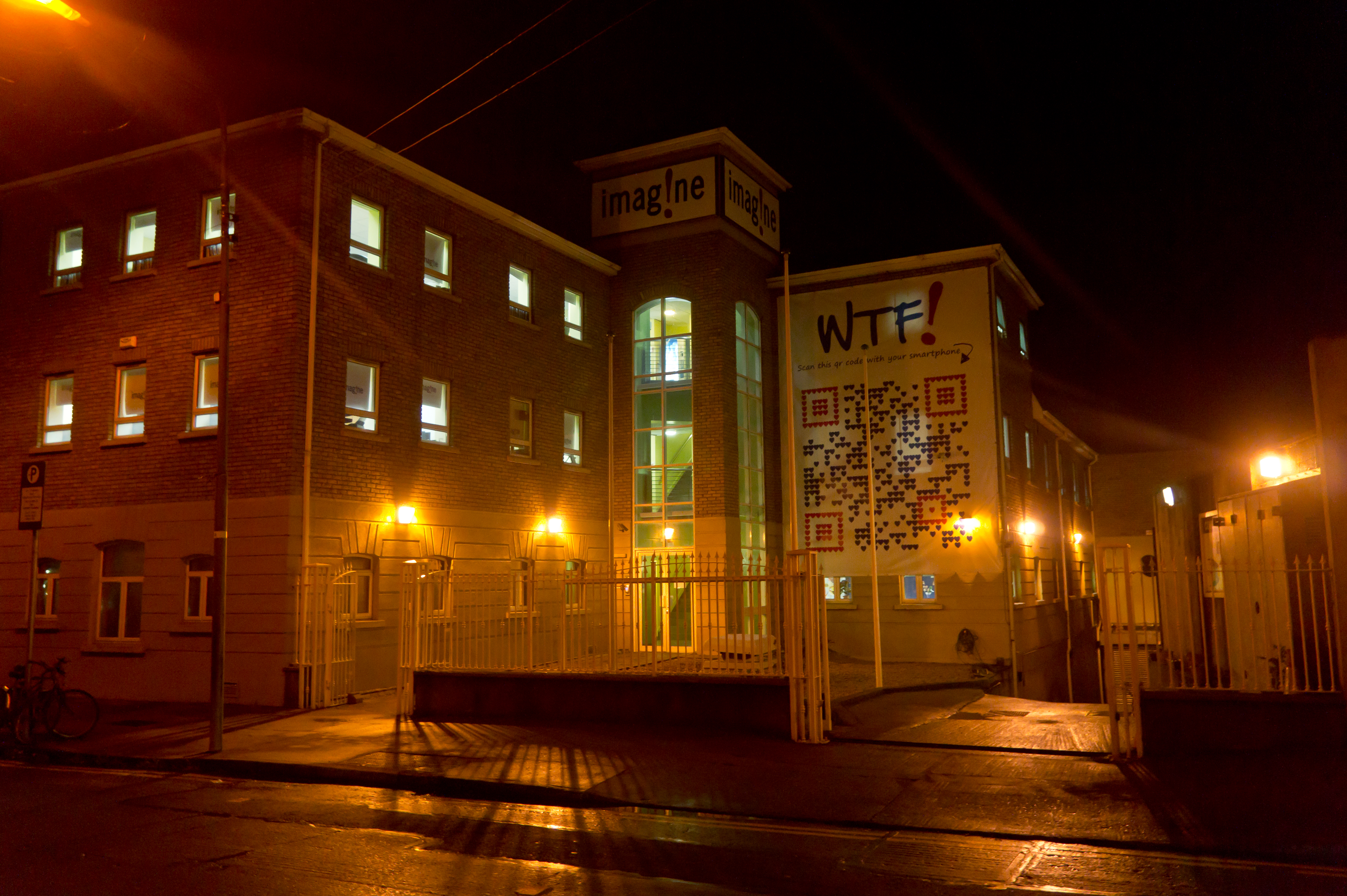
Imagine Communications office building in Dublin at night

Imagine Communications is an Irish internet service provider and telecommunications operator, who provide WiMAX, wireless broadband and resell Eircom telecommunications wholesale packages. The company operates in Ireland, the United Kingdom, the Netherlands, Austria, Norway and the United States.

== Services ==
The company was set up as GTS Ireland on 15 November 1993. Imagine briefly operated the first Irish mobile virtual network, "Cellular 3", which bought airtime from Eircell. A legal challenge ended the arrangement and Imagine exited the mobile market. The "Cellular 3" name was derived from Imagine's de facto position as Ireland's third mobile operator at the time; Meteor Mobile Communications, the third physical operator, had yet to be licensed.

Imagine later became the first company to introduce mobile WiMAX technology to Ireland. As of 2010, the company provides services to 17,000 businesses.

Imagine has affiliations with several brands, including Motorola, HP, and Intel.

== Related companies ==
- Clearwire was acquired by Imagine in 2010
- Irish Broadband was acquired by Imagine in 2008
- Cinergi Telecom was acquired by Imagine in 2007
- Subsidiary Gaelic Telecom, which donates a percentage of each bill to a customer's selected GAA club or National school
- Access Telecom
- Bandwagon (music portal), partially owned as of 2006
- Open Solutions provides network administration and related services
