= Unit of Rehabilitation of Victims of Torture =

The Unit of Rehabilitation of Victims of Torture (URVT) has operated in Cyprus since 2005.

The funding for the establishment of the URVT came originally from the European Council decision to establish the European Refugee Fund (ERF) II for 2005–2010. Cyprus has been participating in the ERF since 2004, with the Asylum Service being appointed as the responsible authority for its implementation. The national program for the implementation of the ERF is mainly focused on actions in the areas of reception of asylum seekers and integration of persons enjoying a form of international protection (including refugees) currently residing in Cyprus.

The Unit was founded with the initiatives of Elia Petridou and Yiannis Laouris and is operated under the Humanitarian Affairs Unit of Future Worlds Center, a non profit, non-governmental organization established in Cyprus.

The URVT operates on the premise that no one shall be "subjected to torture or to cruel, inhuman or degrading treatment or punishment."(Article 5, Universal Declaration of Human Rights, 1948)

The URVT is dedicated to helping victims of torture and their families rebuild their lives, regardless of race, national origin, religion, gender, sexual orientation, or economic or legal status.

== The victims ==
For the Unit, a victim of torture is anyone who has experienced any form of torture, which is defined as "any act by which severe pain and suffering, whether physical or mental is intentionally inflicted on a person for such purposes as obtaining from him or a third person information or a confession, punishing him for an act he or a third person committed or is suspected of having committed, or intimidating or coercing him or a third person."

Victims of torture in Cyprus are mainly asylum seekers and therefore have applied for protection in Cyprus in accordance to the asylum procedures as stipulated in the Cyprus Refugee Law 2000. In accordance to the Refugee law as well as Cyprus' EU and International obligations the element of torture must be examined and taken into consideration when examining an asylum seeker's application for asylum. If torture is found then the person should not be returned to their country of origin and should be granted refugee status, or other status depending on the other elements of the case. The victims that are treated by the URVT are asylum seekers and recognized refugees, and the vast majority are referred to us by the Asylum Service, Ministry of Interior, which is the proper authority that examines asylum claims. The referral is based on an obligation stipulated in the Cyprus Refugee Law according to which when an applicant claims torture the Asylum Service must refer him/her to a specialist doctor. In lack of any other specialist, the Asylum Service fulfills this obligation by referring asylum seekers who claim torture to URVT. The Unit operates closely with the Office of the United Nations High Commissioner for Refugees in Nicosia.

Torture victims arriving in Cyprus are mainly, Kurds from Turkey, Kurds from Syria, Syrians (Arab), Iranians, Palestinians. We have also had cases from Cameroon, Sierra Leone and Pakistan.

The URVT follows the definition on torture and the procedures as stipulated in the Istanbul Protocol.
