= Peter Schwartze =

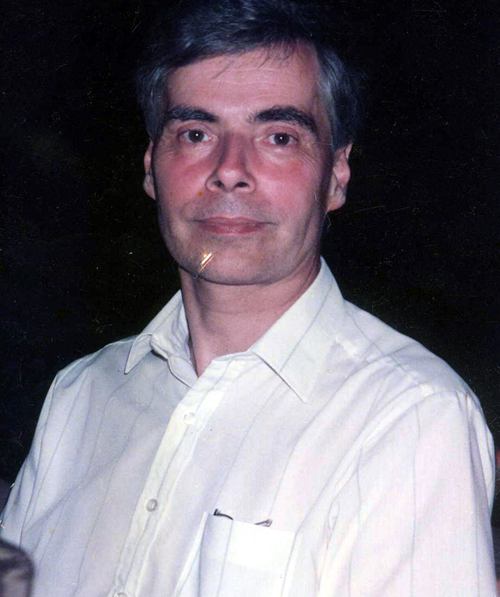
- Born: 23 May 1931 (age 95); Bad Salzuflen, Free State of Lippe, Germany
- Education: Leipzig University
- Scientific career
- Fields: Neurophysiology; Vestibular system Biocybernetics
- Workplaces: Carl Ludwig Institute of Physiology
- Notable students: Yiannis Laouris

Peter Heinrich Schwartze (born 23 May 1931 in Bad Salzuflen) is a German neurophysiologist, systems scientist and cyberneticist well known in the ex-German Democratic Republic. Schwartze graduated the medical university in Leipzig, Germany, in 1957 and specialized in neurophysiology. He studied and worked at the universities of Rostock, Greifswald and Leipzig. He became Doctor Habilitatus of the University Leipzig, Germany in 1968 and Professor of Pathophysiology in 1978 and served as the director of the Carl Ludwig Institute of Physiology between 1980 and 1992 as successor of Hans Drischel.

Prof. Schwartze also served as member of the East German Parliament between 1980 and 1990, in the Cultural Association fraction.

== Scientific contributions ==
Schwartze studied the vestibular apparatus, the air-righting reflex and related spinal reflexes for over 30 years. He published hundreds of scientific reports (mostly in German journals) and a number of scientific and text books on issues of brain development, vestibulo-ocular reflexes and cybernetics.) He served as vice president of the Society for Experimental Research between 1978 and 81 and also served as member of the editorial board of many journals such as Pediatrics and Related Topics Journal and International Tinnitus Journal.
