= Cyprus Civil Society Awards =

Cyprus civil society awards
- Awarded for: Outstanding contributions of NGOs and their leaders in six domains.
- Country: Cyprus
- Presented by: The Management Centre; NGO Support Centre; INTRAC
- First award: 2007
- Website: Announcement by USAID

The Cyprus Civil Society Awards were established in 2007 as part of a United Nations-funded project aiming to strengthen the role of civil society in Cyprus. One organization from the Greek Cypriot and one organization from the Turkish Cypriot community was each presented an award for their contribution to social development in six unique categories:

1. education and culture
2. environment
3. gender issues
4. health
5. youth
6. social inclusion

The awards have been established in order to promote reconciliation and facilitate interactions between the non-governmental organization between the two conflicting communities on the island. The awards are managed and presented by a consortium consisting of The Management Centre from the Turkish Cypriot community, the NGO Support Centre< from the Greek Cypriot community and INTRAC from the UK.
