= Uwe Windhorst =

German neuroscientist

- Born: 1946 (age 79–80); Bremen, Germany
- Education: University of Göttingen
- Awards: Distinguished Professor in 1987
- Scientific career
- Fields: Medicine and Systems Physiology
- Doctoral advisors: H.-D. Henatsch and J. Meyer-Lohmann

Uwe Windhorst is a German neuroscientist, systems scientist and cyberneticist, who was born in Bremen, Germany in 1946. Windhorst became known for his pioneer research in the use of diverse methods of correlation, spectral analysis as well as nonlinear systems analysis to describe the dynamic properties of signal transmission through small neuronal networks assessed in experimental animals.

== Contributions in Neurophysiology ==
Windhorst's research has revolved around the control of skeletal muscle contraction based on sensory signal arising in muscles and skin and on neuronal networks predominantly in the spinal cord and brainstem. In this wider context, one line of research strived to elucidate the dynamic signal processing of the participating neurons, such as muscle spindles, motoneurons and interneurons (particularly Renshaw cells) and their importance for oscillatory process such as tremor. Related issues were the plastic properties of such networks and their modulation by signals arising in the peripheral and central nervous system, specifically in the context of muscle fatigue. A related aspect of research concerned the origin of muscle pain and its effects on spinal neurons. In addition to experimental studies, computer modeling was used to unravel the properties of small neuronal networks, especially with respect to tremor.

== Education ==
Between 1968 and 1974, he studied medicine at the University of Göttingen in Germany, where he also earned his PhD and his Habilitation in Neurophysiology. He became Distinguished Professor in 1987.

== List of major works ==
- Windhorst, U. and Schwestka, R. (1982): Interactions between motor units in modulating discharge patterns of primary muscle spindle endings. Exp. Brain Res. 45, 417 427
- Christakos, C.N. and Windhorst, U. (1986): The information carried by spindle afferents on motor unit activity as revealed by spectral analysis. Brain Res. 367, 52 62
- Hamm, T.M., Sasaki, S., Stuart, D.G., Windhorst, U. and Yuan, C. S. (1987): The measurement of single motor axon recurrent inhibitory post synaptic potentials in the cat. J. Physiol. 388, 631 651
- Windhorst, U., Rissing, R., Meyer Lohmann, J., Laouris, Y. and Kuipers, U. (1988): Facilitation and depression in the responses of spinal Renshaw cells to random stimulation of motor axons. J. Neurophysiol. 60, 1638 1652
- Laouris, Y., Windhorst, U., Rissing, R., Kuipers, U. and Meyer Lohmann, J. (1988): Time constants of facilitation and depression in Renshaw cell responses to random stimulation of motor axons. Exp. Brain Res. 72, 117 128
- Laouris, Y. and Windhorst, U. (1989): The relationship between coherence and nonlinear characteristics in Renshaw cell responses to random motor axon stimulation. Neurosci. 28, 625 633
- Richter, D.W., Bischoff, A., Anders, K., Bellingham, M. and Windhorst, U. (1991): Response of the medullary respiratory network of the cat to hypoxia. J. Physiol. 443, 231–256
- Windhorst, U., Kirmayer, D., Soibelman, F., Misri, A. and Rose, R. (1997): Effects of neurochemically excited group III-IV muscle afferents on motoneuron afterhyperpolarization. Neurosci. 76, 915–929
- Roatta, S., Windhorst, U., Ljubisavljevic, M., Johansson, H., Passatore, M. (2002) Sympathetic modulation of muscle spindle afferent sensitivity to stretch in rabbit jaw closing muscles. J. Physiol. 540.1: 237–248
- Kalezic, I., Bugaychenko, L.A., Kostyukov, A.I., Pilyavskii, A.I., Ljubisavljevic, M., Windhorst, U., and Johansson, H. (2003) Fatigue-related depression of the feline monosynaptic gastrocnemius-soleus reflex. J. Physiol. (Lond) 556:283-296
- Pilyavskii, A.I., Maznychenko, A.V., Maisky, V.A., Kostyukov, A.I., Hellström, F., and Windhorst, U. (2005) Capsaicin-induced effects on c-fos expression and NADPH-diaphorase activity in the feline spinal cord. Eur. J. Pharmacol. 521:70-78
- Kostyukov, A.I., Bugaychenko, L.A., Kalezic, I., Pilyavskii, A.I., Windhorst, U., and Djupsjöbacka, M. (2005) Effects in feline gastrocnemius-soleus motoneurones induced by muscle fatigue. Exp. Brain Res. 163:284-294
- Vieira, T.M., Windhorst, U., and Merletti, R. (2010) Is the stabilization of quiet upright stance in humans driven by synchronized modulations of the activity of medial and lateral gastrocnemius muscles? J Appl Physiol 108:85-97

== Reviews ==
- Windhorst, U., Hamm, T.M. and Stuart, D.G. (1989): On the function of muscle and reflex partitioning. Beh. Brain Sci. 12, 629 645
- Windhorst, U. (1996): The spinal cord and its brain: representations and models. To what extent do forebrain mechanisms appear at brainstem and spinal cord levels? Prog. Neurobiol. 49, 381–414
- Windhorst, U. (1996): On the role of recurrent inhibitory feedback in motor control. Prog. Neurobiol. 49, 517–587
- Windhorst, U. (2007) Muscle proprioceptive feedback and spinal networks. Brain Res. Bull. 73:155-202

== Books written and edited ==
- Windhorst, U. (1988): How brain like is the spinal cord? Interacting cell assemblies in the nervous system. Springer Verlag; Berlin, Heidelberg, New York, London, Paris, Tokyo
- Greger, R. and Windhorst U. (eds.) (1996) Comprehensive human physiology. From cellular mechanisms to integration. Springer-Verlag; Berlin, Heidelberg
- Windhorst, U. and Johansson, H. (eds.) Modern techniques in neuroscience research. Springer-Verlag; Berlin, Heidelberg 1999
- Johansson, H., Windhorst, U., Djupsjöbacka, M., and Passatore, M. (eds.) Chronic work-related myalgia. Neuromuscular mechanisms behind work-related chronic muscle pain syndromes. Gävle University Press, Gävle (Sweden) 2003
- Binder MD, Hirokawa N, Windhorst U (eds) Encyclopedia of neuroscience. Springer-Verlag; Berlin Heidelberg 2009
