= Georgine Schwartze =

Dutch sculptor

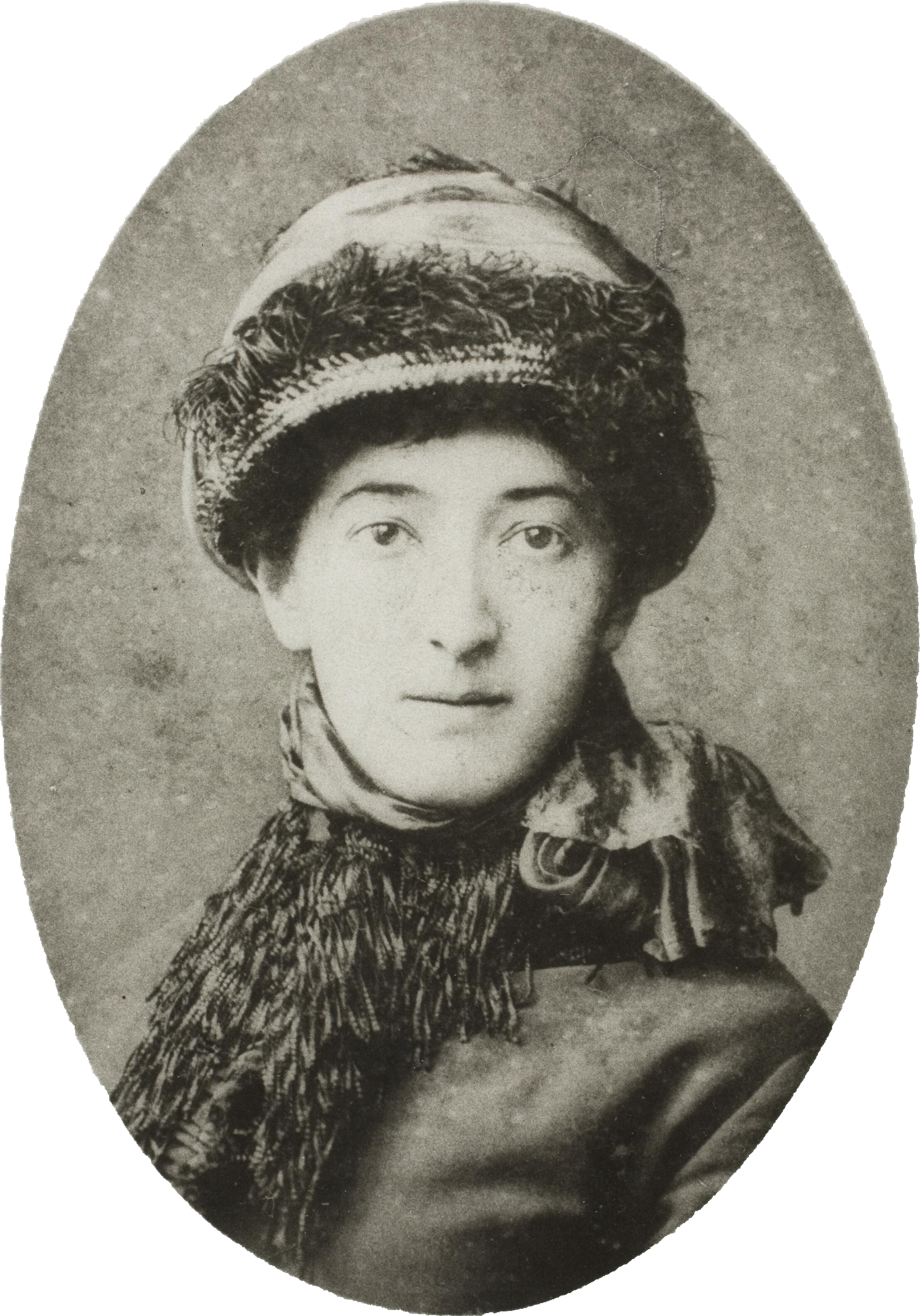
- Born: 12 April 1854; Amsterdam
- Died: 8 August 1935 (aged 81)
- Education: Rijksakademie van beeldende kunsten

Georgine Schwartze (12 April 1854 – 8 August 1935) was a Dutch sculptor. She is most notable for her design and execution of a marble tomb for her sister Thérèse which was declared a national monument by the Dutch government.

== Biography ==
Born in Amsterdam on 12 April 1854, Georgine grew up in an artistically inclined family. She was the daughter of painter Johann Georg Schwartze, and her older sister Thérèse went on to become a prominent portraitist. As opposed to her father and sister, Georgine was more interested in sculpting as well as painting, and so she enrolled at the Rijksakademie van beeldende kunsten. While learning there, she was particularly influenced by the work of sculptor and painter Ferdinand Leenhoff. Following her education, Georgine became a portraitist and sculptor. She was inducted into the Arti et Amicitiae. After her sister died in 1918, Georgine rendered a tomb for her in marble. The tomb, located in Amsterdam New Eastern Cemetery, is considered a national monument (Rijksmonument) by the Dutch government.
