= Thérèse Schwartze =

Dutch painter (1851–1918)

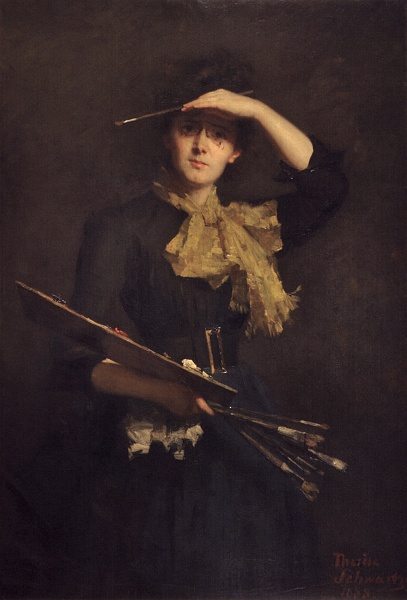
- Self-portrait at age 37
- Born: 20 December 1851; Amsterdam, Netherlands
- Died: 23 December 1918 (aged 67); Amsterdam, Netherlands
- Known for: Painting

Thérèse Schwartze (20 December 1851 – 23 December 1918) was a Dutch portrait painter.

== Life ==
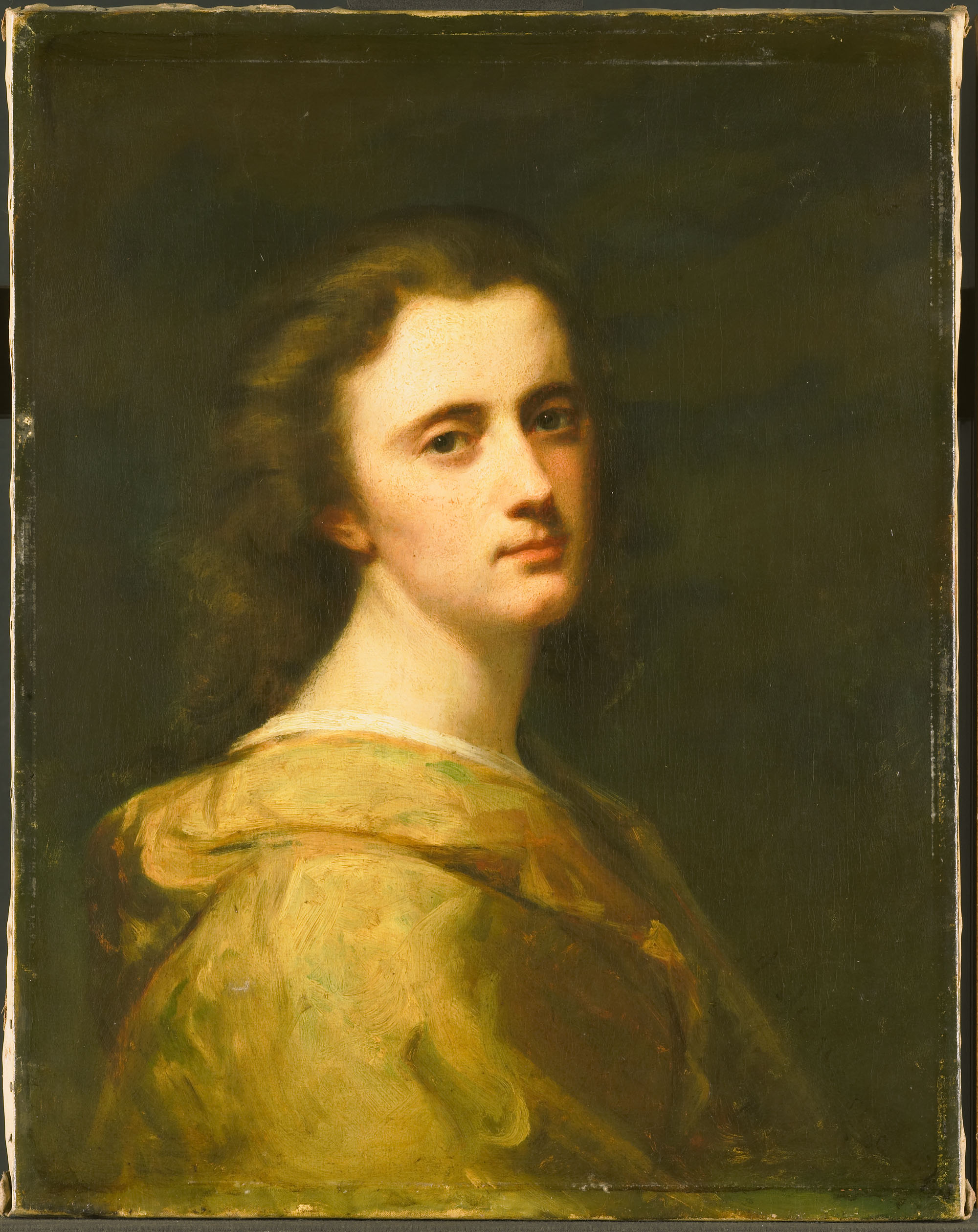
Thérèse Schwartze at 16 by her father

Thérèse Schwartze was born on 20 December 1851 in Amsterdam in the Netherlands. She was the daughter of the painter Johan Georg Schwartze, who grew up in Philadelphia and trained in Düsseldorf.

Schwartze received her first training from her father, before studying for a year at the Rijksacademie van Beeldende Kunsten. She then travelled to Munich and studied under Gabriel Max and Franz von Lenbach. In 1879 she went to Paris to continue her studies under Jean-Jacques Henner. When she returned to Amsterdam she became a member of Arti et Amicitiae. Schwartze exhibited her work at the Palace of Fine Arts at the 1893 World's Columbian Exposition in Chicago, Illinois.

== Death ==
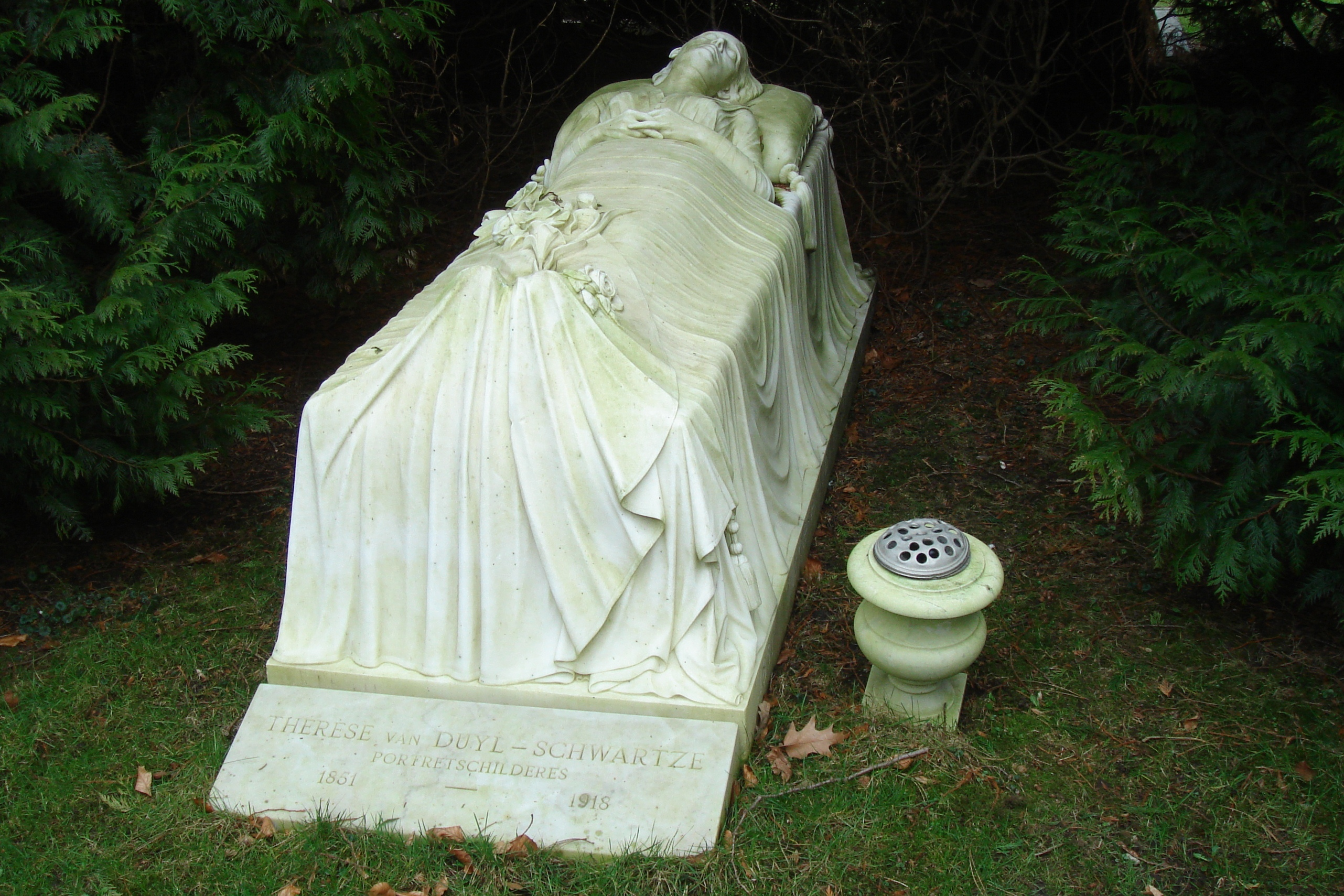
Grave of Thérèse by Georgine, today a rijksmonument

On 22 July 1918 her husband, Anton van Duyl, died. As Schwartze was in bad health at that time (and tried to hide this), the death of her husband was a blow that she could not overcome easily. She died in Amsterdam on 23 December 1918 from a sudden illness.

Schwartze was buried at Zorgvlied cemetery in Amsterdam. Later she was reburied at the Nieuwe Ooster cemetery in Amsterdam, where her sister created a memorial to her, modelled after her death mask, which is now a rijksmonument.

== Works ==
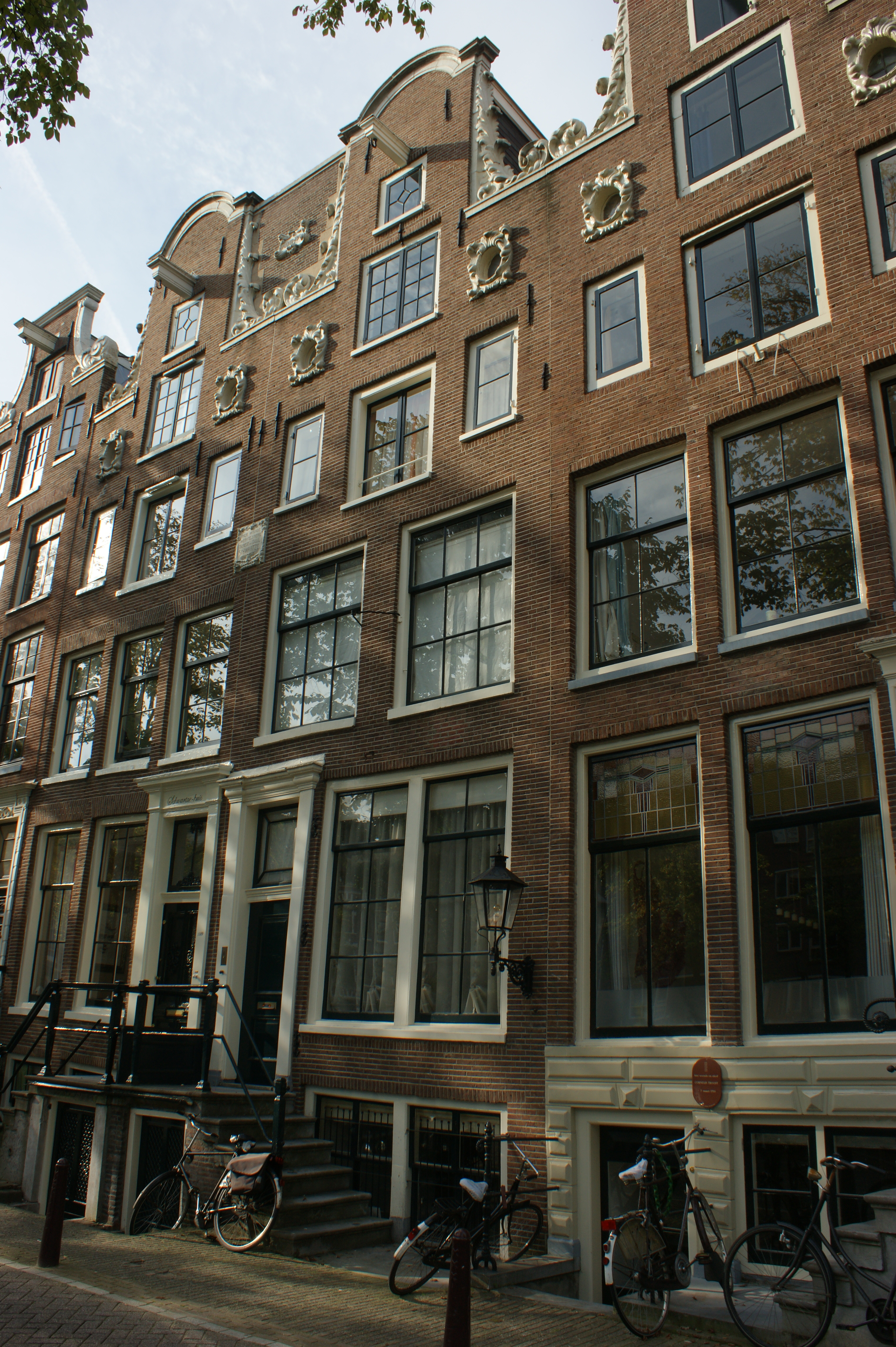
Her home

Her portraits, mostly of Amsterdam's elite, are remarkable for excellent character drawing, breadth and vigour of handling and rich quality of pigment. She signed her works "Th. Schwartze" and was married late in life in 1906 to Anton van Duyl, whereupon she signed works with "Th. v Duyl.Schwartze".

She was one of the few women painters who had been honoured by an invitation to contribute their portraits to the hall of painters at the Uffizi Gallery in Florence. Some of her best pictures, notably a portrait of Piet J Joubert, and Three Inmates of the Orphanage at Amsterdam, are at the Rijksmuseum, and one entitled Five Amsterdam Orphans at the Boijmans Van Beuningen Museum in Rotterdam.

Her niece Lizzy Ansingh, daughter of her sister painter Clara Theresa Schwartze, who she painted a few times, also became a painter. Her sister Georgine Schwartze became a sculptor. She lived with her extended family at Prinsengracht 1901 in Amsterdam and painted her housemates in 1915:

Works of Thérèse Schwartze by museum

- Jewish antique dealer, Joods Historisch Museum
- Portrait of Mozes de Vries van Buren, Joods Historisch Museum
- Portrait of Abraham Carel Wertheim, Joods Historisch Museum
- Portrait of P. M. Wertheim-Wertheim, Joods Historisch Museum
- Portrait of Dr. J.L. Dusseau (1870), Rijksmuseum
- Young Italian woman with the dog Puck (1879), Rijksmuseum
- Portrait of Peter Marius Tutein Nolthenius (1879/1880), Rijksmuseum
- Portrait of Frederik Daniël Otto Obreen (1883), Rijksmuseum
- Three Inmates of the Orphanage at Amsterdam (1885), Rijksmuseum
- Portrait of Dr. P.J.H. Cuypers (1885), Rijksmuseum
- Portrait of Alida Elisabeth Grevers (1889), Rijksmuseum
- Portrait of Piet Joubert (1890), Rijksmuseum
- Portrait of Paul Joseph Constantin Gabriël (1899), Rijksmuseum
- Portrait of Amelia Eliza van Leeuwen (1900), Rijksmuseum
- Portrait of Lizzie Ansingh (1902), Rijksmuseum
- Portrait of Maria Catharina Josephine Jordan (1902), Rijksmuseum
- Portrait of C.M van der Goot-Mabé Grevingh (1883), Teylers Museum
- Several drawings, Leiden University
- Portrait of Prof Adriaan Heynsius (1883), Leiden University
- Portrait of Prof Gustaaf Schlegel (c. 1900), Leiden University
- Portrait of Prof A.P.N. Franchimont (1899), Leiden University
- Portrait of Prof. M.J. de Goeje (c. 1905), Leiden University
- Portrait of Prof Blok (1914), Leiden University

== Gallery ==
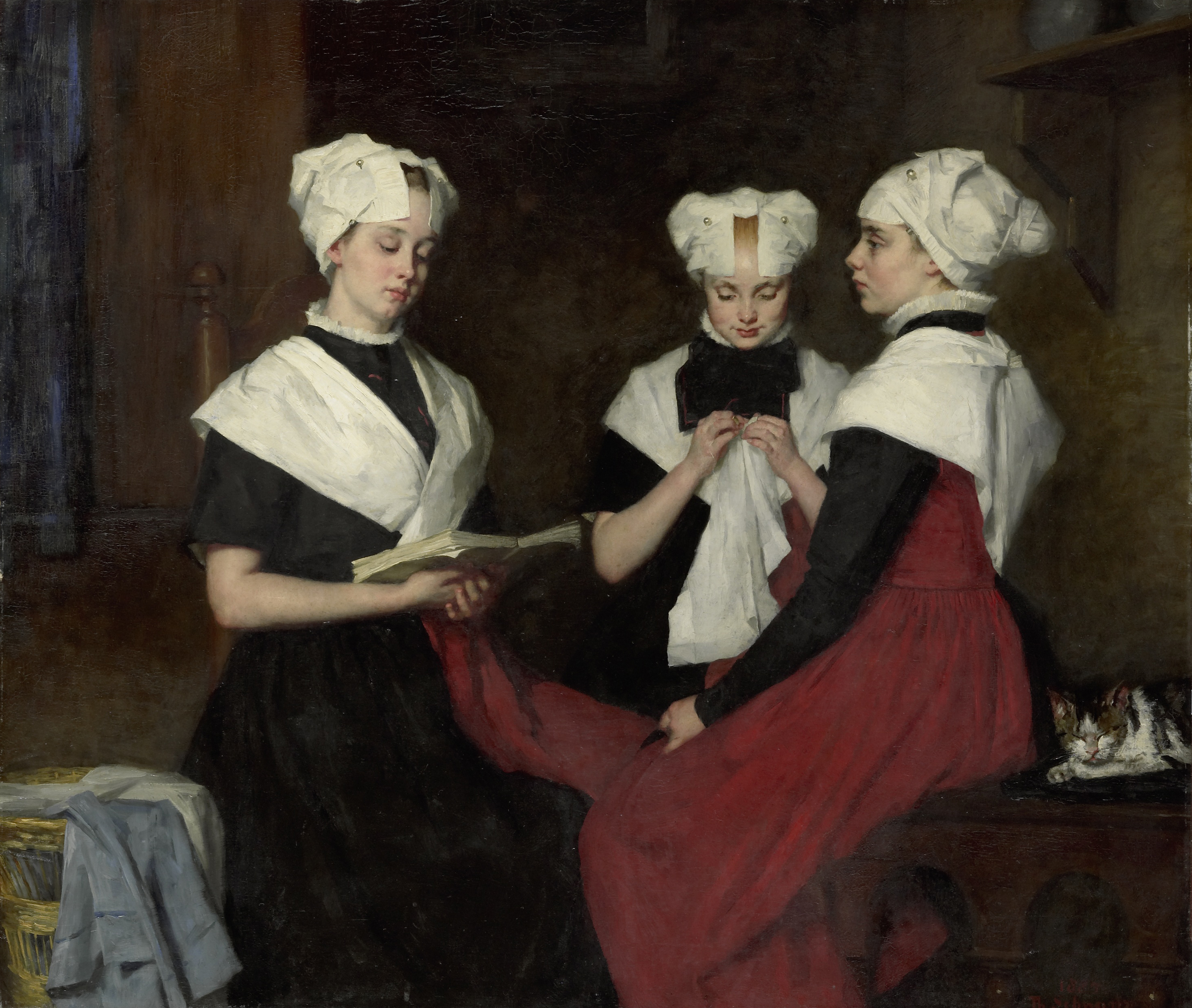
Three Inmates of the Orphanage at Amsterdam (1885)

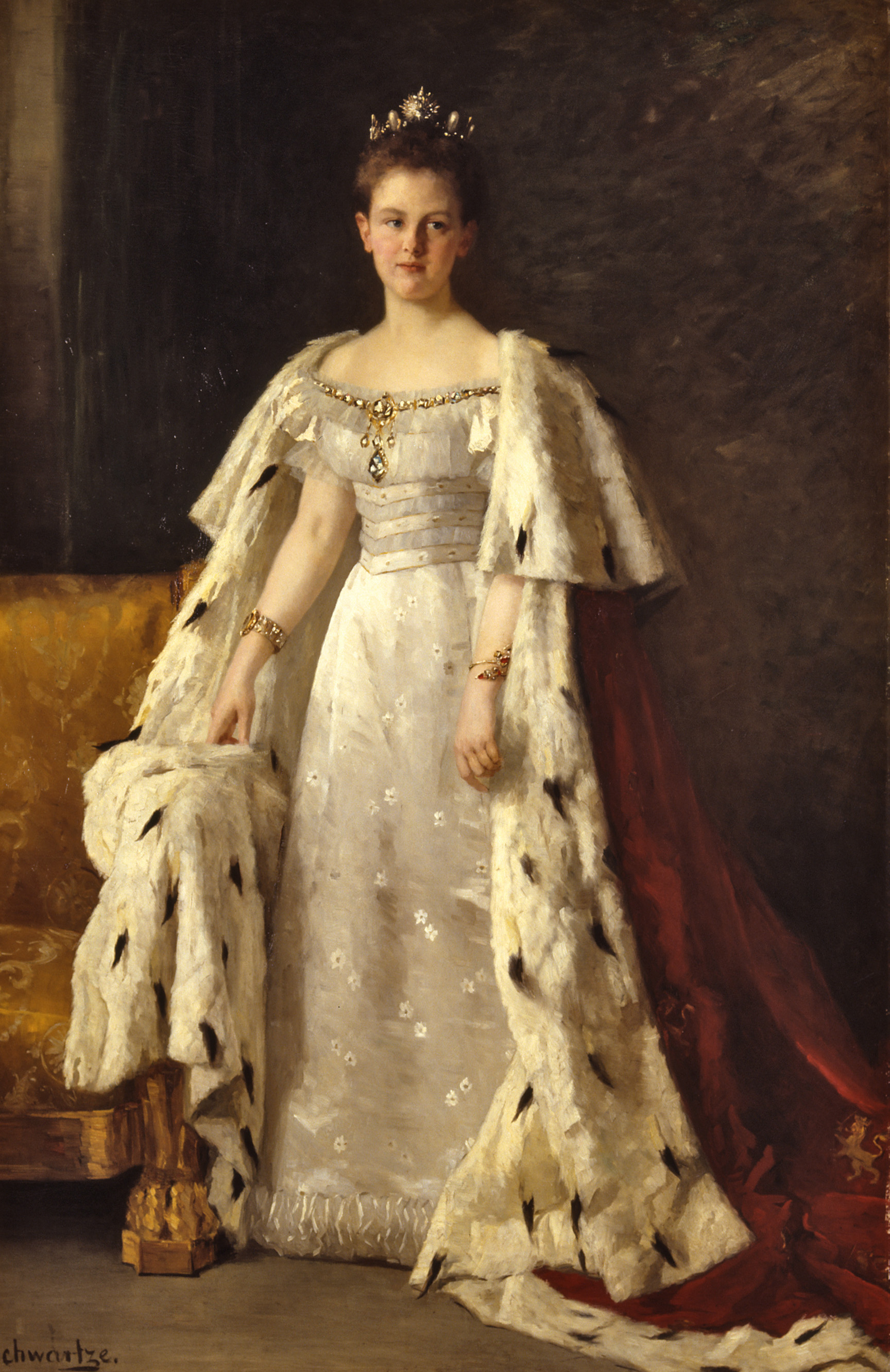
Queen Wilhelmina (1898)

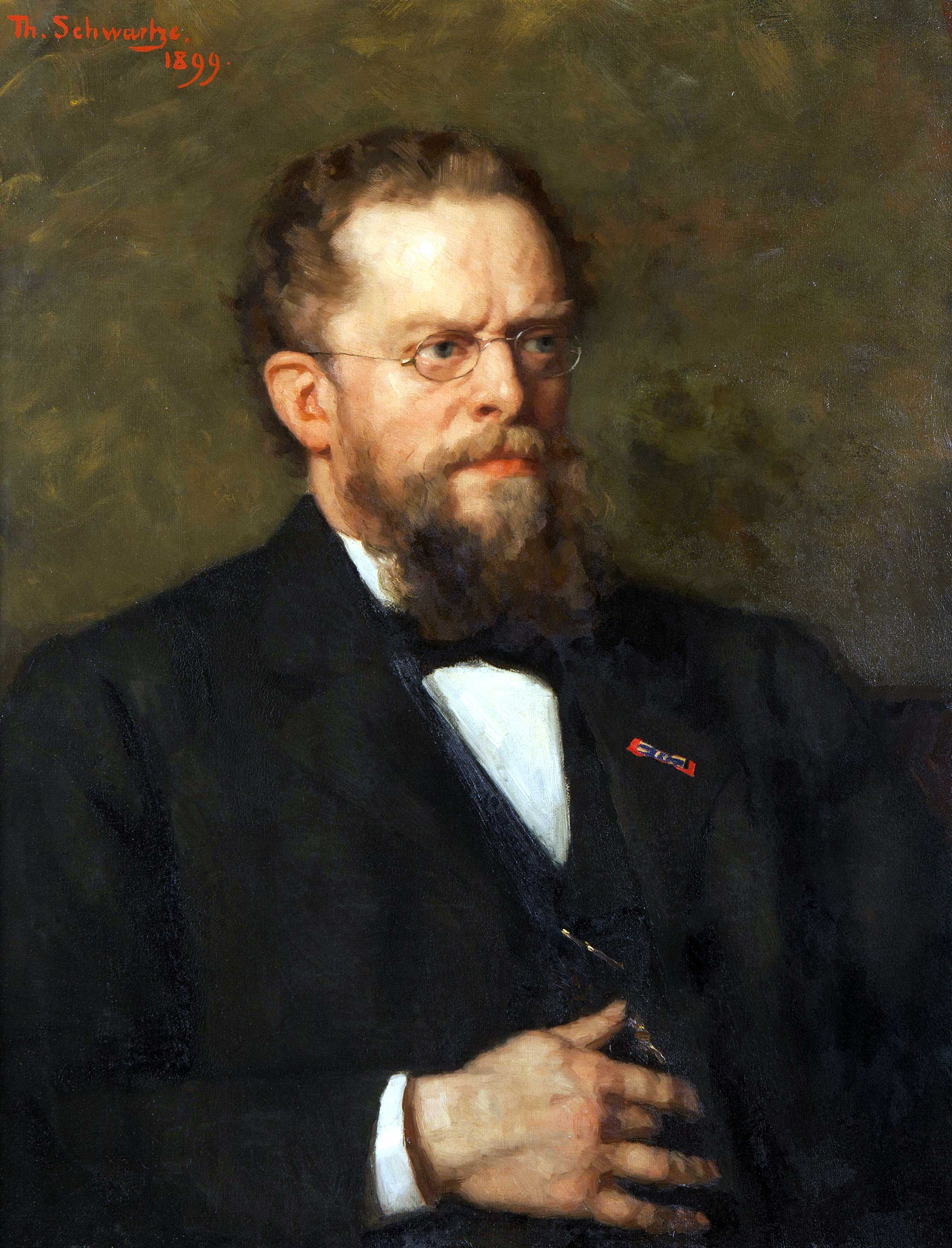
Prof. Franchimont (1899)

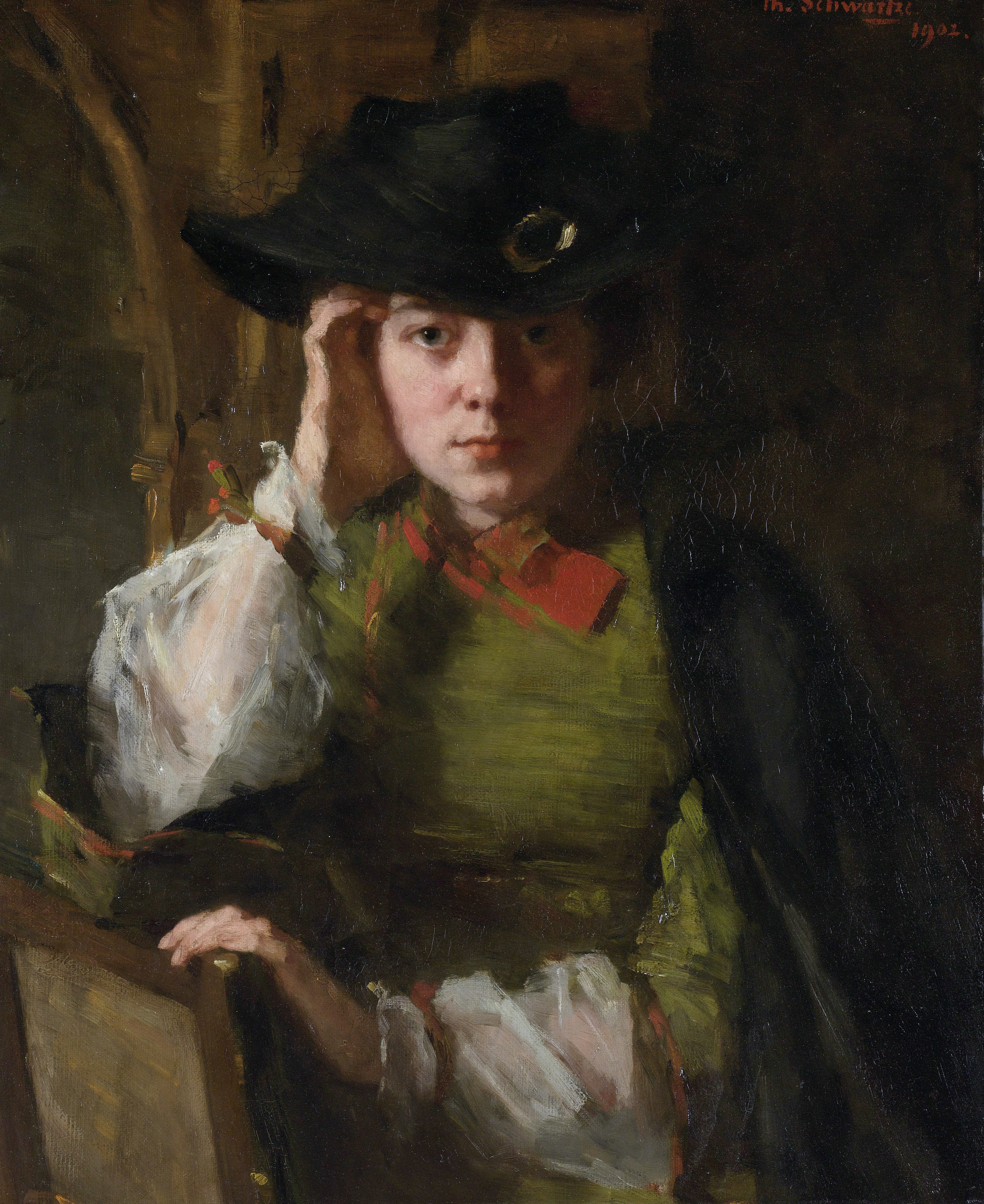
Portrait of Lizzy (1902)

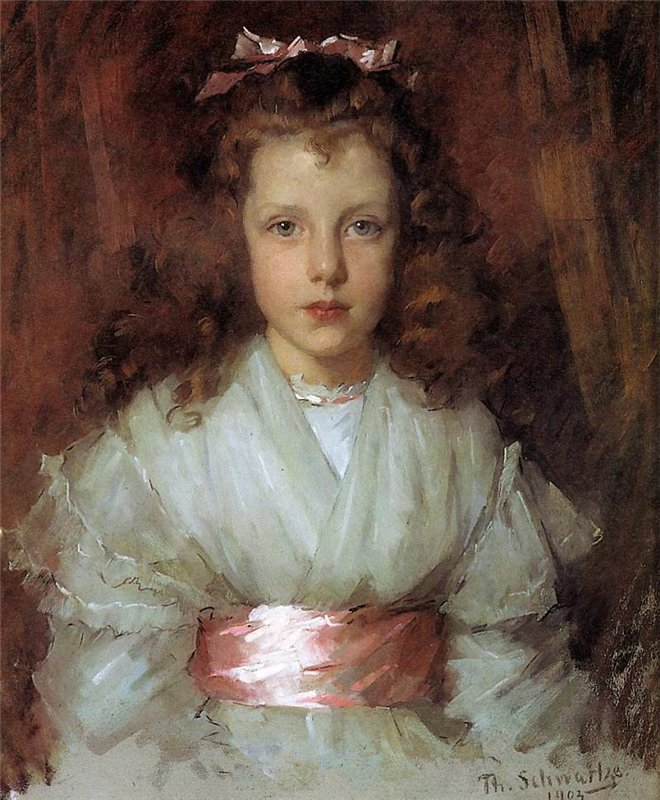
Portrait of Geradine Marguerite van Hardenbroek (1903)

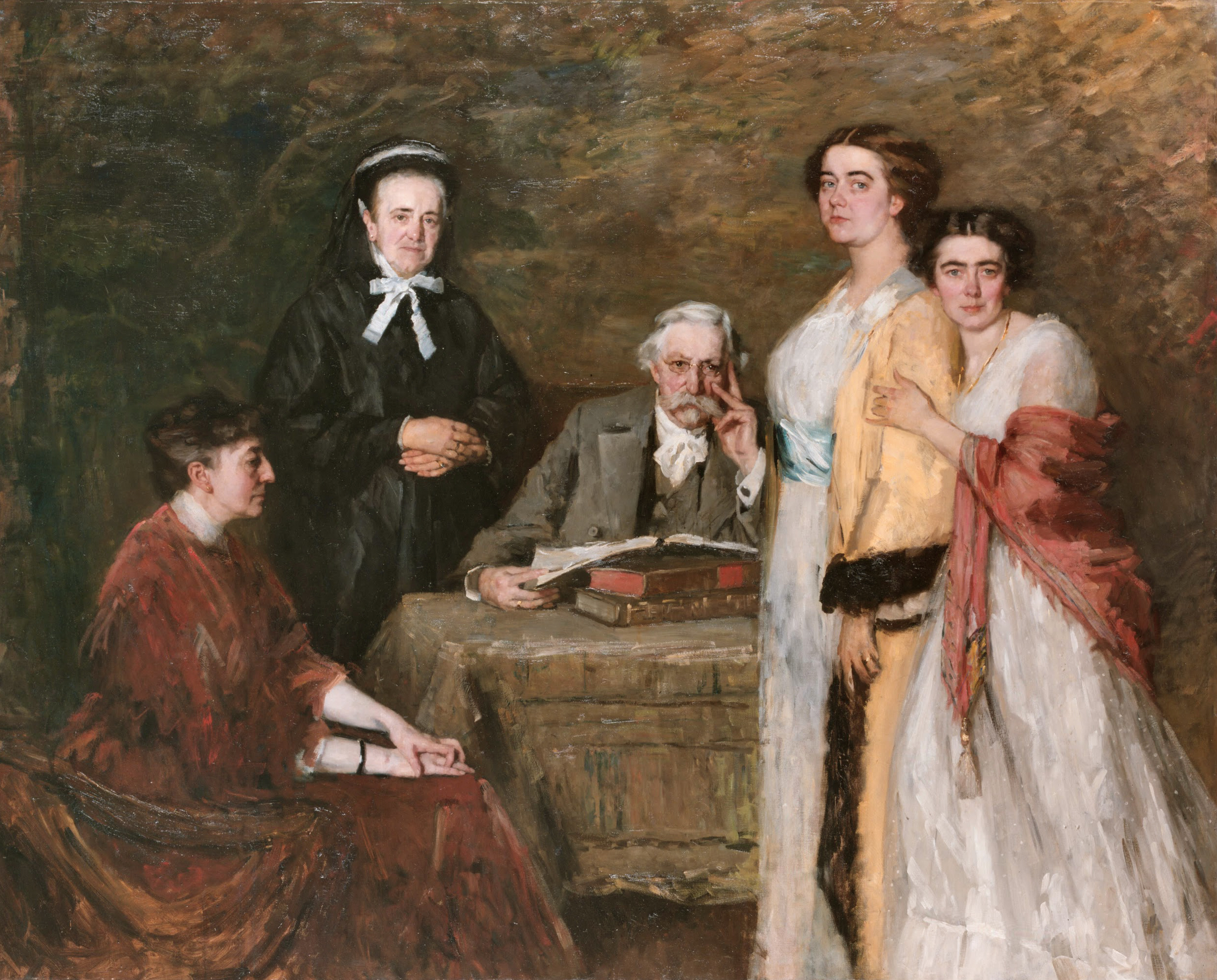
The Inmates of my House (1915)

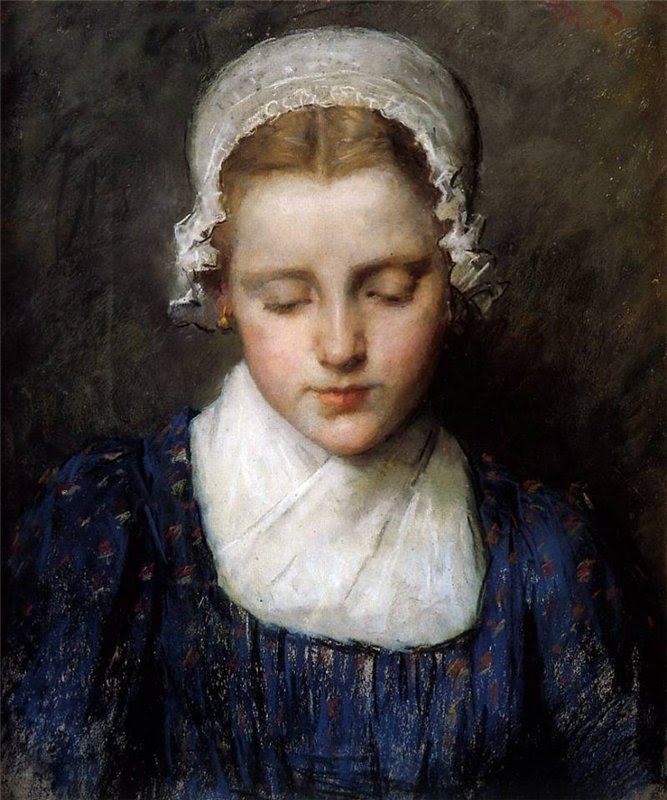
Portrait of a Girl (1918)

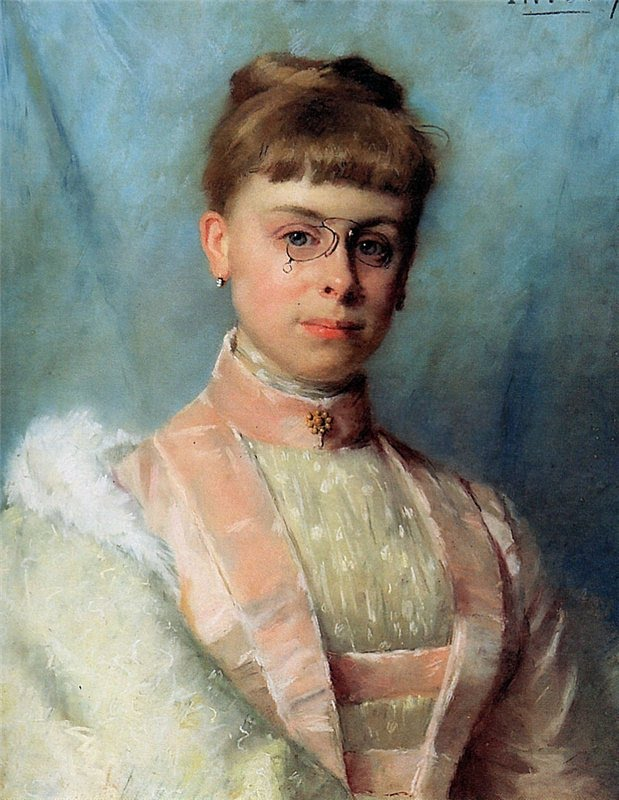
Portrait of Johanna Eugenia Theadora Van Hoorn Schouwe (1918)

== Sources ==
- Hollema, Cora and Kouwenhoven, Pieternel, Thérèse Schwartze, Painting for a Living, 2nd edn Amsterdam 2021, ISBN 978-90-824064-1-2, www.thereseschwartze.com
