= Insafe =

Insafe is a European network of Awareness Centres promoting safer and better usage of internet. It is co-funded by the Safer Internet Plus Programme.

== Mission ==
The mission of the Insafe cooperation network is to empower citizens to use the Internet and other online technologies positively, safely, and effectively. The network calls for shared responsibility for the protection of the rights and needs of citizens (children in particular) with the government, educators, parents, media, and all other relevant actors. Particular emphasis is given to the elimination of child pornography. Insafe partners work closely together to share best practices, information, and resources. The network interacts with industry, schools, and families with the aim of empowering people to bridge the digital divide between home and school and between generations.

Insafe partners monitor and address emerging trends while seeking to reinforce the image of the web as a place to learn. They endeavour to raise awareness about reporting harmful or illegal content and services. Through close cooperation between partners and other actors, Insafe aims to raise Internet safety-awareness standards and support the development of information literacy for all.

== Operation ==
Each country in the Insafe network has a national Awareness Centre which is responsible for implementing campaigns, coordinating actions, developing synergy at the national level, and working in close co-operation with all relevant actors at European, regional and local level.

Both Insafe and all National Centres enjoy funding from the Safer internet Program of the European Commission.European Schoolnet has been granted the role of Coordinator of the network at the European level.

== Actions ==
The Insafe network organises the Safer Internet Day, which has taken place annually on the second day of the second week of February since 2004 and also involves numerous countries outside Europe. In 2022, the theme for Safer Internet Day was "Improving Well-Being Online"; focusing on cyberbullying, misinformation, and youth activism.

== Awareness Centres ==
- Austria
- Belgium
- Bulgaria
- Cyprus
- Czech Republic
- Denmark
- Finland
- France
- Germany
- Greece
- Hungary
- Iceland
- India
- Ireland
- Italy
- Latvia
- Lithuania
- Luxembourg
- Netherlands
- Norway
- Poland
- Portugal
- Romania
- Slovakia
- Slovenia
- Spain
- Sweden
- Ukraine
- United Arab Emirates
- United Kingdom
