= Amsterdam Impressionism =

19th-century Dutch art movement

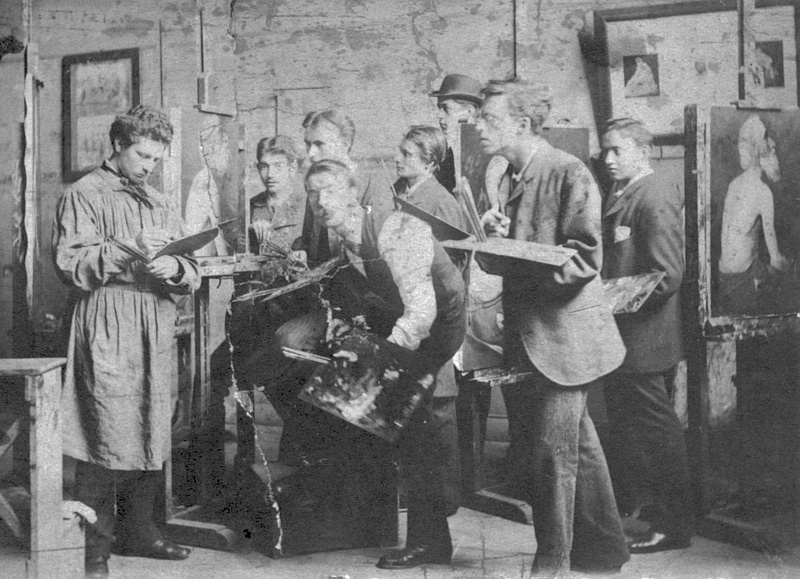
Students of the Rijksacademie Amsterdam (1882/83).

Amsterdam Impressionism was an art movement in the late 19th-century Netherlands. It is associated especially with George Hendrik Breitner and is also known as the School of Allebé.

The innovative ideas about painting of the French Impressionists were introduced into the Netherlands by the artists of the Hague School. This new style of painting was also adopted in Amsterdam by the young generation of artists of the late 19th century. Like their French colleagues, these Amsterdam painters put their impressions onto canvas with rapid, visible strokes of the brush. They focused on depicting the everyday life of the city.

== Origins ==
George Hendrik Breitner studied for four-and-a-half years at the Royal Academy of Art in The Hague, and came into contact with artists of the Hague School such as Jozef Israëls, Jacob Maris, and Anton Mauve, joining the Pulchri Studio. Nevertheless his painting style was always too free to be realist in nature, a hallmark of the Hague School. In 1884 he moved briefly to Paris, coming into contact with impressionism, and on his return he settled in Amsterdam where he became noted for his free and energetic depictions of urban life.

Other Amsterdam Impressionists were Floris Verster, Isaac Israëls, Willem Bastiaan Tholen, Kees Heynsius, Willem de Zwart, Willem Witsen, and Jan Toorop, the last an associate of the Belgian painter James Ensor and a member of the Brussels Les XX. Also included in the movement are a group of late-impressionist woman artists called the Amsterdamse Joffers, whose members included Lizzy Ansingh and Suze Bisschop-Robertson.

== Artists ==
These artists belong to the second generation of the Netherlands Impressionism. The Influence of their work was important on the subsequent movement of modern art in the 20th century.

- Pieter Florentius Nicolaas Jacobus Arntzenius (1864-1925)
- Johan Braakensiek (1858-1940)
- Nicolaas Bastert (1854-1939)
- Cornelius de Bruin (1870-1940)
- George Hendrik Breitner (1857-1923)
- Dirk van Haaren (1878-1953)
- Kees Heynsius (1890-1981)
- Richard Roland Holst (1868-1938)
- Isaac Israëls (1865-1934)
- Hendrik Maarten Krabbé (1868-1931)
- Jacobus van Looy (1855-1930)
- Marie Henry Mackenzie (1878-1961)
- Johan Thorn Prikker (1868-1932)
- Hobbe Smith (1862-1942)
- Willem Bastiaan Tholen (1860-1931)
- Johannes Theodorus Toorop (1858-1928)
- Floris Verster (1864-1925)
- Jan Hillebrand Wijsmuller (1855-1925)
- Willem Witsen (1860-1923)
- Willem de Zwart (1862-1931)

== Gallery ==
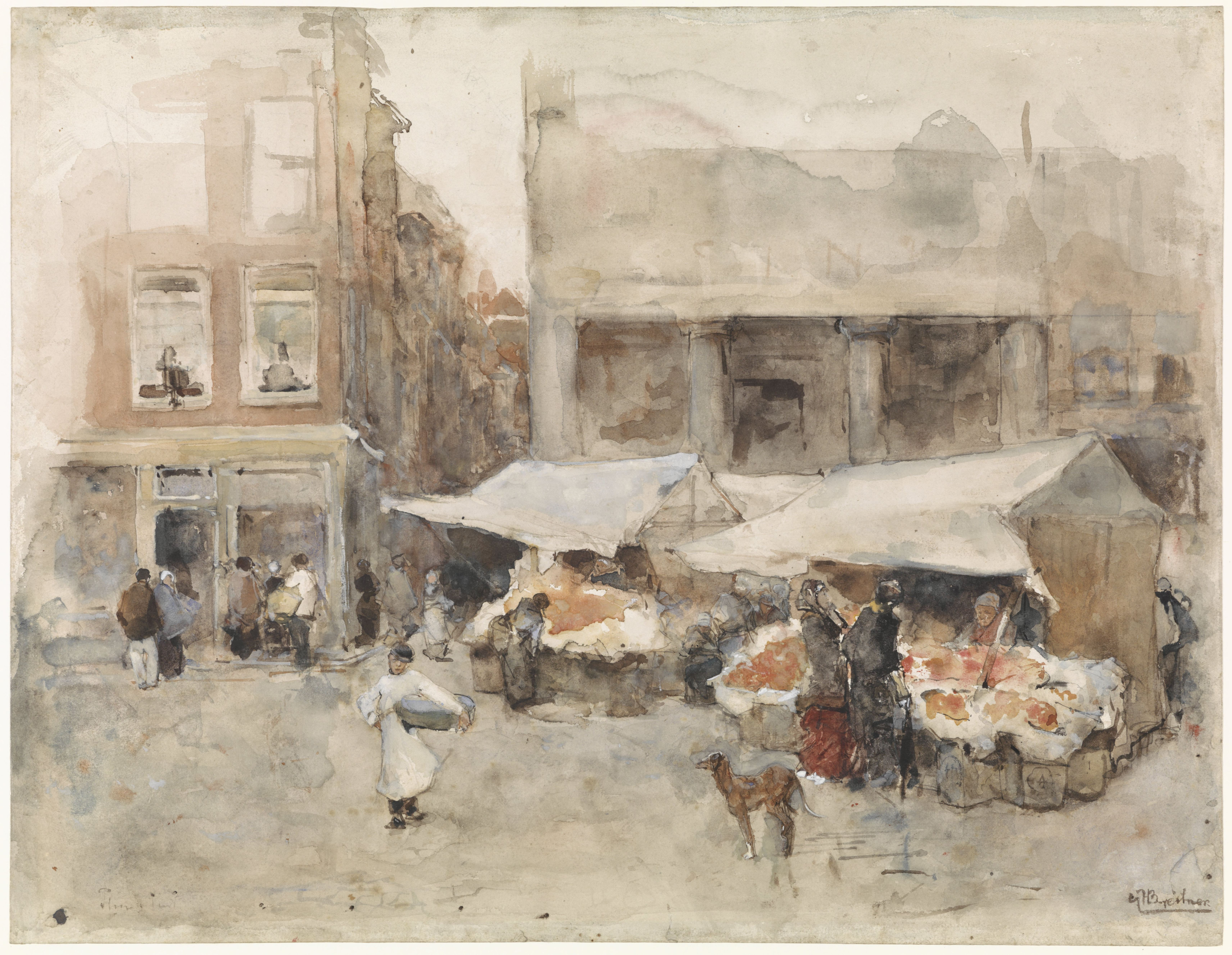
Floris Arntzenius (undated): Marktet with flower stalls, Rijksmuseum Amsterdam.

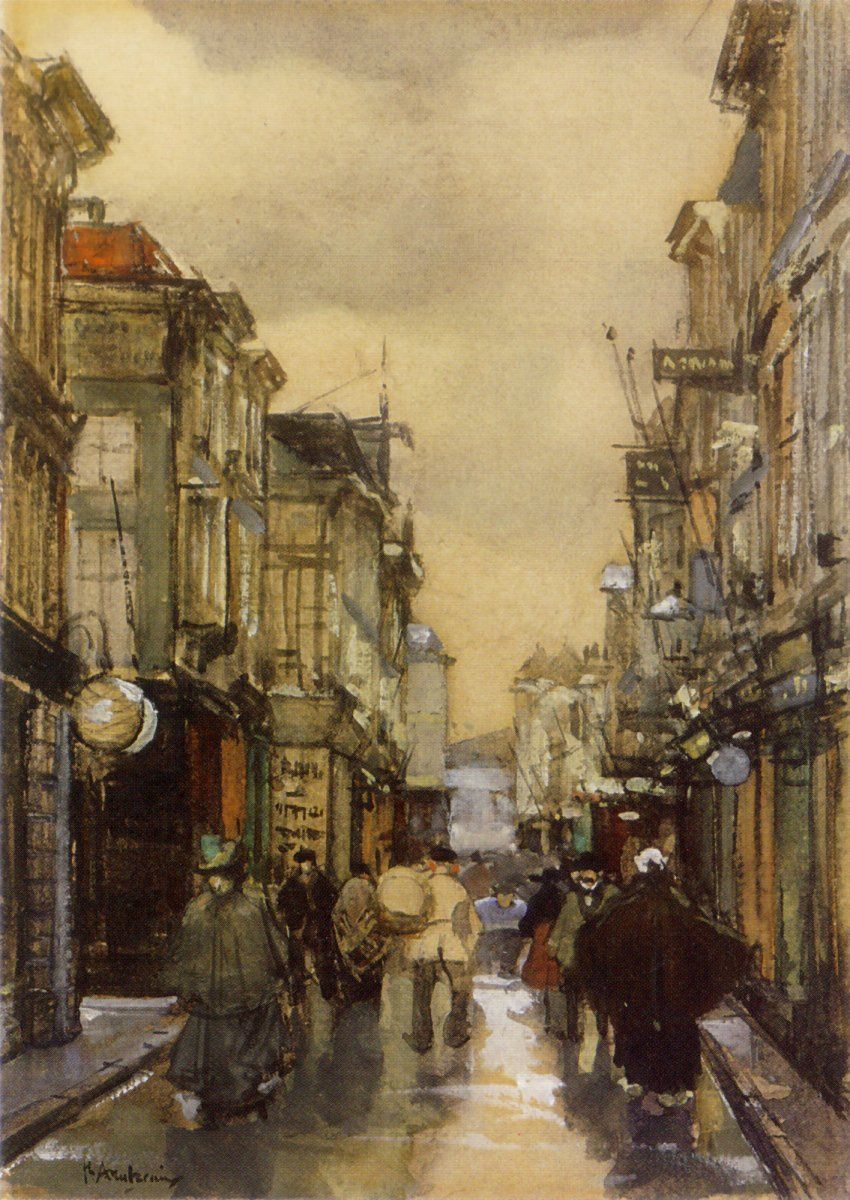
Floris Arntzenius (undated): Spuistraat in Den Haag, private collection.

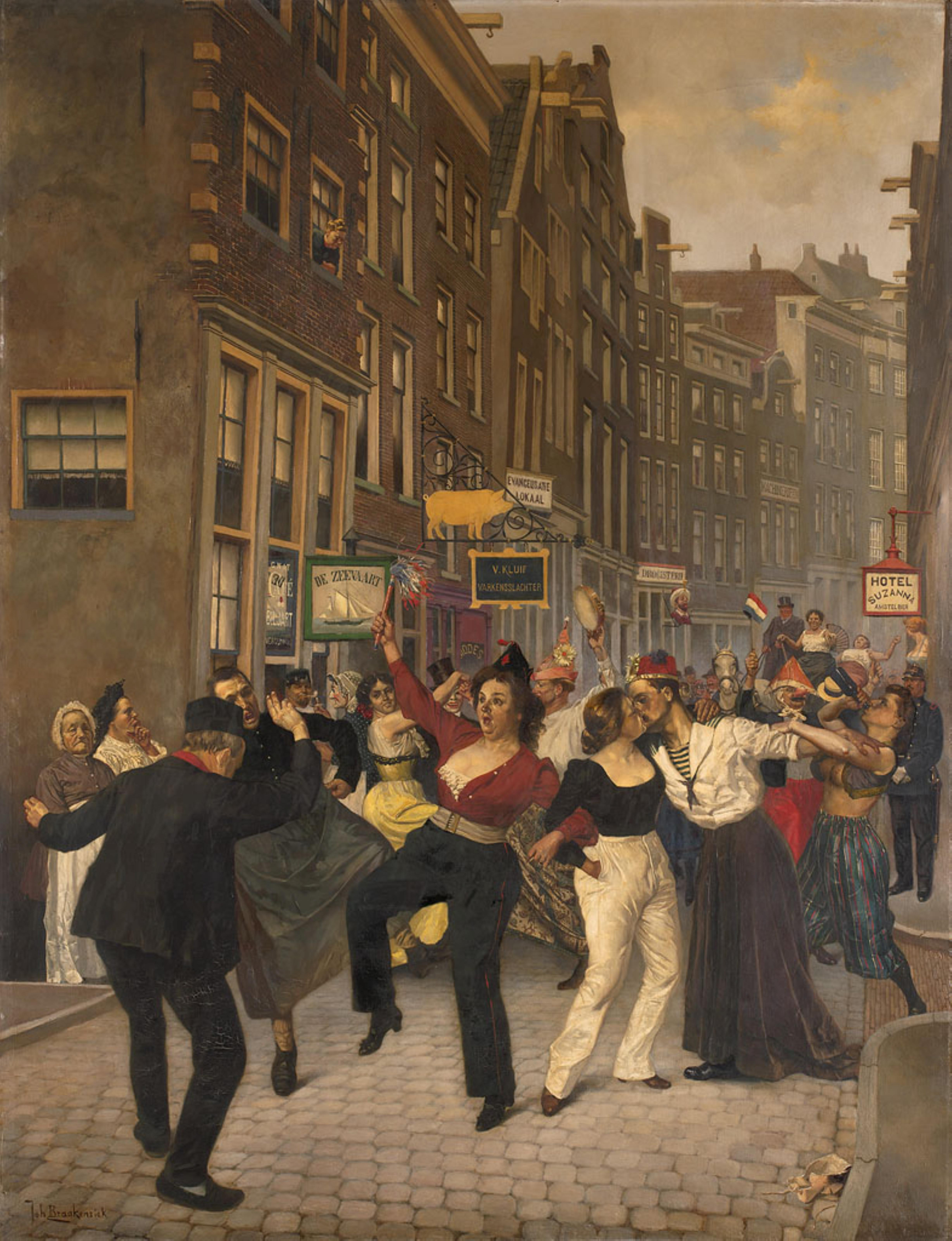
Johan Coenraad Braakensiek (1926): Hartjesdag, Amsterdam Museum.

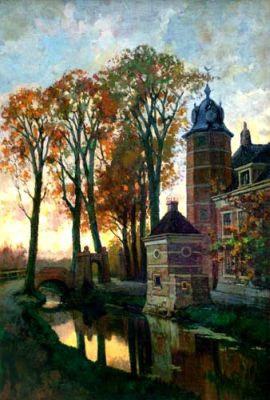
Nicolaas Bastert (1900): Huis ten Hoorn, Rijswijk, private collection.

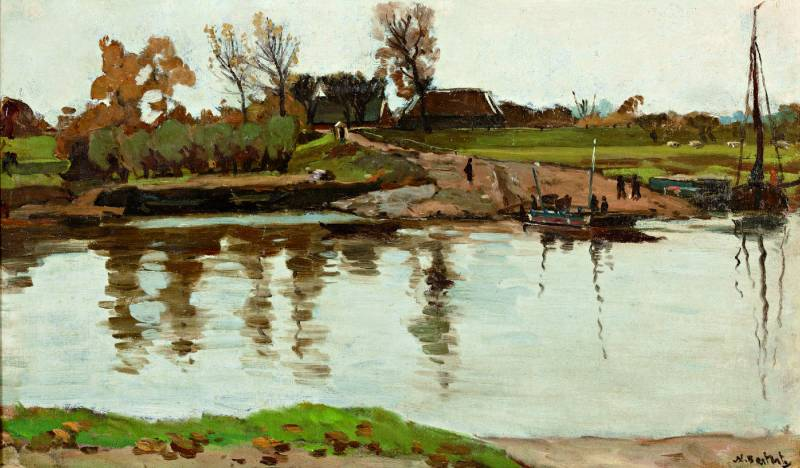
Nicolaas Bastert (1890): Veerpont aan de Vecht, private collection.

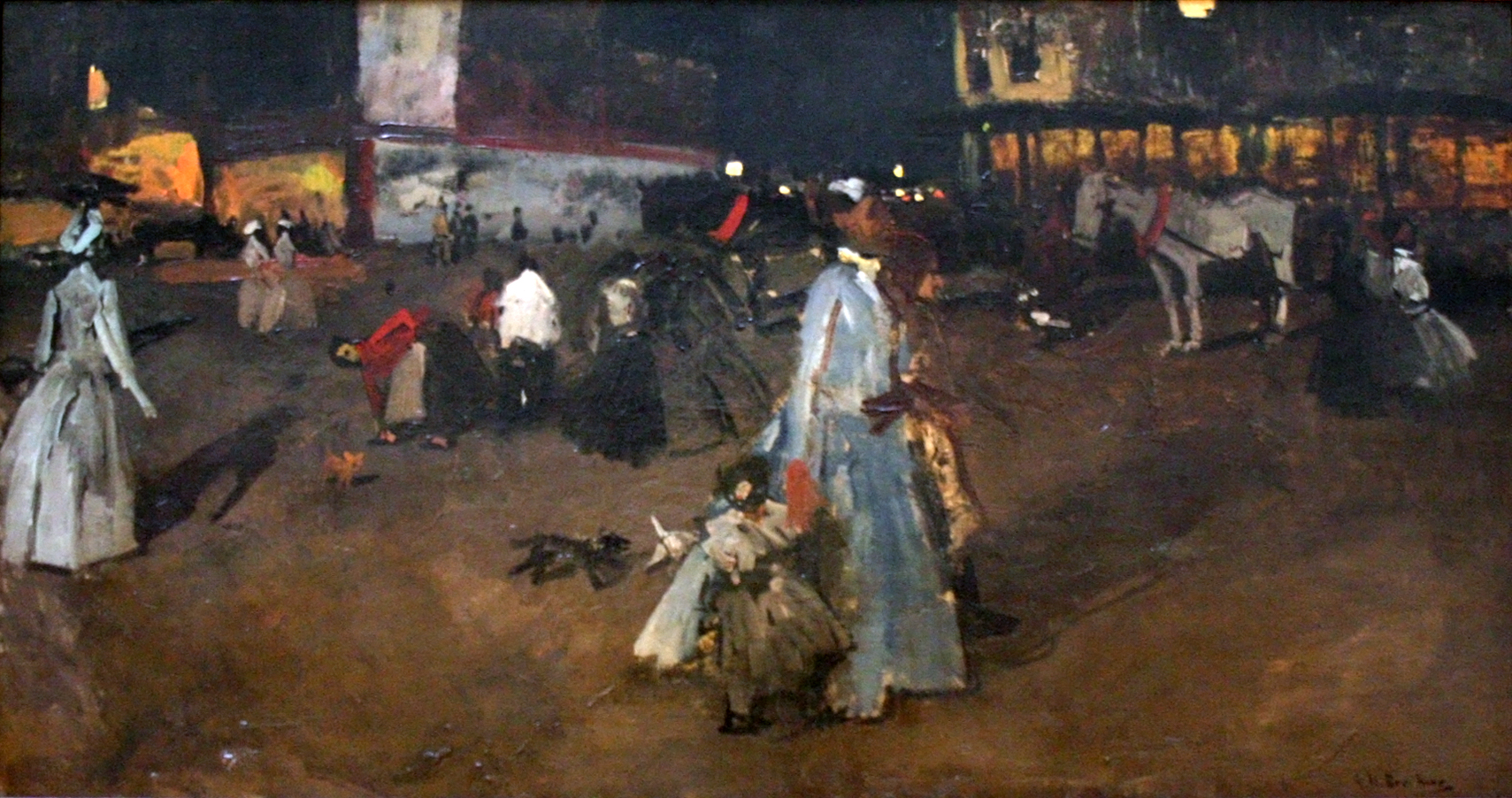
George Hendrik Breitner (1890): Avond op de Dam in Amsterdam, Royal Museum of fine Arts Antwerp.

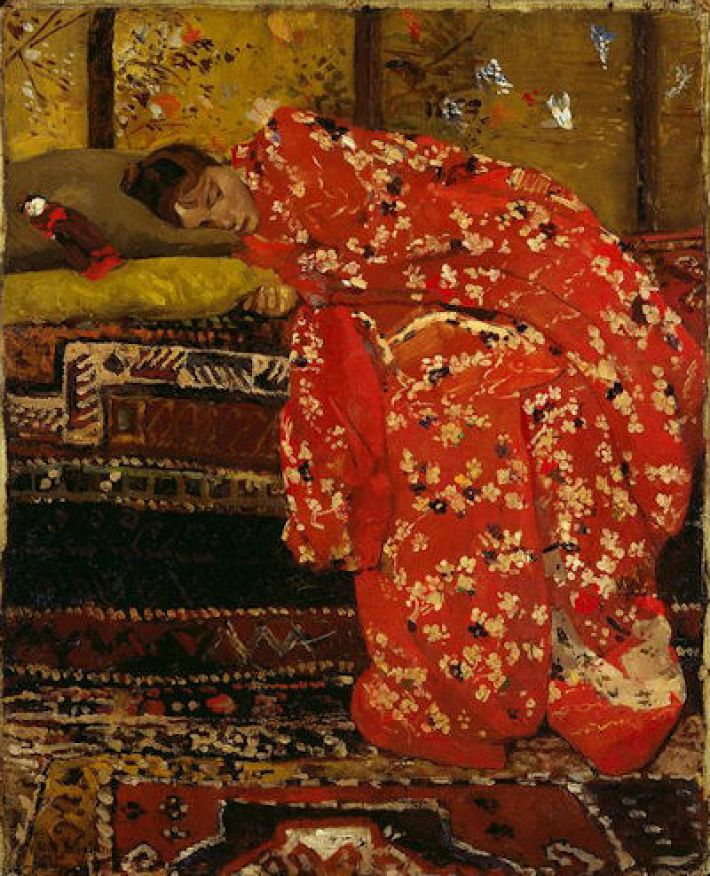
George Hendrik Breitner (1893/95): Girl in a Red Kimono - Geisha Kwak, private collection.

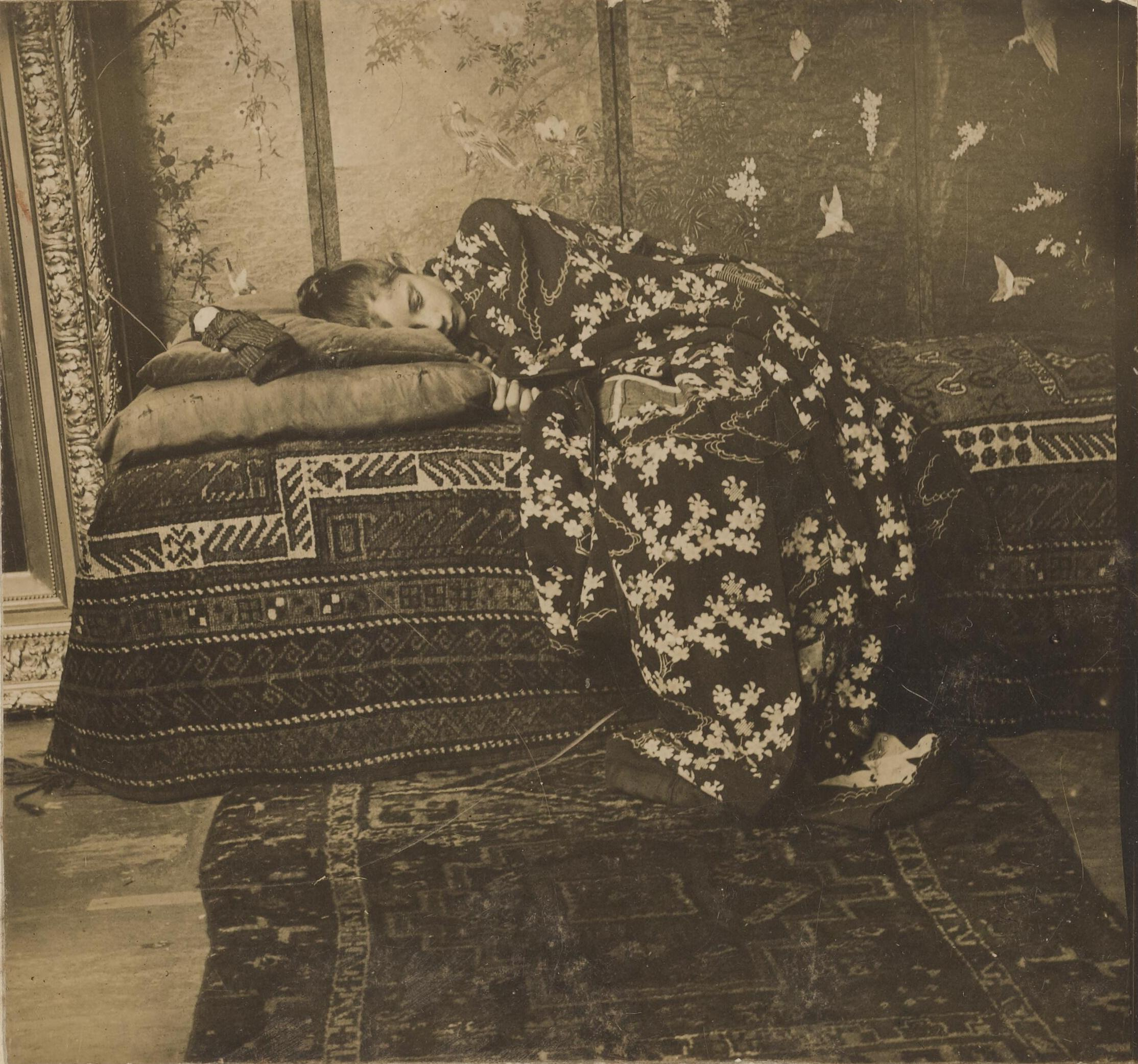
George Hendrik Breitner (1883/88): Cavalry, Gemeentemuseum Den Haag.

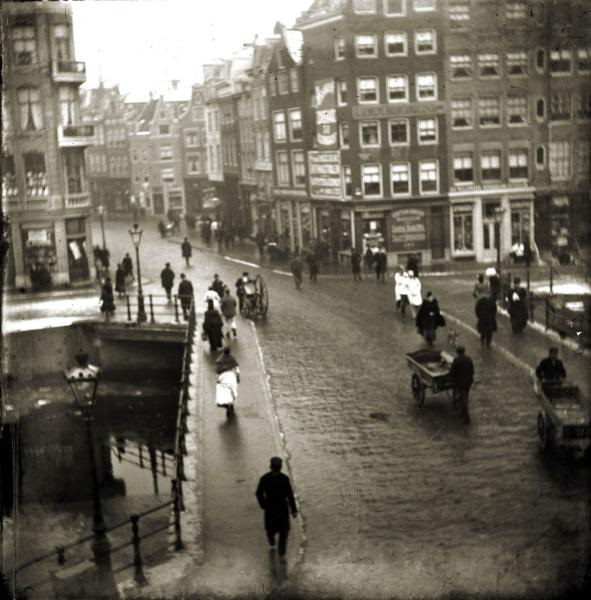
Georg Hendrik Breitner (1893): Singelbrug at Amsterdam, private collection.

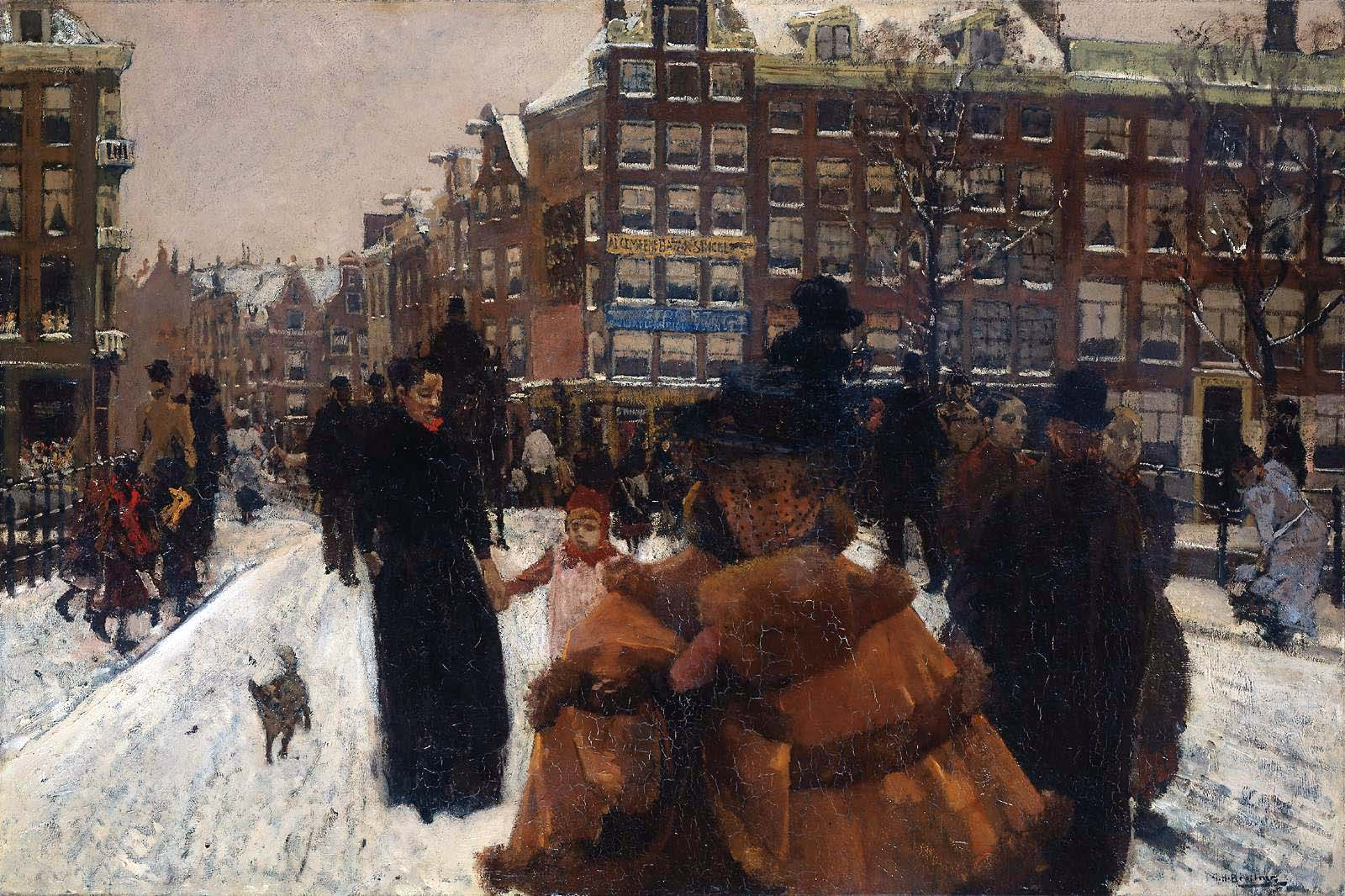
Georg Hendrik Breitner (1890): Singelbrug at the Paleisstraat, Amsterdam, private collection.

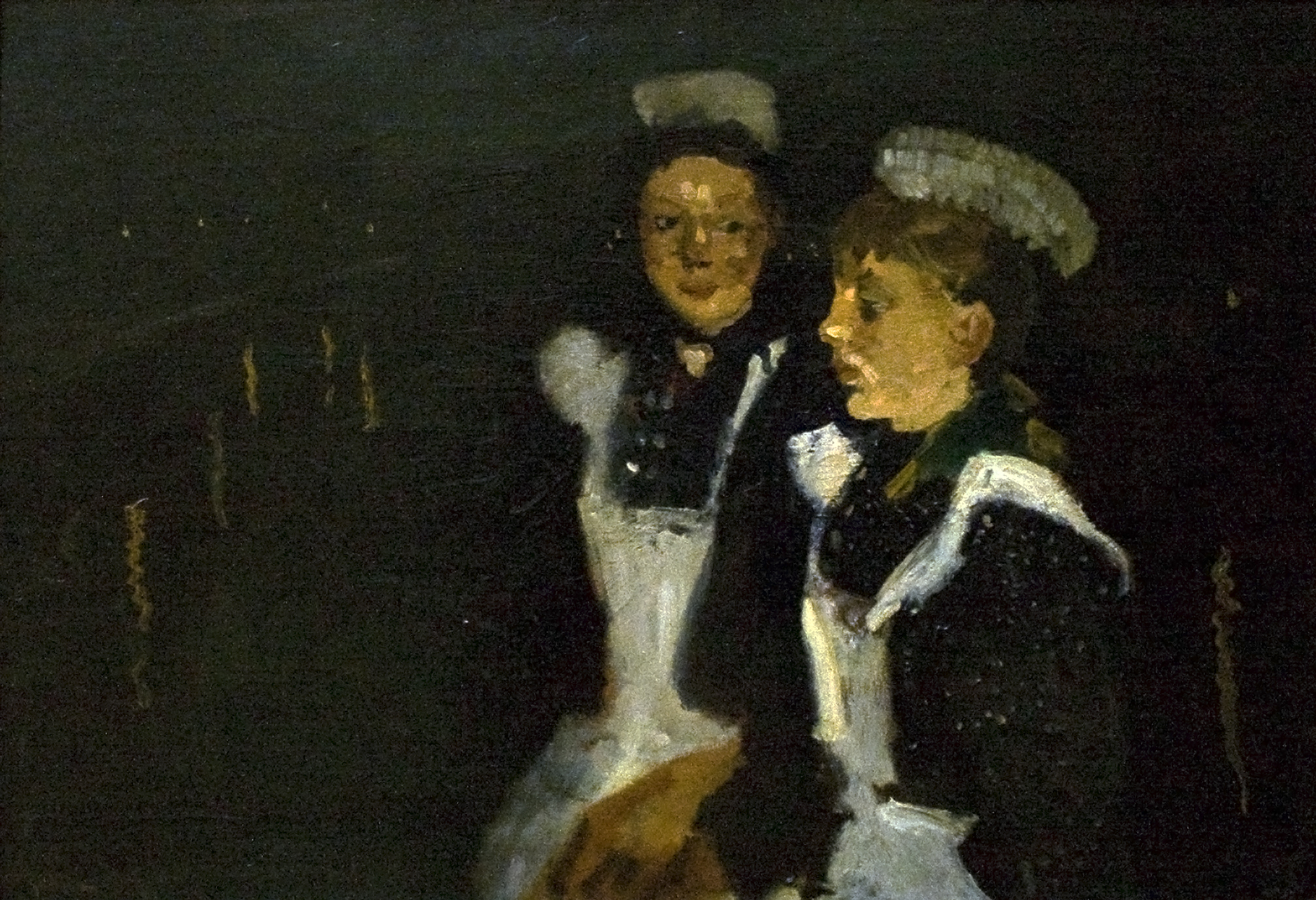
Georg Hendrik Breitner (1890): Two servants, Teylers Museum Haarlem.

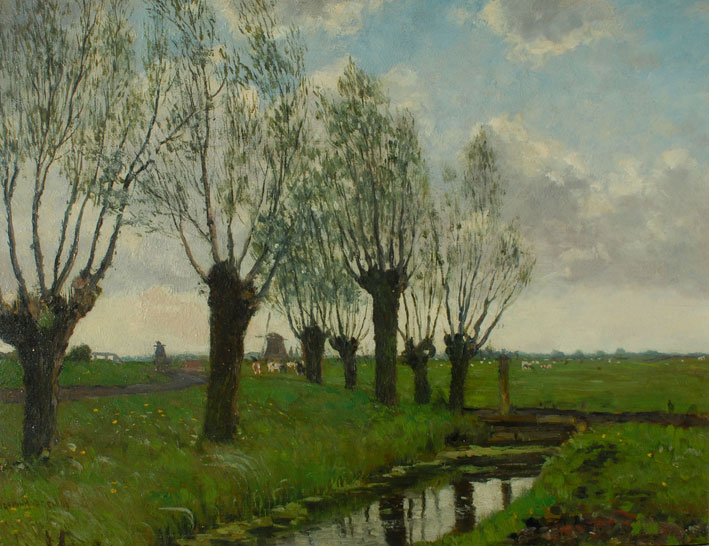
Dirk van Haaren (undated): Spring at a creek, private collection.

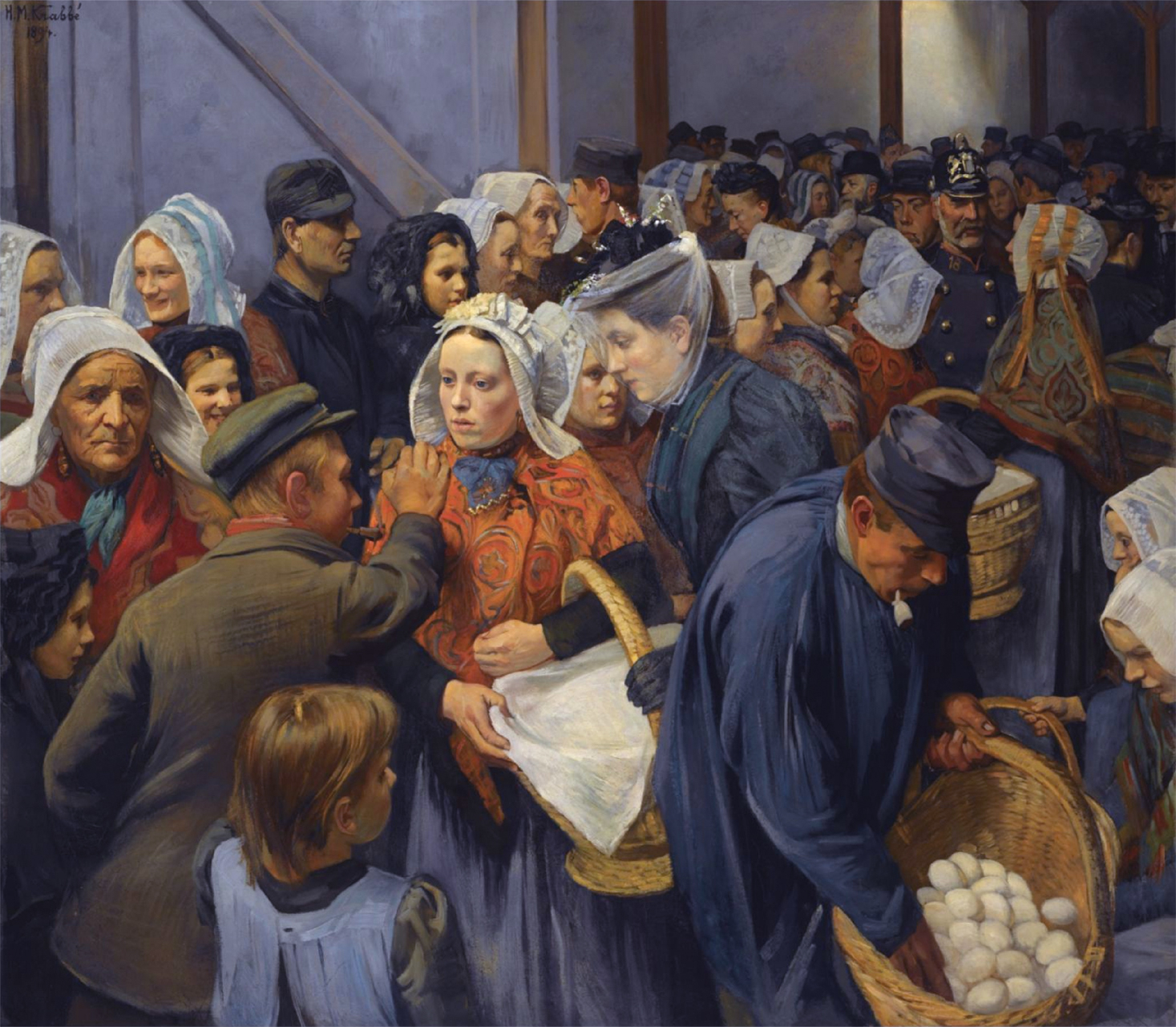
Heinrich Marten Krabbé (1894): Scene at the market of Brabant, private collection.

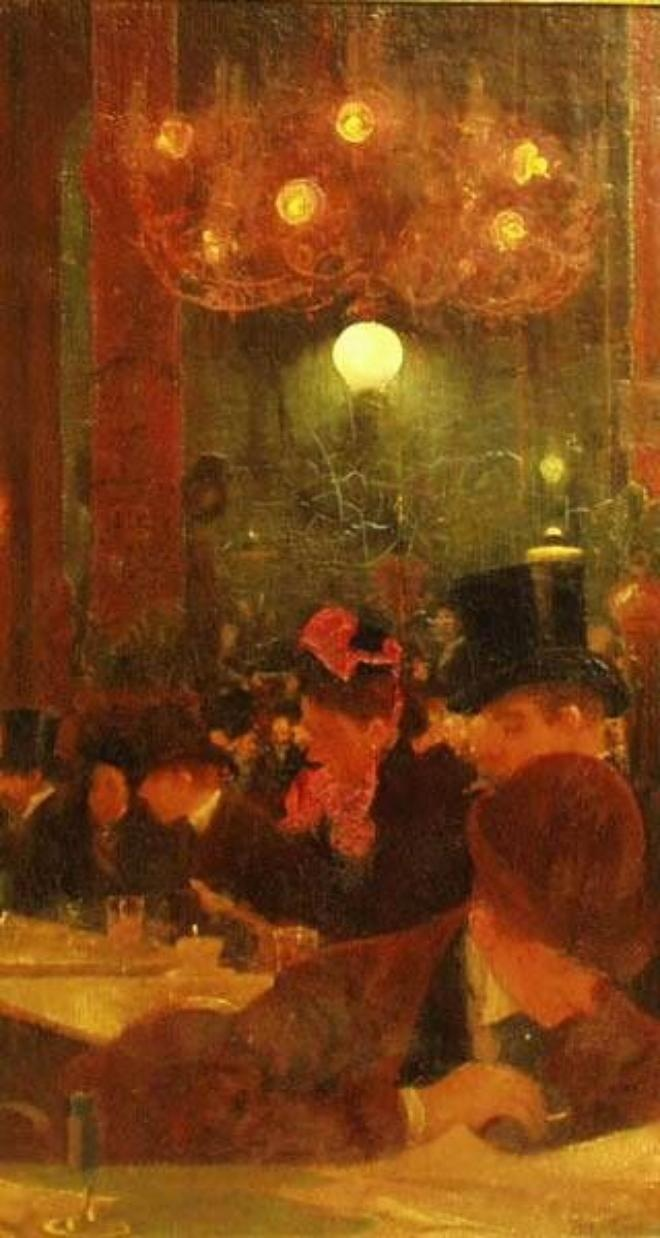
Jacobus van Looy (1890/95): Café, Franz-Hals-Museum Haarlem.

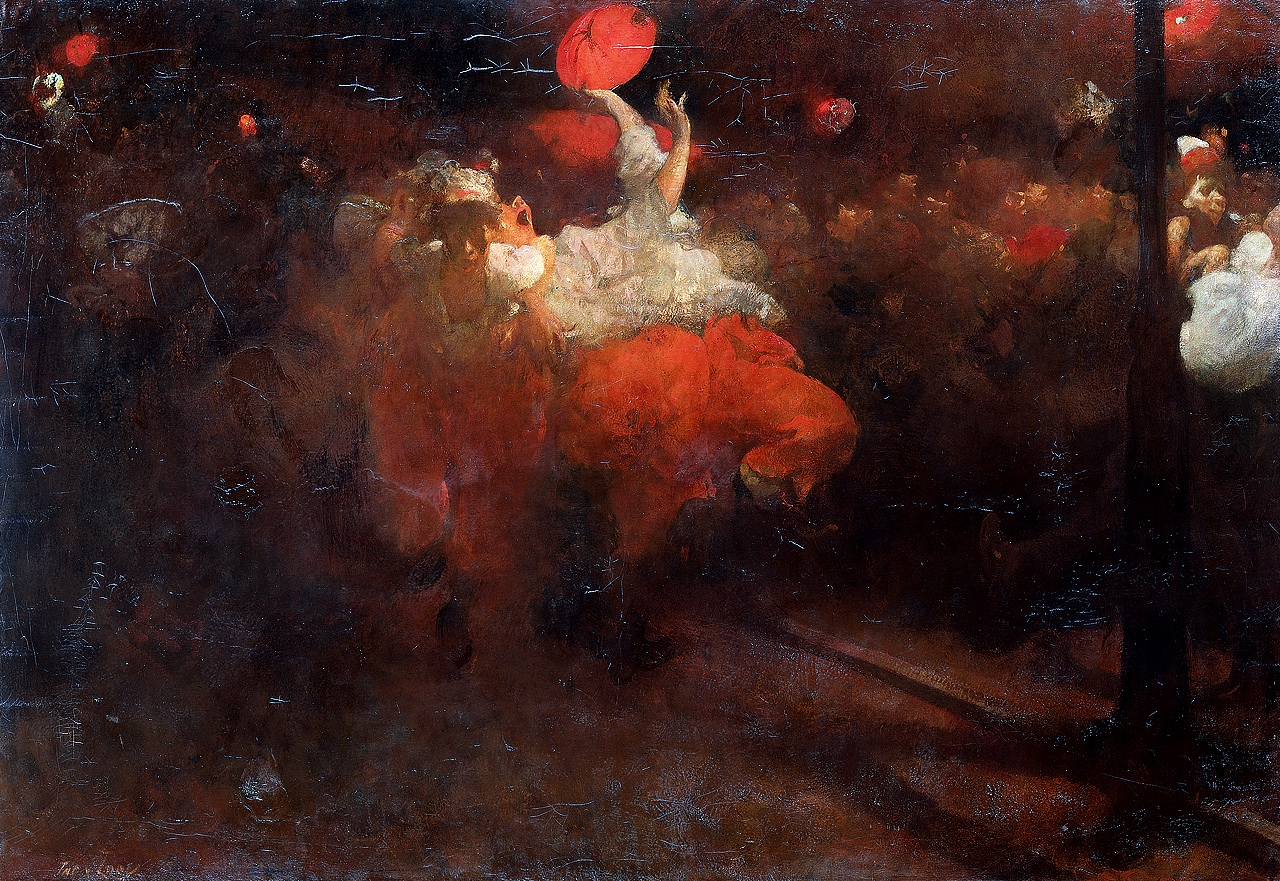
Jacobus van Looy (1890): Oranjefest, private collection.

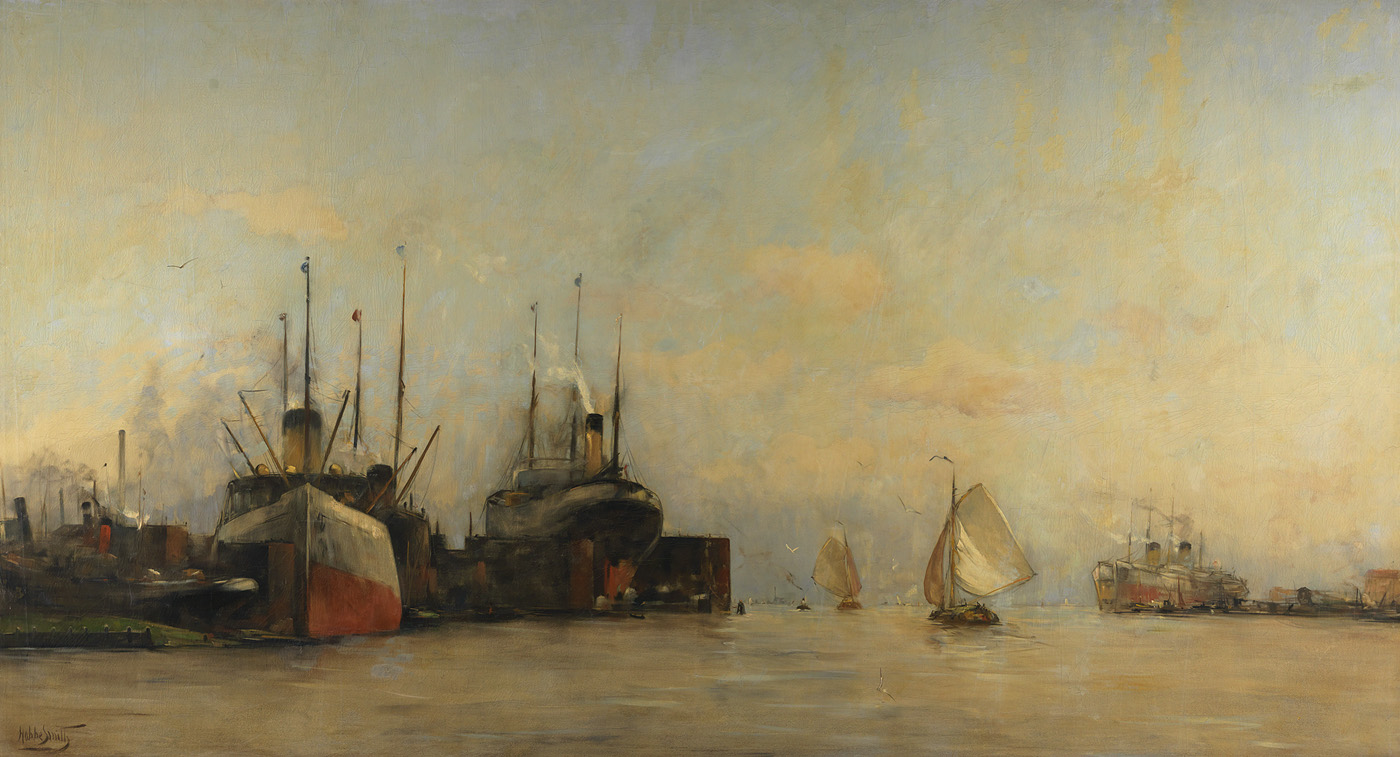
Hobbe Smith (1900): Gezicht op het IJ naar het oosten, met de dokken van de Amsterdamsche Droogdok Maatschappij en de kop van het IJ-eiland-Havengezicht van Amsterdam, Amsterdam Museum.

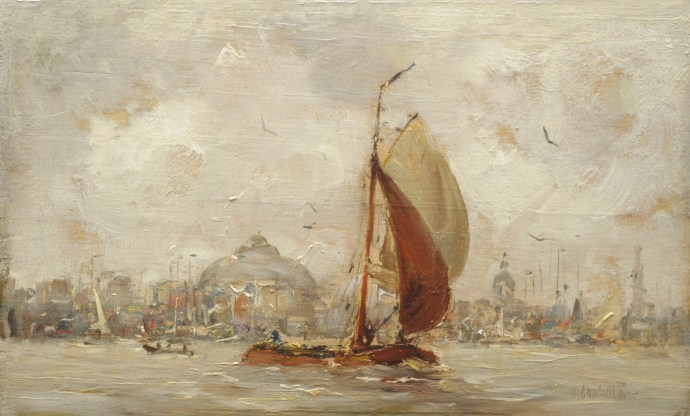
Hobbe Smith (1900): Tjalk under sail leaving the port of Amsterdam, private collection.

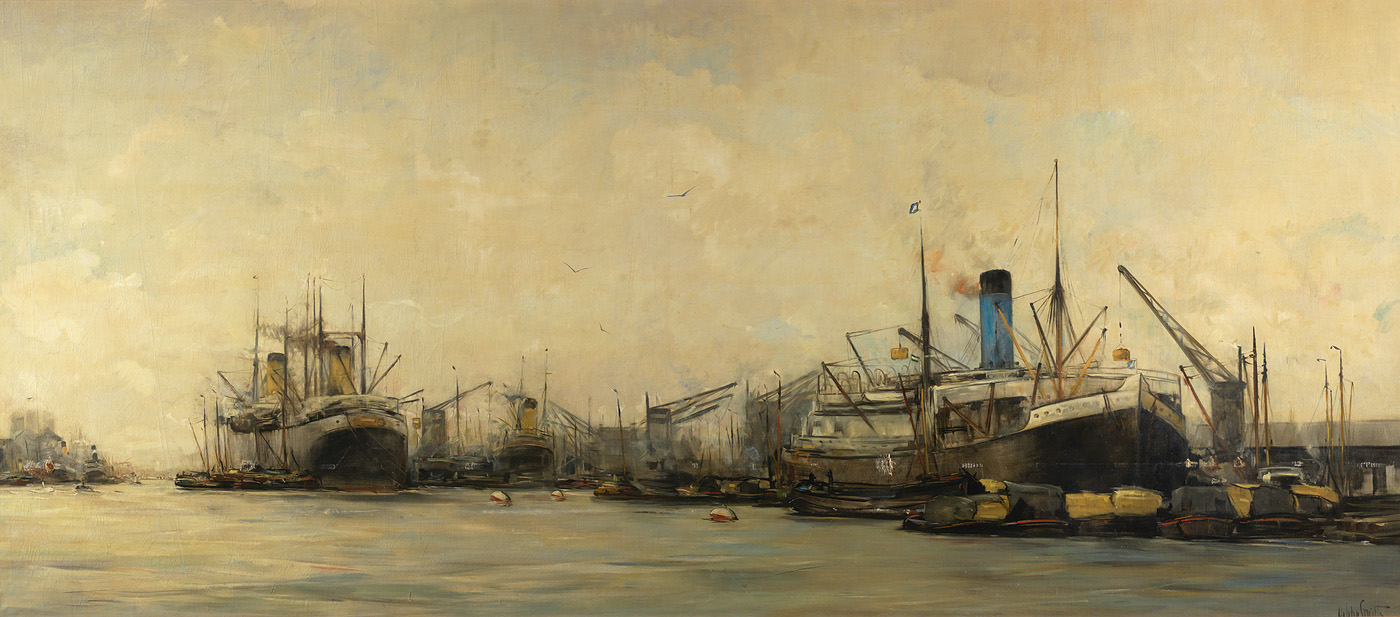
Hobbe Smith (1913): Gezicht op de IJhaven en de Javakade naar het westen, met een "blauwpijper" van de Nederlandsche Stoomvaart Maatschappij Oceaan-Havengezicht het IJ ten zuiden v-d Handelskade, Amsterdam Museum.

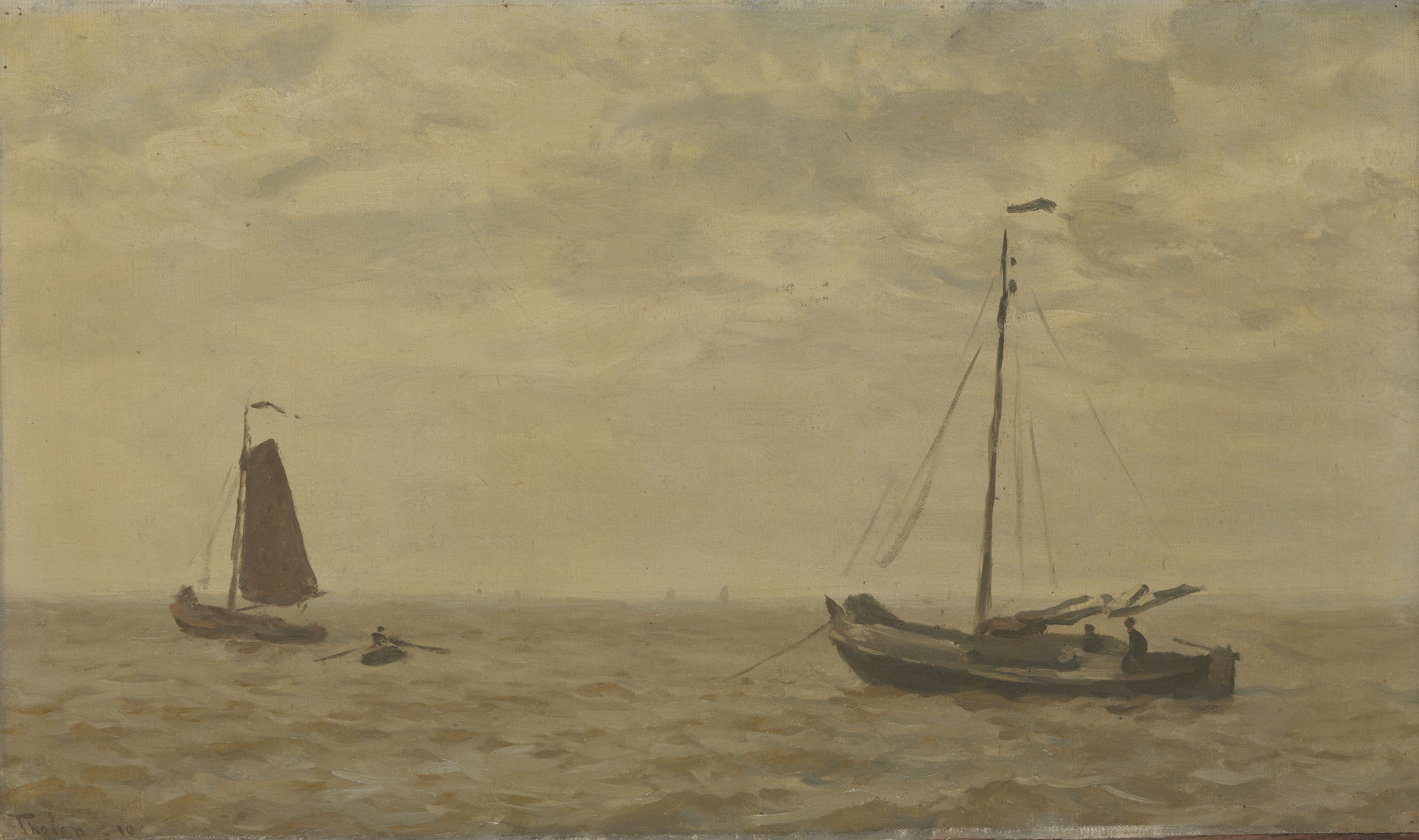
Willem Bastiaan Tholen (1910): Zeegezicht met vissersschuiten, Rijksmuseum Amsterdam.

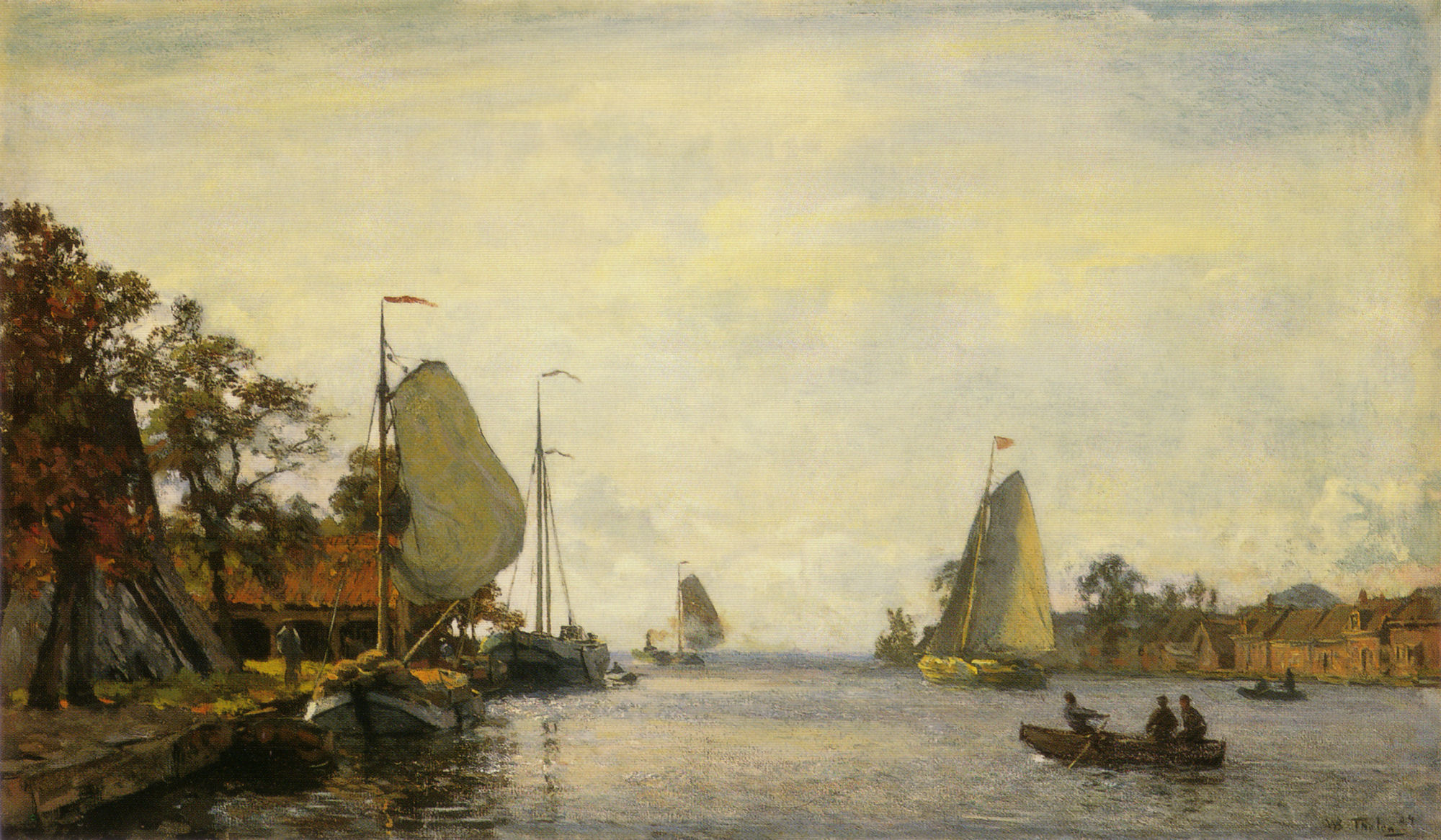
Willem Bastiaan Tholen (1904): Zomers riviergezicht met zeilschepen, private collection.

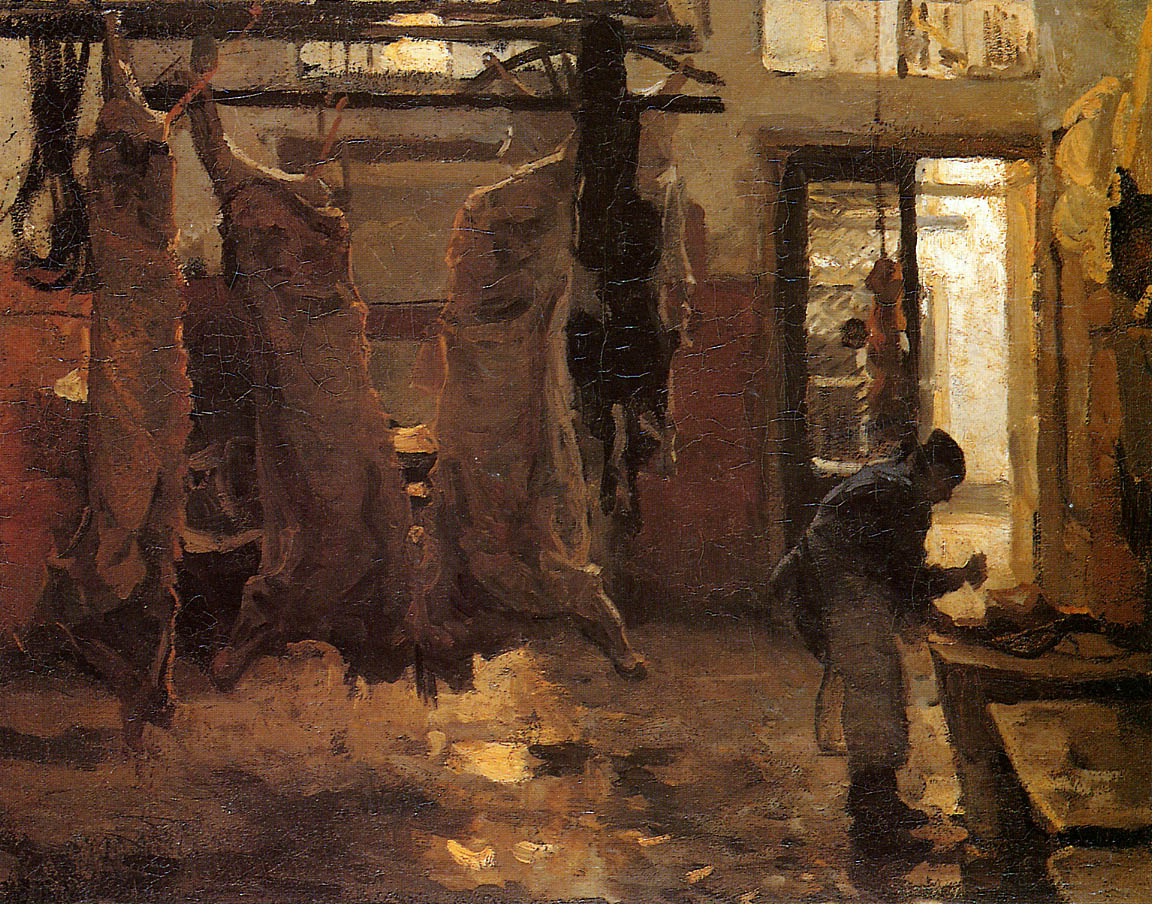
Willem Bastiaan Tholen (before 1931): Sun at the slaughterhouse, Rijksmuseum Amsterdam.

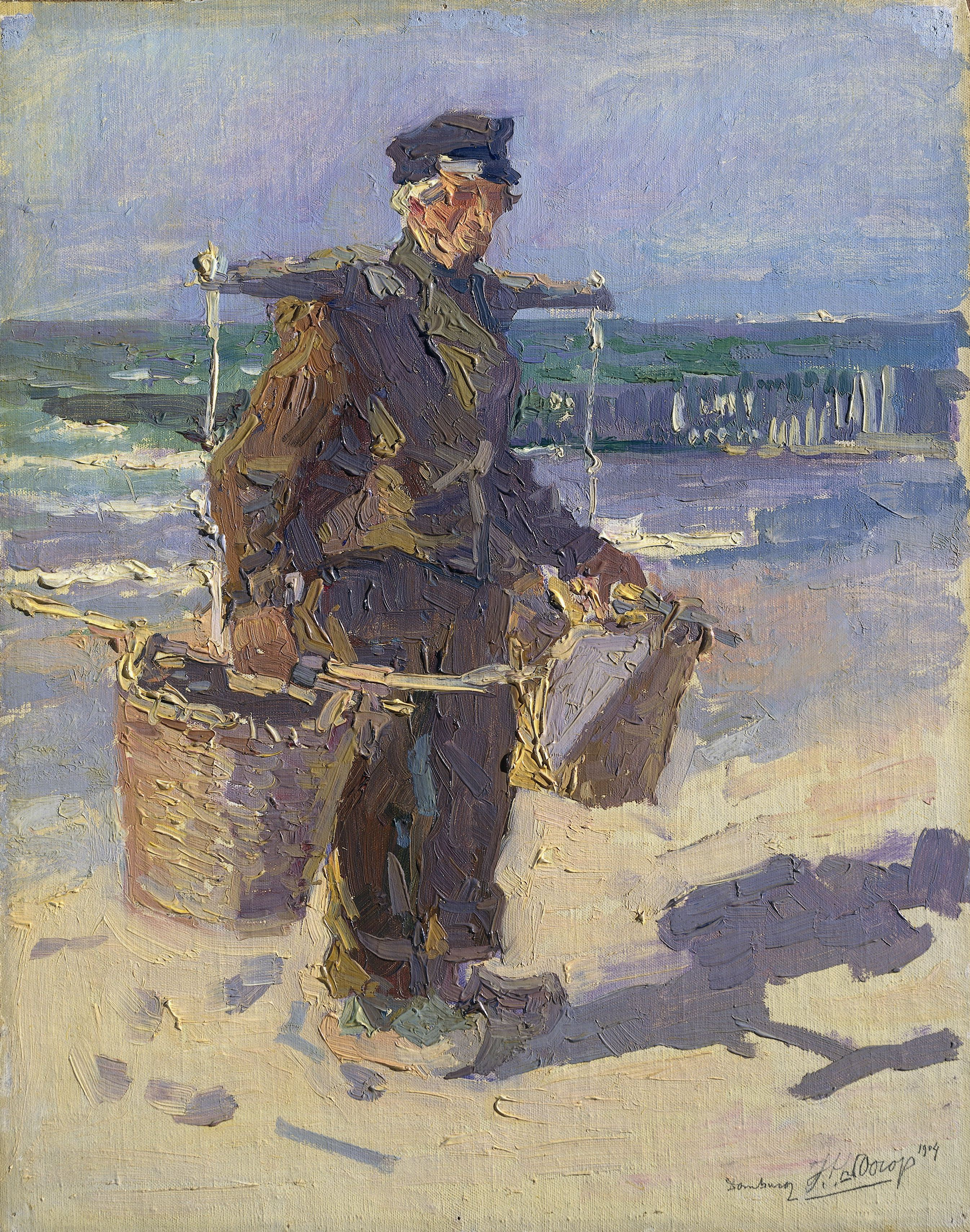
Jan Toorop (1904): De schelpenvisser, Rijksmuseum Amsterdam.

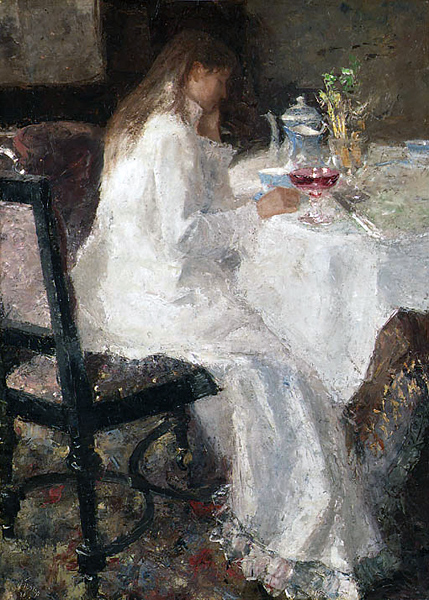
Jan Toorop (1886): Lady in white (his wife Annie Hall), private collection.

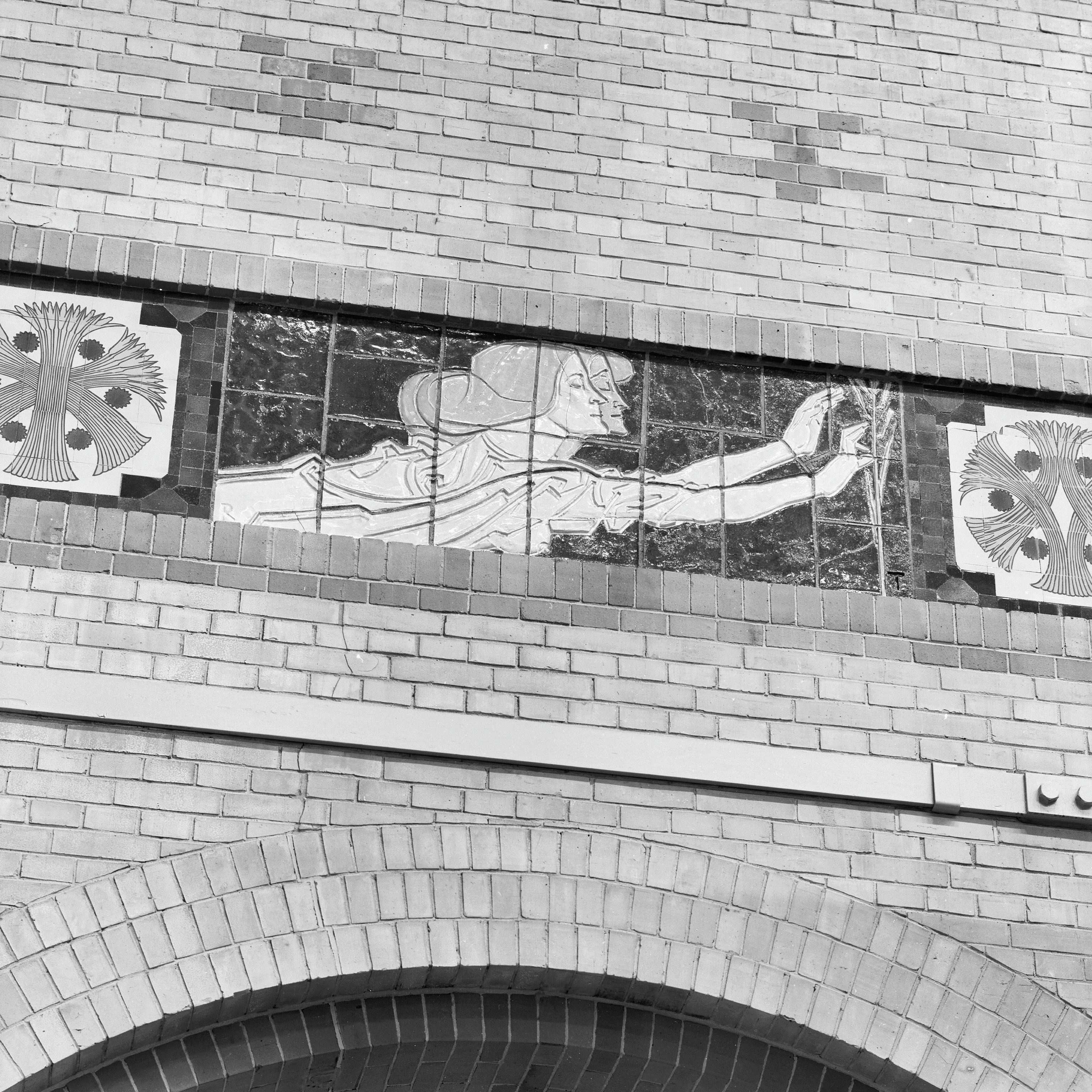
Jan Toorop: Graanbeurs, sectieltableaux Toorop - Amsterdam.

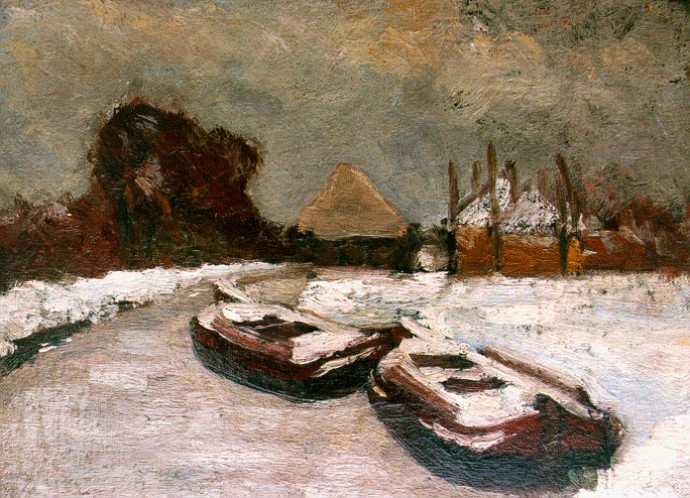
Floris Hendrik Verster (undated): Winter face of a village on the waterfront, private collection.

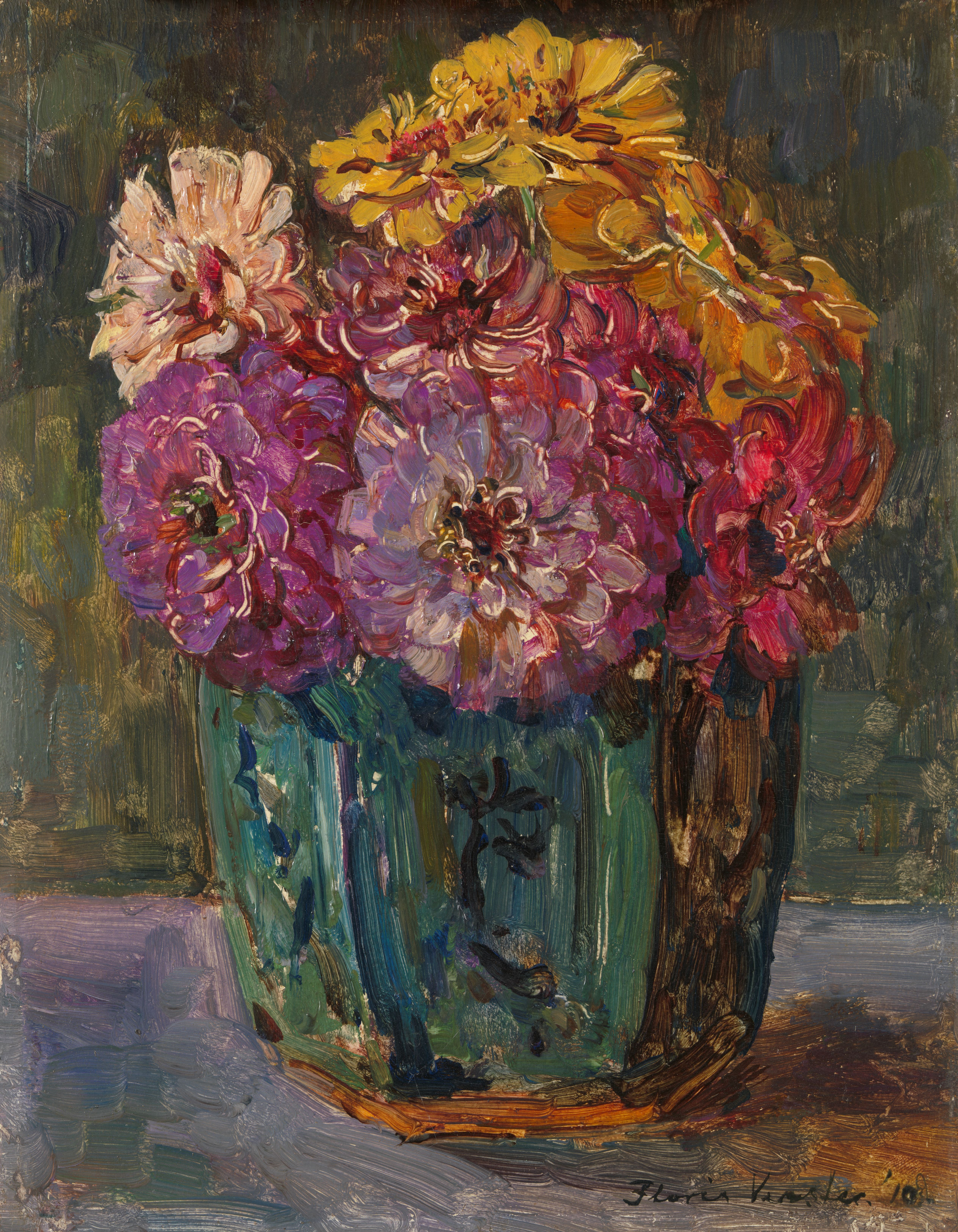
Floris Hendrik Verster (1910): Stilleven met zinnia's in een gemberpot, Rijksmuseum Amsterdam.

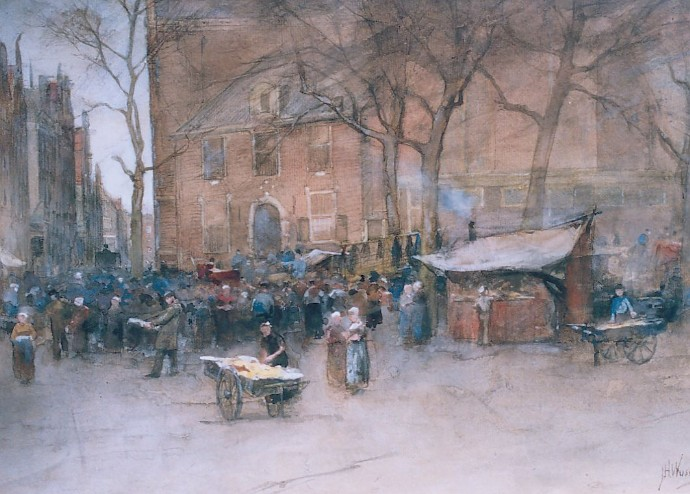
Jan Hillebrand Wijsmuller (1900): Market at the Noorderkerk, Amsterdam, private collection.

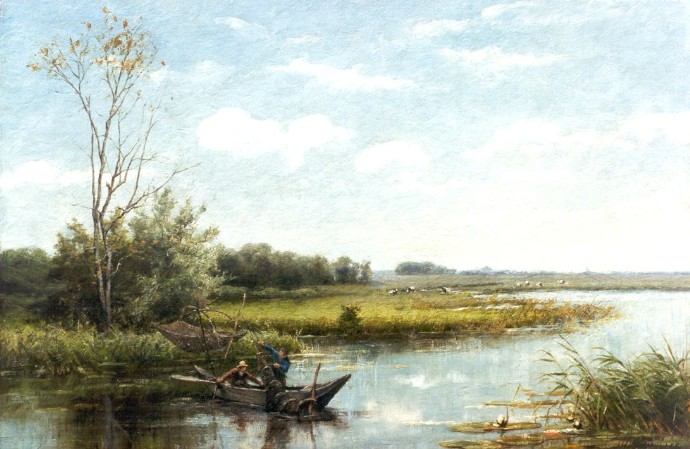
Jan Hillebrand Wijsmuller (1900): Deploying the traps, private collection.

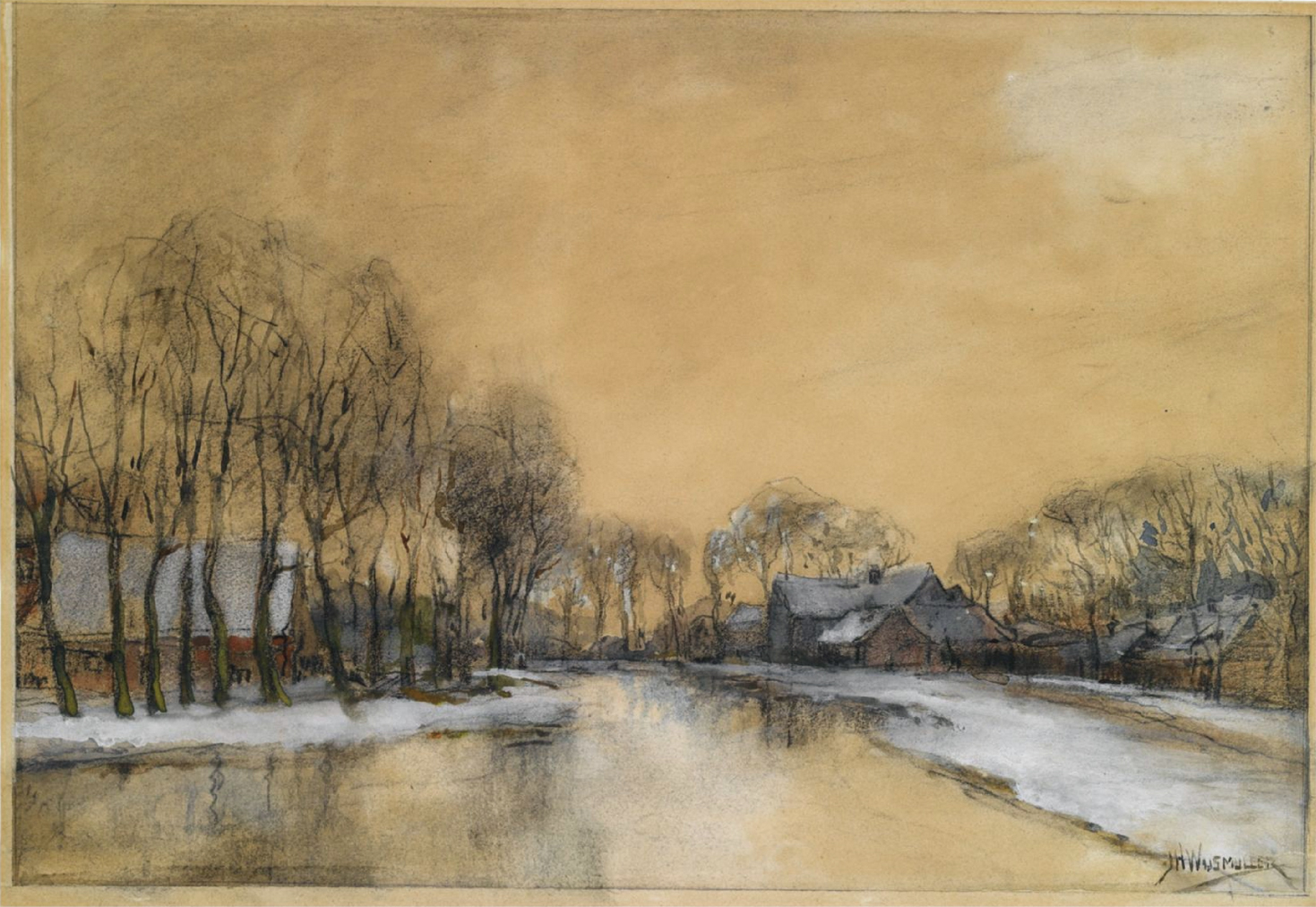
Jan Hillebrand Wijsmuller (undated): Winter landscape with houses along a canal, private collection.

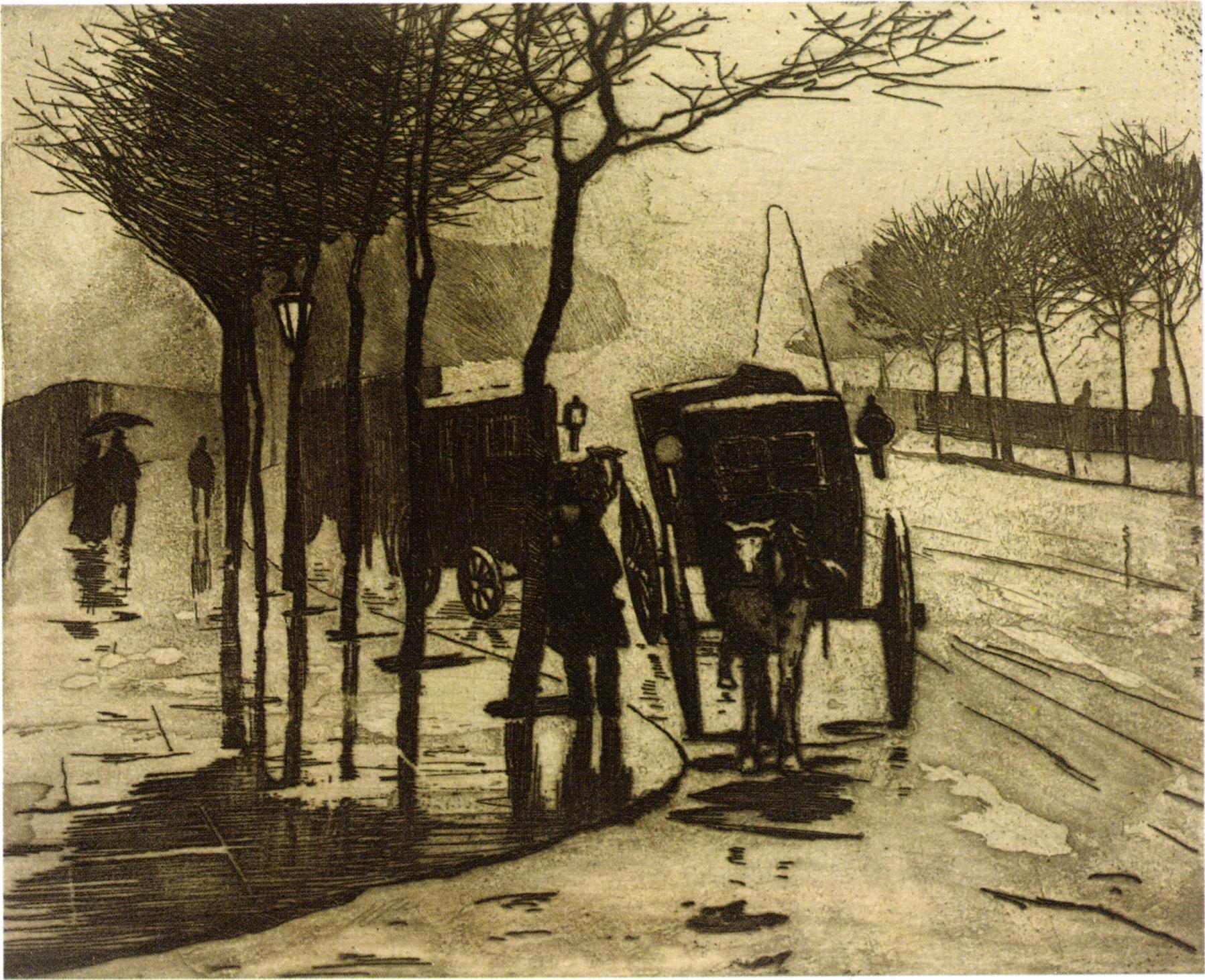
Willem Witsen (1908): Waiting Cabs, London, Museum Boijmans Beuningen Rotterdam.

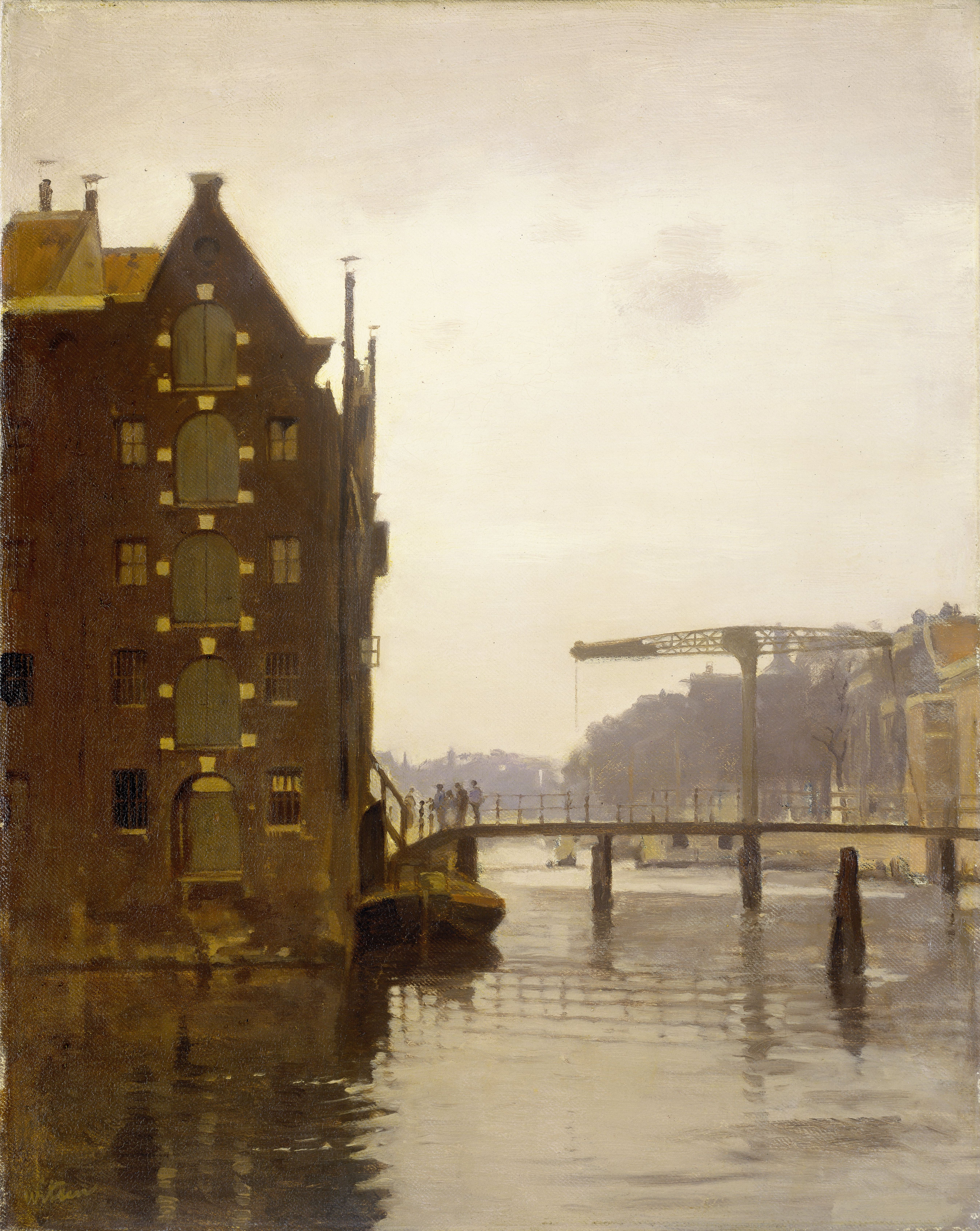
Willem Witsen (undated): Pakhuizen aan een Amsterdamse gracht op Uilenburg, private collection.

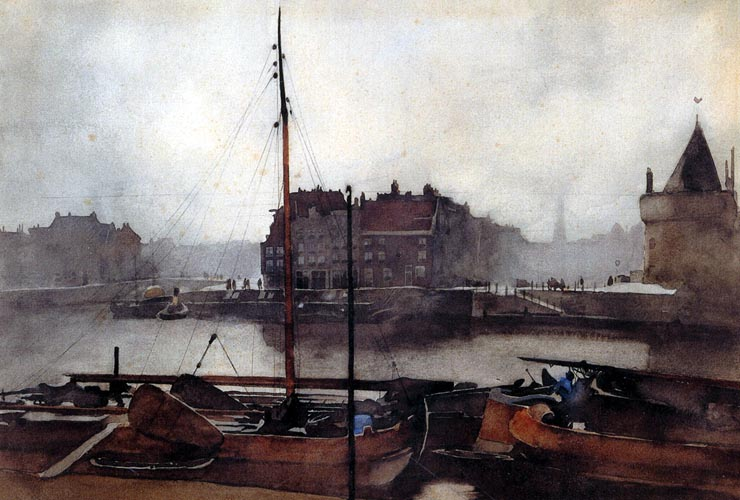
Willem Witsen (1891): Prins Hendrikkade te Amsterdam.

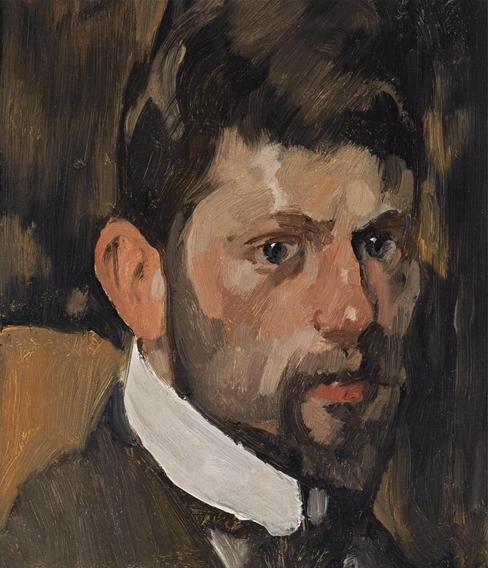
Willem Witsen (1900): Portrait von Felicien Bobeldijk, private collection.

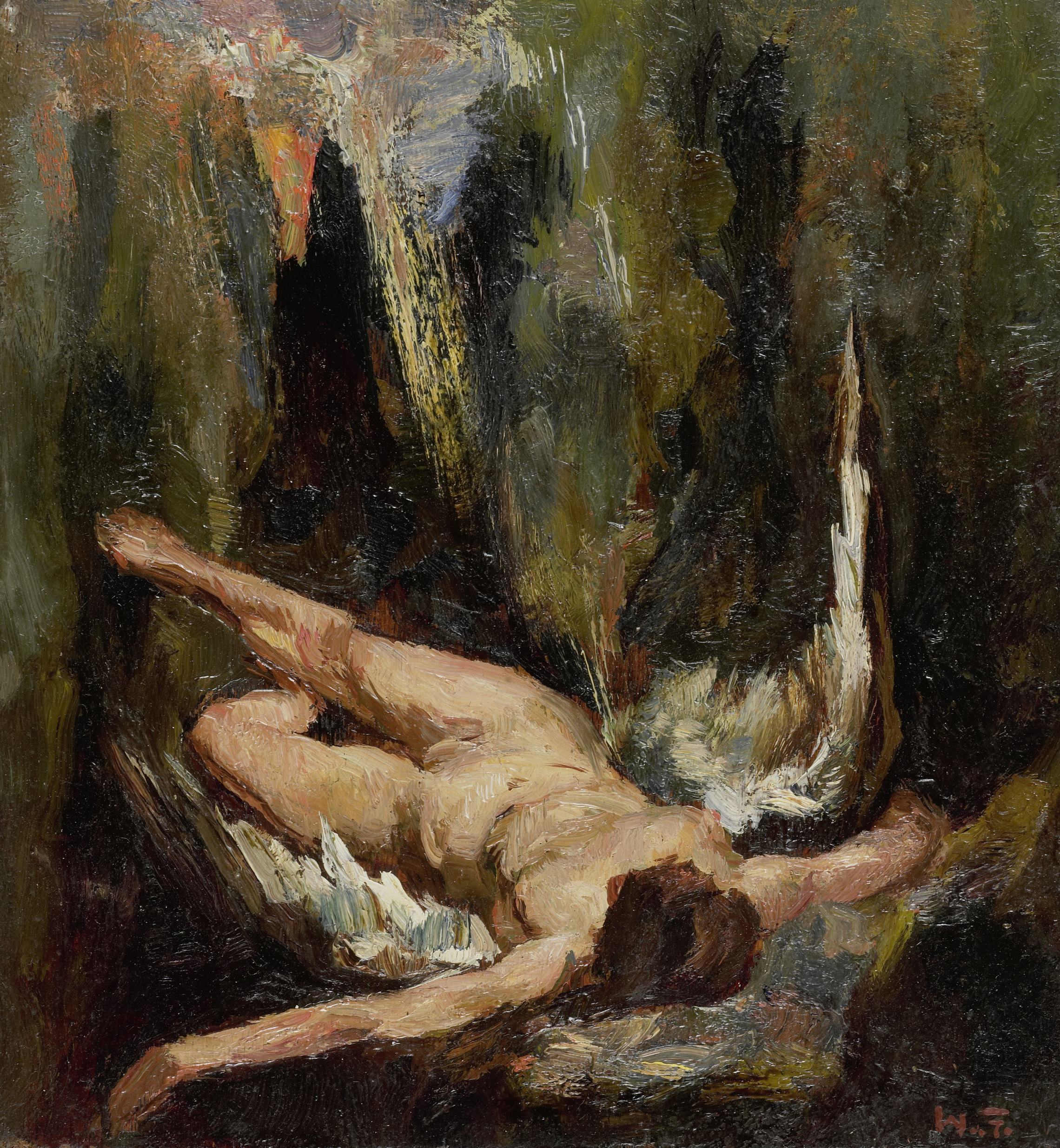
Willem de Zwart (1885/1931): The fallen Angel, Rijksmuseum.

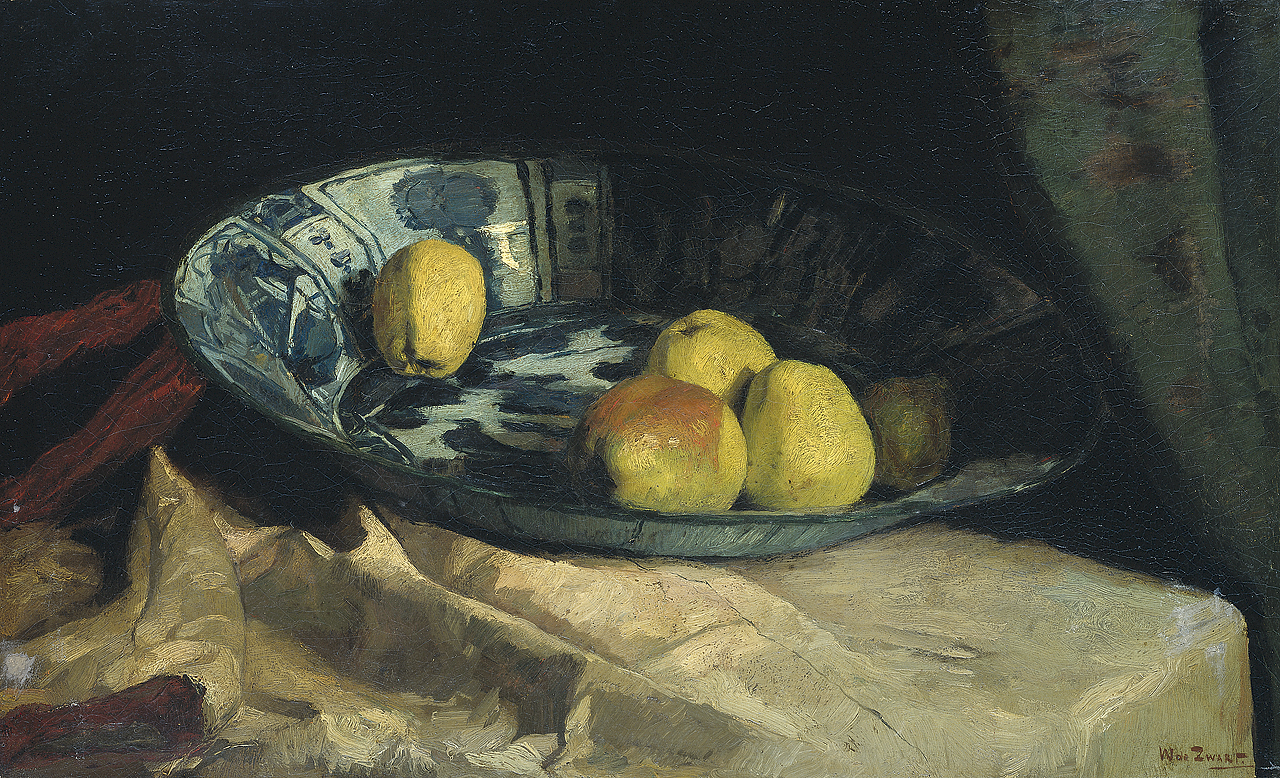
Willem de Zwart (1880/90): Still life with apples on tray in Delft Blue, Rijksmuseum Amsterdam.

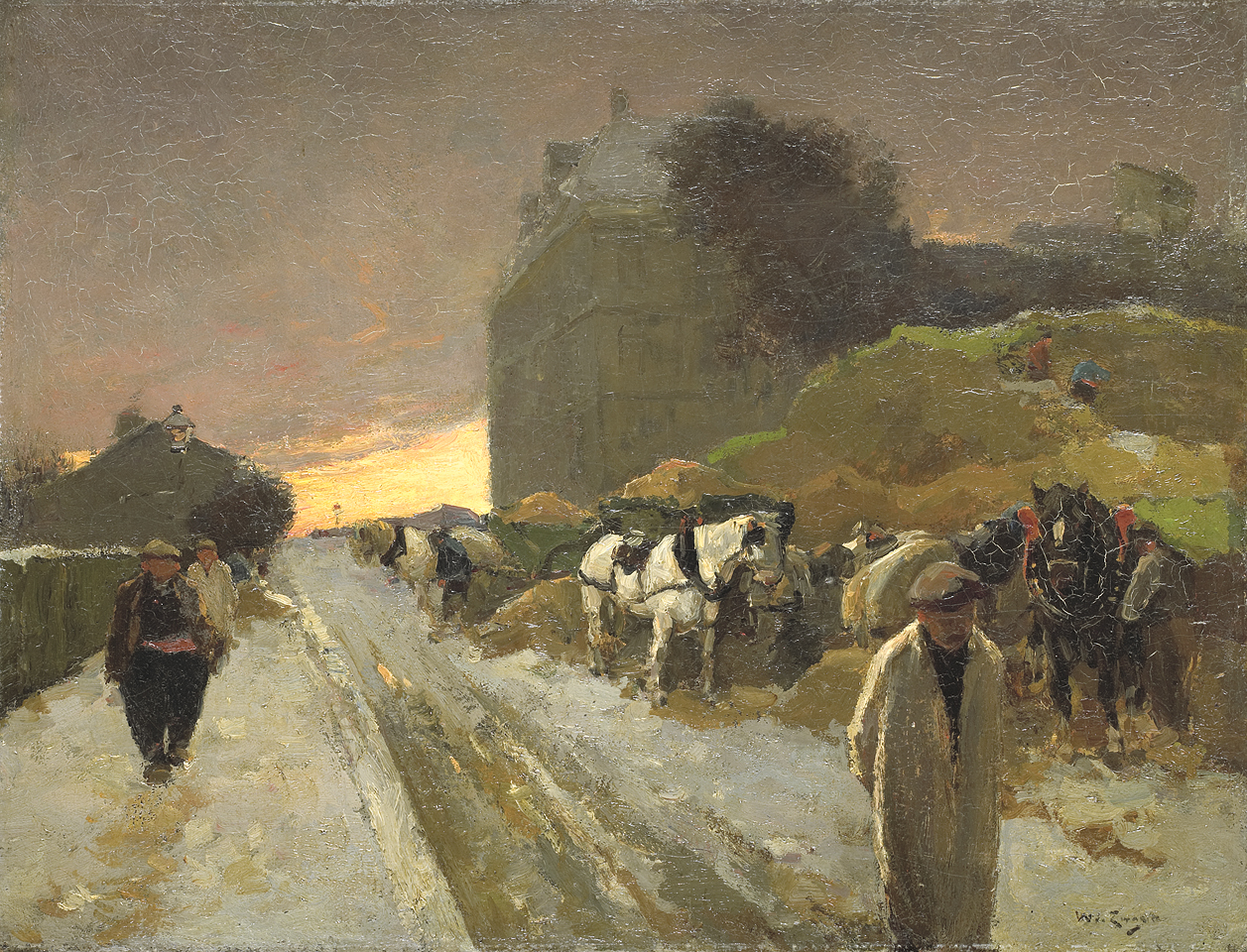
Willem de Zwart (1890): Street at Montmartre in the Winter, Rijksmuseum Amsterdam.

== Amsterdamse Joffers ==
- Lizzy Ansingh (1875–1959)
- Jo Bauer-Stumpff (1873–1951)
- Ans van den Berg (1873–1942)
- Nelly Bodenheim (1874–1951)
- Marie van Regteren Altena (1868–1958)
- Jacoba Johanna (Coba) Ritsema (1876–1961)
- Suze Bisschop-Robertson (1855–1922)
- Thérèse Schwartze (1851–1918)
- Jacoba Surie (1879–1970)
- Betsy Westendorp-Osieck (1880–1968)

The following female artist had contact to the Amsterdamse Joffers:

- Elsa van Doesenburg (1875–1957)
- Josepha Johanna Julia Marie Tepe (1884–1962)

== Gallery of Amsterdamse Joffers ==
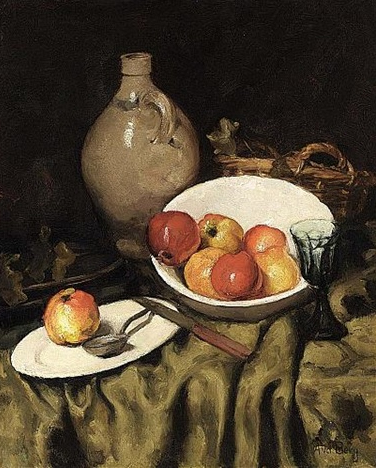
Ans van den Berg Still life with apples

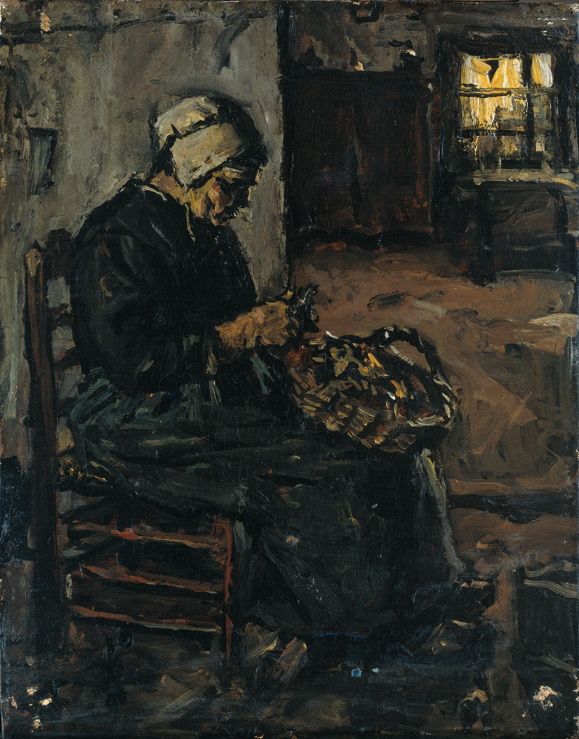
Suze Bisschop-Robertson (1922): Potatoes, peeled by a farmer's wife, Rijksmuseum Amsterdam.

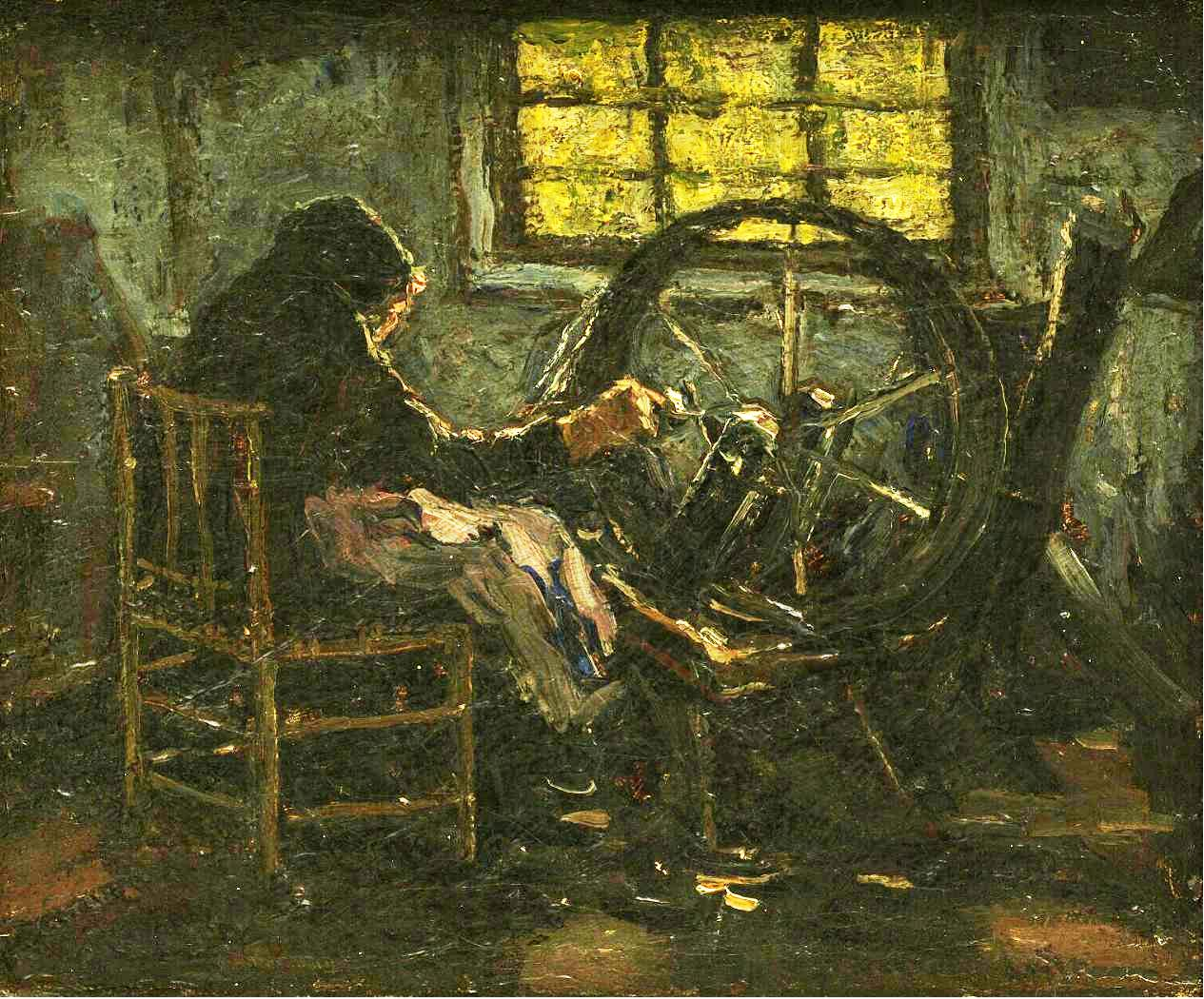
Suze Bisschop-Robertson (1900): Woman spinning, Gemeentemuseum Helmond.

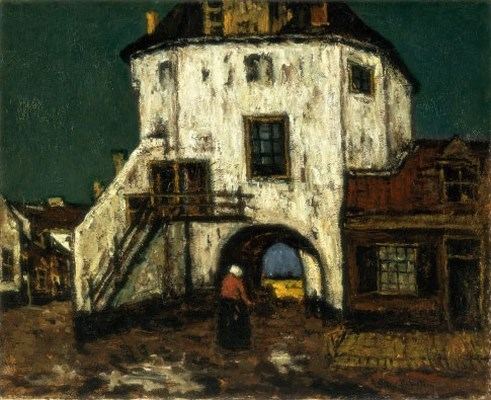
Suze Bisschop-Robertson (before 1922): De Vispoort van Harderwijk, private collection.

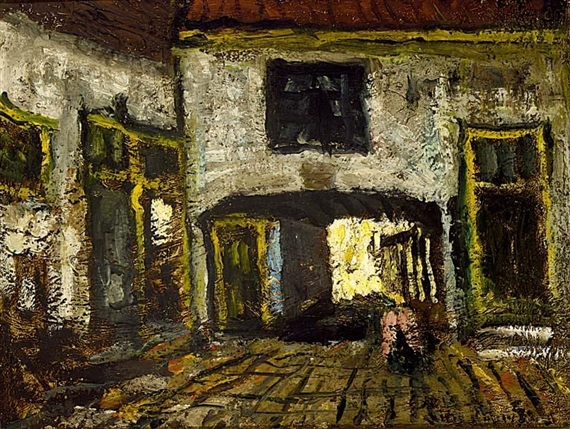
Suze Bisschop-Robertson (before 1922): Courtyard together with a Work, private collection.

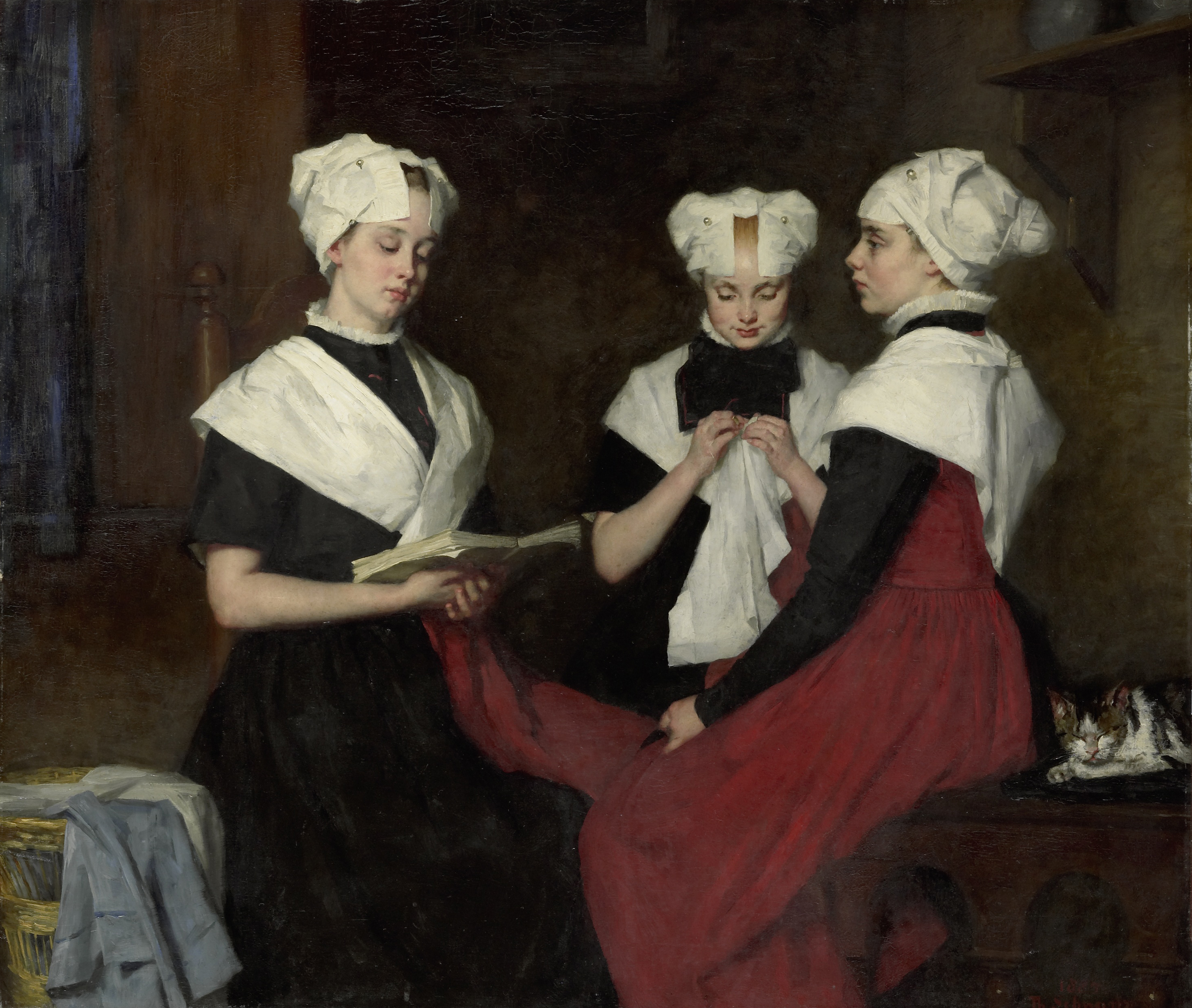
Thérèse Schwartze (1885): Drie meisjes uit het Amsterdamse Burgerweeshuis.

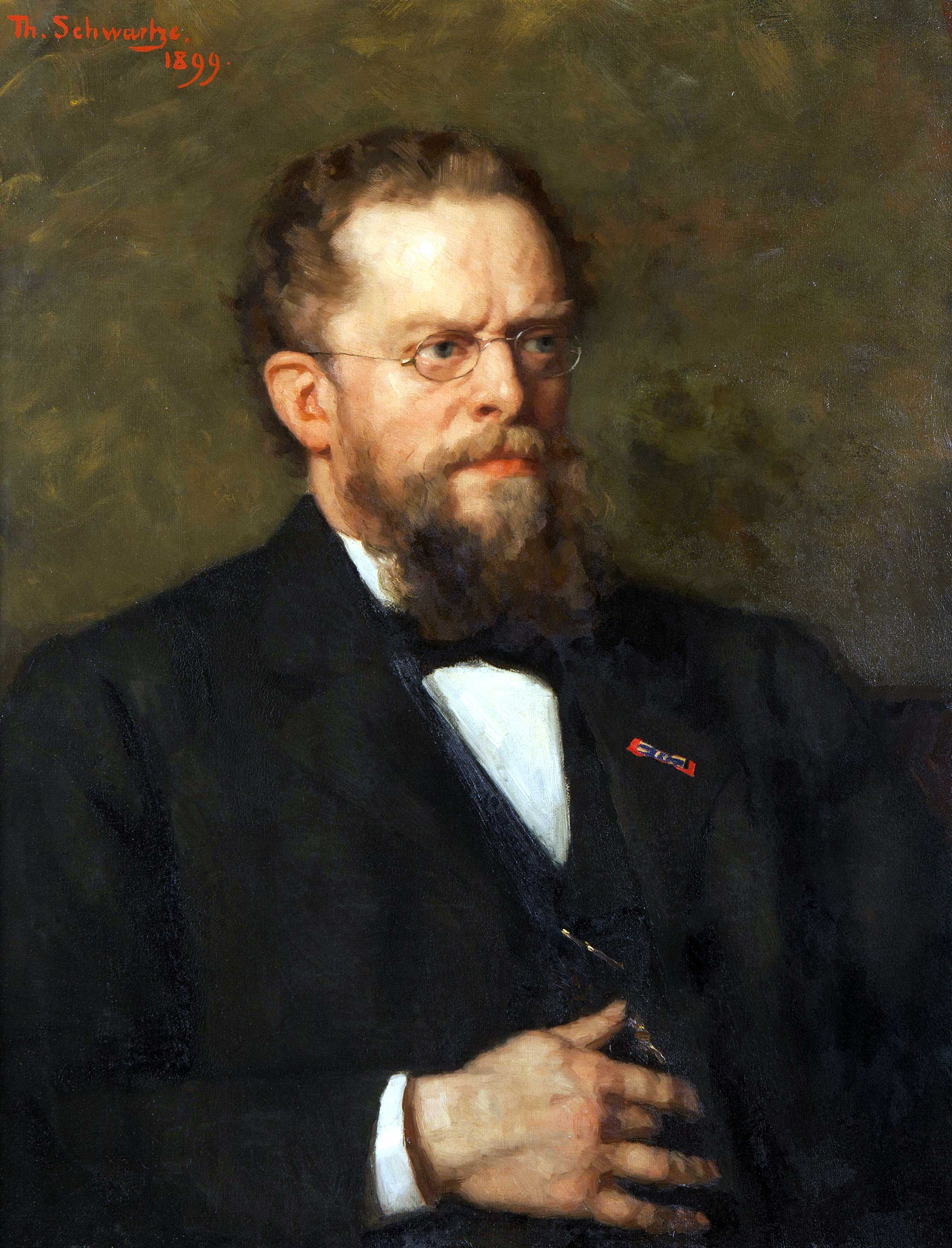
Thérèse Schwartze (1899): Prof. Franchimont.

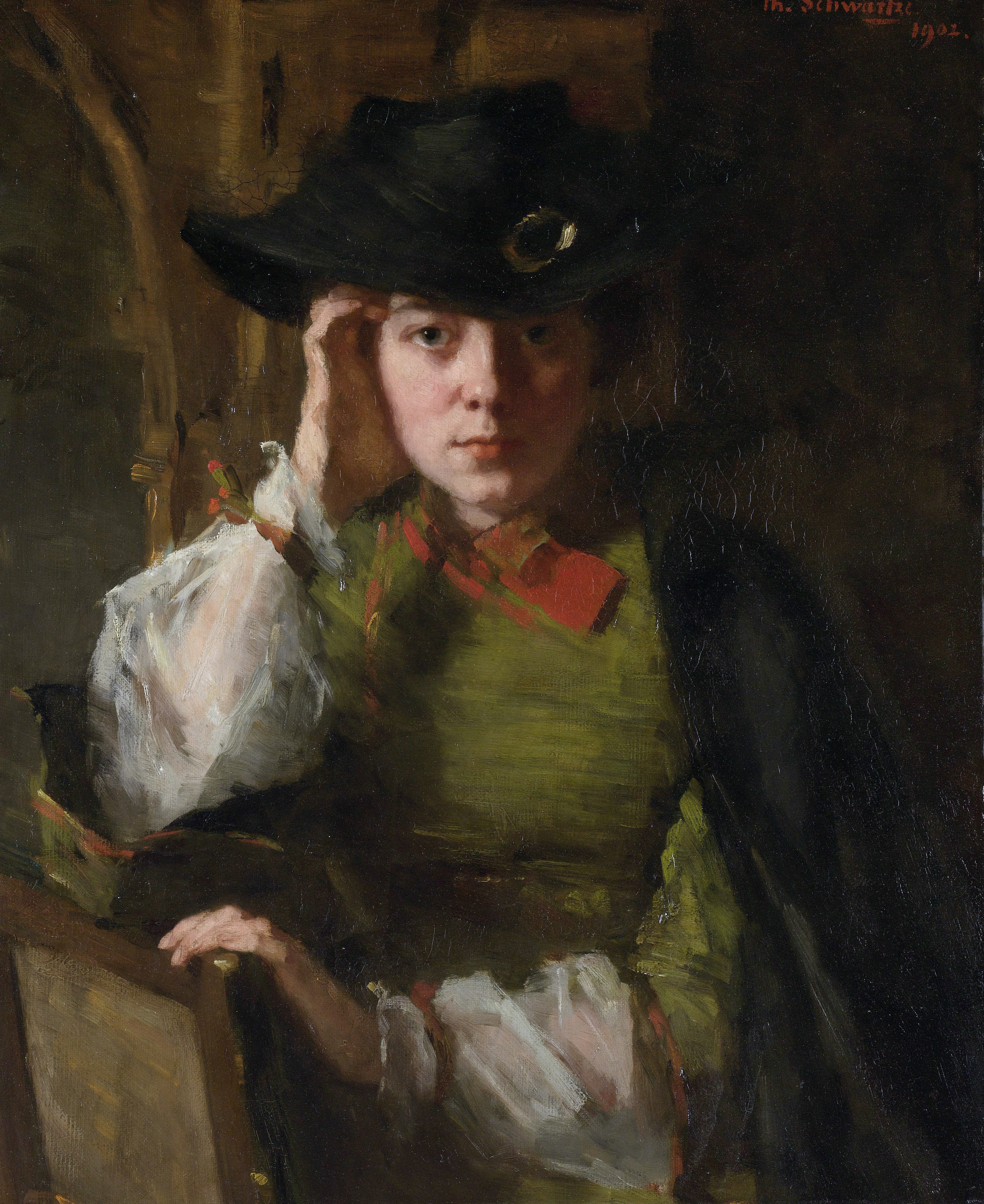
Thérèse Schwartze (1902): Portrait from Lizzy Ansingh.

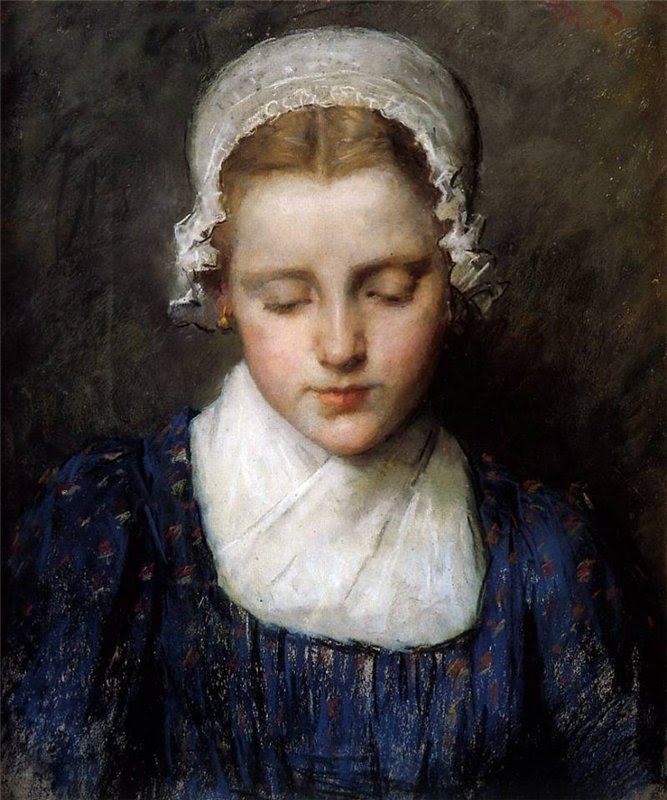
Thérèse Schwartze (1918): Portrait of a girl.

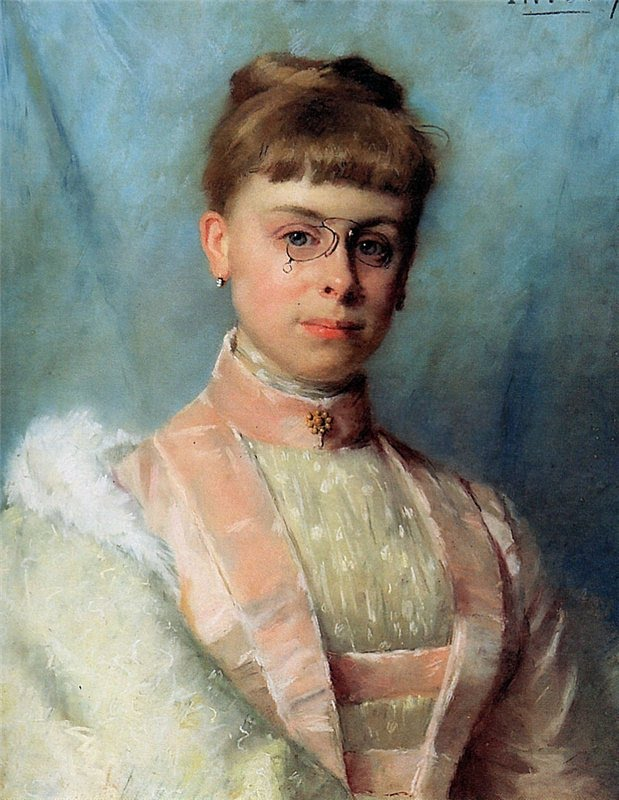
Thérèse Schwartze (1918): Portrait of Johanna Eugenia Theadora Van Hoorn Schouwe.
