= Ans van den Berg =

Dutch artist

- Portrait of Ans van den Berg by Jacoba Surie
- Born: 18 February 1873; Amsterdam, Netherlands
- Died: 6 October 1942 (aged 69); Amsterdam, Netherlands
- Known for: Painting

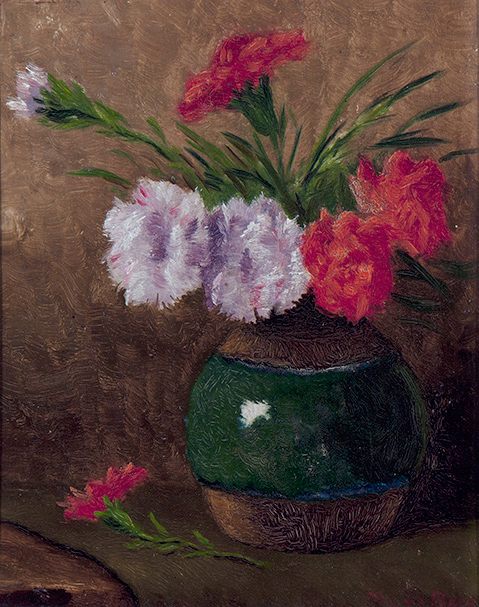
Still Life with Carnations

Ans van den Berg or Anna Carolina van den Berg (1873–1942) was a Dutch painter known for her still lifes.

== Biography ==
Berg was born in Amsterdam on 18 February 1873. She attended the Académie Colarossi in Paris. For over 30 years Berg shared a studio in Amsterdam with Jacoba Surie. Berg was a member of the Amsterdamse Joffers. Her portrait was painted by fellow artist Johanna Bauer-Stumpff which is in the collection of the Rijksmuseum.

Van den Berg died on 6 October 1942 in Amsterdam.
