= Jo Bauer-Stumpff =

Dutch painter

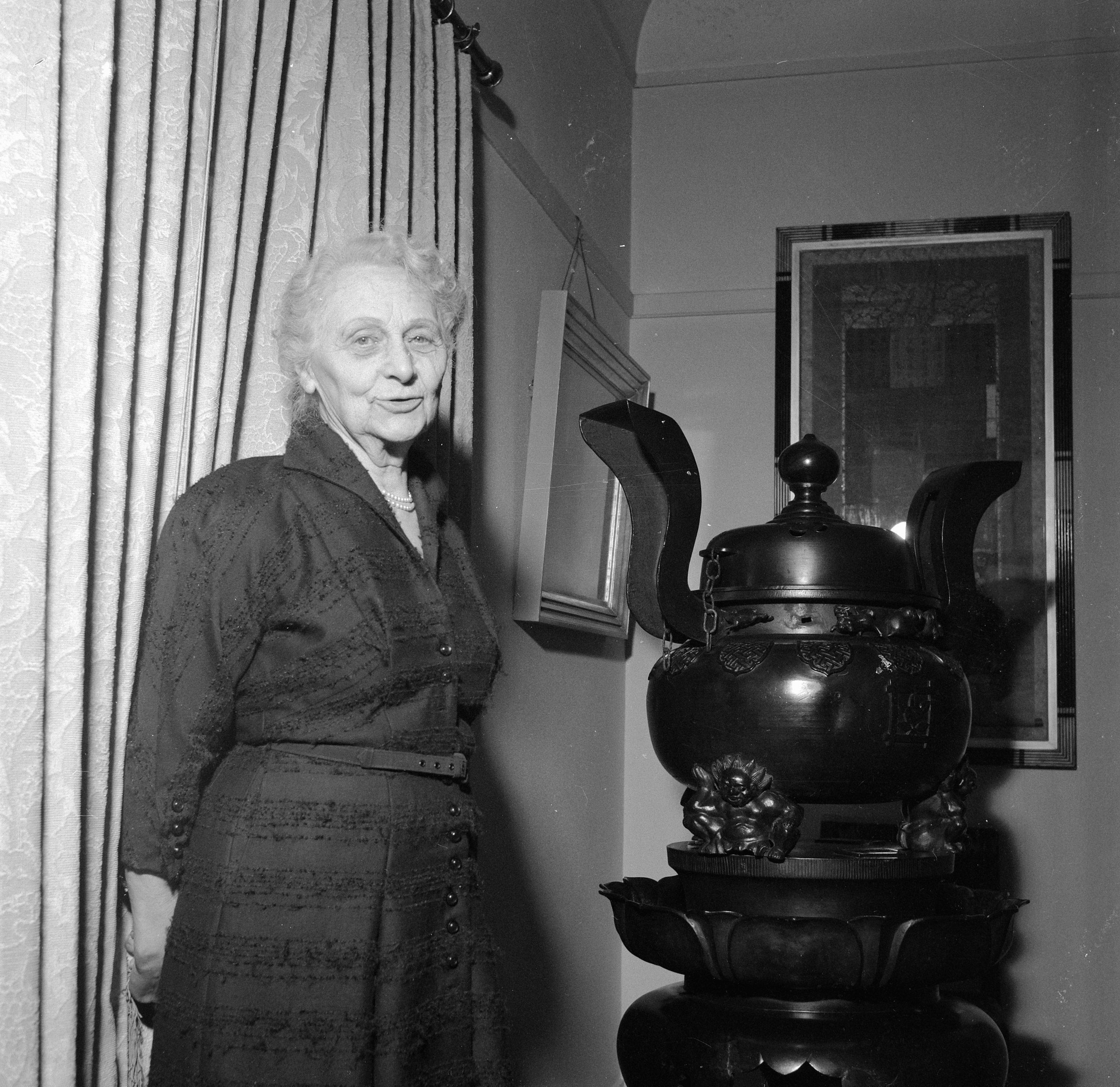
- Jo Bauer-Stumpff in 1958
- Born: 5 September 1873; Amsterdam, Netherlands
- Died: 19 December 1964 (aged 91); Amsterdam, Netherlands
- Known for: Painting
- Spouse: Marius Bauer (m. 1902)

Jo Bauer-Stumpff (5 September 1873 – 19 December 1964) was a Dutch painter.

Bauer-Stumpff was born in Amsterdam and trained at the Rijksakademie van beeldende kunsten there, where she studied under August Allebé. Her father William Stumpff was director-general at the Royal Dutch theatre. She was a member of Arti et Amicitiae (where she won a medal in 1952) and the Hollandse Aquarellisten Kring and is considered one of the Amsterdamse Joffers.

In 1902 she married the painter Marius Bauer. The couple lived in Villa Stamboel in Aerdenhout and lived in Amsterdam from 1916. They made trips abroad to the Dutch East Indies and Egypt. She stopped painting almost altogether after marriage and cared for her husband. The marriage was childless. After his death, she became more active as an artist again. She is known for still lifes and portraits. Her pupils were Ans van den Berg, Frederik Henderik de Meester, and Hillegonda Henriëtte Tellekamp.

Bauer-Stumpff died in Amsterdam.
