= Floris Arntzenius =

Dutch painter

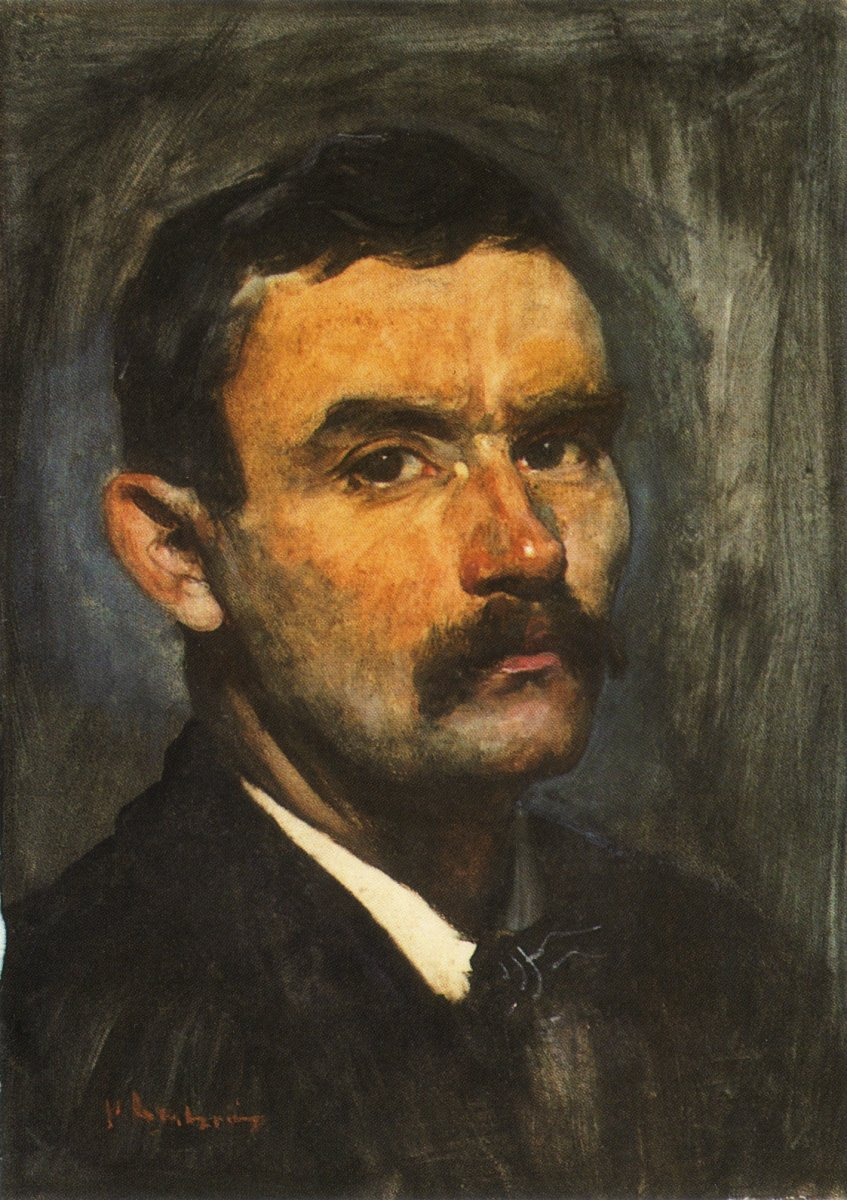
- Self-portrait, undated, private collection
- Born: Pieter Florentius Nicolaas Jacobus Arntzenius; 9 June 1864; Surabaya
- Died: 16 February 1925 (aged 60); The Hague
- Known for: Painting, Watercolor, Illustration art and printmaking

Pieter Florentius Nicolaas Jacobus Arntzenius (9 June 1864 – 16 February 1925) was a Dutch painter, water-colourist, illustrator and printmaker. He is considered a representative of the younger generation of the Hague School.

Arntzenius was born in Surabaya on the island of Java, where his father served in the Royal Dutch East Indies Army. In 1875, at the age of 11, he was sent to the Netherlands to Amsterdam to live with his aunt and uncle in order to complete his education.

In 1882, he became a student of Frederik Nachtweh. Under Nachtweh's supervision, he gained admission to the Rijksacademie van Beeldende Kunsten. During his time at the Rijksacademie, from 1883 to 1888, his teachers included August Allebé and Barend Wijnveld, and amongst his fellow students were Isaac Israëls, George Breitner, Willem Witsen and Jan Veth. After his studies in Amsterdam he spent another two years at the Koninklijke Academie voor Schone Kunsten in Antwerp, studying under Charles Verlat.

Back in Amsterdam, Arntzenius became a member of the artist societies Arte et Amicitiae (1890) and St. Lucas (1891), and he had a studio at the Sarphatistraat. In 1892, his mother became widowed and moved to The Hague, and Arntzenius also moved there to keep her company. Around the same time, his former fellow students Isaac Israëls and George Breitner left The Hague for Amsterdam to be a part of the capital's more vibrant artistic climate. At The Hague, the established painters of the first generation of the Hague School dominated artistic life.

Arntzenius became a member of the artist's society Pulchri Studio in The Hague in 1892. From 1893 to 1895, he shared Bernard Blommers's former studio with Cornelis Antonie van Waning. He also contributed illustrations to Elsevier Geïllustreerd Maandschrift from 1892 to 1894. In 1896, he was admitted to the Hollandsche Teeken Maatschappij, a society that promoted the medium of watercolours among its members. He got married in 1900 to Lide Doorman, a talented painter of floral still lives, who lived in the house opposite Arntzenius' mother, together they had four daughters, whom he frequently painted.

Arntzenius was an accomplished artist in several media, but especially his watercolours gained high praise. During his first years in The Hague, he painted landscapes in the typical Hague School style. Arntzenius later switched to mainly painting cityscapes and street scenes, just like Israëls and Breitner did in Amsterdam. Arntzenius' cityscapes were painted mainly in misty or rainy weather; he made use of these weather conditions to have his subjects reflected on the wet asphalt. He also painted a lot in Scheveningen, which had changed from the poor fishing village it was in the time of Jozef Israëls and Hendrik Willem Mesdag, into a popular seaside resort.

Though Arntzenius isn't considered to be a relevant artist nowadays, he was appreciated in his own day. He won prizes at the exhibitions of Munich, Venice, Pittsburgh and Brussels and his works sold well during his lifetime. His friends in The Hague included Willem Maris, Willem Bastiaan Tholen, Bernard Blommers and Herman Johannes van der Weele. In 1910, he opened a studio and started taking in students. During this time, he mostly painted portraits on commission for wealthy patrons. This he continued to do until he died of tuberculosis in 1925, at the age of 60.

== Gallery ==
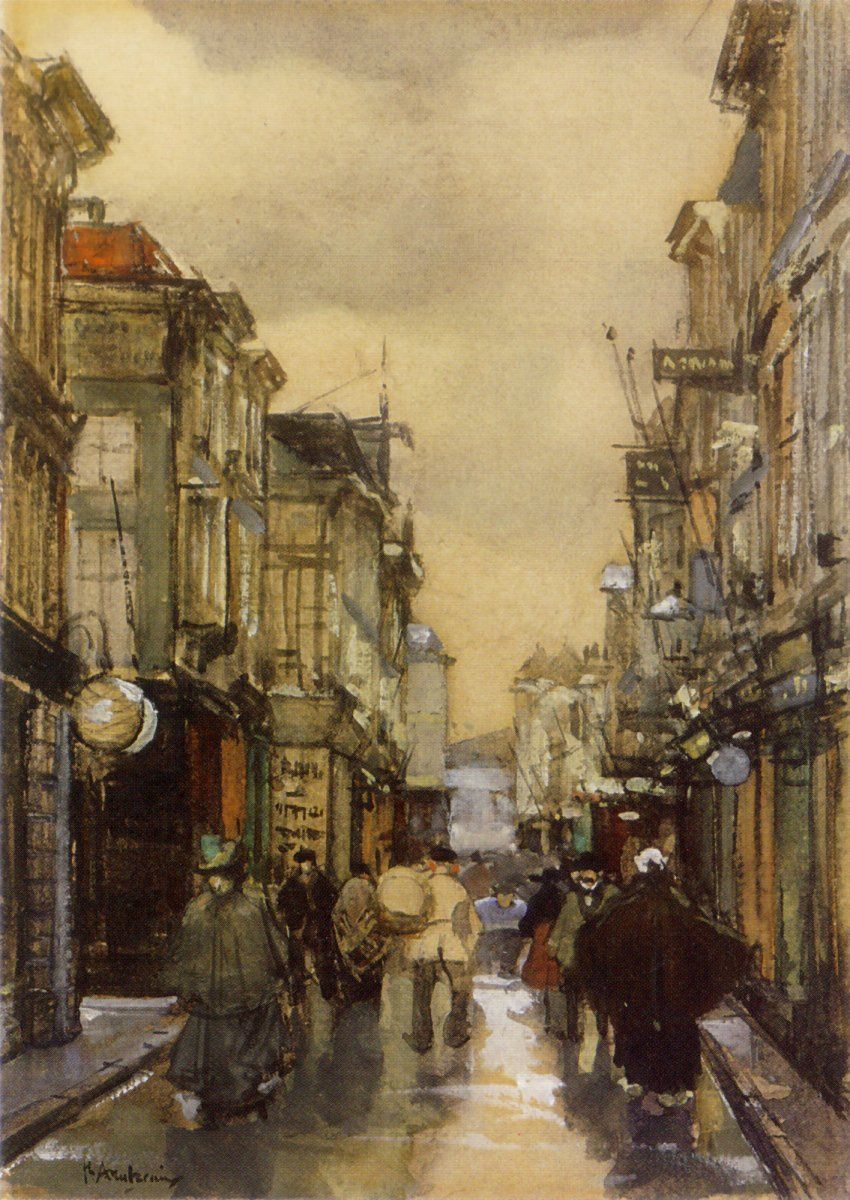
Spuistraat The Hague (gouache)

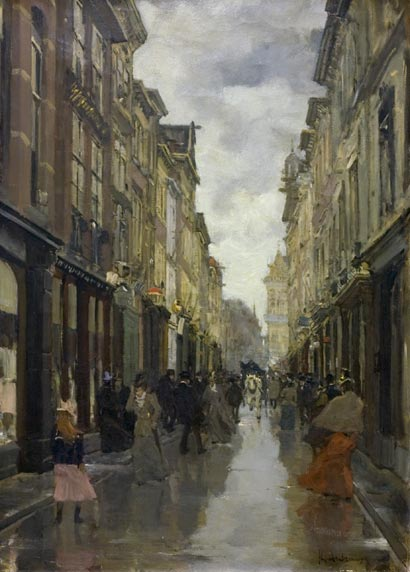
Spuistraat The Hague
(oil painting)
(Collection Haags Historisch Museum)

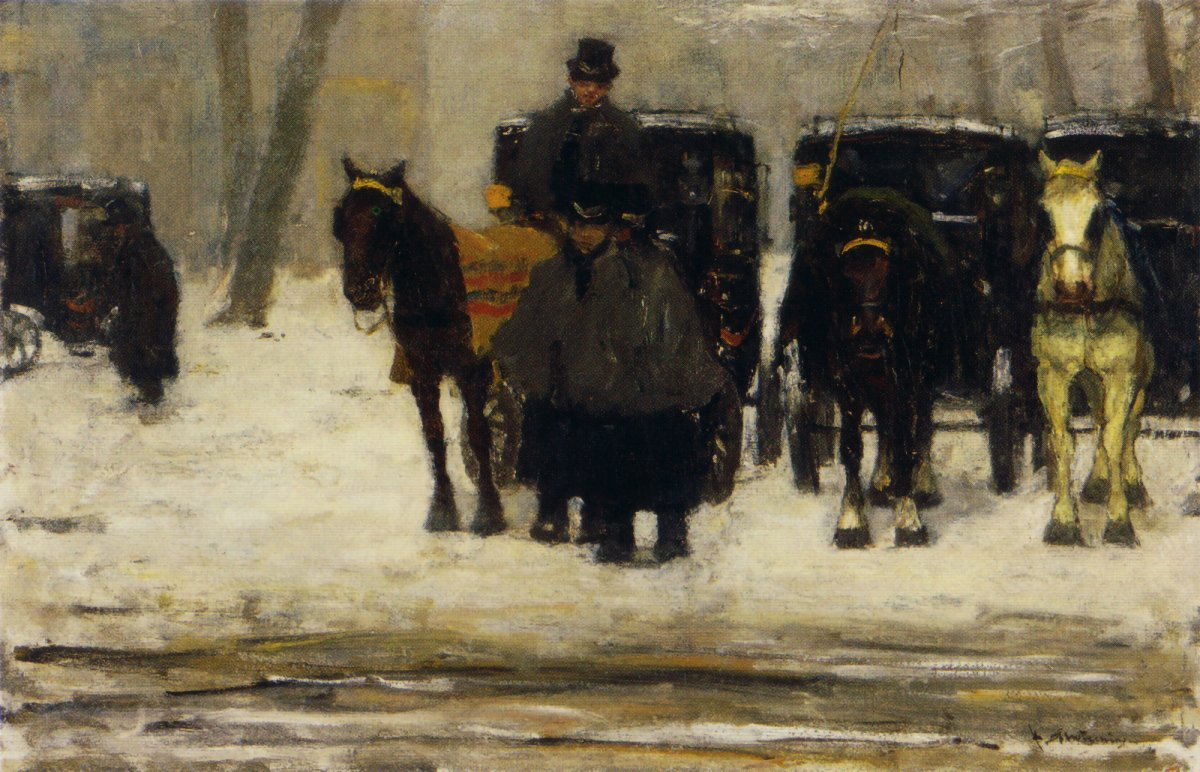
Rental coaches in the snow

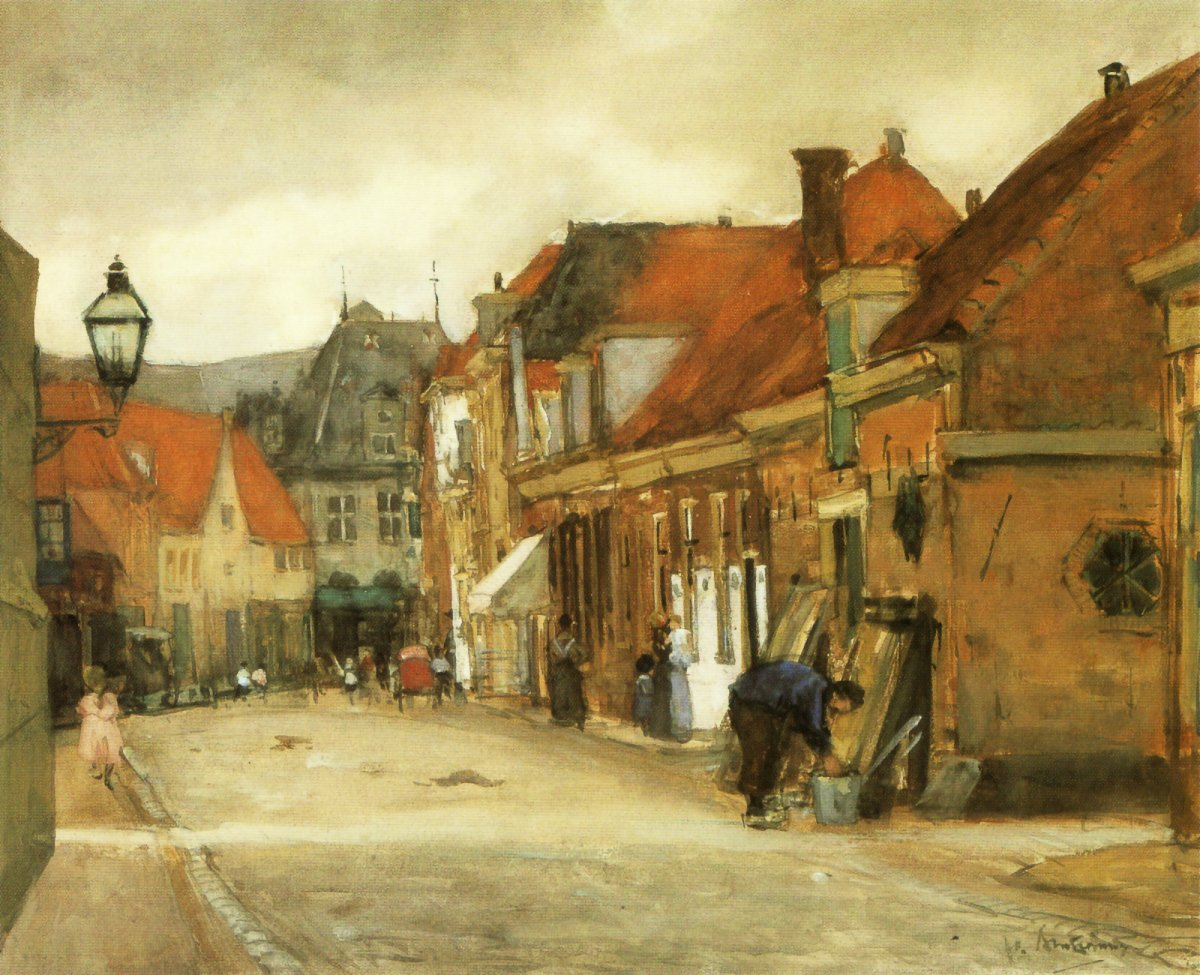
Street in Hoorn

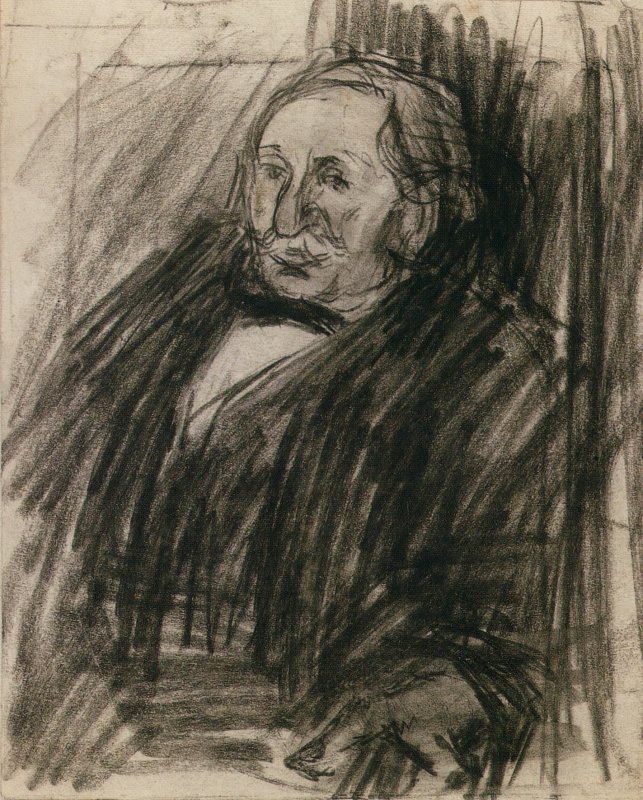
Portrait of Willem Maris (dwawing) (Collection Gemeentemuseum Den Haag)

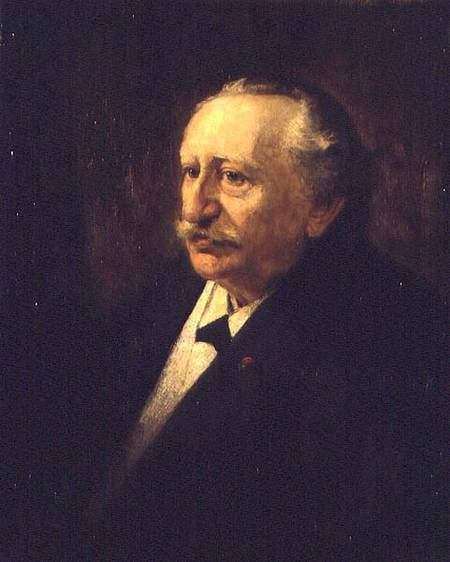
Portrait of Willem Maris (oil painting) (Collection Gemeentemuseum Den Haag)

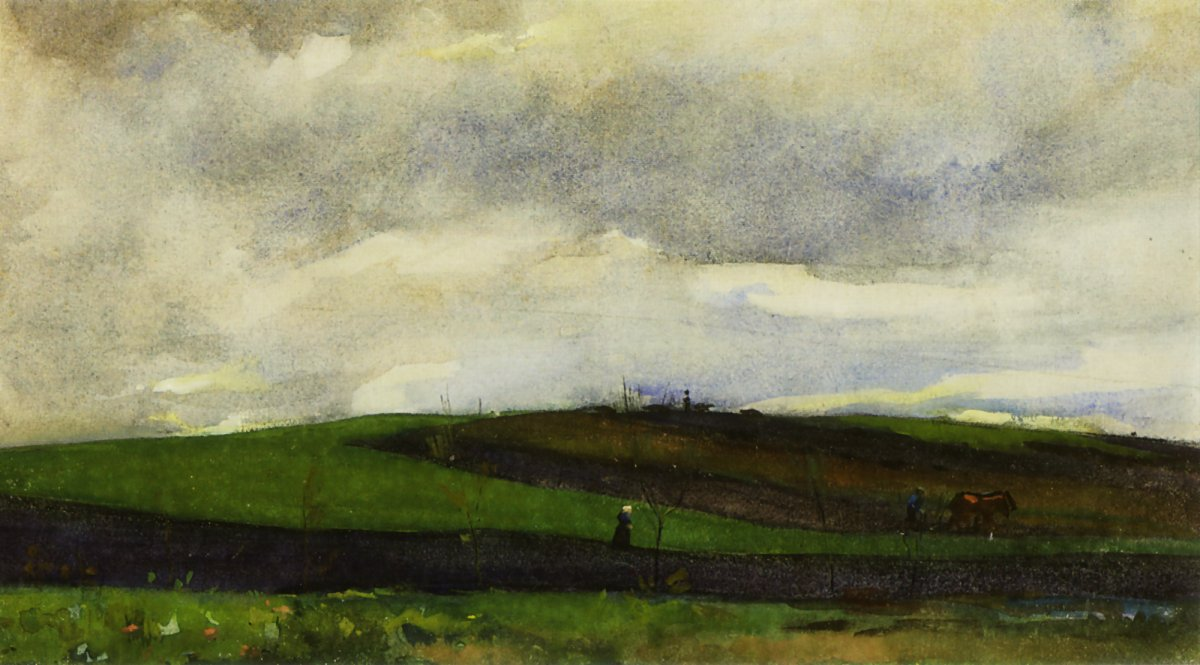
Ploughing farmer in undulating landscape

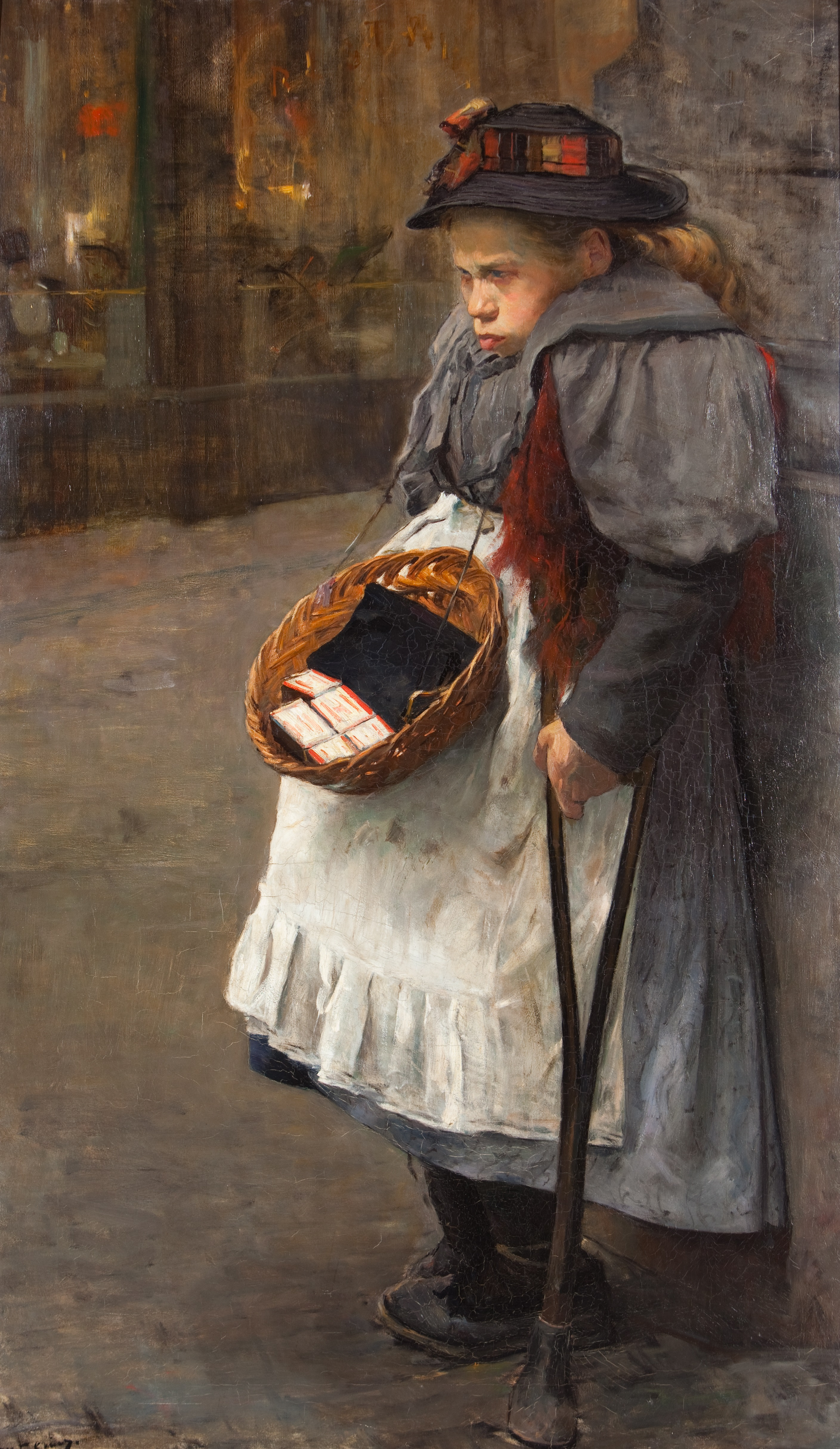
Matchstick girl (Collection Historical Museum of The Hague)

== Bibliography ==
- Gruyter, Jos. de (1968), De Haagse School, Lemniscaat
- Sillevis, John; Tabak, Anne (2001), Het Haagse School boek, Waanders Uitgeverij, ISBN 978-90-400-9540-5
- Sillevis, John; Heilmann, Christoph; Vignau-Wilberg, Thea (1989), München und die Haager Schule, Edition Braus, ISBN 3-925835-08-3
- Wagner, Anna (12 January 2015), "Pieter Florentius Nicolaas Jacobus (1864-1925)", Biografisch Woordenboek van Nederland
