= Loek Bos =

Dutch cartoonist, painter and sculptor

Loek Bos (born The Hague, 4 November 1946) is a Dutch cartoonist, painter and sculptor. He is a member of the Pulchri Studio in The Hague. Among his works is a memorial to the composer Cornelis Dopper, erected in Stadskanaal in 2010.
