= Jan Weissenbruch =

Dutch painter

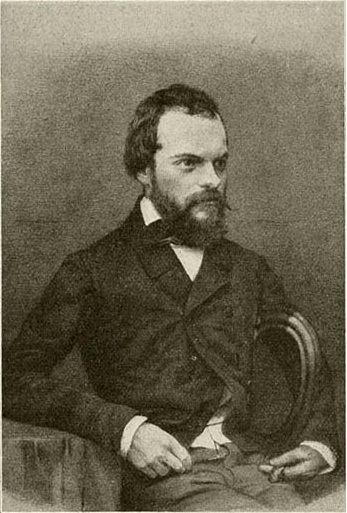
Jan Weissenbruch

Jan Weissenbruch (1822, The Hague – 1880, The Hague) was a 19th-century Dutch painter.

== Biography ==
According to the RKD he was the cousin of Jan Hendrik Weissenbruch and the older brother of the painters Isaac and Frederik Hendrik and like them studied at the Royal Academy of Art in The Hague. In 1846 he spent a year at the Koninklijke Academie voor Beeldende Kunsten in Amsterdam. He was a pupil of Isaac Cornelis Elink Sterk, Georg Christiaan Heinrich Hessler, Cornelis Steffelaar, Salomon Verveer, and Anthonie Waldorp. He is known as one of the founders of the Pulchri Studio and made watercolors, etchings and woodcuts as well as paintings, mostly of cityscapes and church interiors. In 1857 he won his first golden medal at an exhibition in the Hague. In the late 1860s he began to restore paintings, possibly because he suffered from agoraphobia, which hindered him in the last decade of his life. Johannes Huygens was his pupil.

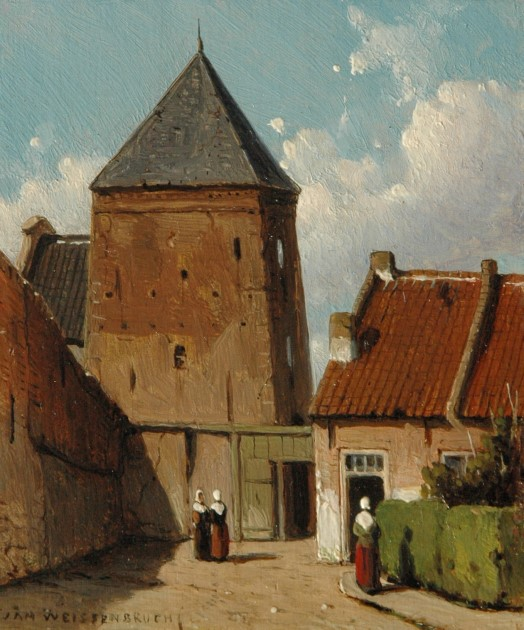
De Goilberdingerpoort in Culemborg, gezien vanuit het zuiden

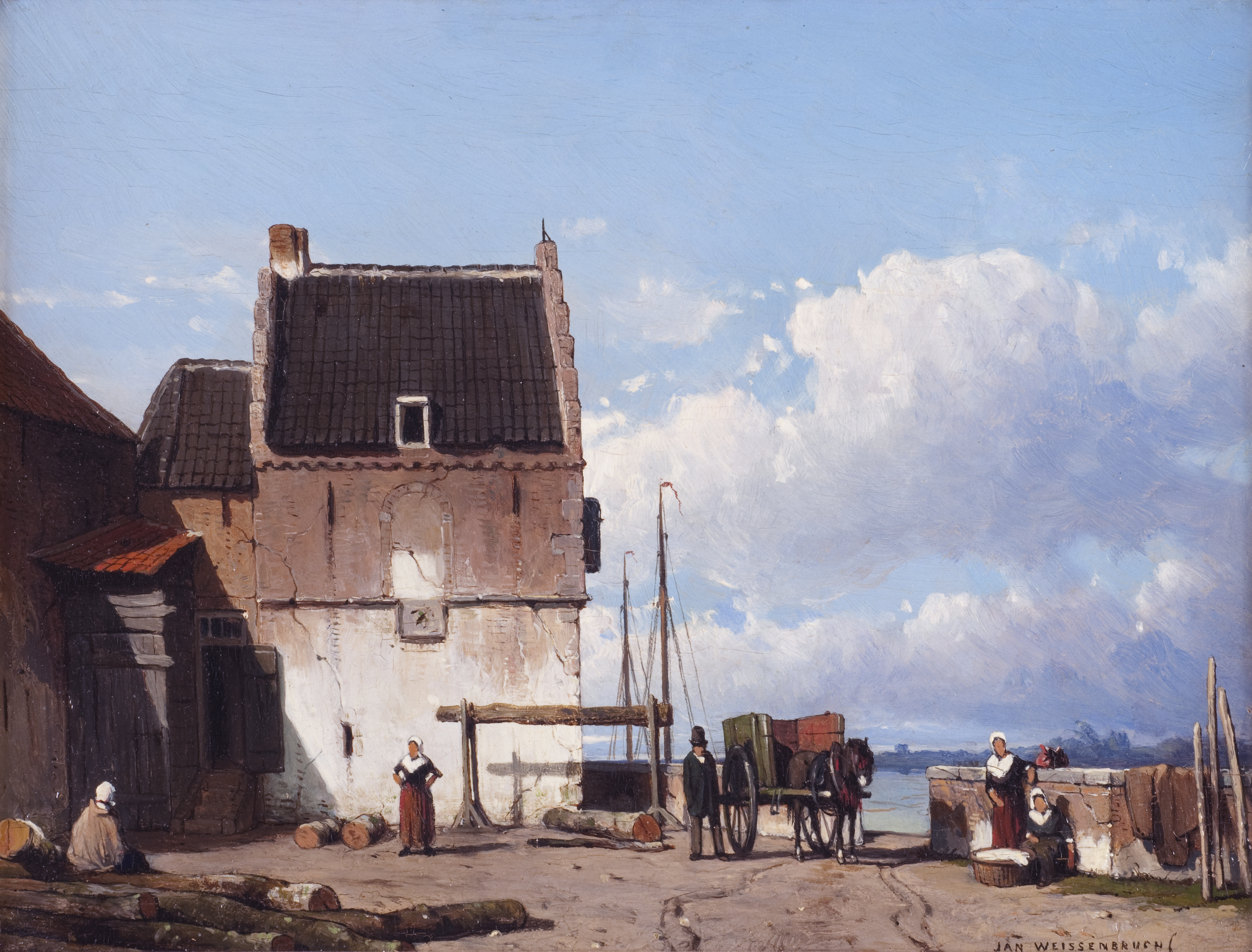
De oude haven met de Bottelpoort in Nijmegen (Museum Het Valkhof)

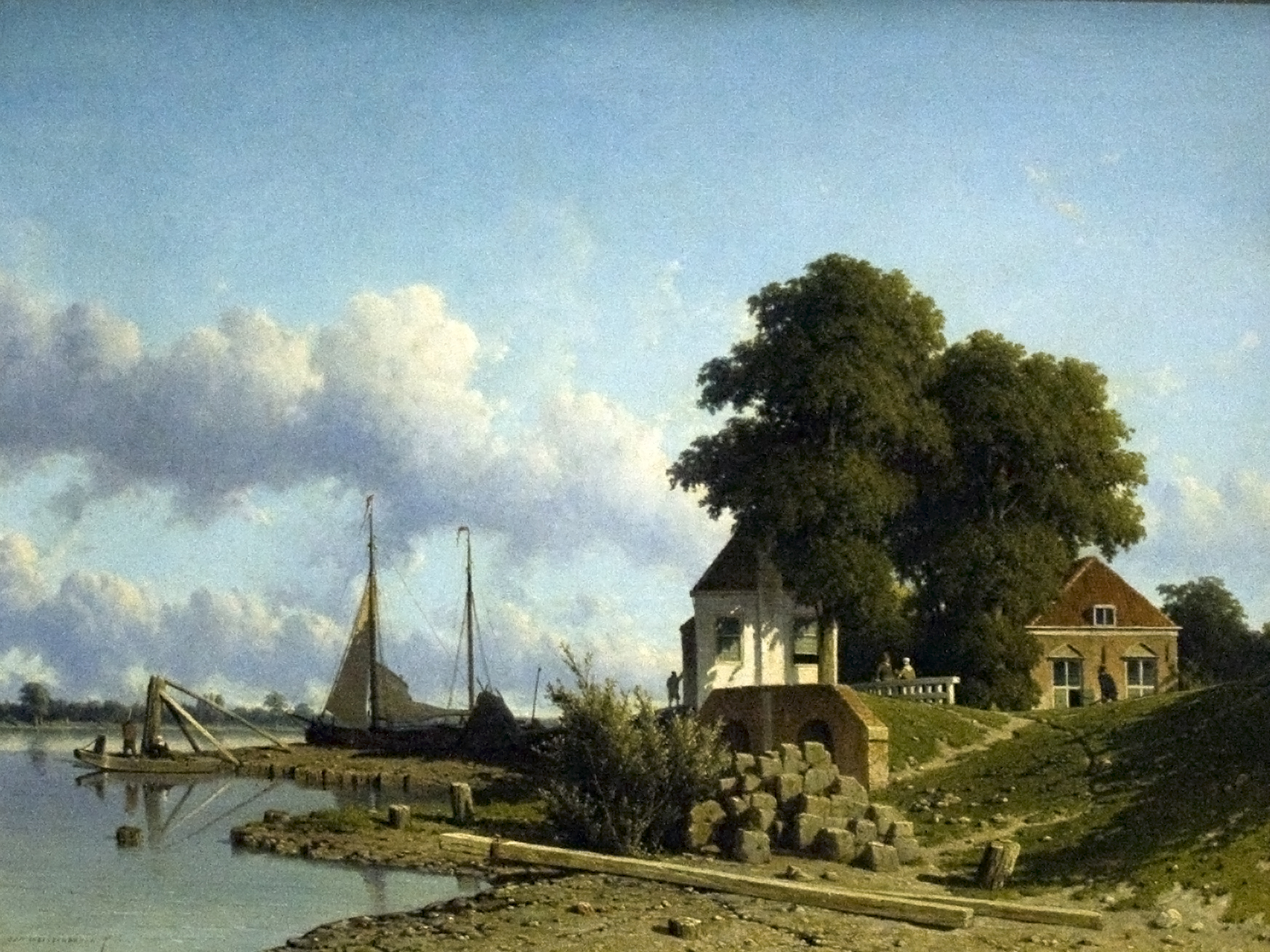
Aan de Lek bij Elshout (Teylers Museum)

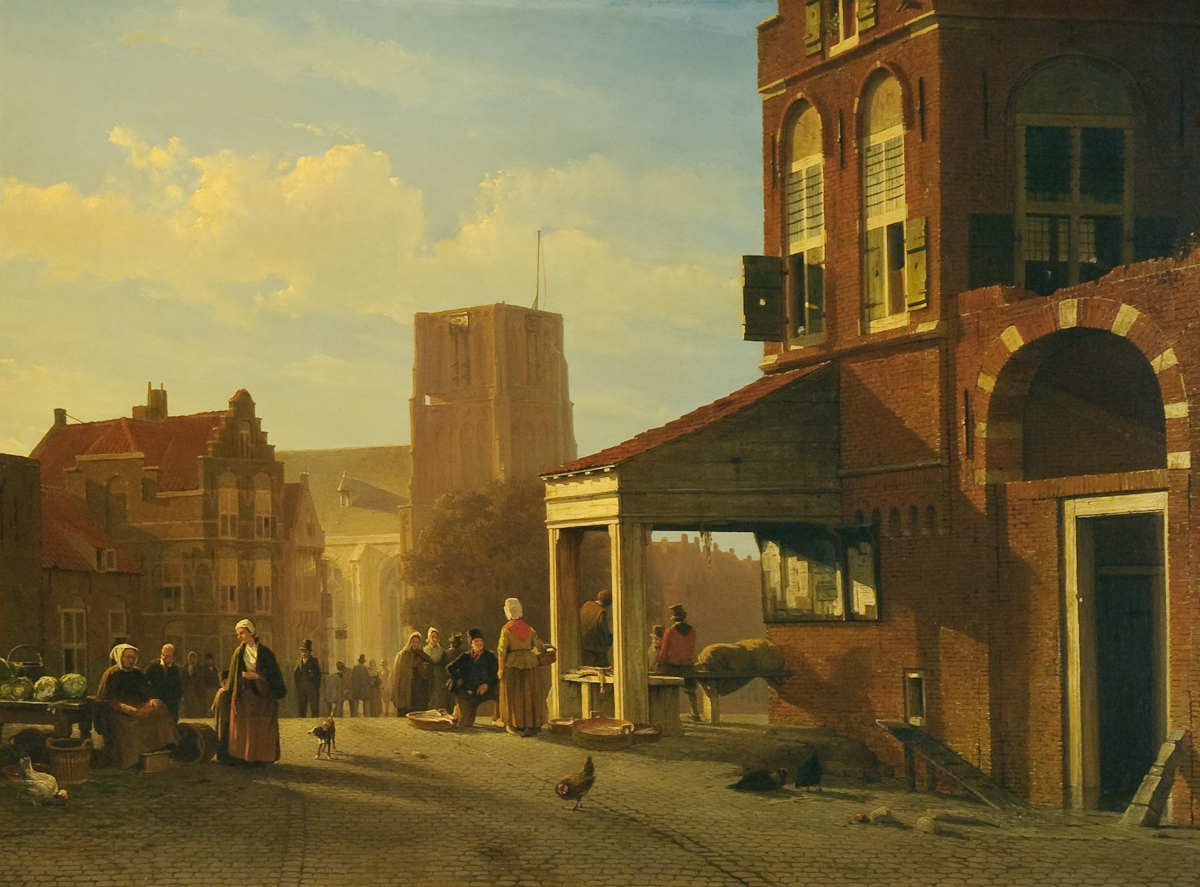
Market at Woudrichem, c. 1850

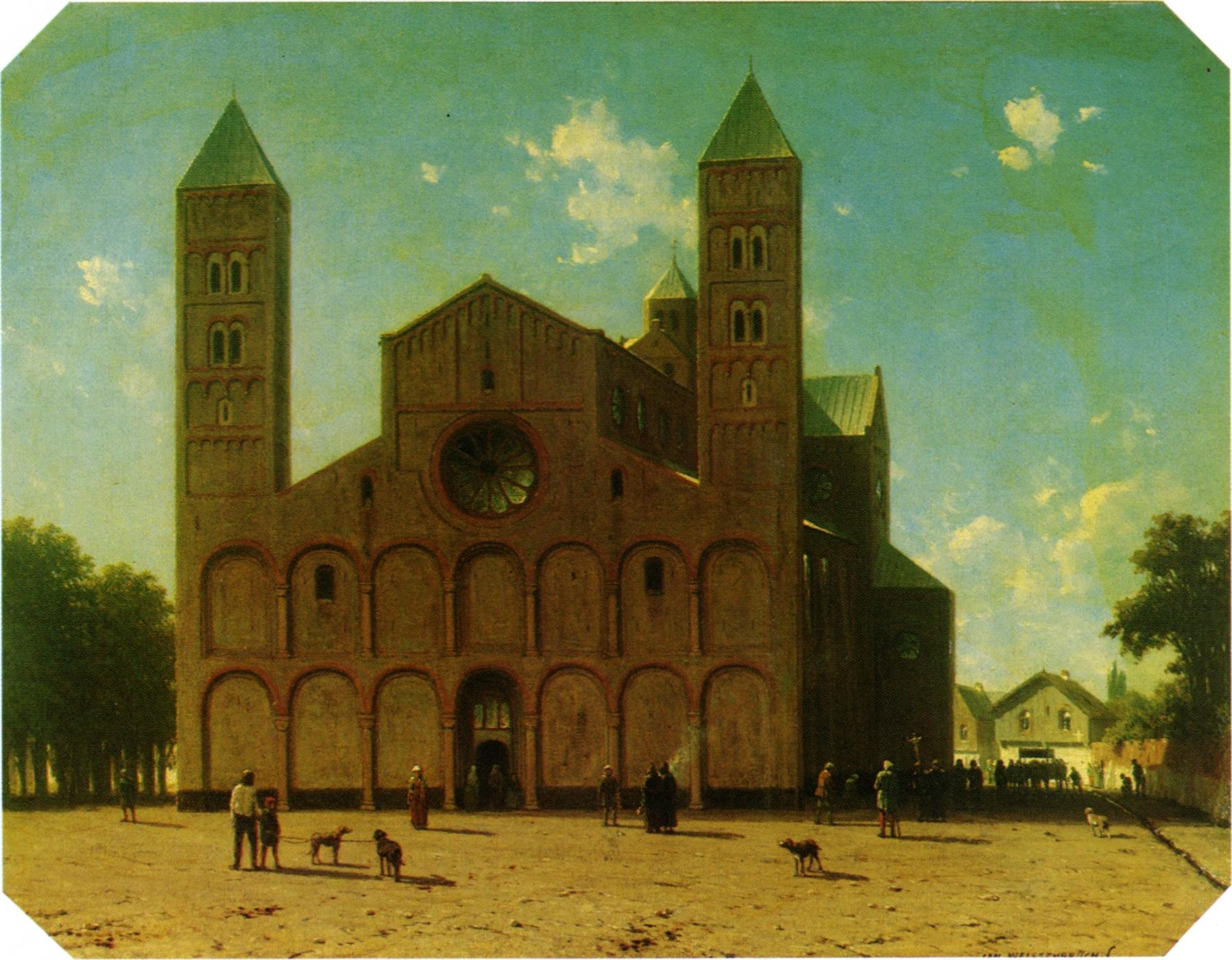
View of the Mariakerk in Utrecht, 1862–64
