= Ko Cossaar =

Dutch painter (1874–1966)

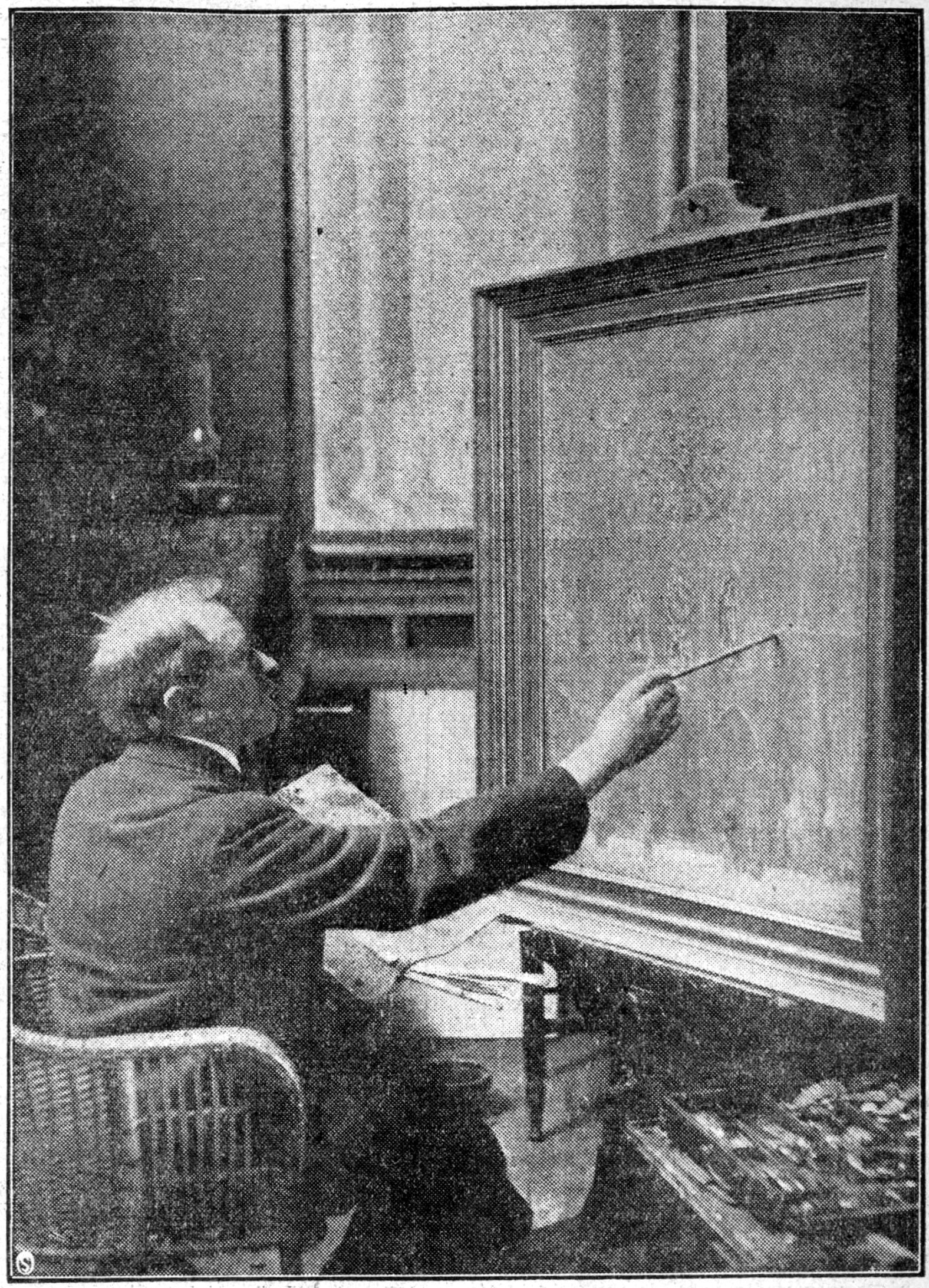
The Haque painters in their studio - mr. J.C.W. Cossaar, 1928

Jacobus Cornelis Wijnandus Cossaar (Amsterdam, 8 August 1874 – The Hague, 25 November 1966) was a Dutch painter working under the name Ko Cossaar. He was a member of the Pulchri Studio in The Hague. Cossaar started his professional career as a theatre stage decorator/artist while still a teenager. He subsequently developed himself into a well-rounded painter known for his church and harbor scenes as well as landscapes. During his 8 years in England he painted numerous scenes in and around London and Yorkshire, including church settings and coastal landscapes. He went on to paint the most notable churches of France, Italy and Holland, using his sense of perspective learned while painting his early stage backdrops.

Cossaar's work was included in the 1939 exhibition and sale Onze Kunst van Heden (Our Art of Today) at the Rijksmuseum in Amsterdam.
