= Pulchri Studio =

Dutch art society, institution and studio in The Hague, Netherlands

Coordinates: 52°04′55″N 4°18′43″E

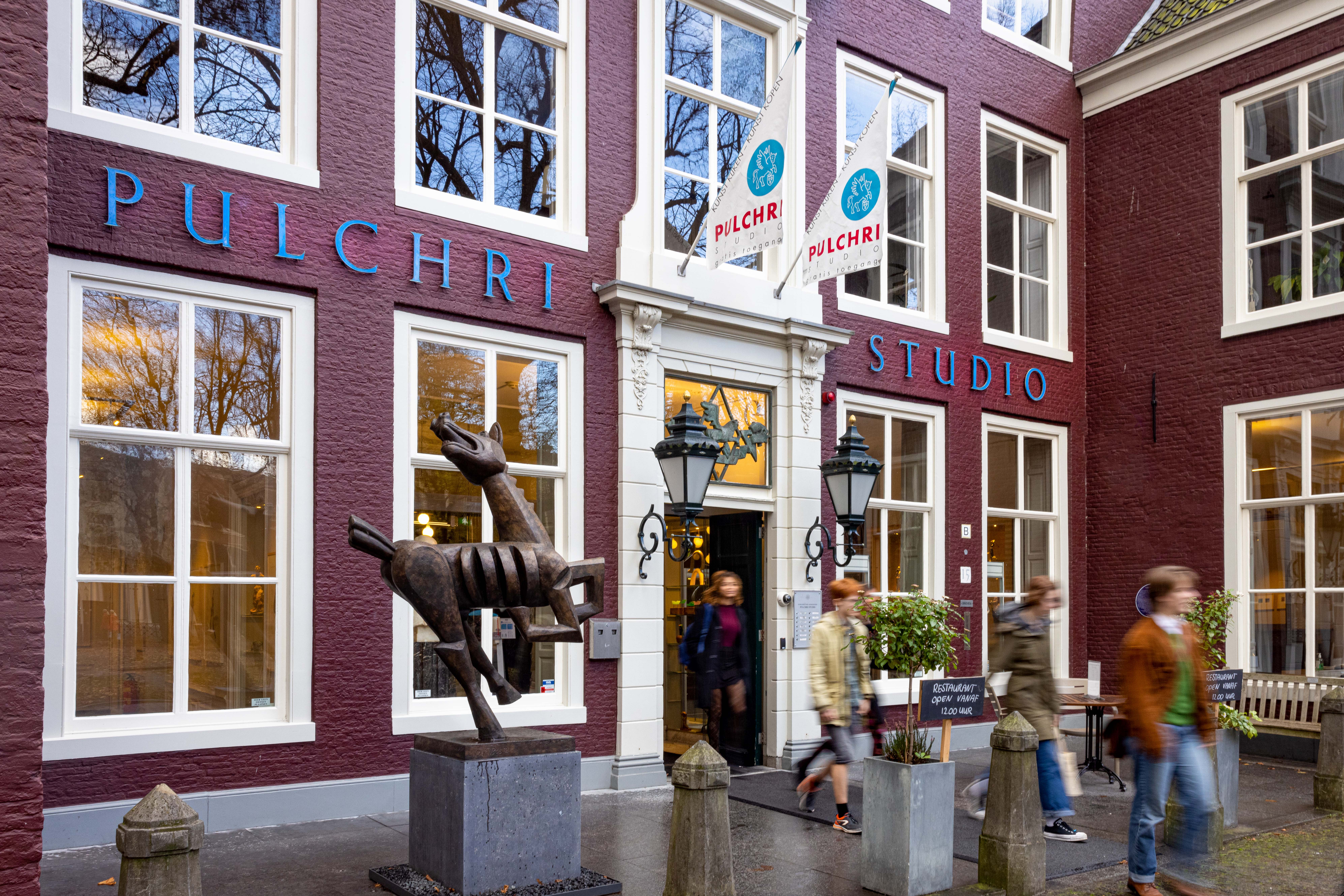
Pulchri Studio facade at the Lange Voorhout in The Hague.

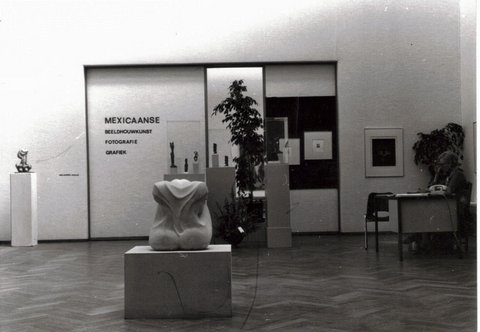
Exhibition of sculpture by Mexican artist Abel Ramírez Águilar.

Pulchri Studio (Latin: "For the study of the beautiful") is a Dutch art society, art institution and art studio based in The Hague ('s-Gravenhage), Netherlands.

This institute began in 1847 at the home of painter Lambertus Hardenberg. Since 1893 the club has its residence in the villa at Lange Voorhout in The Hague. Membership is made up of painters, sculptors, photographers and art lovers, with members selected by a committee.

An artist's membership allows them to exhibit their own works in the galleries of the Company. Guests have to be invited by members.

== Origins ==
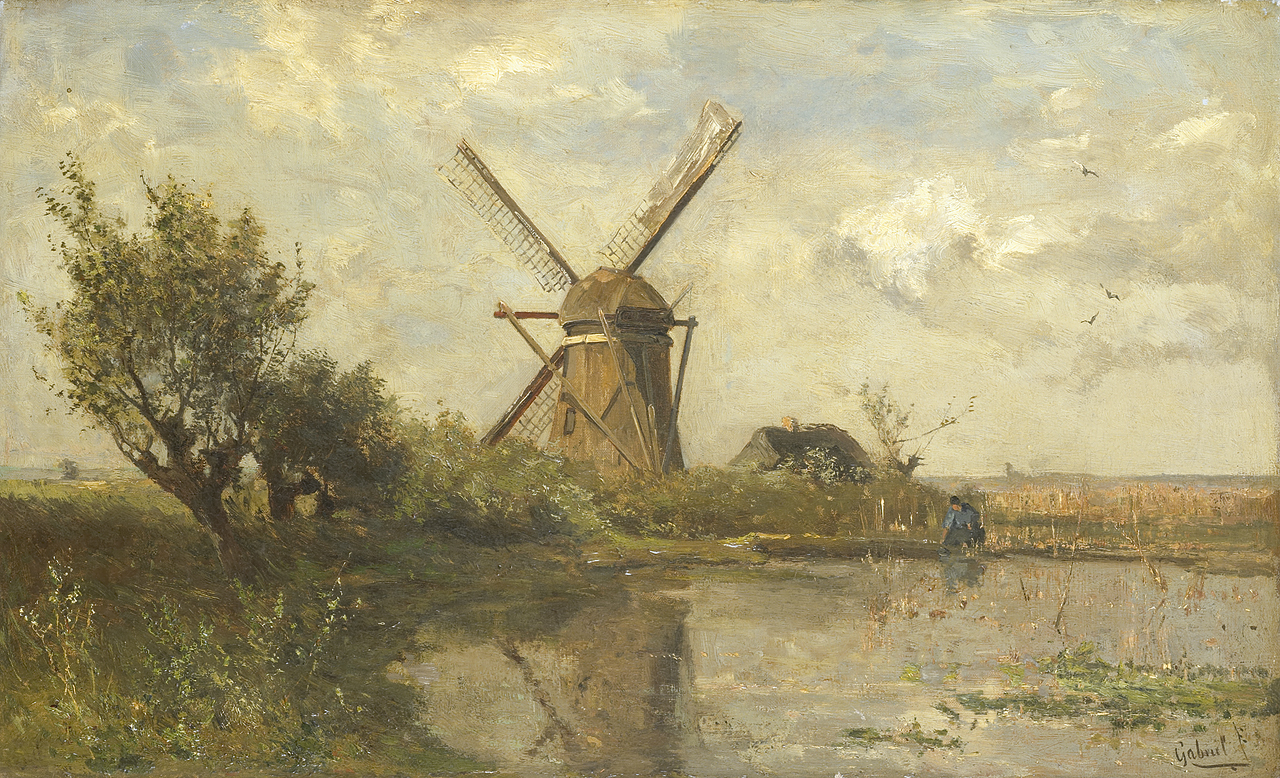
Paul Gabriël: Windmill in a pond.

The unspoilt countryside around even the rich coastal town of The Hague with its rural environment and the unspoiled landscape and nature and the nearby fishing village of Scheveningen attracted many young artists. The artists wanted to be far away from the state-run requirements of art (neo-classicism) and liked to decide their own way. The model was the successful artist colony of Barbizon south of Paris in the forest of Fontainebleau. The unaltered life of the people and the unspoilt polders and the North Sea coast played an important role. They wanted to be far away from the beginning in the Netherlands industrialisation in Amsterdam and Rotterdam.

== History ==
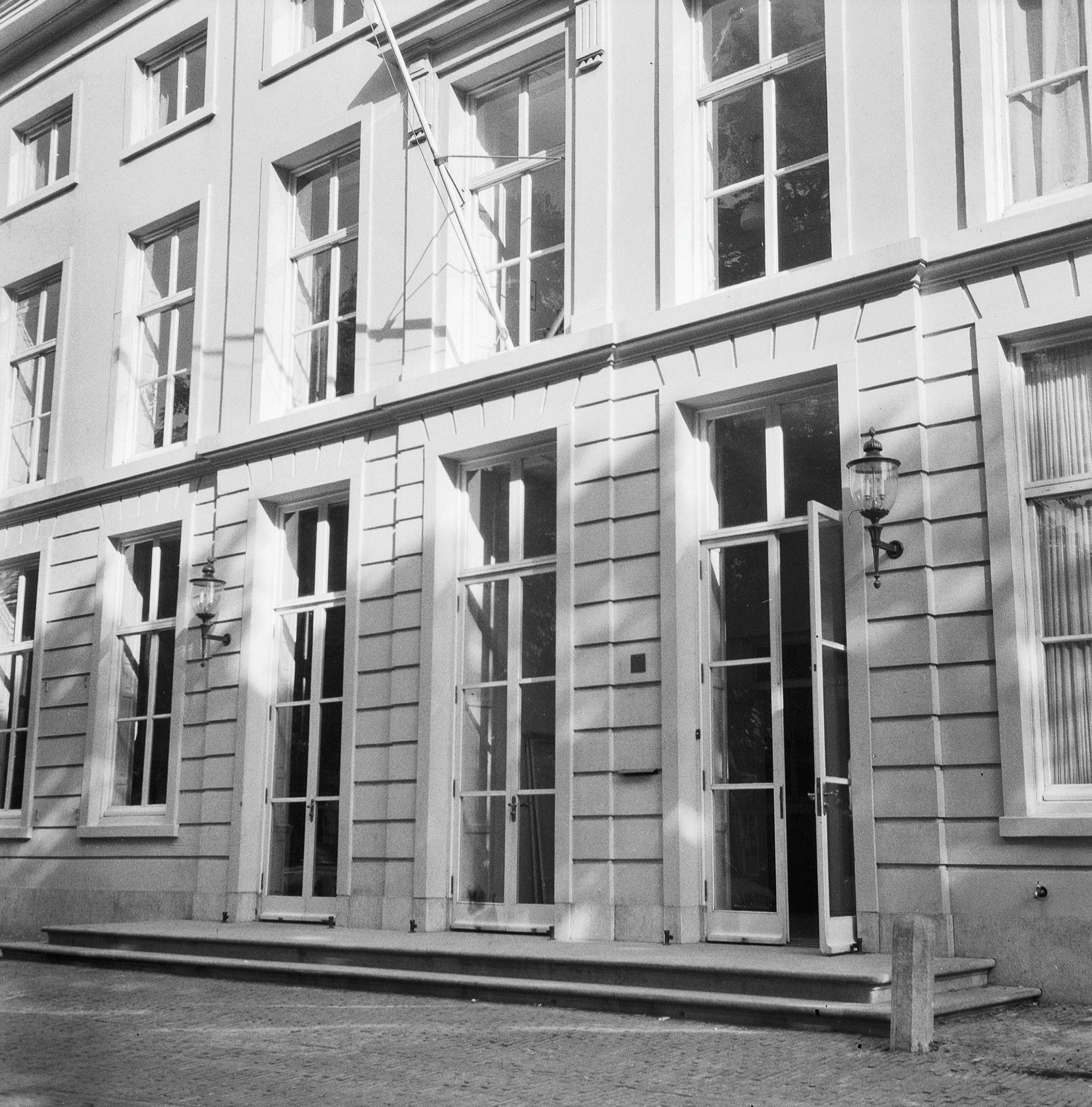
Diligentia.

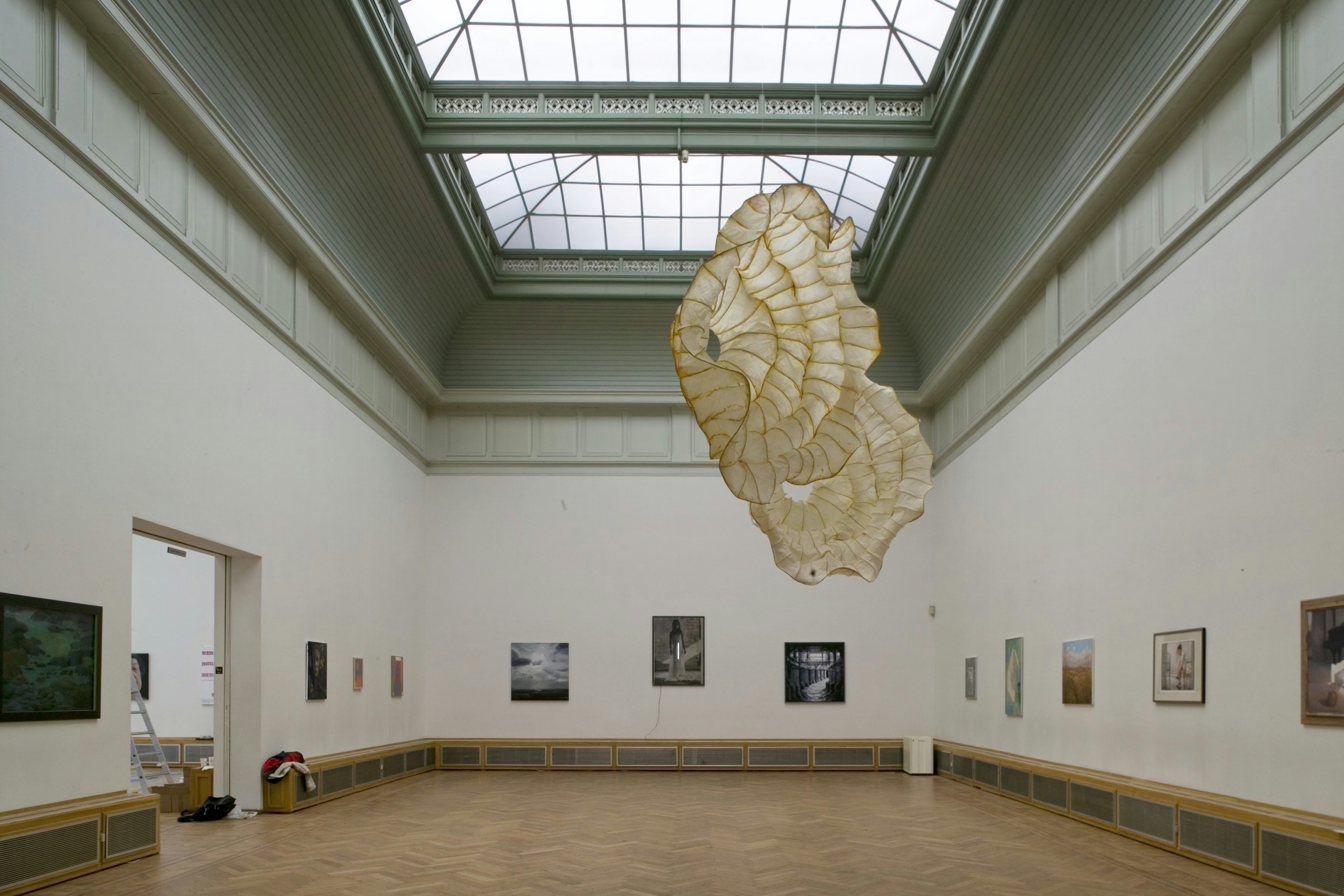
Exhibition with a view to the entrance.

Following the abolition of the patronage for artist they were searching for a new way. The city of 's-Gravenhage (The Hague) with its surroundings and the coastal landscape of the North Sea at Scheveningen became attractive for young painters. In 1847 with the establishment of the association Pulchri Studio such a new approach has been emerged. These artist's association is a typical Dutch development. It stands in the continuation of the tradition of the old academies of the 17th and 18th centuries. A special role has played gatherings, which were called art considerations (Kunstbeschouwingen). They offered the artists the opportunity to present their own works the other members and to exchange information with the other painters. This way of handling the works creators as an Apprentice with other artists as Master has been the guarantee of the success of the Hague School. The location served as a studio and workshop. Right at the beginning this cooperative had no exhibition rooms. Alternatively the painters participated in the two or three-yearly Exhibition of Living Masters. – In 1882, Vincent van Gogh participated in such an art appreciation along with Bosboom and Henkes. The location had the function of the social contact to the native population. It wasn't only a place of social encounter, but at the same time it offered to the artists the opportunity to communicate with collectors and dealers. – This was very important.

Among the founding members of Pulchri has been Lambertus Hardenberg, Willem Roelofs, Jan Hendrik Weissenbruch and Bartholomeus Johannes van Hove. In 1847, Van Hove has been the first chairman of the artists association. Short time later King Willem II. took over the patronage. A short time later Johannes Bosboom, Jozef Israëls, Hendrik Willem Mesdag, Jan Weissenbruch and some lesser-known artists joined Pulchri. Subsequent significant members are also Jan Sluyters, Paul Citroen and Willy Sluiter.

Many painters, who are today attributed to the Hague School, had position on the board and made this cooperative to a stronghold: Bosboom was chairman from 1852 to 1853, Israëls from 1875 to 1878, and Mesdag from 1898 to 1907. But even Jacob Maris and Willem Maris, Anton Mauve, Roelofs and Jan Weissenbruch were members of the executive committee. They were responsible for the drawing room, the art considerations or the social meetings.

The growing membership forced the organizers to expand and in 1901 it was moved to the building on the Lange Voorhout 15.

In 2004, a number of works from Pulchri were stolen, later recovered in 2007.

== The two rival cooperatives ==
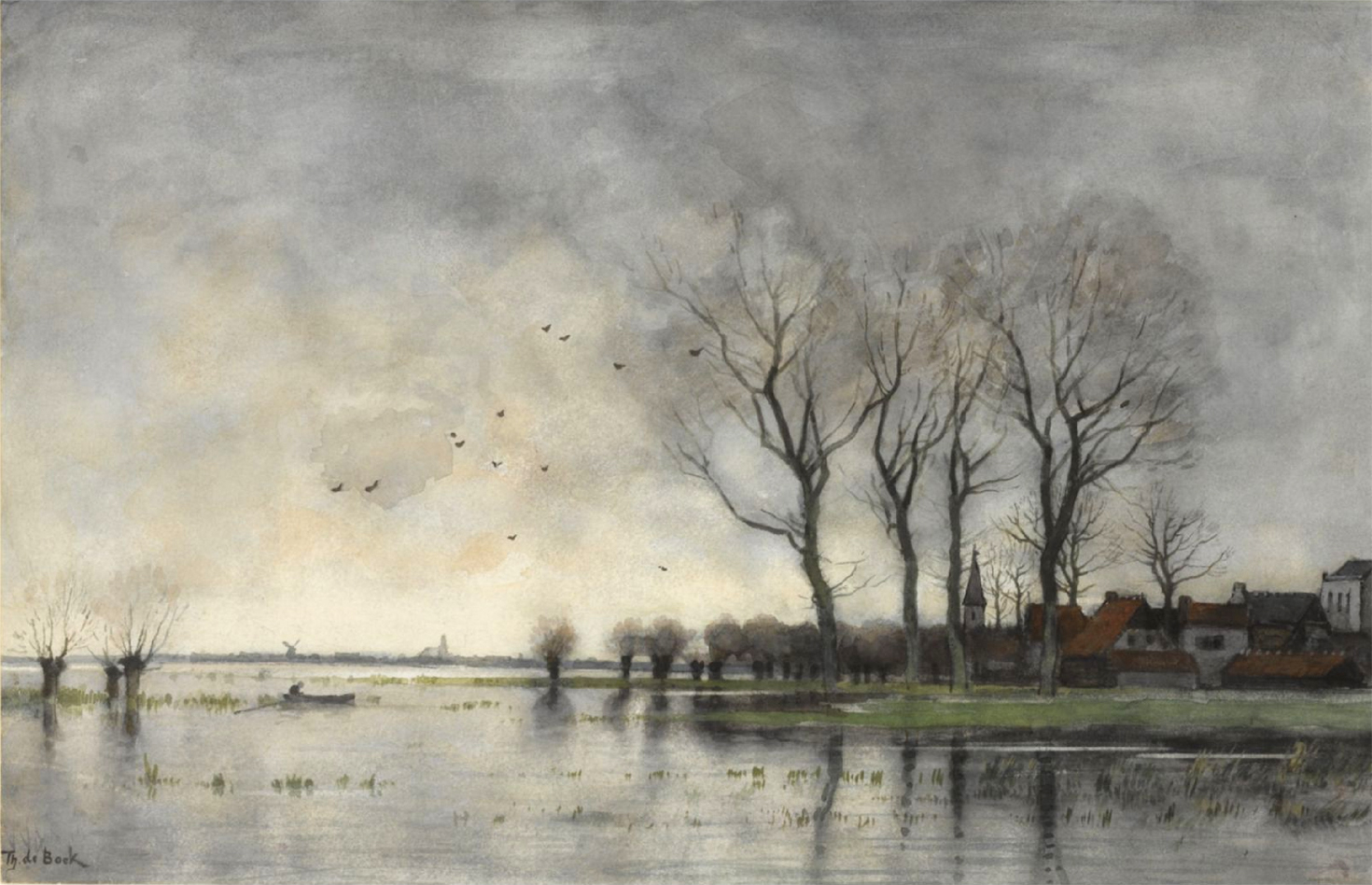
Théophile de Bock (1895/1905): A town on the river Vecht – private collection.

During its turbulent history there were attempts at secession and forming counter companies. None of them would ever attain the importance of Pulchri Studio. But this is an indication that the politics of these cooperatives is not always met with broad approval. One of these countermovements is the Haagse Kunstkring. In 1891 this cooperative was created by the painter Théophile de Bock and the architect Paul du Rieu. Loosely translated, It has remained until now and for its centenary was awarded with the medal of the city of The Hague.

In 1884 a smaller Artists' Association – Arti et Industriae was established in The Hague, in order to promote Dutch art craft. It has a pension fund, too. From the beginning it was inclined towards the subject of industry and industrial progress; it has a completely different orientation than the Hague School with her Pulchri Studio, which wanted to immortalize the untouched nature and the genuine life in the country, the podern and on the coast. – Thus it would never attain the significance and charisma of the Pulchri Studio. Arti et Industriae had set the goal of contact and coordination. They organize exhibitions, too. However, their existence was ensured by the proximity to the seat of government.

== Pulchri Studio and the Art Academy ==
From the Hague School and the Royal Academy of Art, The Hague had a favorable effect on the development of the artists' association Pulchri Studio. This society assumed the function of the promotion of the fine arts. There were excellent teachers and students in this environment. Willem Maris, Johan Hendrik Weissenbruch and Georg Breitner were also trained at the Art Academy of Bosboom.

== Pulchri Studio and the Hollandsche Teekenmaatschappij ==
The cooperative of Pulchri Studio was open to new technics in painting in the fine art. This resulted in the panel painting to another movement within the Dutch Impressionism, the Hague School.

In Brussels in the year 1855 the Society for watercolour-painting, the "Société Belge des watercolorist" was founded. She was quite successful. This movement was an expression of social and country-specific implementation of the very successful work of The Royal Watercolour Society to London. Precisely because of the contacts with the environment of the Académie Royale des Beaux-Arts in Brussels, the watercolours were attractive again as a version of the painting for artists. Indeed, this watercolour technique had reached their third heyday from the end of the 19th century to the early 20th century.

On 31 January 1878 the Hollandsche Teekenmaatschappij (in English: Dutch Drawing Society) was founded. Its founding members belonged to the core of the Hague School – the movement of the Dutch Impressionism and thus the Pulchri Studio. The society was so organized that it was independent, but closely linked to Pulchri Studio remained. Its honorary members included painters from Belgium, Germany and Italy.

In 1901, this society ceased to exist.

== Policy and Pulchri Studio ==
The Society Pulchri wasn't as conservative as Arti et Amicitiae to Amsterdam. Yes, they even rejected the traditional painting styles.

In the royal capital of 's-Gravenhage (The Hague) his caused an uproar and a political issue, too. By the king Willem III Hermanus Koekkoek had received a medal in recognition of a work. From Pulchri came the objection that this painting would no longer correspond to the current state of the art. – In public, the Hague School took the opposite position and stood against the official art policy of the Dutch king. This was notably represented by Artzt, de Bock, Bosboom, Israëls, Jacob and Willem Maris, Mauve, Mesdag and Neuhuys.

In addition they made known that neither one may send them a tender for an art competition nor they will take part in a competition any more.

In the circles that represented the new, radical painting style of impressionism or were only open, it was believed to have triggered something. In those days the queen tried to calm things down by their commitment to Pulchri. There was a no significant change in the policy of the king. – The disappointment was very big and they had to choose their own way.

== Notable members: 19th century ==
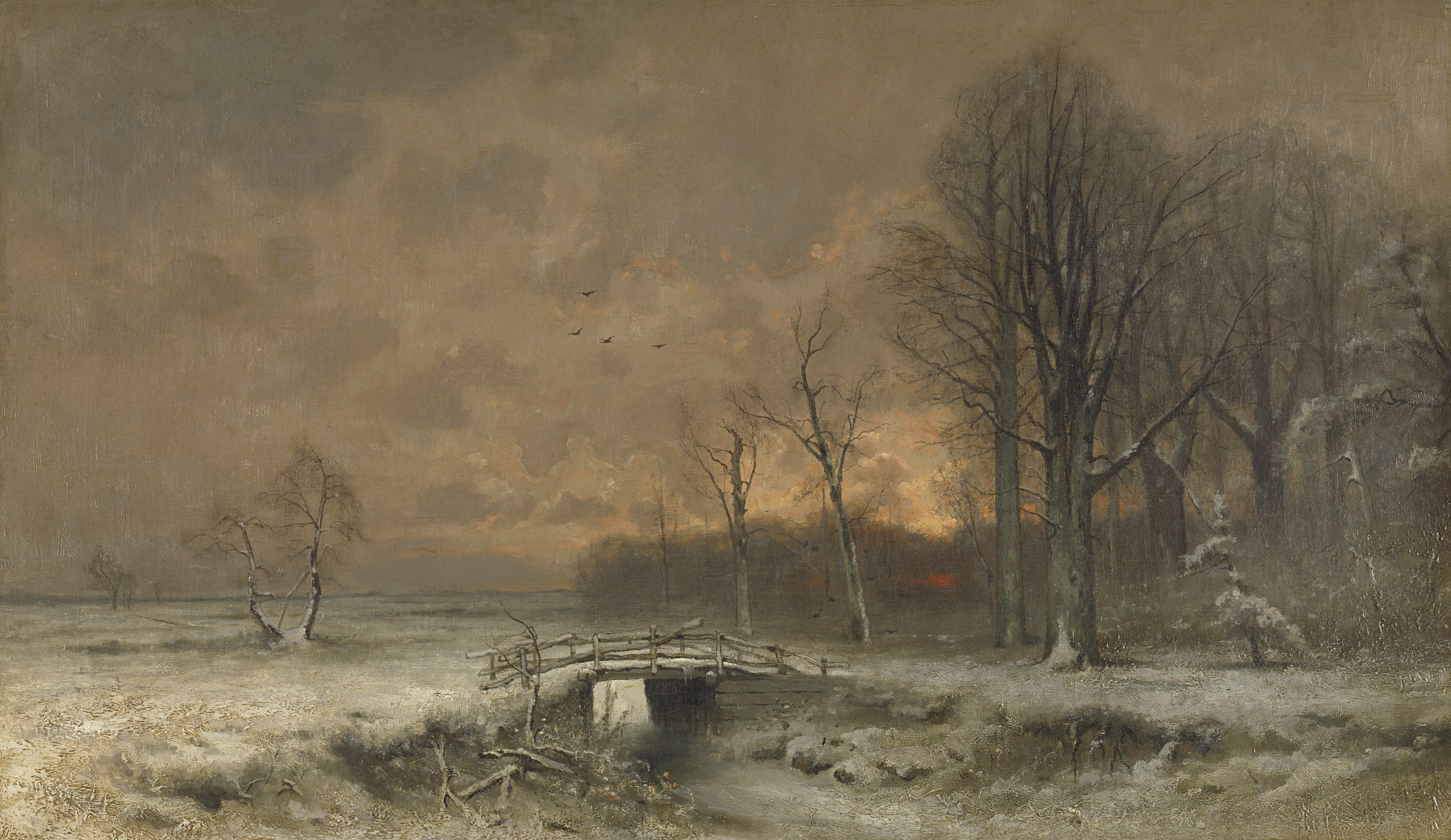
Louis Apol: Winter landscape with sunset between trees (Rijksmuseum).

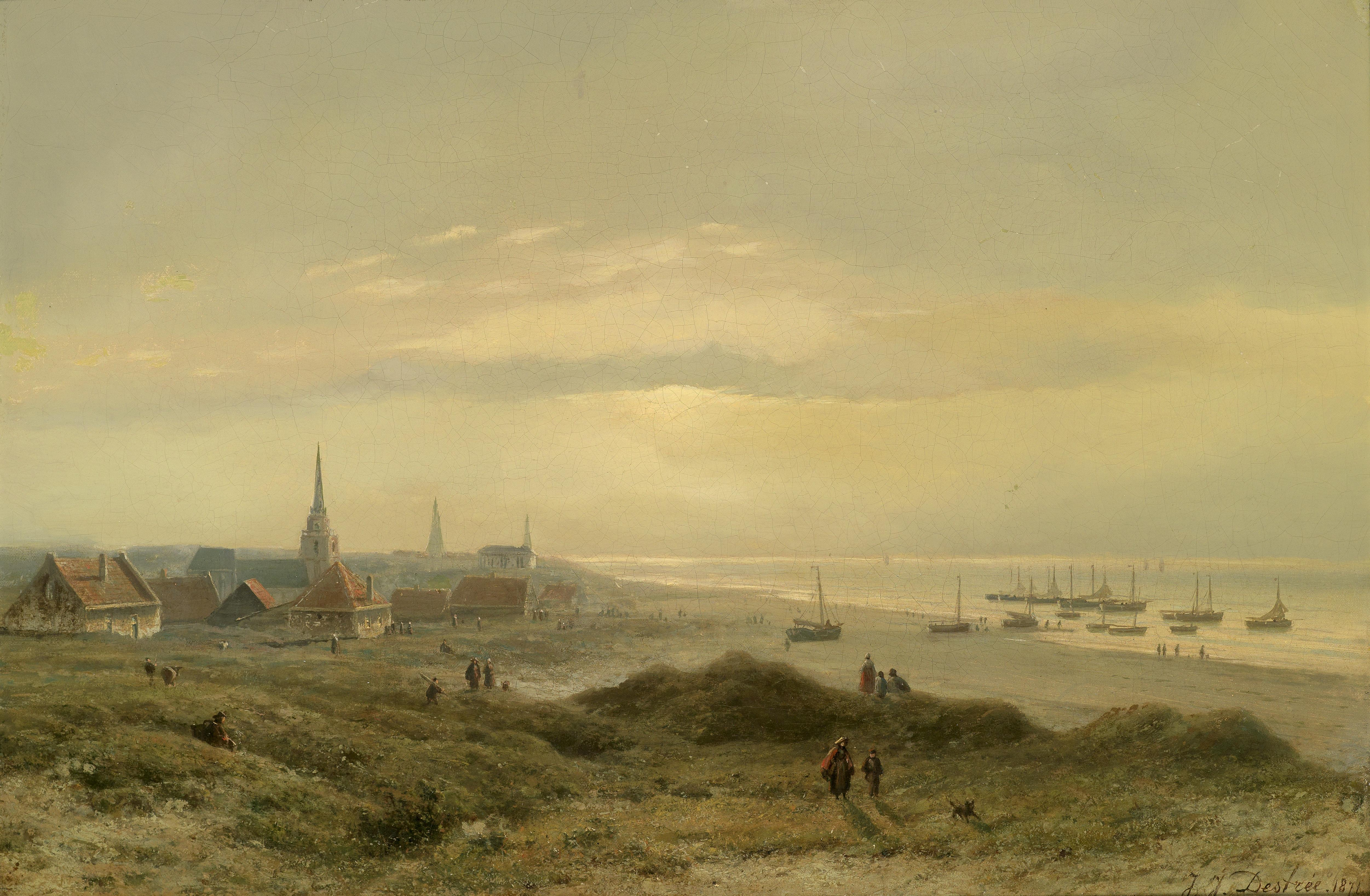
Johannes Joseph Destree: Beach of Scheveningen (1871)

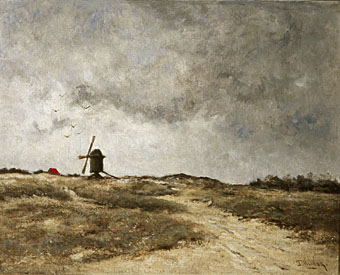
Taco Mesdag: Molentje Leende (1880)

- Anna Adelaïde Abrahams (1849–1930)
- Louis Apol (1850–1936)
- Gerard Bilders (1836–1865)
- Bernardus Johannes Blommers (1845–1904)
- Johannes Bosboom (1817–1891)
- George Hendrik Breitner (1857–1923)
- Johannes Josephus Destrée (1827–1886)
- Johan Hendrik Doeleman (1848–1913)
- Paul Gabriël (1828–1903)
- Arnold Marc Gorter (1866–1937)
- Hendrik Haverman (1857–1928)
- Bartholomeus Johannes van Hove (1790–1880)
- Bramine Hubrecht (1855–1913)
- Jozef Israëls (1827–1919)
- Jan Philip Koelman (1818–1893)
- Johannes Diederikus Kruseman (1835–1895)
- Jacob Maris (1837–1899)
- Willem Maris (1844–1910)
- Anton Mauve (1838–1888)
- Geesje Mesdag-van Calcar (1850–1936)
- Hendrik Willem Mesdag (1831–1915)
- Taco Mesdag (1829–1902)
- Sina van Houten (1834–1909)
- Willem Cornelis Rip (1856–1922)
- Willem Roelofs (1822–1897)
- Julius van de Sande Bakhuyzen (1835–1925)
- Andreas Schelfhout (1787–1870)
- Piet Schipperius (1840–1929)
- Hendrik Jacobus Scholten (1824–1907)
- Jan Sluijters (1881–1957)
- Johannes Gijsbert Vogel (1828–1915)
- Jan Weissenbruch (1822–1880)
- Jan Hendrik Weissenbruch (1824–1903)
- Jan Hillebrand Wijsmuller (1855–1925)

== Gallery ==
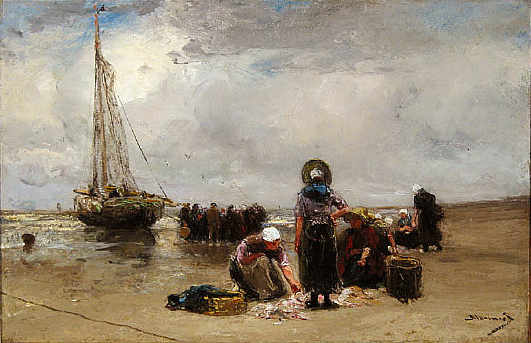
Bernard Blommers (undated): Seaside, Saint Louis Museum, USA.

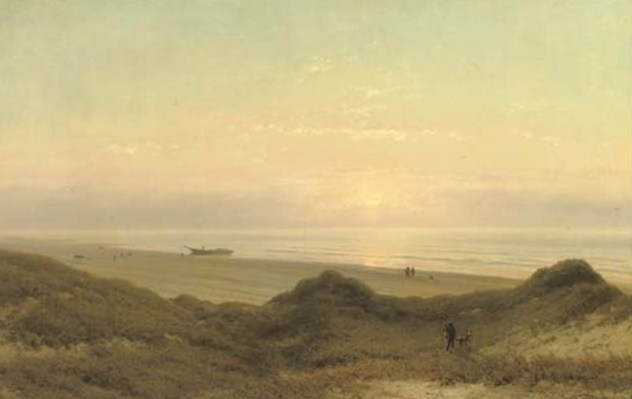
Johannes Josephus Destrée (1873): On the seaside at sunset, private collection.

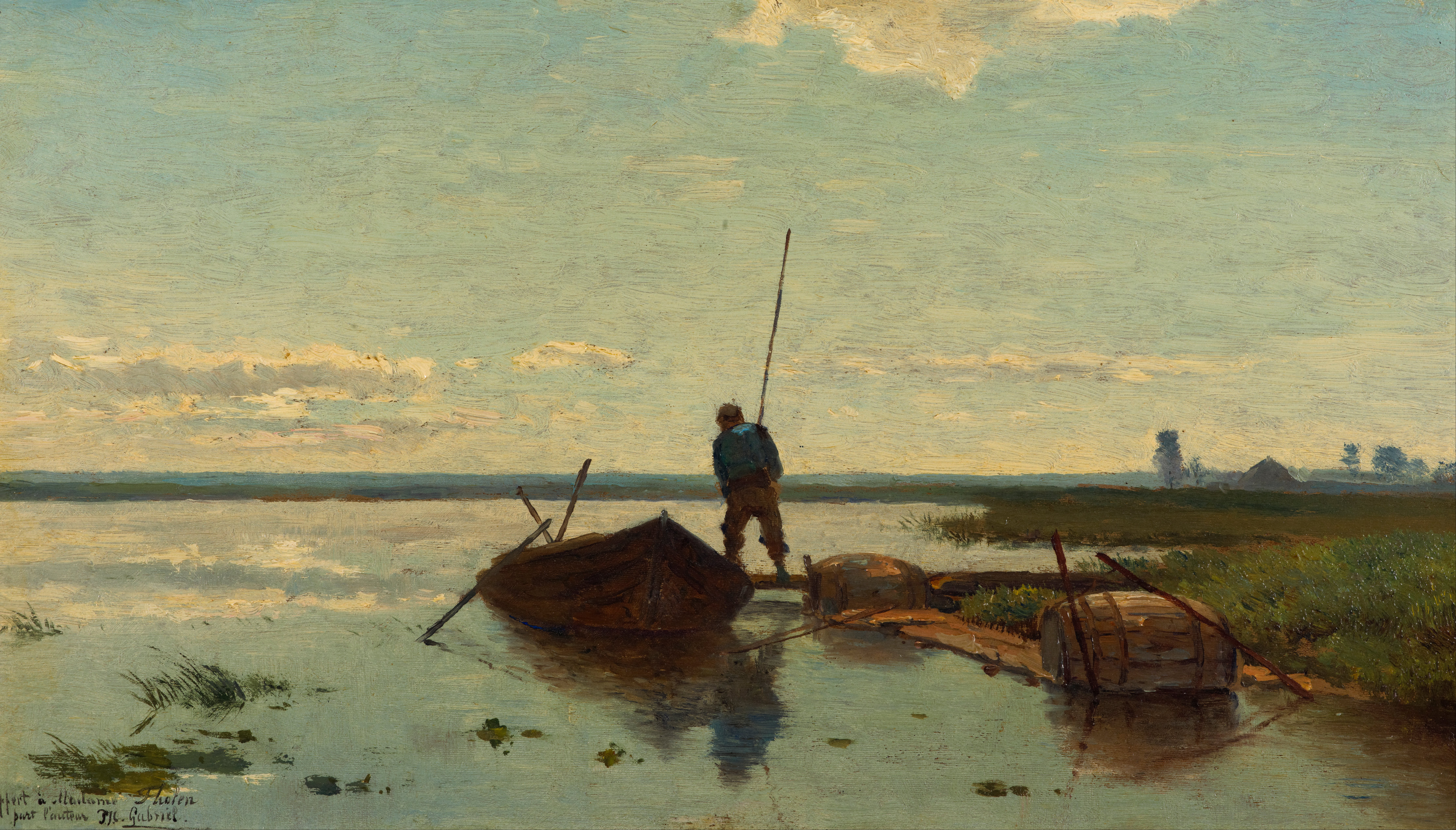
Paul Gabriël (undated): Polder landscape, Gemeentemuseum, The Hague.

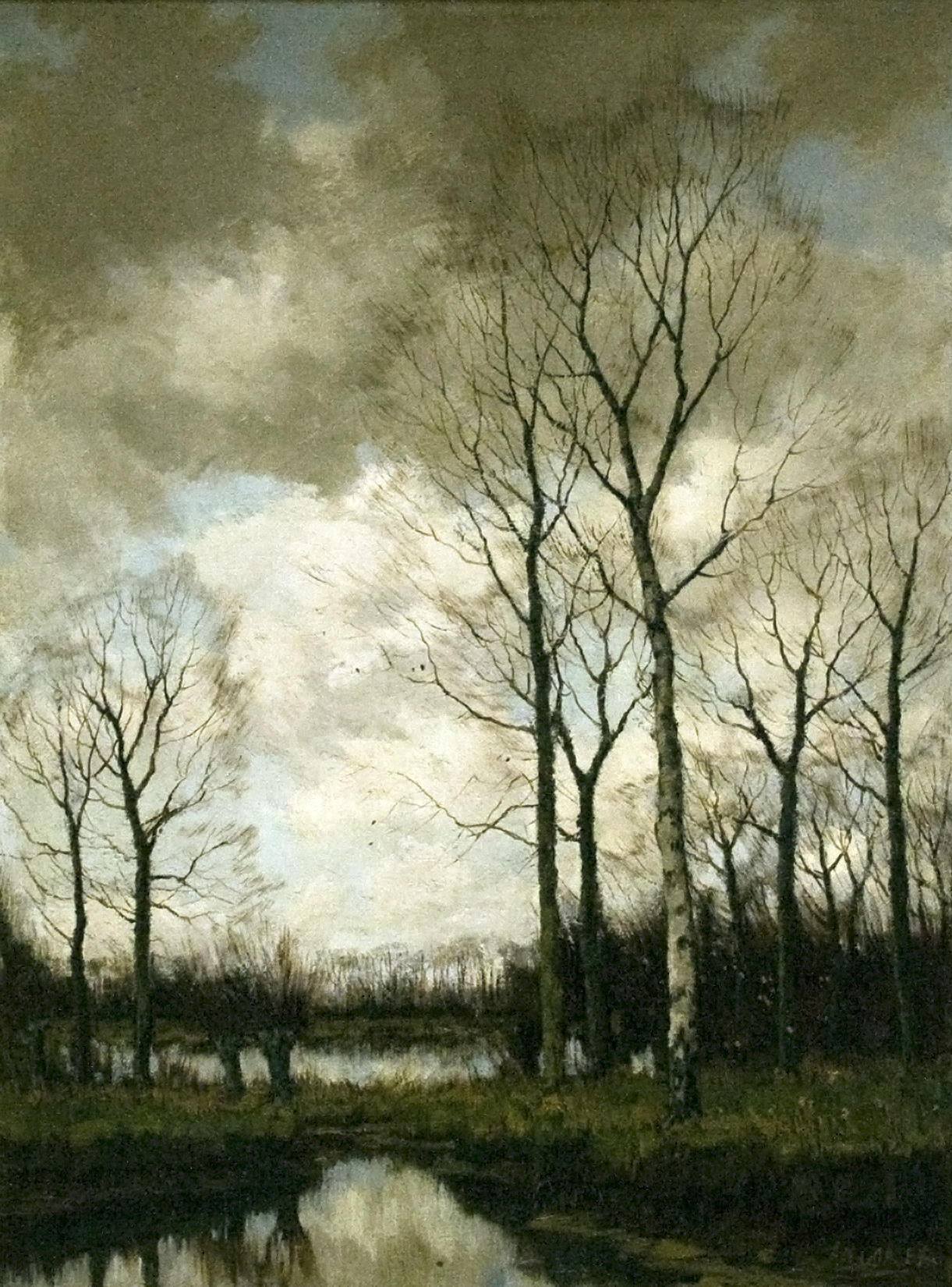
Arnold Marc Gorter (1905): November mood, Teylers Museum, Haarlem.

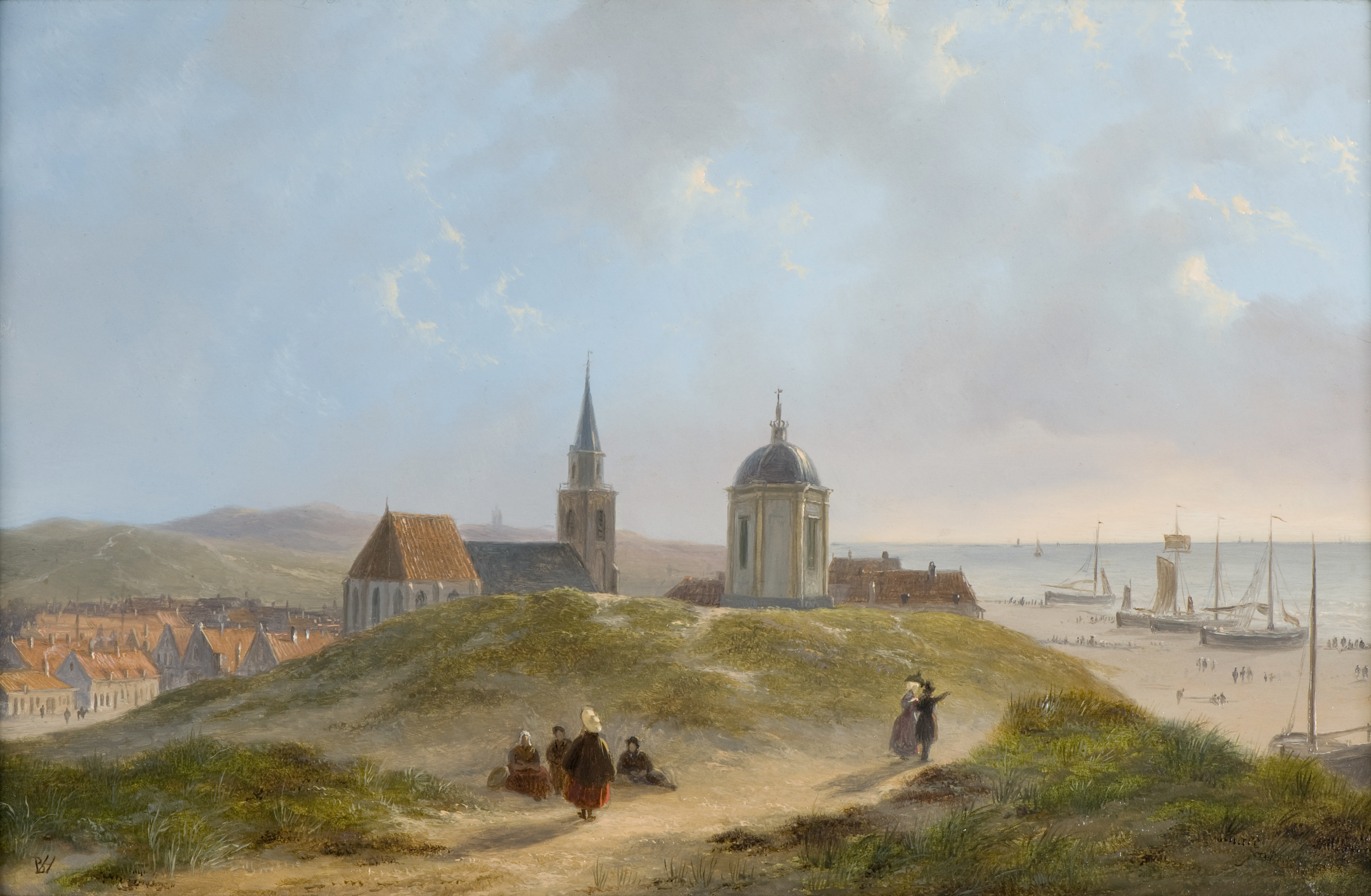
Bartholomeus Johannes van Hove (1825/50): View on Scheveningen, The Hague Historic Museum.

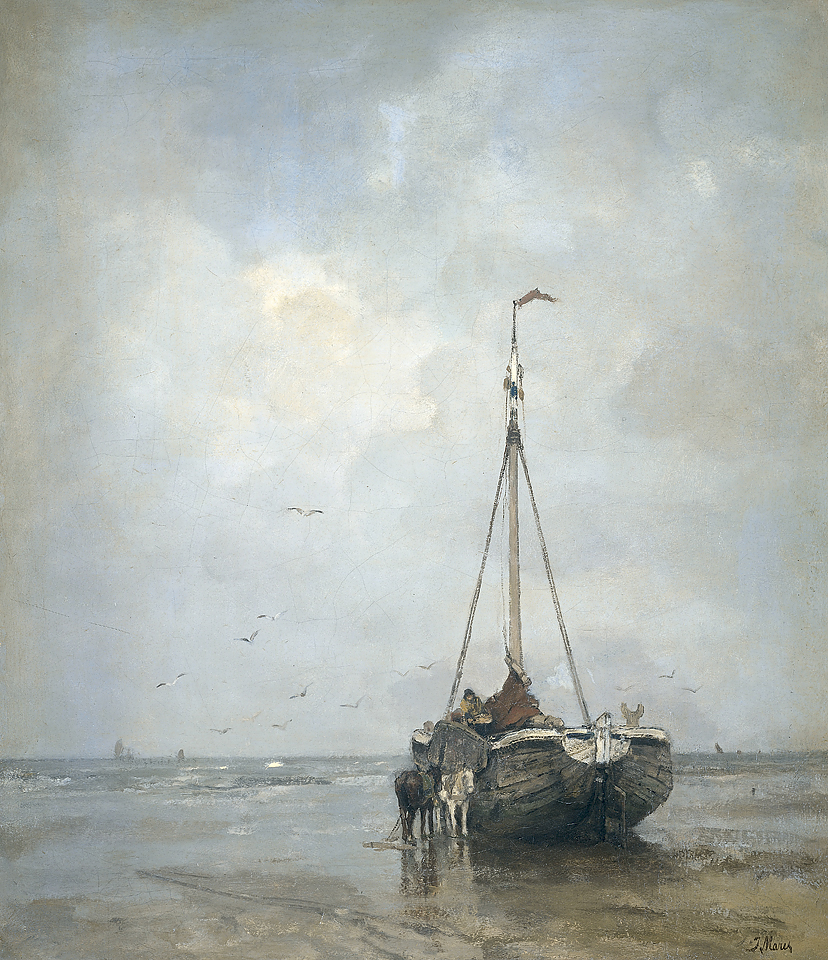
Jacob Maris (1885): Bluff-bowed Fishing boat on the beach at Scheveningen, Rijksmuseum, Amsterdam.

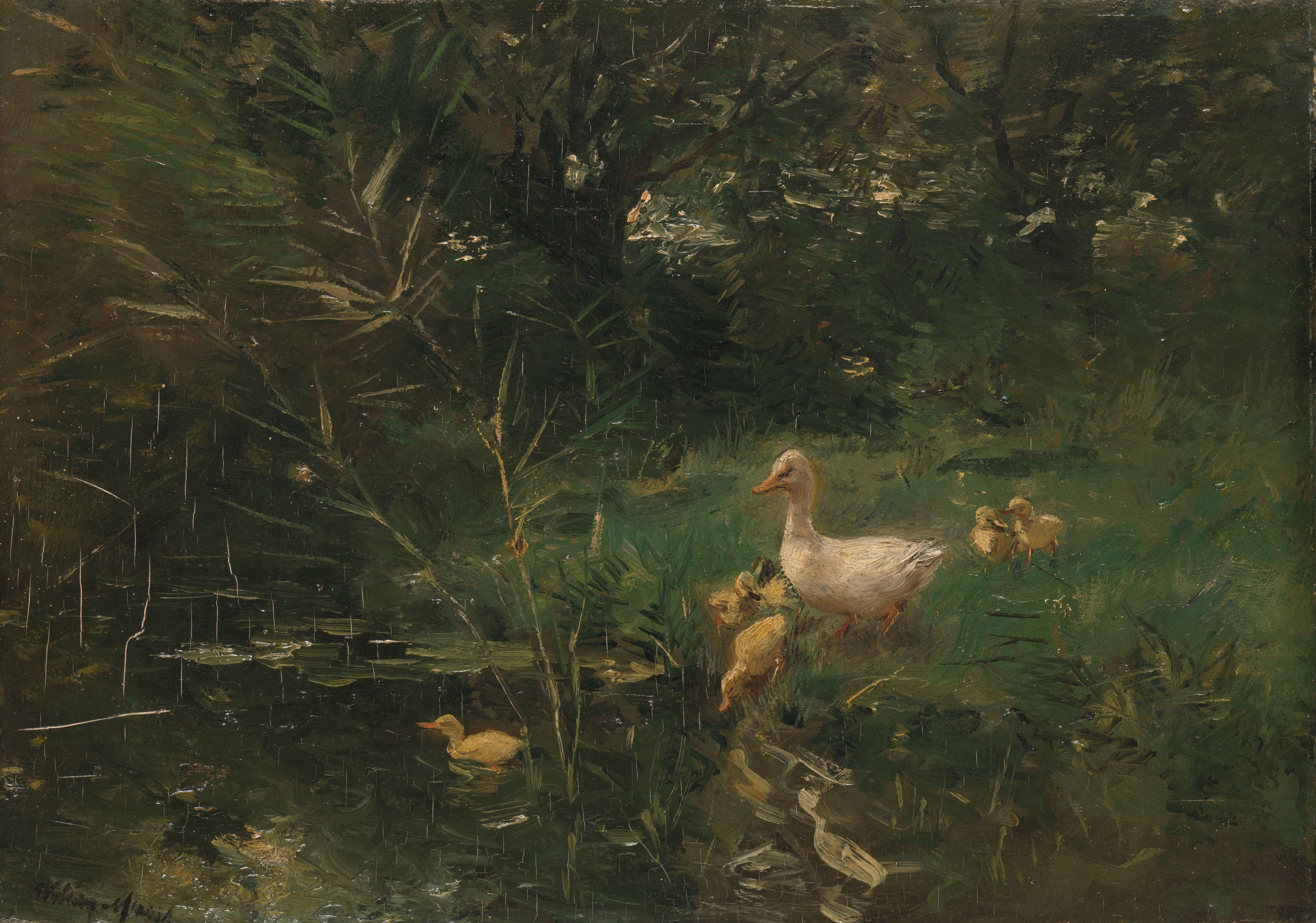
Willem Maris (after 1880): Duck with their ducklings at the shore of the pond, Rijksmuseum, Amsterdam.

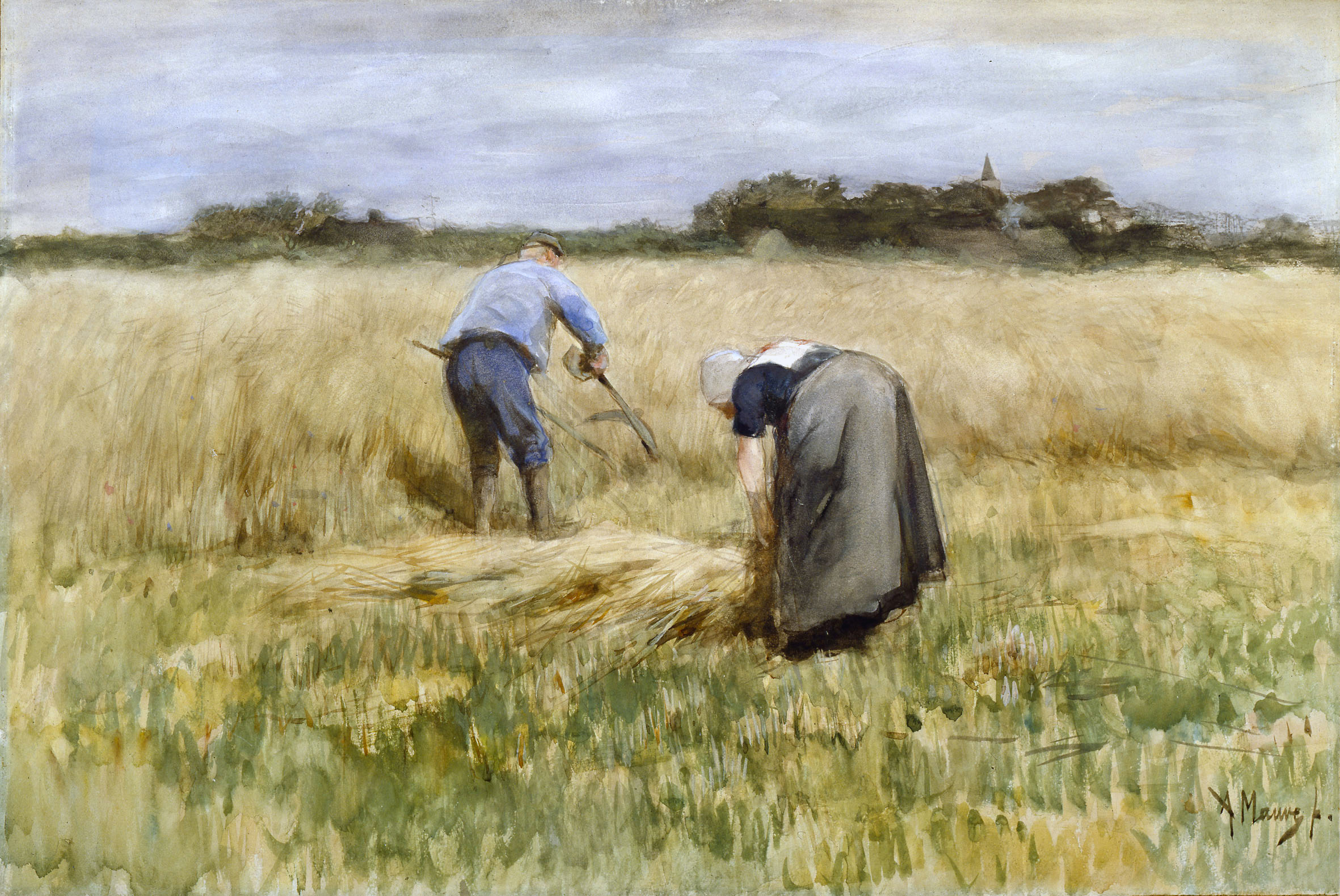
Anton Mauve (undated): The Corn Harvest, Gemeentemuseum, The Hague.

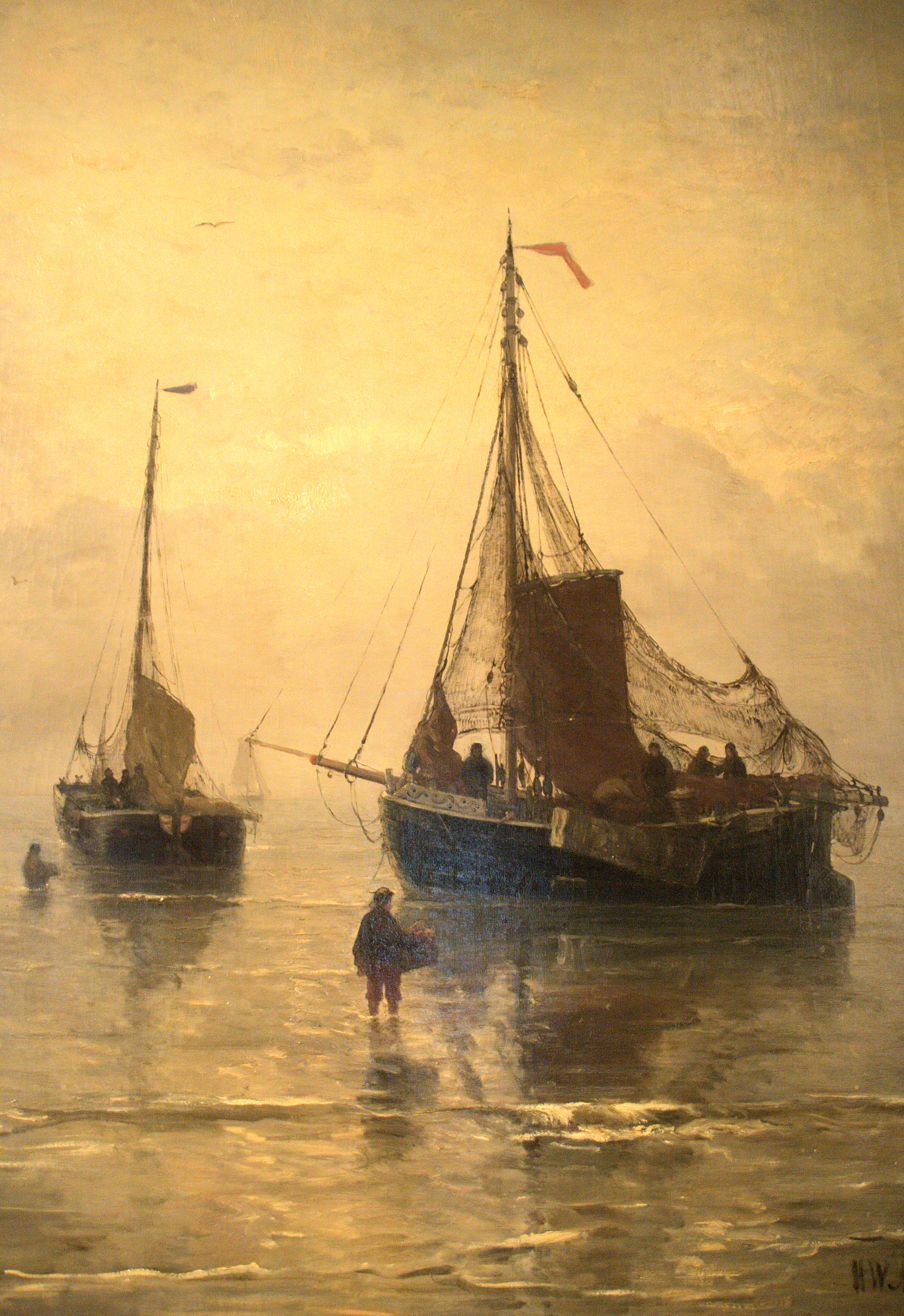
Hendrik Willem Mesdag (1875): Return from fishing, Visserijmuseum.

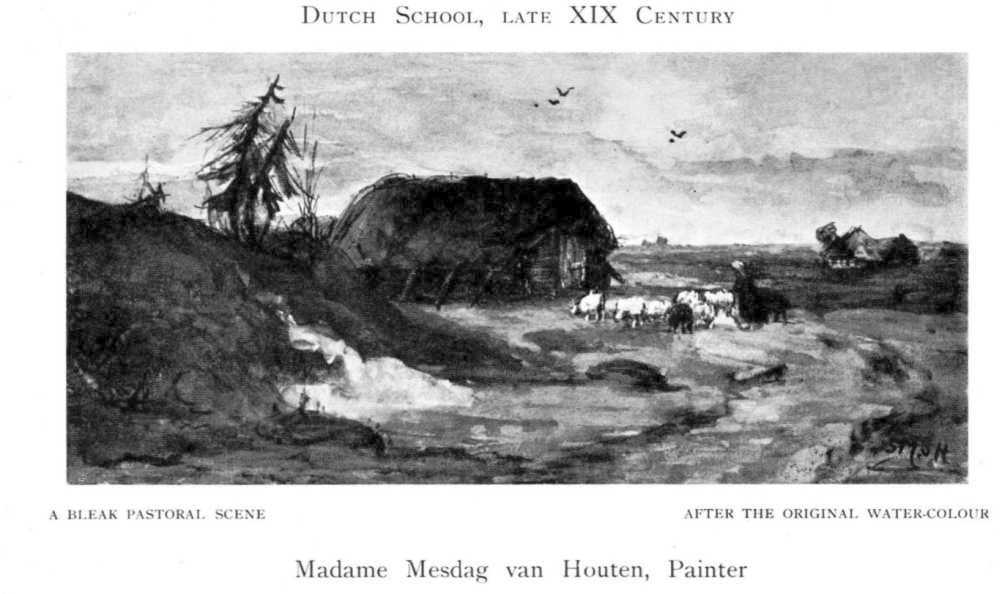
Sina Mesdag van Houten (1905): Bleak Pastoral Scene, Water-Colour Serie as part of the Series of the Dutch School.

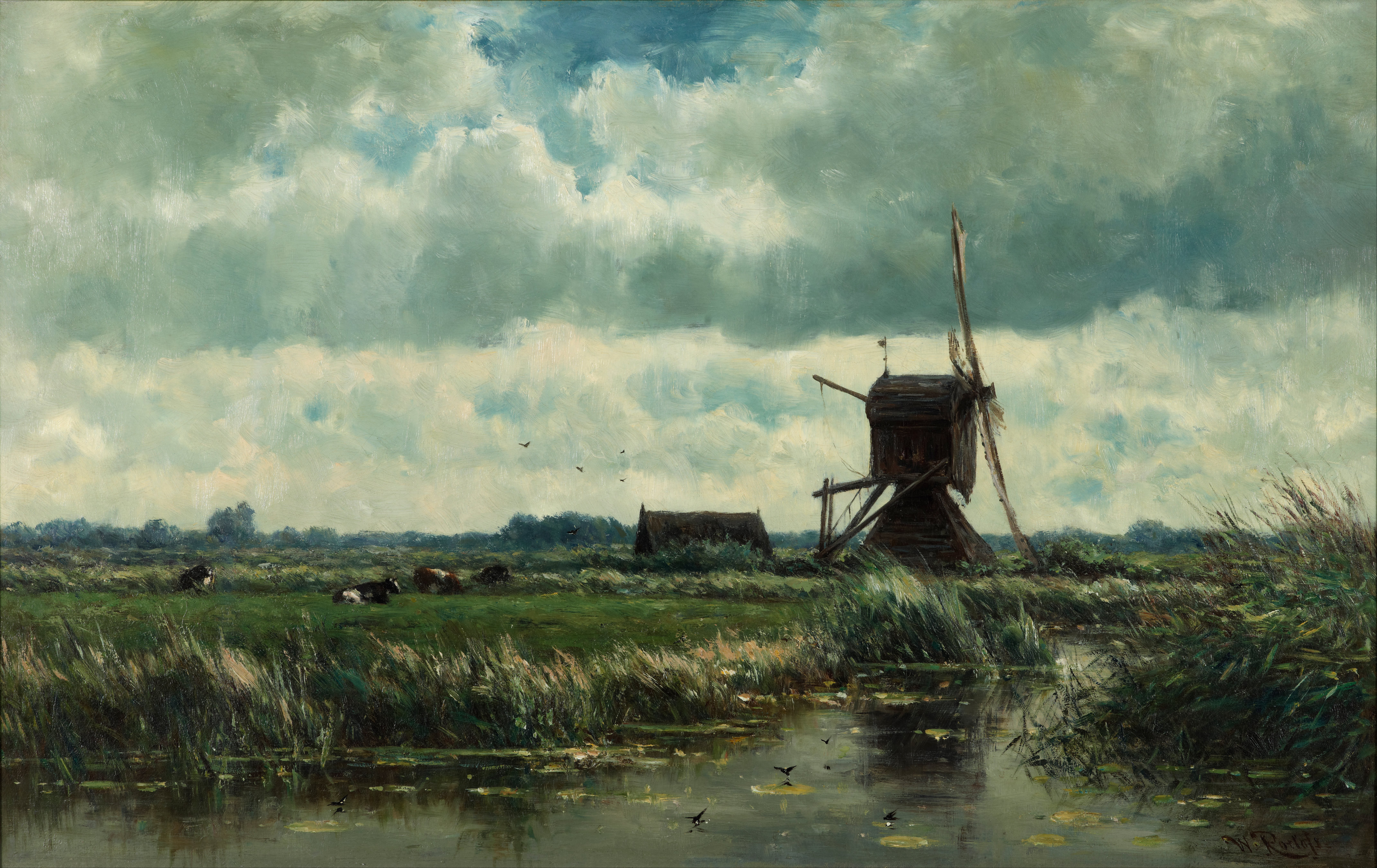
Willem Roelofs (1870): Polder landscape with windmill near Abcoude, Geementemuseum, The Hague.

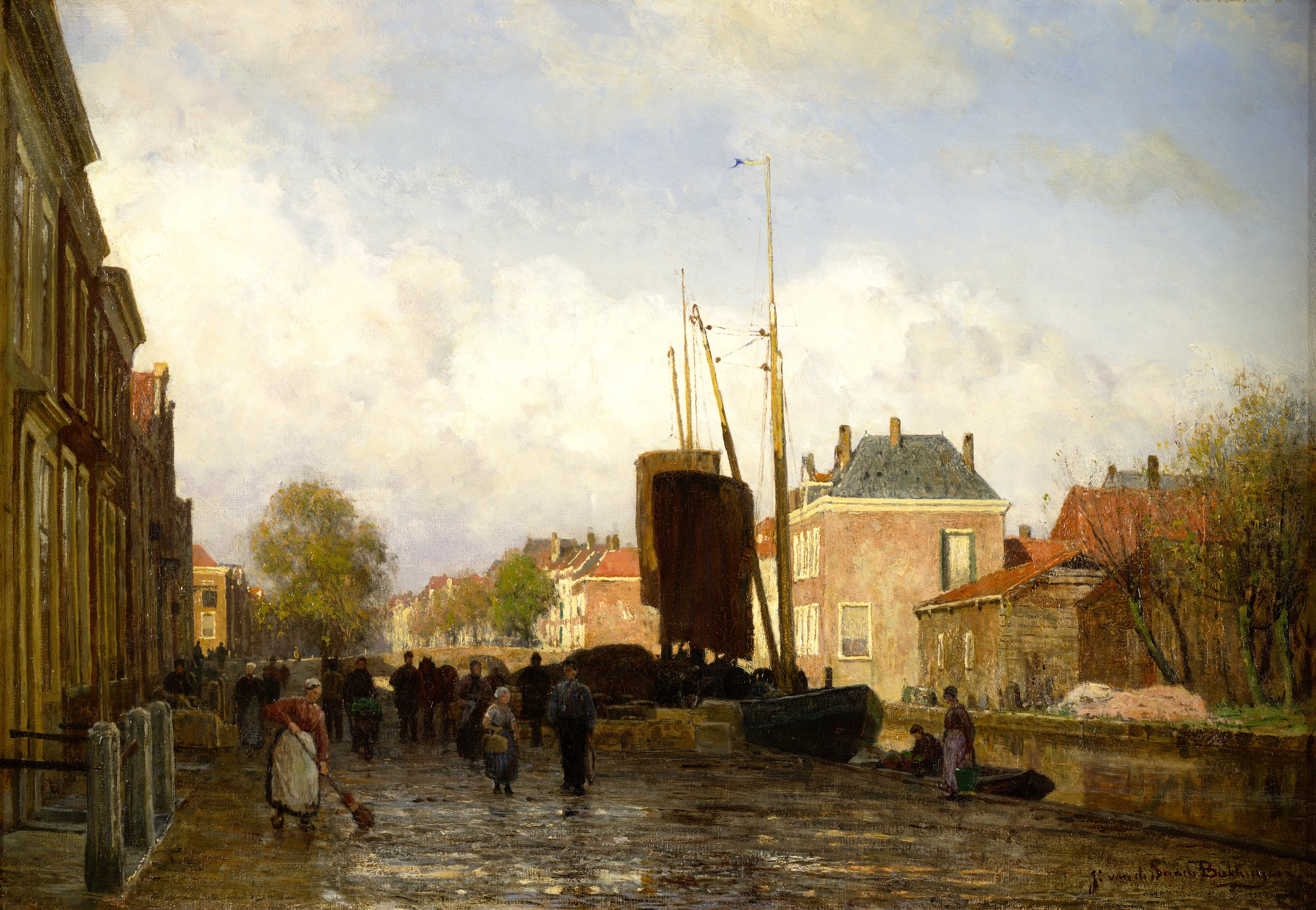
Julius van de Sande Bakhuyzen (1870): The Hospital at 's-Gravenhage (The Hague), Teylers Museum.

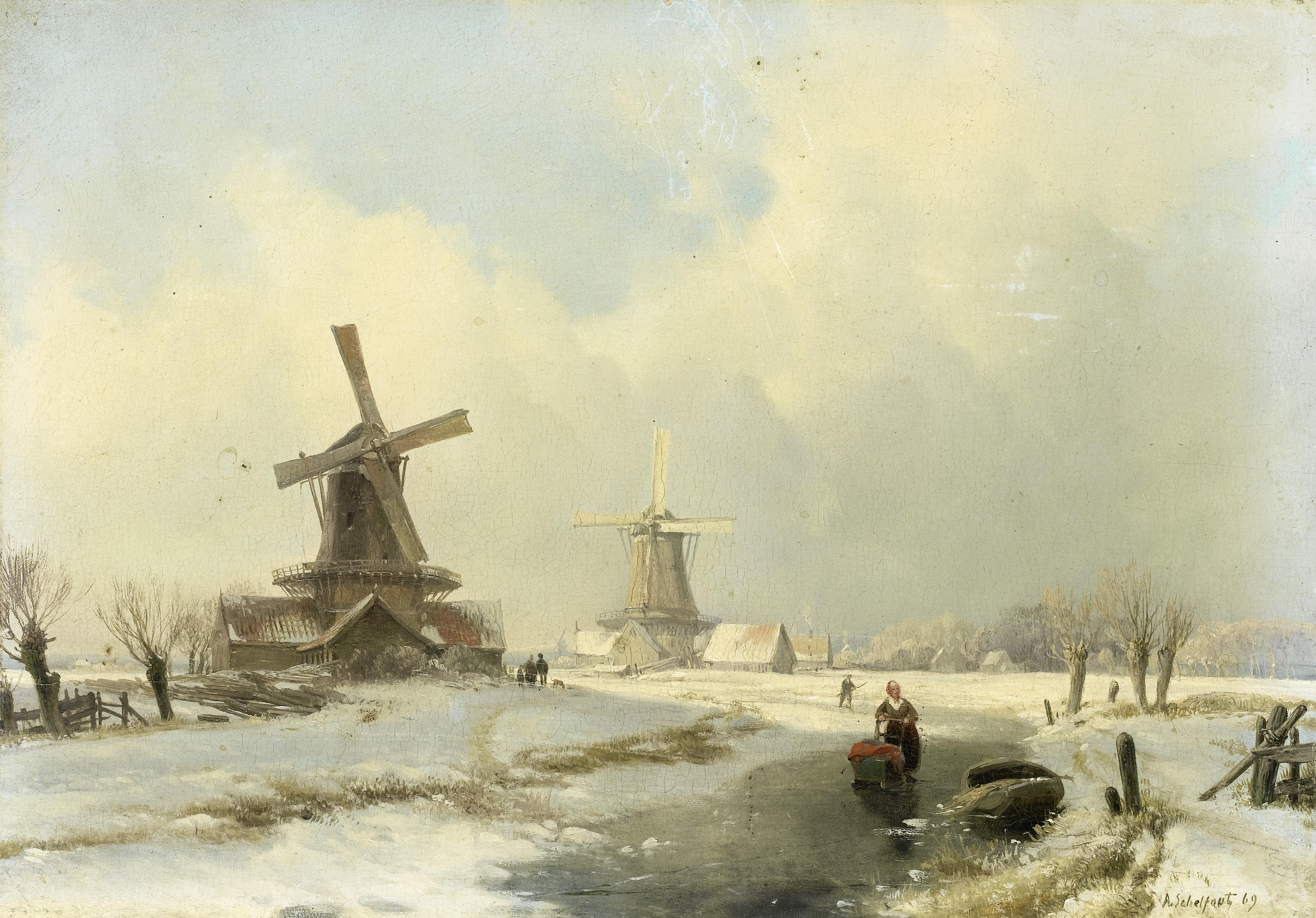
Andreas Schelfhout (1869): Winterlandscape with two windmills, private collection.

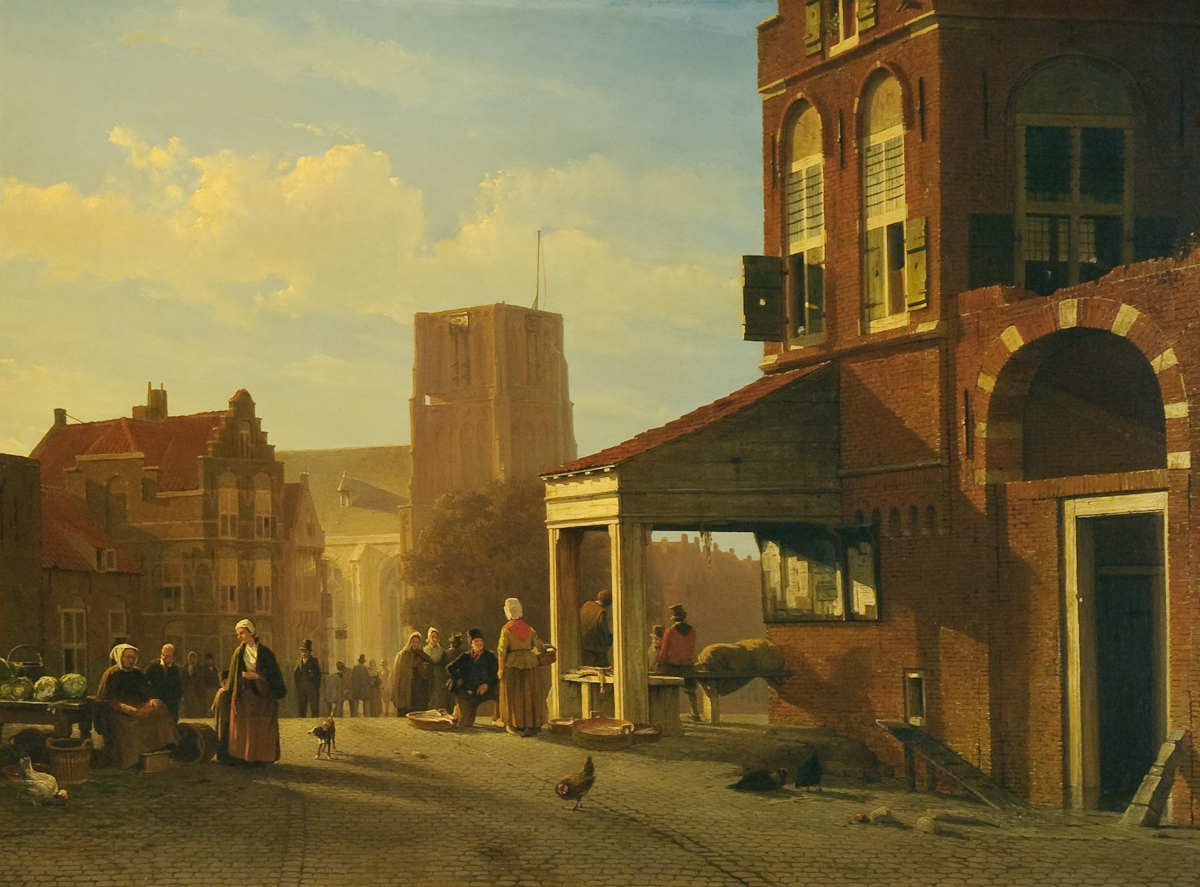
Jan Weissenbruch (1850): The fishmarket at Woudrichem, private collection.

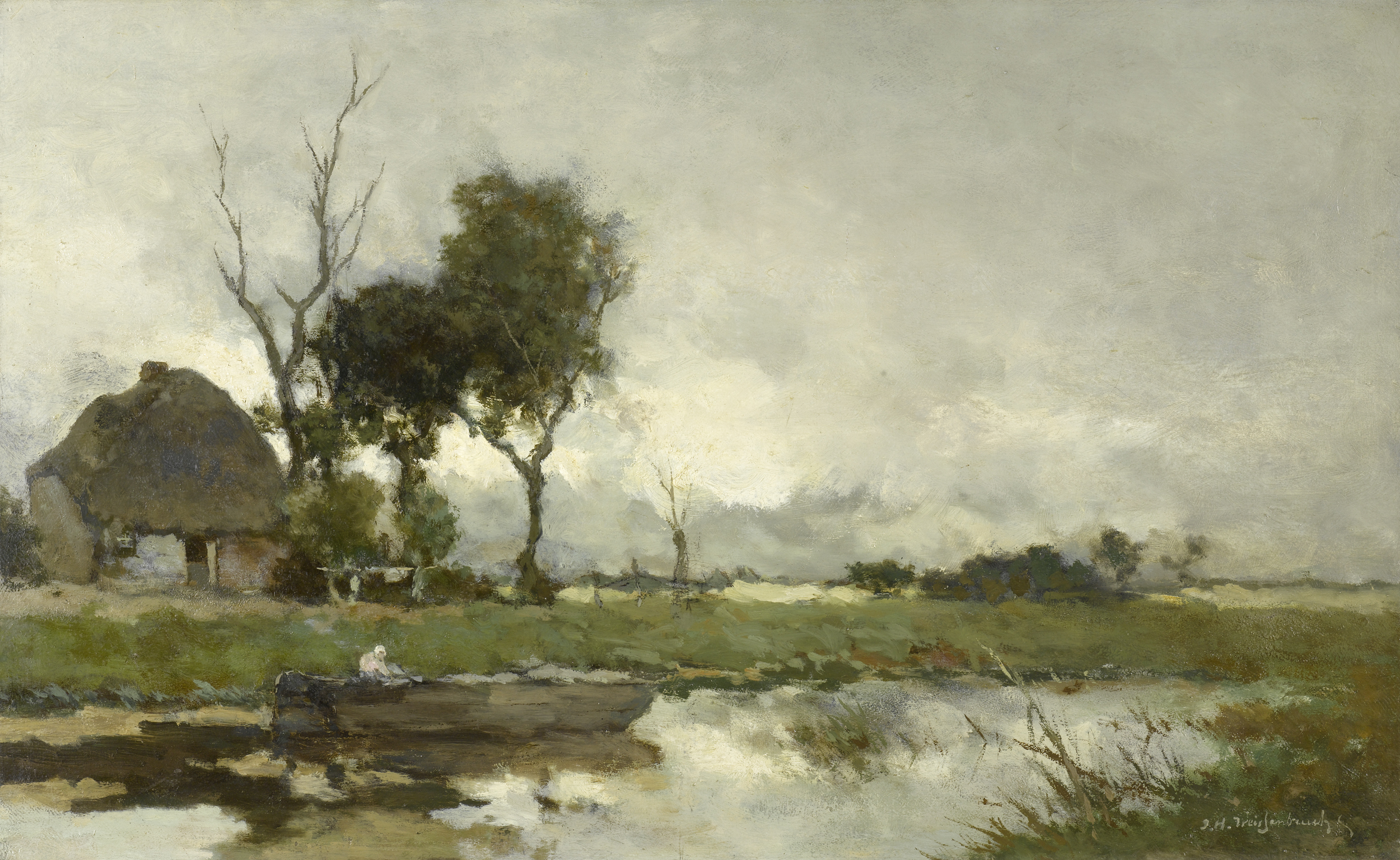
Jan Hendrik Weissenbruch (after 1870): Autumn landscape, Rijksmuseum, Amsterdam.

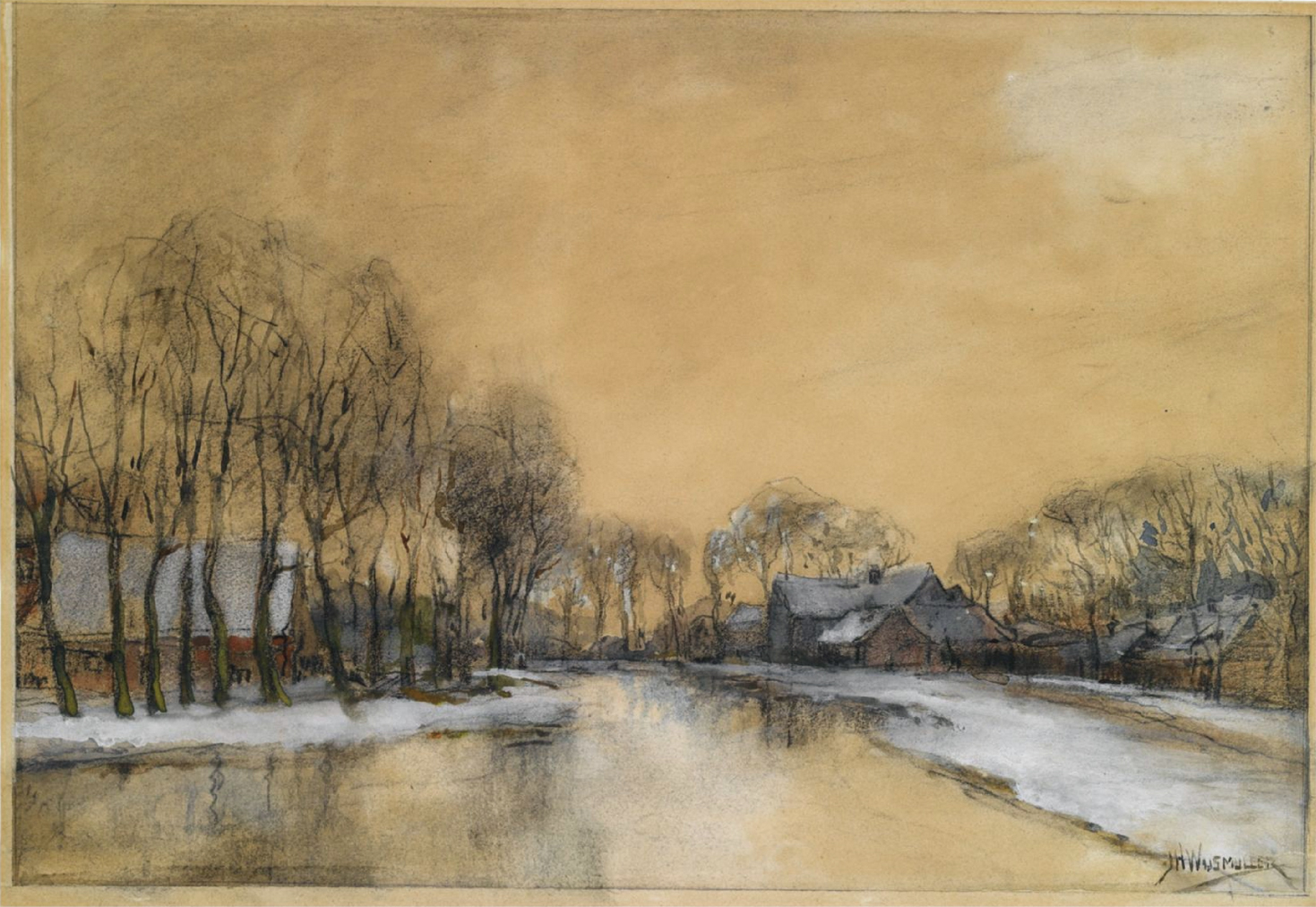
Jan Hillebrand Wijsmuller (undated): A winter landscape with houses along a canal, private collection.

== Revival after the war ==
After the Second World War was Pulchri Studio in disrepute: In 1943, the executive committee had submitted the order from Berlin to join the Reich-Chamber of Culture (Reichskulturkammer). In the Kingdom of the Netherlands this act was regarded as an act of collaboration. – After 1945 the chairman at that time, Willy Sluiter, was dismissed. In 1996 Queen Beatrix just took the patronage of this artists association and helped her back to the traditional reputation and importance in the art scene of The Hague and the Netherlands.

== Notable members: 20th century ==
- Johannes Evert Hendrik Akkeringa
- Kees Andrea
- Lizzy Ansingh
- Floris Arntzenius
- Marius Bauer
- Hermanus Berserik
- Theo Bitter
- Loek Bos
- Dirk Bus
- Paul Citroen
- Ko Cossaar
- Nelly van Doesburg
- Lotti van der Gaag
- Arnold Marc Gorter
- Hendrik Haverman
- Vilmos Huszár
- Aart van den IJssel
- Harm Kamerlingh Onnes
- Arnold Hendrik Koning
- Han Krug
- Kees Maks
- Herman Mees
- W.O.J. Nieuwenkamp
- Frans Oerder
- Louis Raemaekers
- Coba Ritsema
- Jan Roëde
- Bram Roth
- Lique Schoot
- Jan Sluijters
- Willy Sluiter
- Albert Termote
- Willem Bastiaan Tholen
- Cornelis Vreedenburgh
- Co Westerik
- Willem de Zwart

== Bibliography ==
- Broude, Norma (1990: World Impressionism: The International Movement — 1860–1920, Harry N. Abrams, inc. ISBN 0-8109-1774-2.
- Bley, Britta (2004): Vom Staat zur Nation: Zur Rolle der Kunst bei der Herausbildung eines Niederländischen Nationalbewußtseins im langen 19. Jahrhundert. LIT-Verlag, Münster, (in German Language), ISBN 3-8258-7902-X.
- Dom, Ronald (1996): Van Gogh und die Haager Schule. Ausst.-Kat. Wien, (in German Language), ISBN 88-8118-072-3.
- Roland Holst, Richard (1917): Hollandsche Teekenmaatschappij Pulchri Studio. 1917.
- De Leeuw, Ronald; Sillevis, John and Dumas, Charles (1983): The Hague School, Dutch Masters of the 19th Century. — Exhibition-Catalogue, Weidenfeld and Nicolson, London, ISBN 0-297-78069-7.
- Van Druten, Terry; Van Dijk, Maite and Sillevis, John (2005): De aquarel – Nederlandse meesters van de negentiende eeuw. THOT, Teylers Museum und De Mesdag Collectie, Bussum 2015, ISBN 978-90-6868-673-9.
- Tholen, Willem Bastian (1914): Hollandsche Teekenmaatschappij. The Hague 1914.
- Stolwijk, Chris (1998): Uit de Schilderswereld, Primavera Pers-Leiden, Leiden, ISBN 978-9074-310352.
