= Jan Hendrik Doeleman =

Dutch painter

Johan Hendrik Doeleman
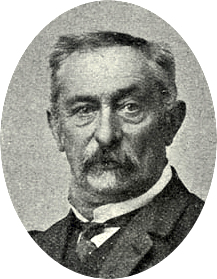
- Johan Hendrik Doeleman
- Born: 5 March 1848; Rotterdam, Netherlands
- Died: 10 May 1913 (aged 65); Voorburg, Netherlands
- Occupations: Painter, drawer

Johan Hendrik Doeleman (5 March 1848 – 10 May 1913) was a Dutch lecturer, painter, draughtsman, watercolourist and impressionist.

== Biography ==
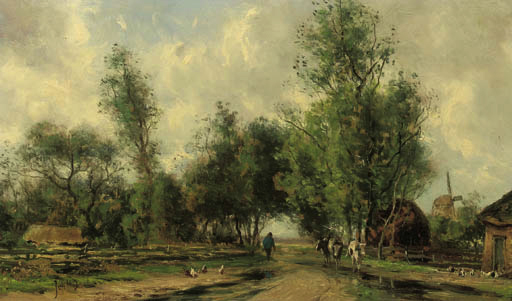
The village of Rolde in Drenthe

Doeleman was born on 5 March 1848 in Rotterdam, Netherlands. He married Josina Christina Cornelia Wierikx on 29 October 1874 in Rotterdam. He died on 10 May 1913 in Voorburg, Netherlands.

== Career ==
Doeleman studied at the Academie van Beeldende Kunsten en Technische Wetenschappen in Rotterdam in 1877. In the beginning he lived and worked near Haastrecht in the Netherlands but in 1899 he moved to The Hague. He painted mainly seascapes and woodland. Occasionally he worked together with the Hague School painters such as Willem Maris and then produced almost identical works of art, for instance ducks.

Doeleman produced oils and watercolours. He was also admired as an impressionist. He was granted the membership of Pulchri Studio, the artist's club in The Hague. In 1902 he was given an honorary membership of the Academy in Rotterdam.

The Valkhof Museum in Nijmegen, the Zeeuws Museum in Middelburg and the Historic Museum in Deventer exhibit his work. Leo Oosthout was one of his pupils. Exhibitions of his works were held in The Hague and Amsterdam between 1872 and 1903.
