= Pat Andrea =

Dutch contemporary painter and sculptor

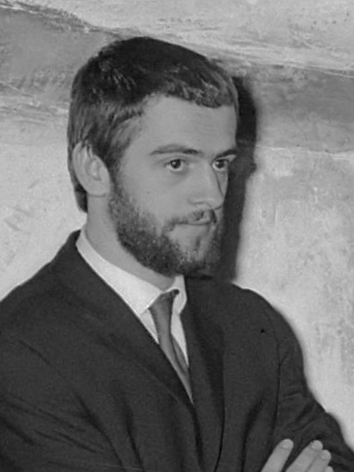
- Pat Andrea in 1964
- Born: 25 June 1942 (age 83); The Hague, Netherlands
- Education: Royal Academy of Art, The Hague
- Known for: Painting, sculpture
- Movement: New Hague School
- Awards: Jacob Marisprijs; Koninklijke Prijs

Pat Andrea (born 1942) is a Dutch contemporary painter and sculptor. He is one of the representatives of the New Subjectivity.

== Biography ==
Pat Andrea was born in 1942 in The Hague, Netherlands. He is the son of the illustrator Metty Naezer and the painter Kees Andrea.

From 1960 to 1965, Pat Andrea studied at the Royal Academy of Art, The Hague, where he was a student of the painter Co Westerik. Along with Walter Nobbe and Peter Blokhuis, he founded the ABN Group (from their initials: A ndrea, B lokhuis, N obbe ). They came to be associated with the Nieuwe Haagse School.

In 1977, Jean Clair invited him to participate in the exhibition La nouvelle subjectivité in the Paris Fall Festival, along with Jim Dine, David Hockney, R. B. Kitaj, Raymond Mason, and Olivier O. Olivier.

He traveled to Latin America and settled in Buenos Aires, where he remained for several years. From 1989 he started to make sculptures in bronze.

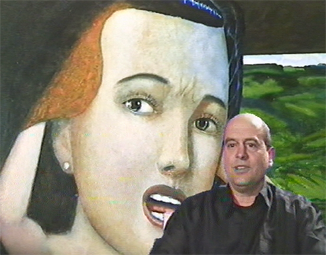
The artist and his work, 1995

Pat Andrea teaches at the Ecole des Beaux-Arts in Paris.

Locating himself between Francis Bacon and Balthus ("entre Bacon et Balthus"), Pat Andrea has developed a figurative painting style depicting an ambiguous and murky universe.

== Distinctions ==
In 1964 Andrea won the Jacob Maris Prize (Jacob Marisprijs) for drawing and in 1971 received the Royal Prize for Painting (Koninklijke Prijs voor Vrije Schilderkunst).

In 2002 he was elected a corresponding member of the Académie des Beaux-Arts of the Institut de France.

== Exhibitions ==
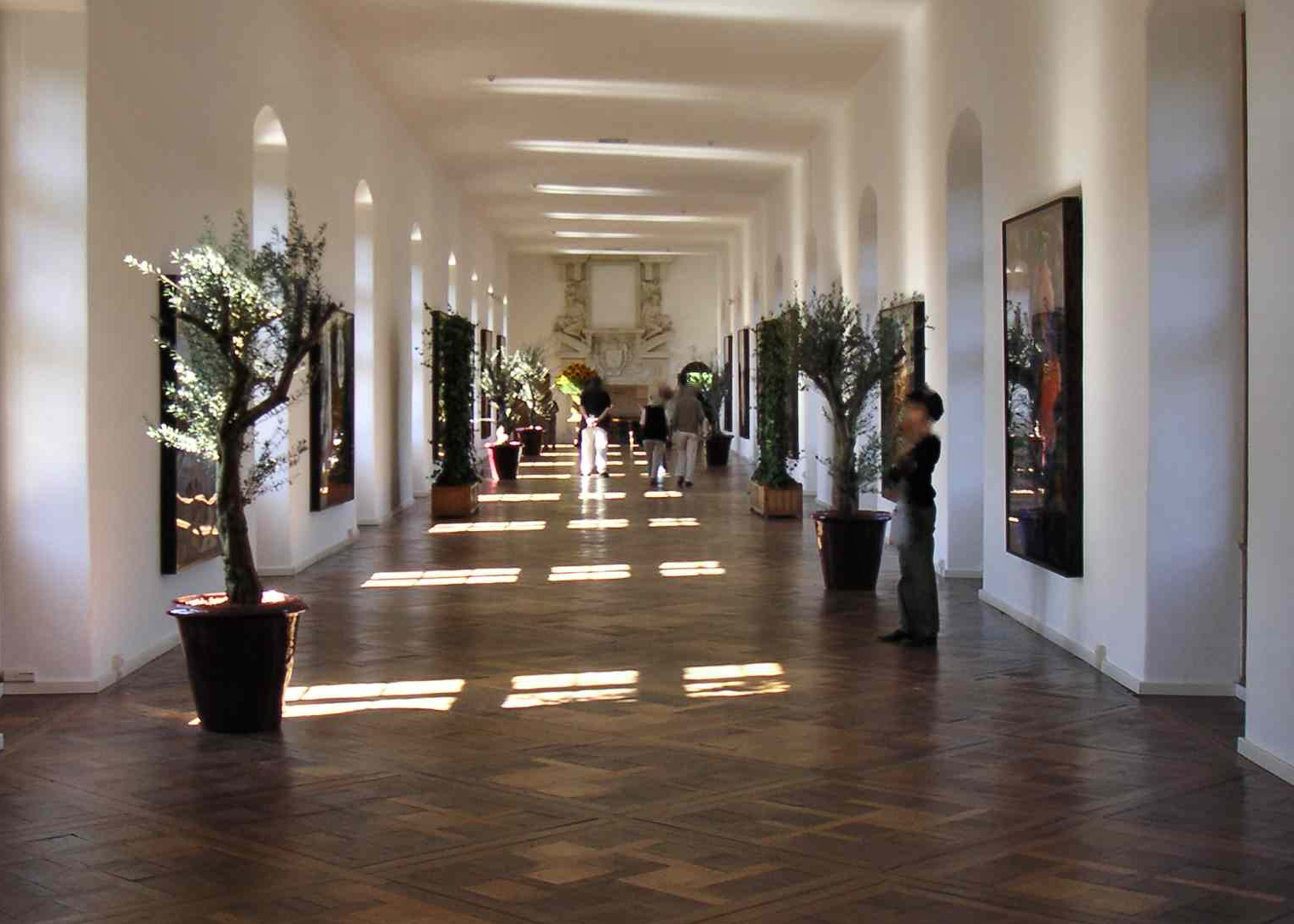
Exhibition Hall of the Château de Chenonceau, where he presented his works in 2007

From June to September 2007 he presented 48 paintings illustrating the works of Lewis Carroll at the Château de Chenonceau. This was the result of an editorial collaboration with Diane de Selliers. The same collection could be seen in the Santa Monica Art Centre, Barcelona, in 2010.

His paintings can be seen in the Victor Saavedra Gallery, Barcelona. His work is represented by the Bertrand Delacroix Gallery in the United States.

== Other work ==
Pat Andrea designed the cover for the Dutch train schedule for the year 1979/1980, depicting Rembrandt with a startled expression, painting a train.
