= Frans Schrofer =

Dutch furniture designer

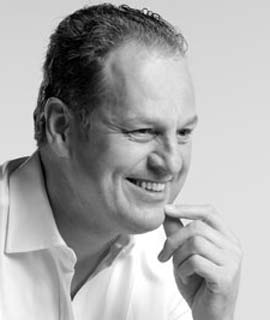
- Schrofer, 2012
- Born: August 15, 1956 (age 70); Voorburg
- Education: Design Academy Eindhoven
- Occupations: Furniture Designer; Product designer
- Years active: 1984–present
- Known for: Caruzzo (for Leolux); Scudo chair (for Young International); Formi (for Leolux); Prometheus and OlympiQ firespace (for Safretti)
- Style: Sculptural, practical
- Parents: Willem Schrofer (father); Hannie Bal (mother)
- Relatives: Jurriaan Schrofer (half-brother)
- Website: www.studioschrofer.com

Frans Schrofer (born 15 August 1956) is a Dutch furniture designer and industrial designer based in The Hague, Netherlands. He received a technical education in Leiden and then studied at the Design Academy Eindhoven, graduating in 1983 and founding his own design studio, Studio Schrofer, in 1984.

== Education and early career ==
Schrofer's early education included metalwork, auto mechanics, electro-mechanics and mechanical engineering. From the age of 12, Schrofer was mentored by the sculptor, Frans de Wit. During this time the young Schrofer acted as de Wit's artistic assistant, developing an awareness of sculptural style in the process. "Frans de Wit taught me to focus on form, materials and emotions," Schrofer said in an interview in 1995. After his technical education in Leiden, he went on to study at the Design Academy Eindhoven, graduating in 1983. After graduation, Schrofer's first job was as a packaging designer with Stadium Design in Hillegom.

In 1984 Schrofer set up his own design studio in The Hague, Netherlands. Studio Schrofer received its first commission from the Dutch firm, Young International, an association that would last for several, productive years and bring Schrofer widespread recognition as a rising young talent in the Netherlands. By 2000, Schrofer designs in lighting, office furniture, and indoor and outdoor furniture were being sold internationally. As of 2012, Studio Schrofer designed products sell in 126 countries.

== Lighting and other works ==
Early on in his career, Schrofer's created several lighting designs (for Dutch firm, Scopelight, and Indoor of Amsterdam) including the Plume (1990), a lamp whose metal components were so intricate that the precision engineering skills of instrument makers had to be used for manufacture.

Schrofer has also designed glassware, tables, storage cabinets and a chess set.

== Family background ==
Schrofer was raised in Voorschoten, Netherlands, into a family of artists. Frans' father, Willem Schrofer, was a teacher at the Royal Academy of Art and the founder of the Nieuwe Haagse School movement. His mother, Hannie Bal, was a student at the Academy and later a member of the Verve group. His uncle, Jan Schrofer, was the founder of the furniture factory, The Circle (later to become the market leader, Ahrend), in Zwanenberg, Netherlands and was renowned for his collaboration with Friso Kramer in the development of the Revolt chair. Frans' half brother, Jurriaan Schrofer, was a renowned graphic designer and the Director of the Art Academy in Arnhem. Jurriaan's son, Gilian Schrofer, established both Concrete, an architecture agency in Amsterdam, and the Schrofer Academie, the only accredited Interior Design Masters program in Europe. Schrofer's cousin, Janwillem, was the Director of the Rijks Academy from 1983–2010.

== Personal life ==
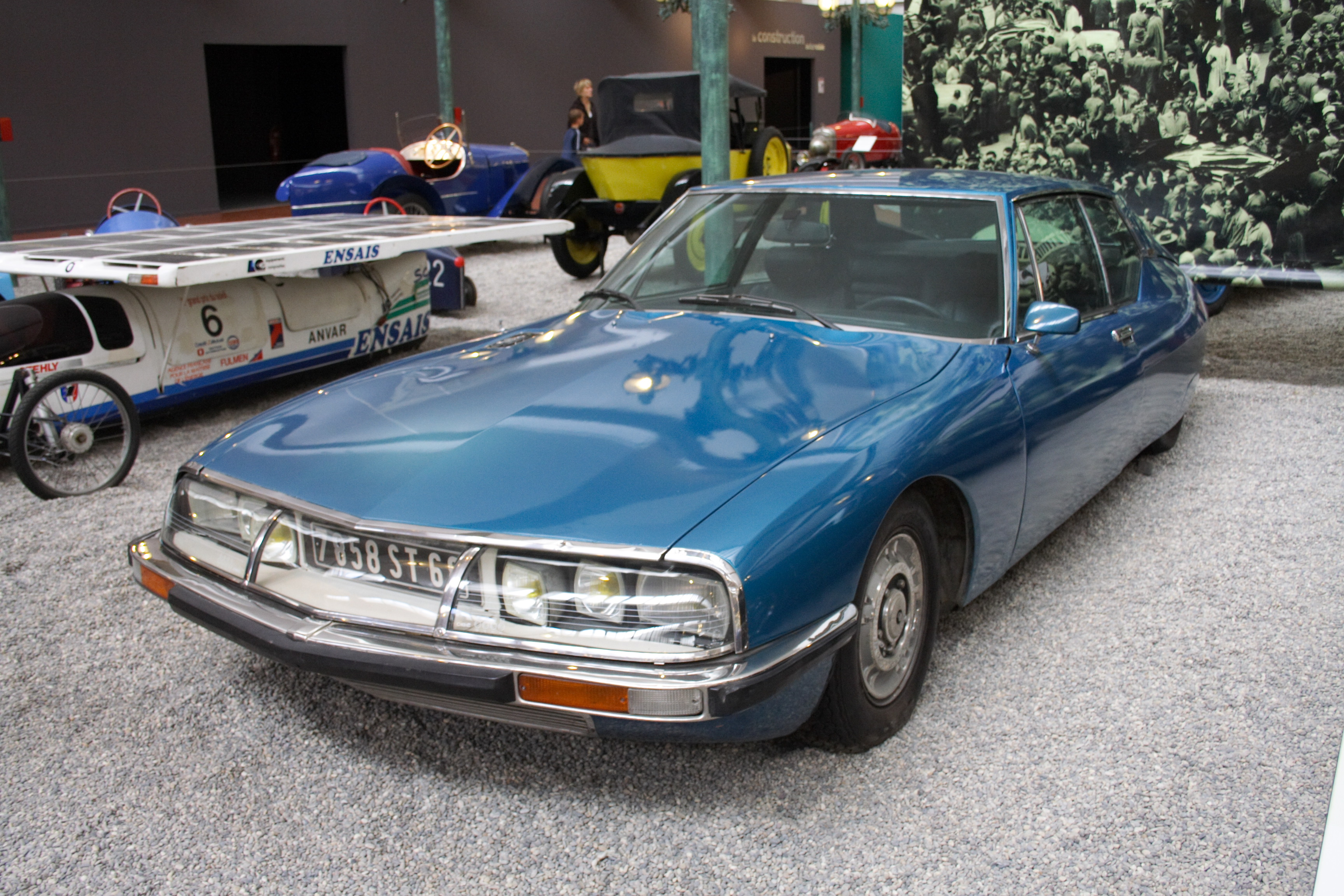
Citroën SM headlights

Schrofer lives in The Hague, Netherlands. He is married to Sonia Sin and has two daughters. Schrofer owns a Citroën SM Maserati and is an auto racing enthusiast. According to Schrofer, "Car designers have always been trend setters ... they use more and more expressive, organic forms. Look, for instance, at the integration of the headlights in the hood. I believe that furniture design will follow this curvy trend."

== See also ==
- Ecodesign
- Emotional Design by Donald Norman
- Furniture design
- Sustainable design
