= Willem Schrofer =

Dutch painter

- Born: 6 March 1898; The Hague, Netherlands
- Died: 22 September 1968 (aged 70); Leiden, Netherlands
- Movement: New Hague School
- Spouse: Hannie Bal
- Children: Jurriaan Schrofer; Frans Schrofer

Willem Schrofer (6 March 1898 – 22 September 1968) was a Dutch art teacher and painter. His vision influenced the Nieuwe Haagse School movement.

== Life ==
His father was a cabinet maker, appointed by Princess von Wied as Superintendent of the Pavilion von Wied in Scheveningen, where his parents lived.

Young Schrofer was obsessed with drawing. In 1913 he attended the National Training College in Nijmegen. Later he studied drawing at the Royal Academy of Art, The Hague. William Henry Bik was his teacher. After his military service, he became a teacher in the municipality of The Hague, where he soon specialised in drawing lessons. From 1937 to 1963 he was professor in the painting department at the Royal Academy of Art in The Hague. His friend, Paul Citroen, also taught there. For a few years (1943-1949) he was Professor at the Institute Applied Art, which later became the Rietveld Academie.

Schrofer was one of the founders of the Verve group - he coined the name. He was loved by his students; he received them at home and he taught them to be free to live and work. Among his pupils were: Hermanus Berserik, Toon Wegner and Co Westerik. His third wife, Hannie Bal, was also a painter. In his time he was a famous Hagenaar.

== Different styles ==
Schrofer painted in different styles and was a nonconformist. In the 1930s and 1940s he produced abstract paintings. Around 1948, precisely at the time of Cobra, he moved onto figurative painting. With Paul Citroen, Rein Draijer, Willem Jacob Rozendaal and Han van Dam, he had great influence on the students who are now under the Nieuwe Haagse School banner.

== Workshop in Voorschoten ==
In 1963 Schrofer set up a studio in Voorschoten in an old bakery on the Molenlaan. Here he worked only on figurative paintings, including a painting of three friends with the price tag, "ntk" (not for sale).
