= Henk Bremmer =

Dutch painter

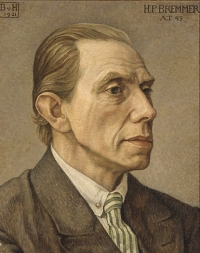
Henk Bremmer (1921); portrait by Bertha van Hasselt (1878-1932)

Hendricus Peter (Henk) Bremmer (17 May 1871, Leiden – 10 January 1956, The Hague) was a Dutch painter, art critic, art teacher, collector, and art dealer. He was the father of the painter Rudolph Bremmer (1900–1993).

Bremmer trained as a painter and artist. He worked in journalism from 1893 to 1895 and began teaching art in 1896. In 1906-1907, Helene Kröller-Müller, then one of the richest women in the Netherlands, was his pupil and, on his advice, she started building an art collection that ultimately formed the basis of the Kröller-Müller Museum. Bremmer also advised Hugo Tutein Nolthenius, who kept of bust of Bremmer in his collection.

Bremmer had contact with many artists. He lived from 1902 until his death in Artiestenhof in The Hague. In 1912 he came into contact with Bart van der Leck, providing financial support and a monthly allowance.

In 1906, he published the art critique Eene inleiding tot het zien van beeldende kunst. In 1913 he started a magazine of fine arts. Bremmer had so much influence in Dutch art in the first half of the 20th century that he was called the "Art Pope". From 14 October 2006 to 25 February 2007 an exhibition on Bremmer, entitled The Art Tsar, H.P. Bremmer, was held at the Kröller-Müller Museum in Otterlo.
