= Jurriaan Schrofer =

Dutch graphic designer

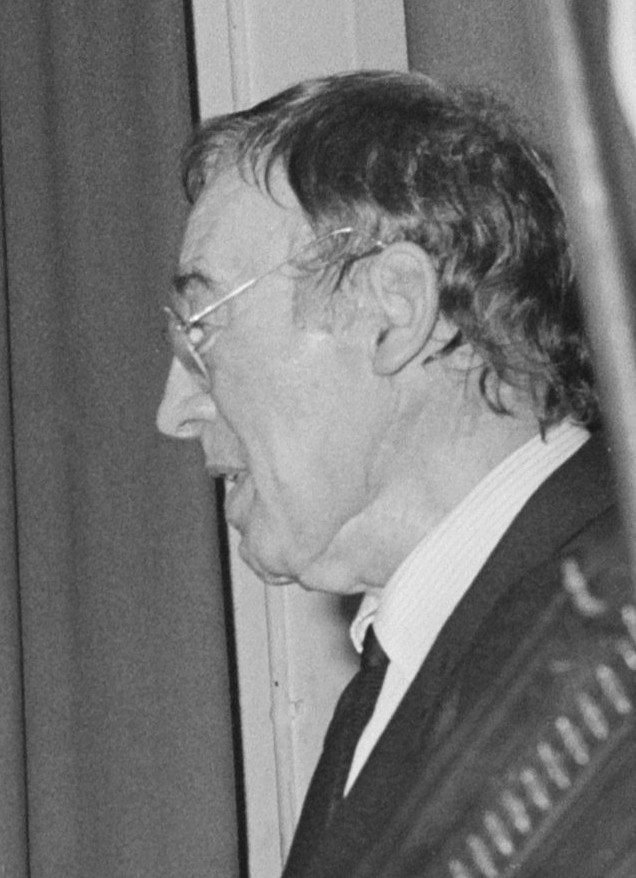
- Schrofer in 1985
- Born: Jurriaan Willem Schrofer; 15 April 1926; The Hague, Netherlands
- Died: 1 July 1990 (aged 64); Amsterdam, Netherlands
- Partner: Violette Cornelius (1956–1964)
- Father: Willem Schrofer
- Relatives: Hannie Bal (stepmother); Frans Schrofer (half-brother)

Jurriaan Willem Schrofer (Dutch pronunciation: [ˈjʏrijaːɱ ˈʋɪləm ˈsxroːfər]; 15 April 1926 – 1 July 1990) was a Dutch sculptor, graphic designer, type designer, and art school educator.

== Early life and education ==
Jurriaan Willem Schrofer was born on 15 April 1926 in The Hague, Netherlands. His father Willem Schrofer was a painter of abstract art.

In 1945, he graduated from the gymnasium and afterwards he briefly studied law. In the late 1940s, he moved from Leiden to Amsterdam, to become a film director, but he was not very successful.

== Work ==
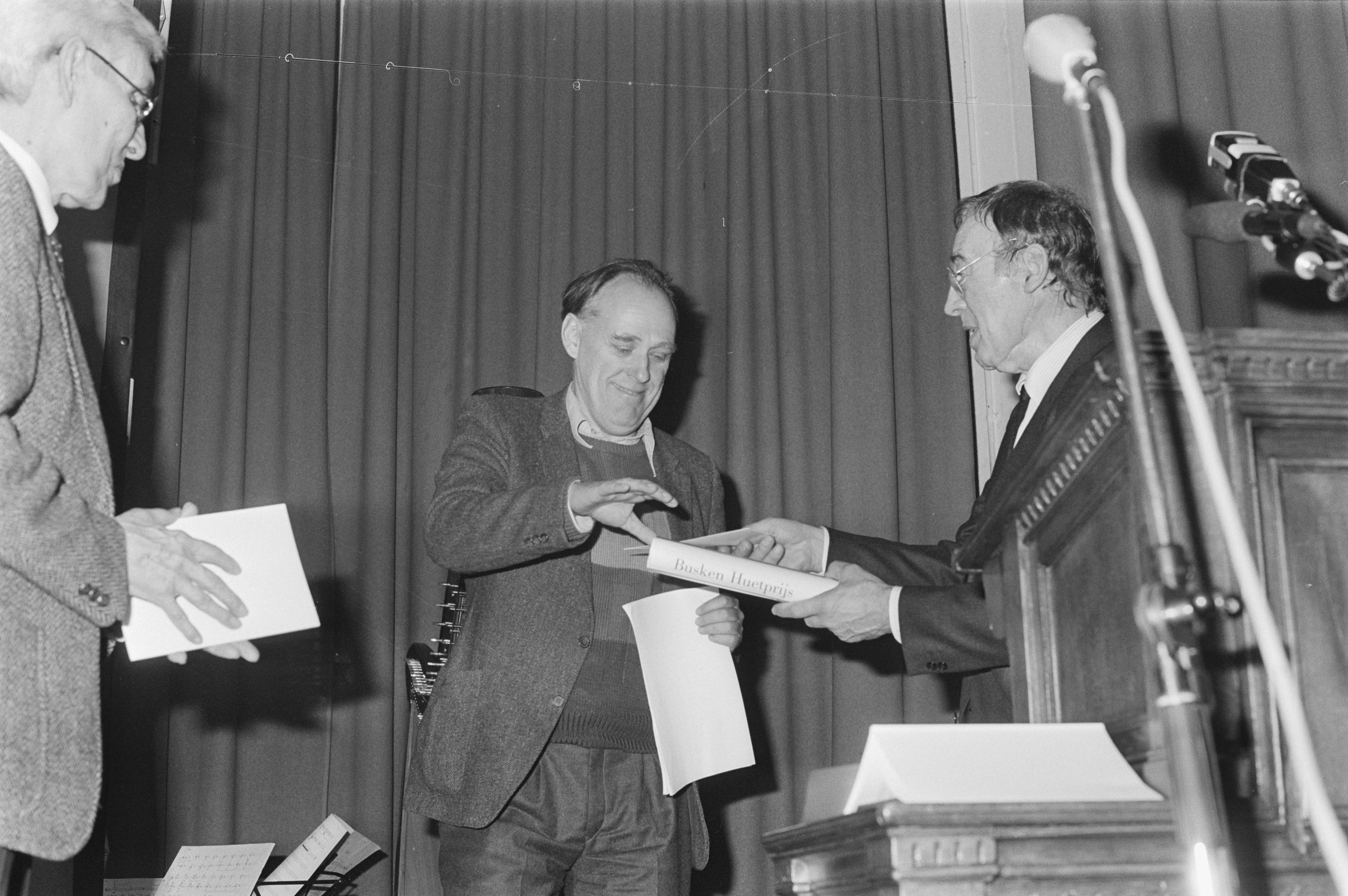
Hugo Brandt Corstius receives the Busken Huet Prize from Schrofer (right) in 1985

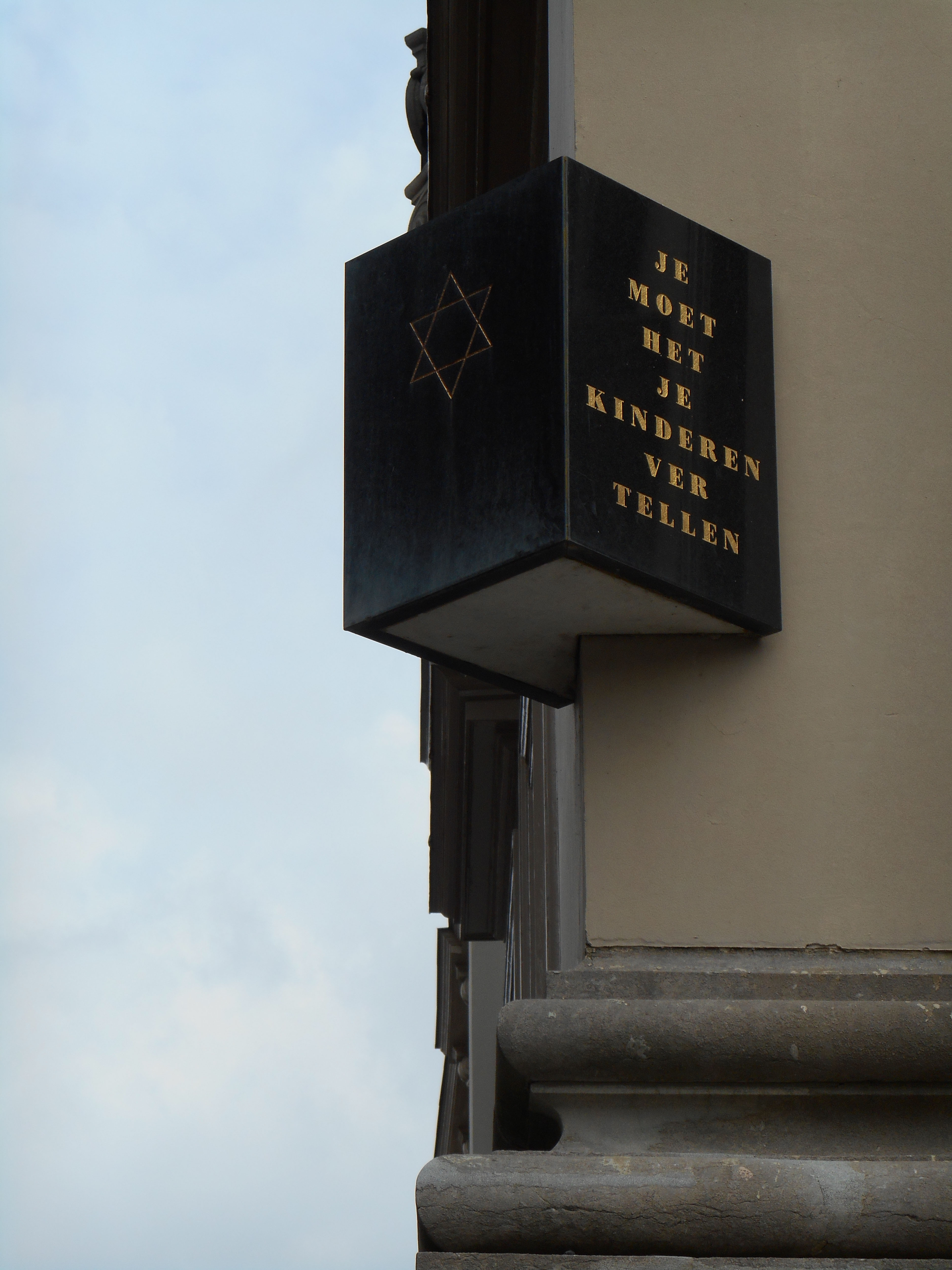
Schrofer designed this Holocaust memorial in Dordrecht from 1989

In 1949, Schrofer became an assistant of Dick Elffers.

From 1952 to 1955, he worked as designer for Drukkerij Meijer, a printer in Wormerveer.

From 1955 onwards, he worked as independent designer. He was awarded the H. N. Werkman Prize for a type specimen of Drukkerij Meijer in 1956. He was awarded the H. N. Werkman Prize a second time for his book design of Space for Living (1961) in 1962.

From 1974 to 1979, he was a partner at the design studio Total Design in Amsterdam.

From 1979 to 1984, he was director of the Academy for Fine Arts and Design in Arnhem.

== Death ==
Schrofer died on 1 July 1990 in Amsterdam. He was buried on De Brandenburg Cemetery in Bilthoven.

== Awards and honours ==
- H. N. Werkman Prize (1956)
- H. N. Werkman Prize (1962)
- Rizzoli Prize (1965)
- Advertizing Prize (1967)
- Rizzoli Prize (1970)
- Knight in the Order of Orange-Nassau (1975)
- Bührmann-Ubbens Paper Prize (1987)

== Bibliography ==
- 1987: Letters op maat (Letters by measure)
- 1988: Zienderogen (With seeing eyes)
