= Bram Roth =

Dutch artist and sculptot

Abraham Cornelis (Bram) Roth (The Hague, September 7, 1916 – October 21, 1995) was a Dutch sculptor.

== Live and Work ==
Roth studied sculpture with teachers such as Bon Ingen-Housz, Marino Marini and Albert Termote at the Koninklijke Academie van Beeldende Kunsten in The Hague. Later as a teacher himself was he connected to the Academie van Beeldende Kunsten en Technische Wetenschappen in Rotterdam. He worked in a semi-naturalistic, style; frequent subjects of his sculptures were women and horses.

He worked as an independent sculptor and painter, but was also a member of artists' groups such as the Pulchri Studio, Verve en the South Holland Cultural Group (Dutch: Culturele Raad Zuid-Holland). Roth was considered part of the artistic movement named the Nieuwe Haagse School.

Much of his work is in public spaces in The Hague.

== Works (highlights) ==
- In the Westbroekpark in The Hague:
  - Two Women with a Parasol (1960, limestone) van kalksteen.
  - Mother and Child with Doll's Pram (1962, bronze)
- Zuiderpark, The Hague
  - Woman and Man (1964)
  - Lying Woman (1984)
  - Relief (1988)
- Sweelinckplein, The Hague, The Stone Maid. The sculpture was added here in 2009
- Horse and Rider (bronze) on the Houtrustbrug, The Hague
- Facade sculpture of Jan van Goyen (bronze), Dunne Bierkade 16A, The Hague
- The Four Elements: Light, Delft University of Technology

== Selected Images ==
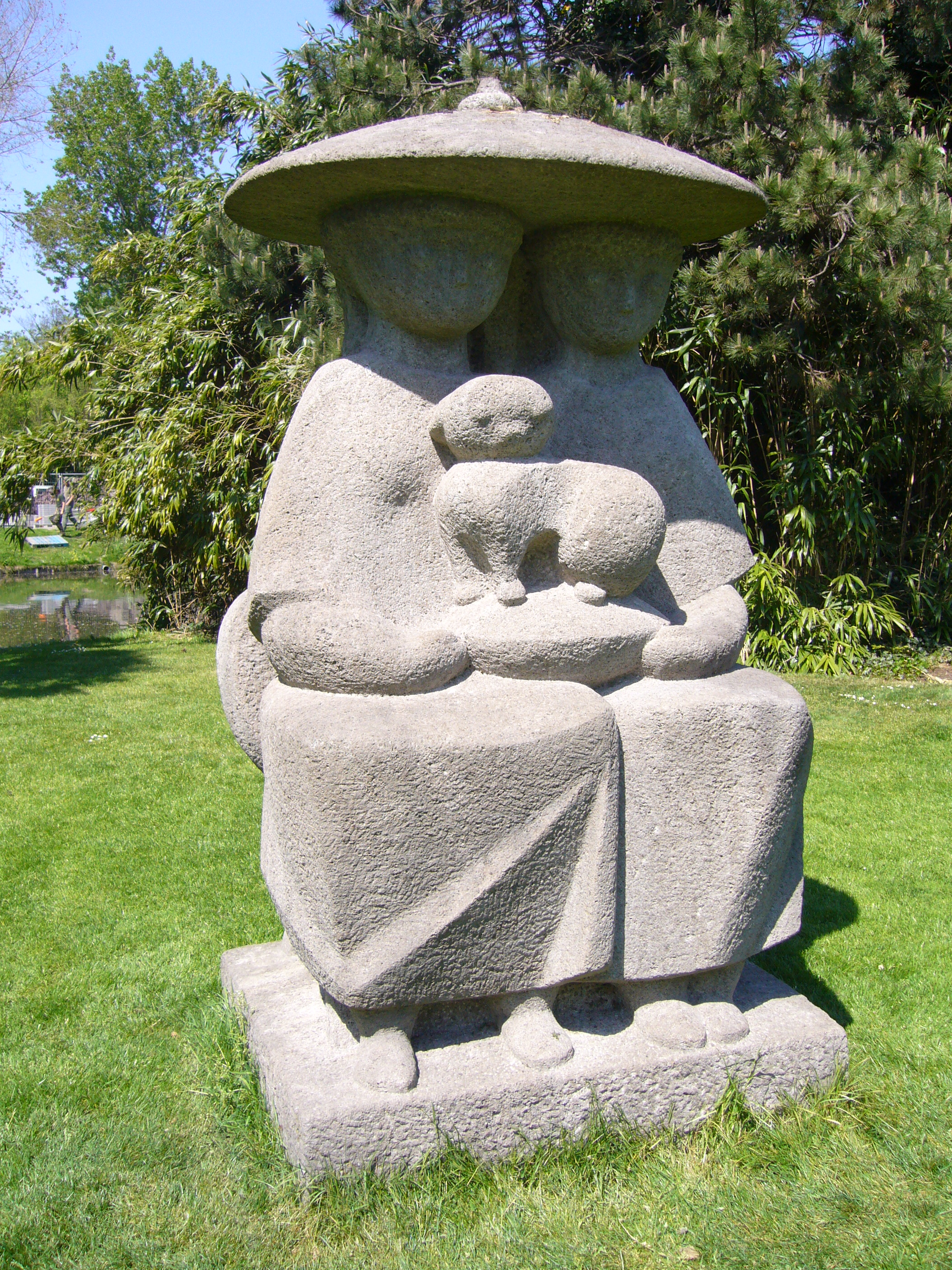
Two women under a parasol (1960), The Hague

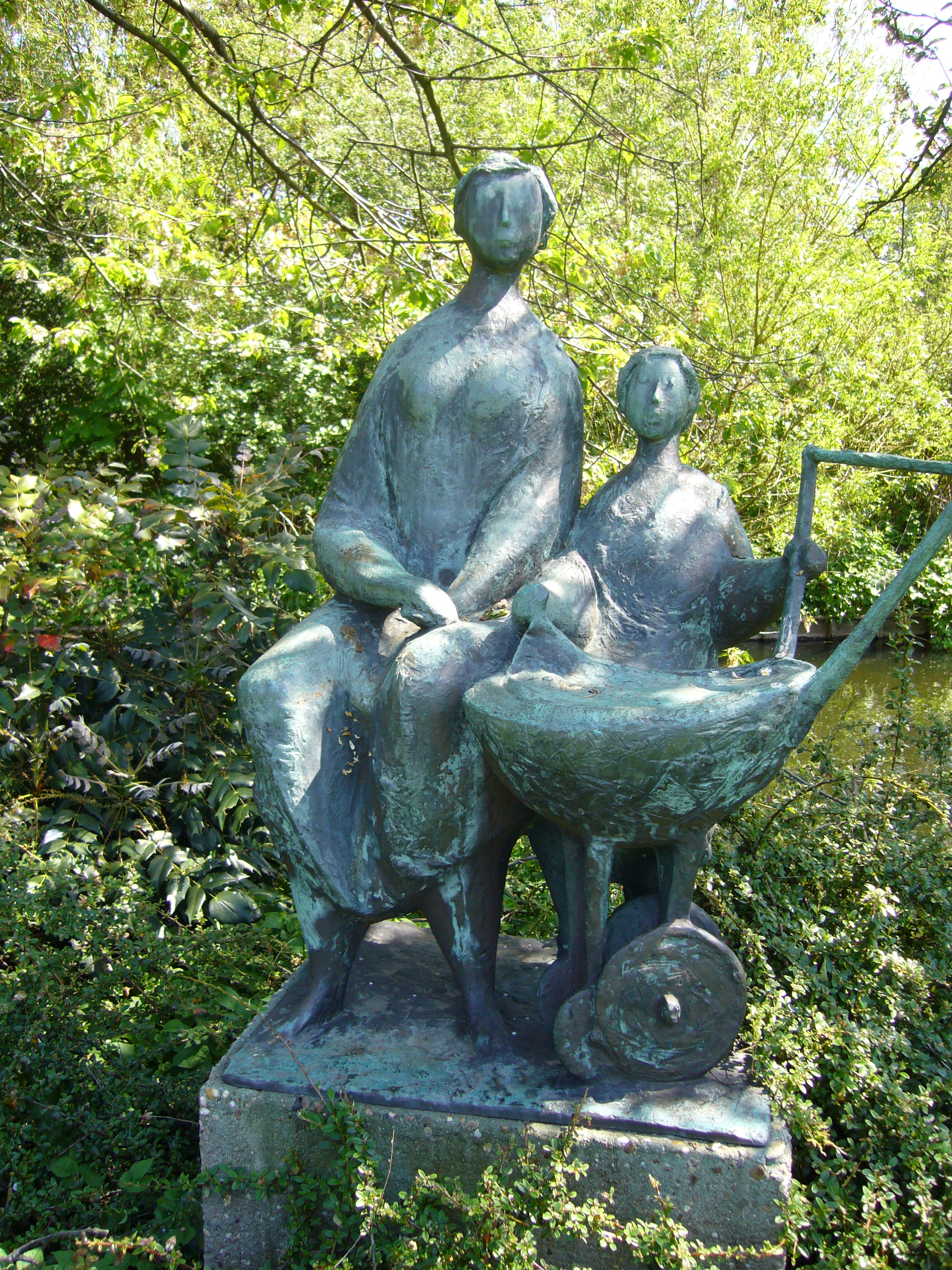
Mother and Child with pram (1962), The Hague

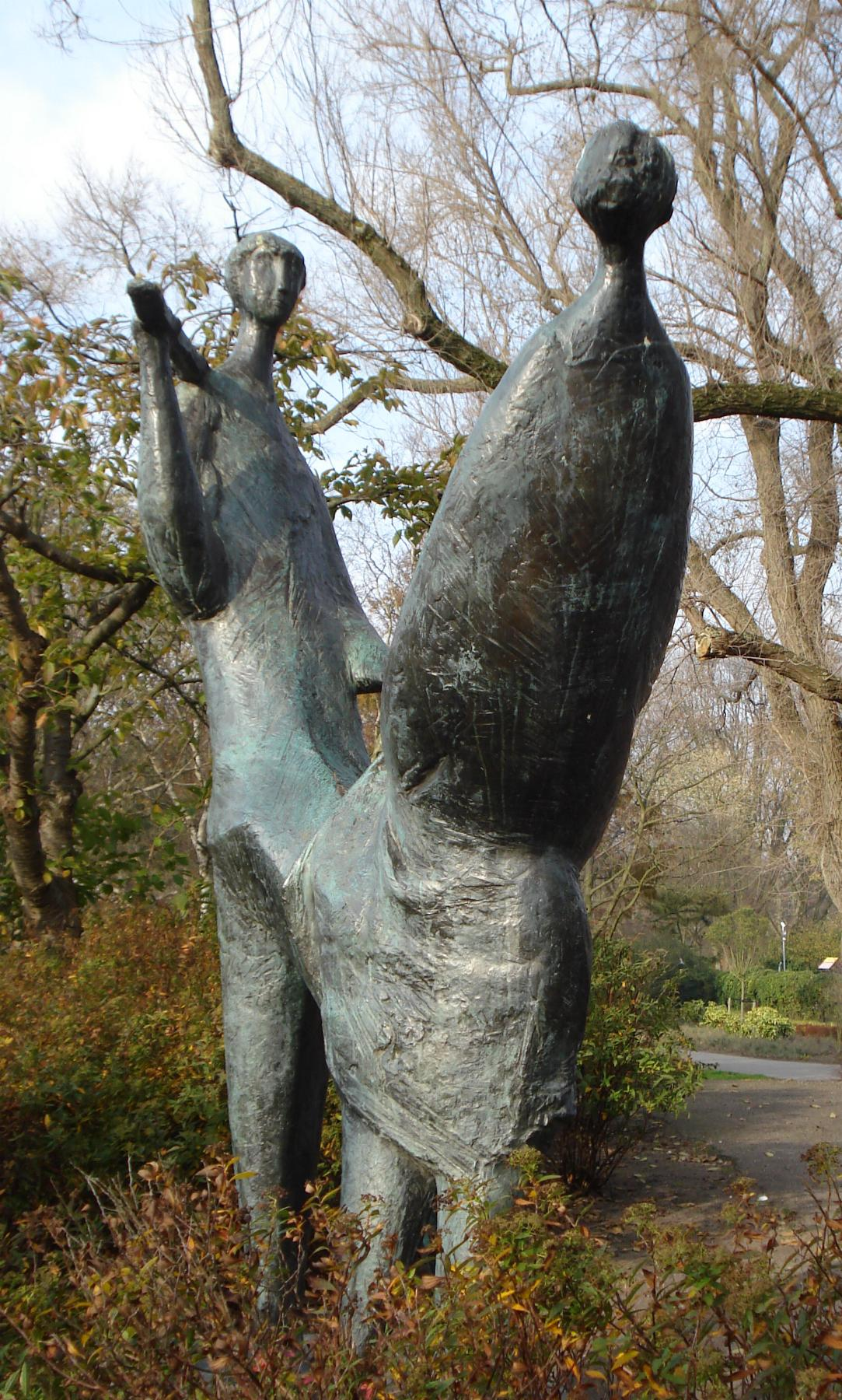
Woman and Man (1964), The Hague

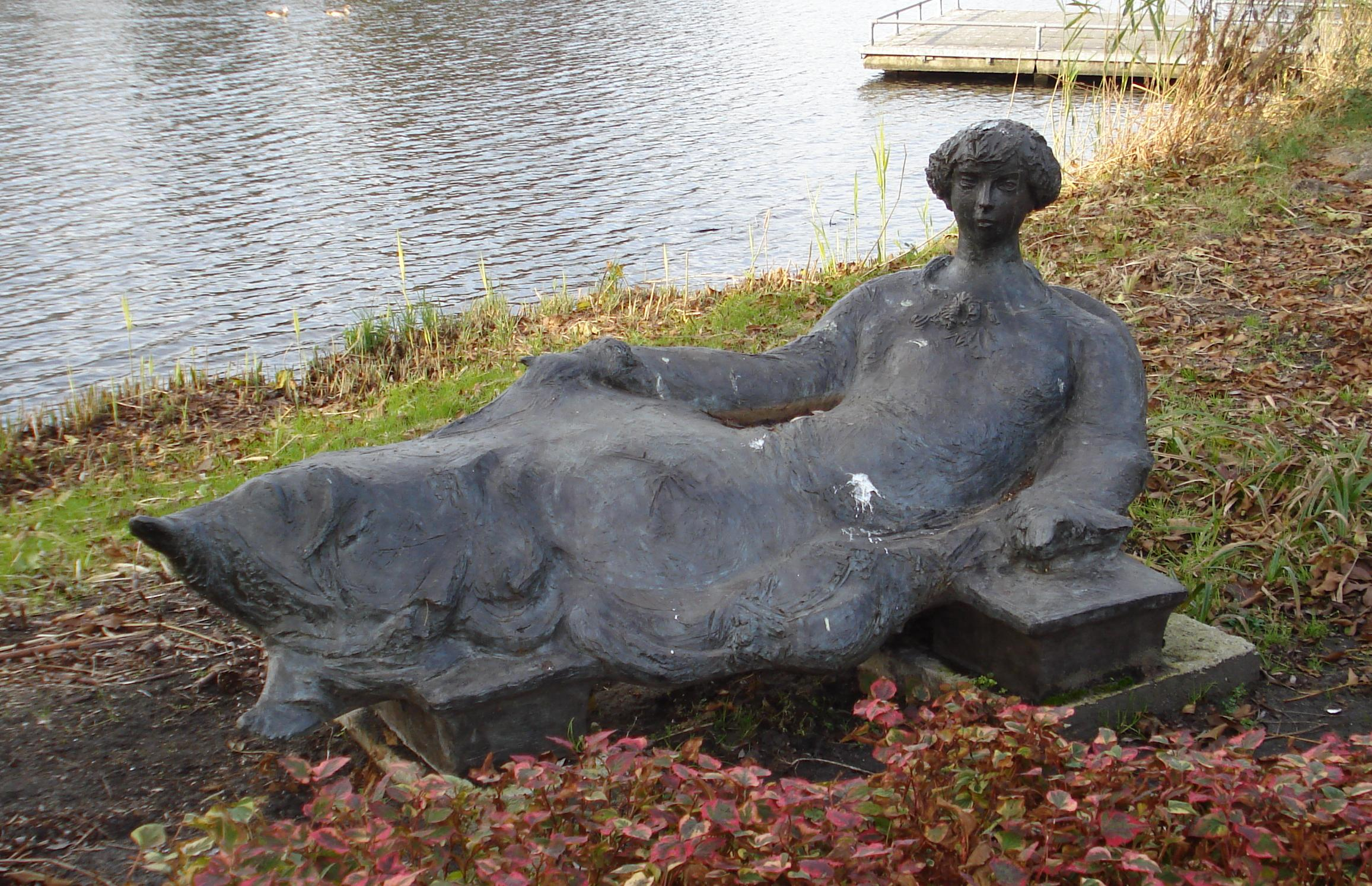
Lying Woman (1984), The Hague

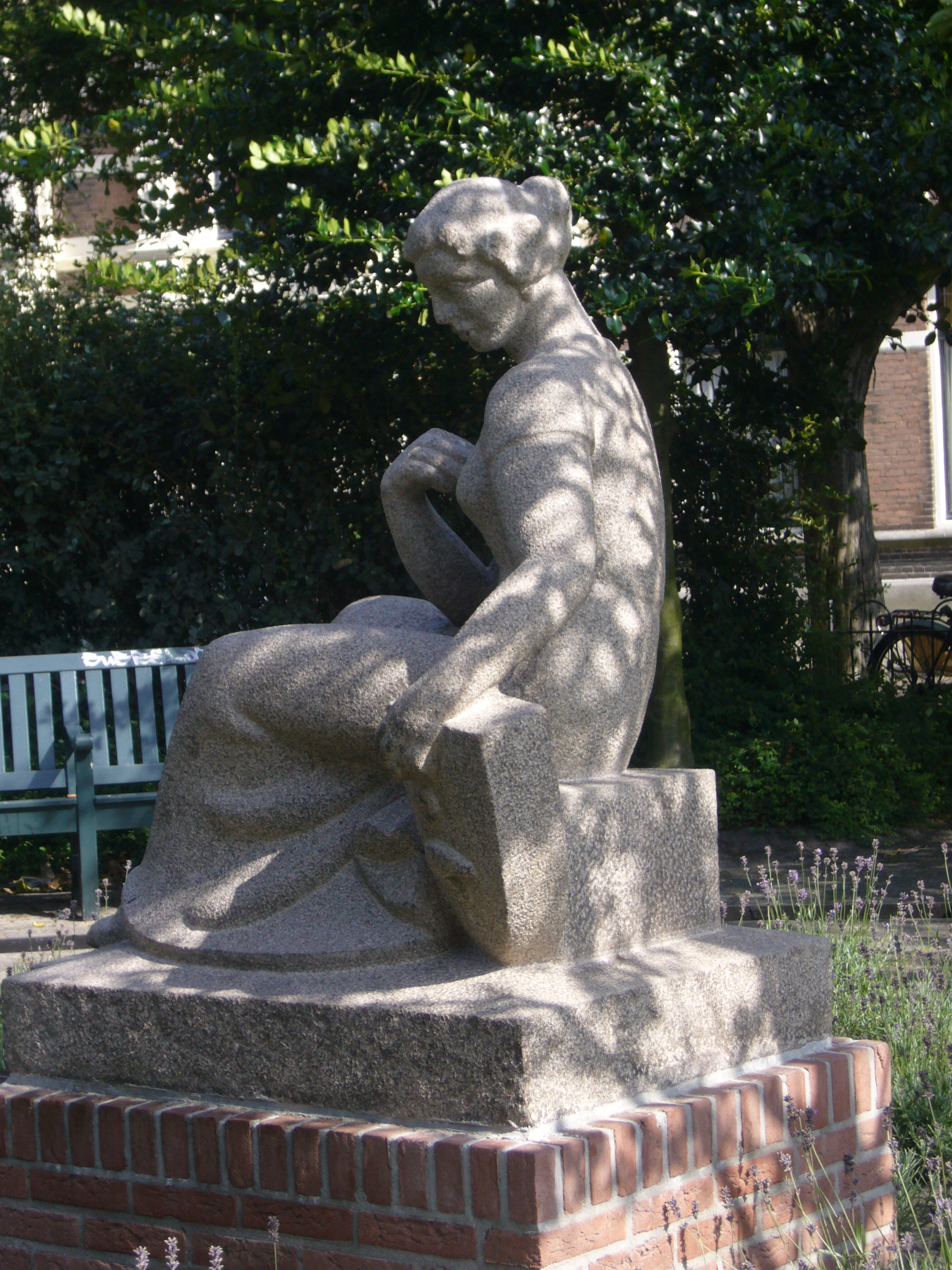
The Dutch Maiden, The Hague

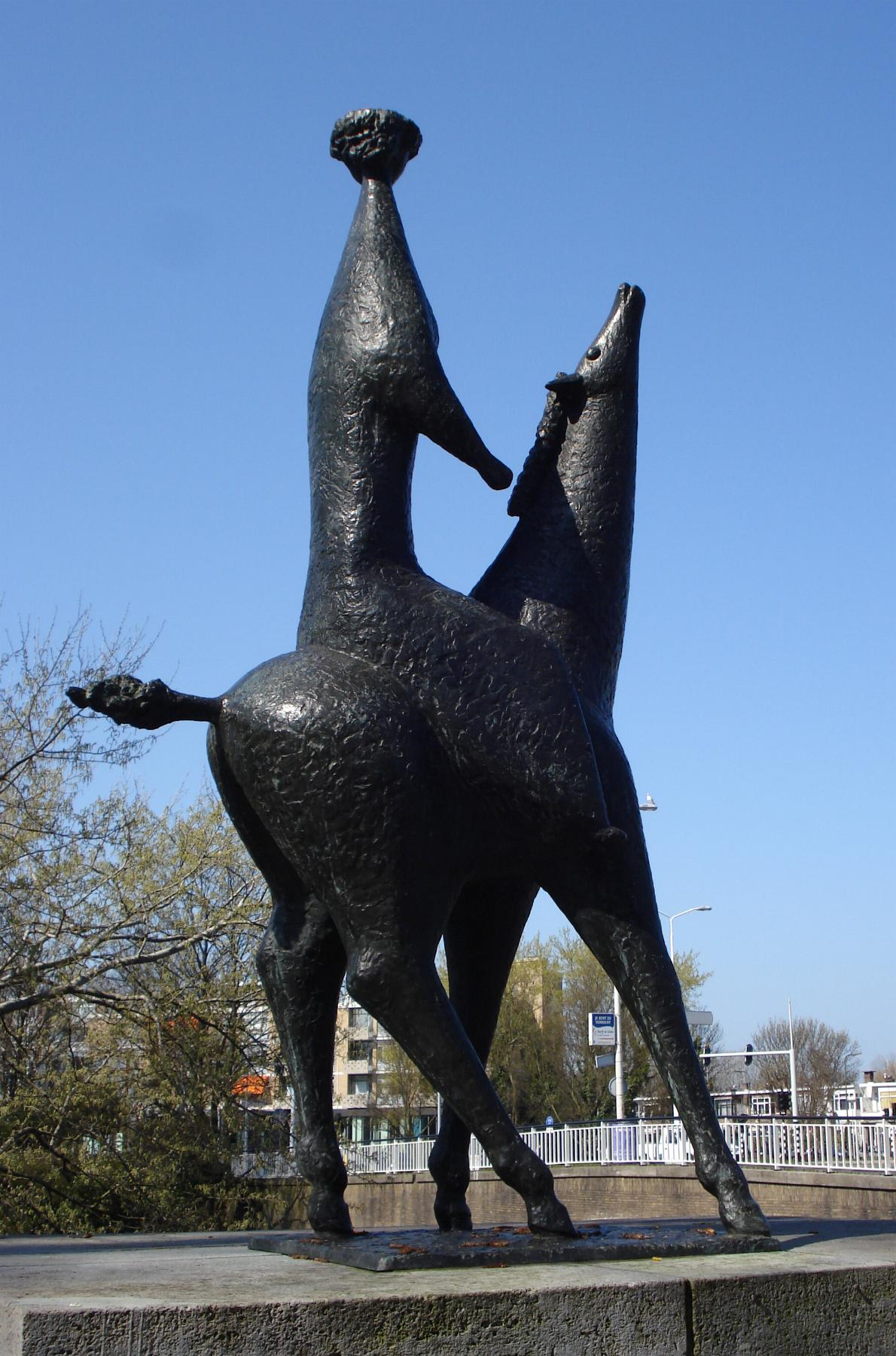
Horse and Rider, The Hague

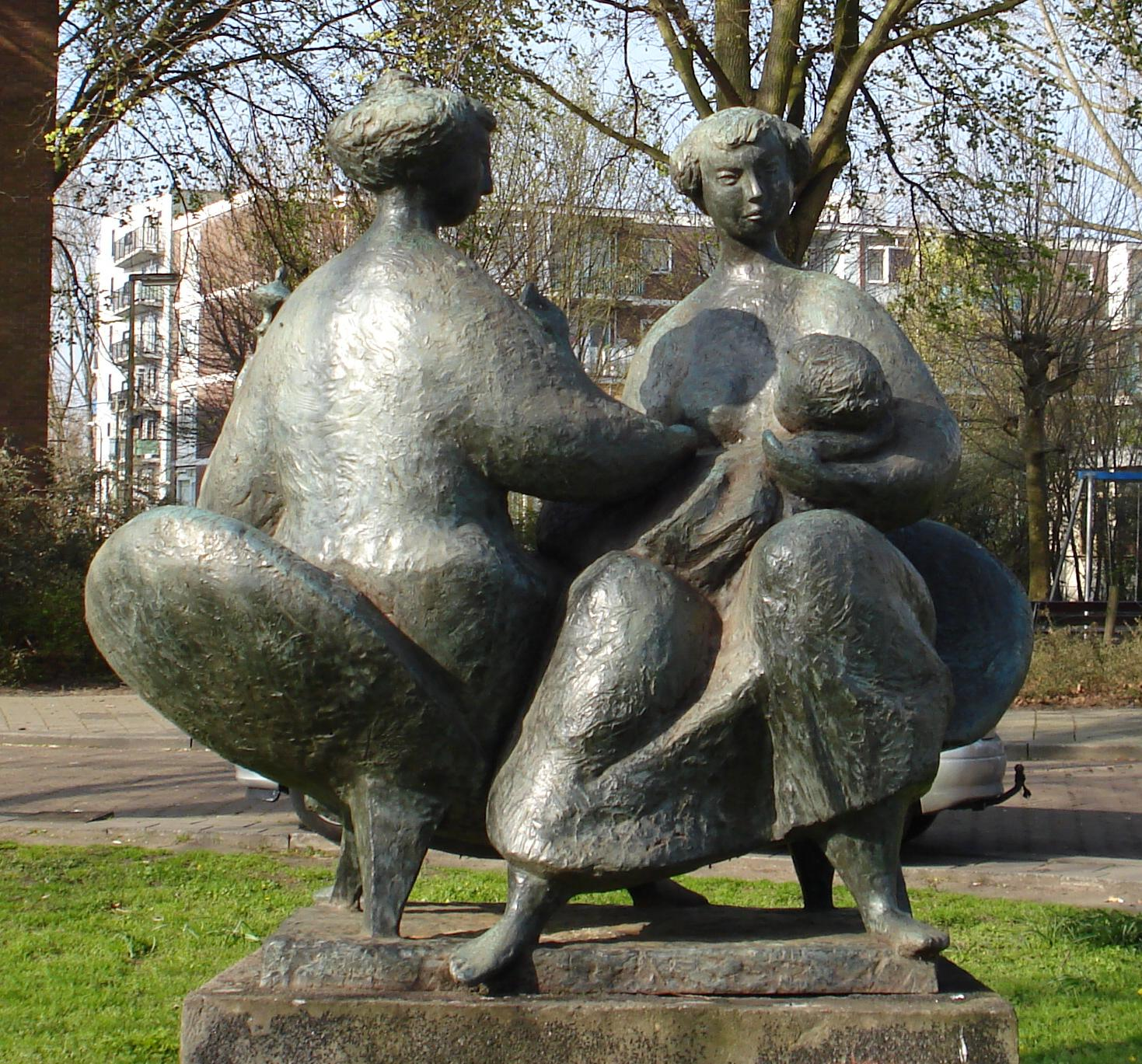
Two women and a child
