= Artiestenhof =

Coordinates: 52°05′00″N 4°17′56″E

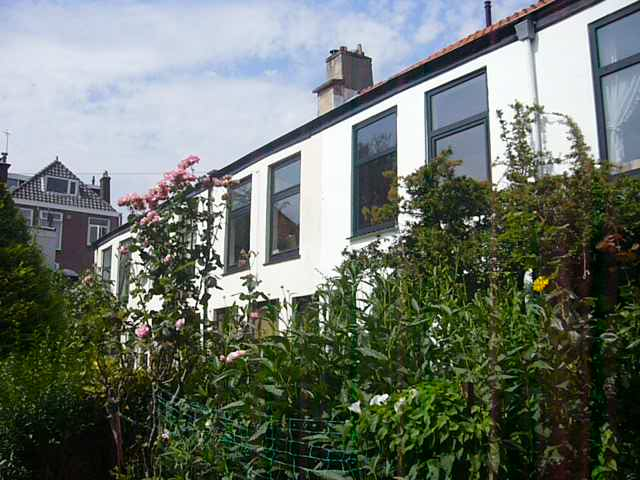
Artiestenhof

Artiestenhof is a hofje in the Trompstraat in the Dutch city of The Hague. It is one of the 115 historic courtyards of the Royal city of Hague.

The courtyard was built in 1878 on orders from William III of England. The buildings were intended to house the staff of the Royal Stables. During the 1930s and 40s artists began moving into the area, with it becoming known as Artiestenhof. It was during this time that Henk Bremmer lived nearby in Trompstraat 322.

== Residents ==
Artistic residents in the past were:

- Lucas Bauer (1896–1959), painter
- Theo Bitter (1916–1994), painter
- Nico of Bohemia (1916–1990), painter and restorer
- Henk Bremmer (1871–1956), the "Art Pope"
- Guido van Deth, puppeteer
- January Nobbe (1914–1981), puppeteer, ventriloquist and juggler.
- Ton van Otterloo (1910–1979), actor
- Peter Siers (Peter Ferdinand Oudkerk Pool) (1910–2001), comedian
