= Ingen Housz =

- family
- Country: Netherlands
- Founded: 1450
- Founder: Johan van Ruweel

Ingen-Housz (also: Ingenhousz or Ingen Housz) is the name of a Dutch patrician family from Venlo.

The oldest known ancestor is Johan van Ruweel who lived in the 15th century in Venlo. His descendants assumed the name "Ingenhousz" (literally "in the house"), and already belonged to the elite of Venlo in the 16th century. Later the family moved to Tuil and Zaltbommel. In the 18th century the Ingen Housz family relocated to Breda. Many members of the family pursued careers as physicians or pharmacists, and later as lawyers and bankers.

== Notable members ==
- Jan Ingen-Housz (1730–1799), physician, biologist and chemist, discoverer of photosynthesis
- Bon Ingen-Housz (1881–1953), sculptor

== Literature ==
- J. J. M. H. Verzijl: Genealogie der Venlosche familie Van Ruweel genaamd Ingenhuys (Venlo, 1934) (also published in the periodical De Limburgse Leeuw 1958).
- Nederland's Patriciaat, nr. 59 (1973), p. 108.
