= Jan Ingenhousz =

Dutch physiologist and chemist (1730–1799)

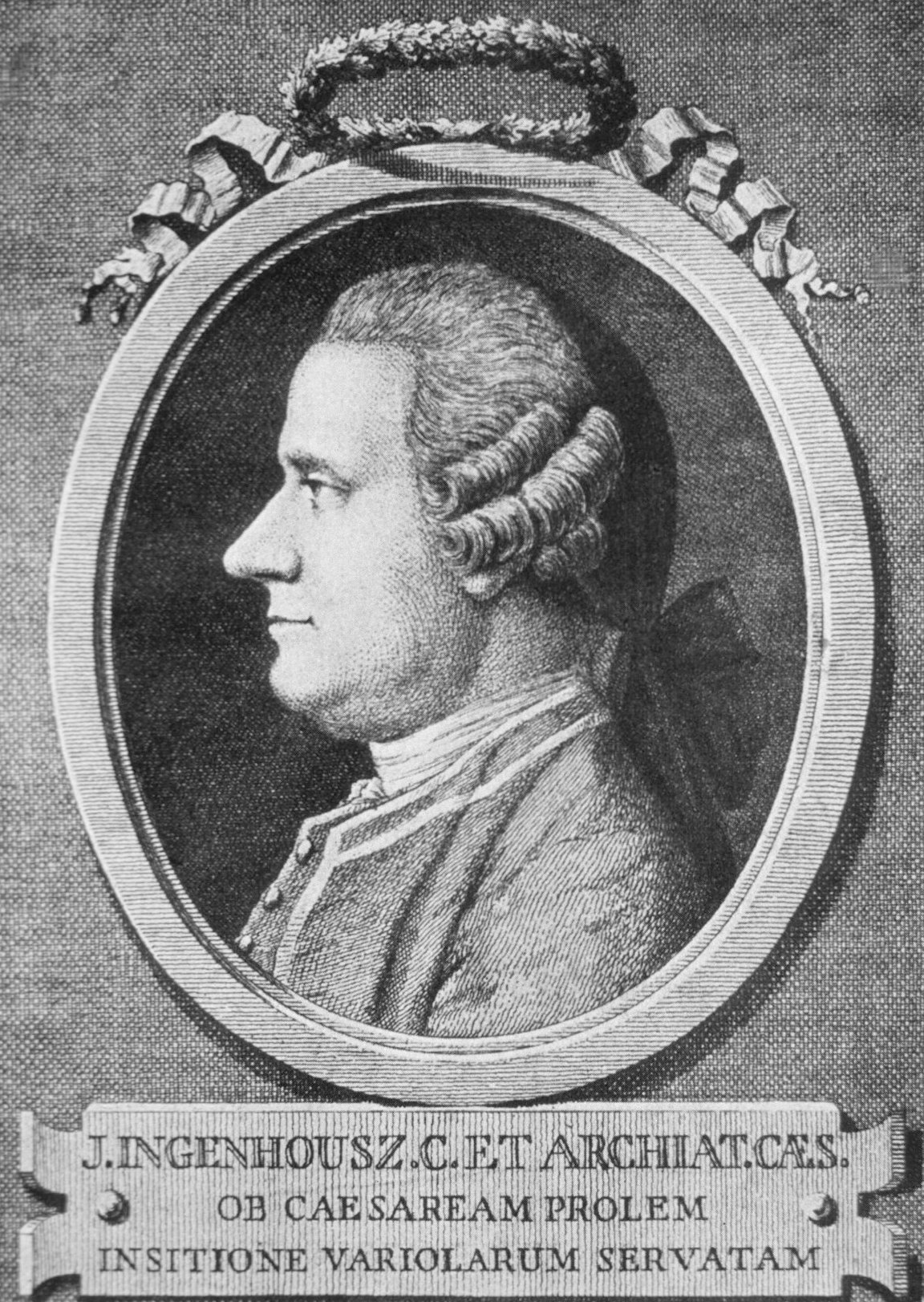
- Born: 8 December 1730; Breda, Staats-Brabant, Dutch Republic
- Died: 7 September 1799 (aged 68); Calne, Wiltshire, Great Britain
- Education: Catholic University of Leuven
- Known for: Photosynthesis
- Scientific career
- Fields: Physiology

Jan Ingenhousz FRS (8 December 1730 – 7 September 1799) was a Dutch-British physiologist, biologist and chemist.

He is best known for discovering photosynthesis by showing that light is essential to the process by which green plants absorb carbon dioxide and release oxygen. He also discovered that plants, like animals, have cellular respiration. In his lifetime he was known for successfully inoculating the members of the Habsburg family in Vienna against smallpox in 1768 and subsequently being the private counsellor and personal physician to the Austrian-Habsburg Empress Maria Theresa.

== Early life ==
He was born into the patrician Ingen Housz family in Breda in Staats-Brabant in the Dutch Republic. From the age of 16, Ingenhousz studied medicine at the University of Leuven, as the Protestant Universities were not then open to Catholics like himself, where he obtained his MD in 1753. He studied for two more years at the University of Leiden, where he attended lectures by, among others, Pieter van Musschenbroek, which led Ingenhousz to have a lifelong interest in electricity. In 1755 he returned home to Breda, where he started a general medical practice.

== Work with smallpox ==
Following his father's death in July 1764, Ingenhousz intended to travel through Europe for study, starting in England where he wanted to learn the latest techniques in inoculation against smallpox. Via the physician John Pringle, who had been a family friend since the 1740s, he quickly made many valuable contacts in London, and in due time became a master inoculator. In 1767, he inoculated 700 village people in a successful effort to combat an epidemic in Hertfordshire.

In 1768, Austrian-Habsburg Empress Maria Theresa read a letter by Pringle on the success in the fight against smallpox in England, whereas in the Austrian Empire the medical establishment vehemently opposed inoculations. She decided to have her own family inoculated first (a cousin had already died), and requested help via the English royal house. On Pringle's recommendation, Ingenhousz was selected and requested to travel to Austria. He had planned to inoculate the Royal Family by pricking them with a needle and thread that were coated with smallpox germs taken from the pus of a smallpox-infected person. The idea of the inoculation was that by giving a few germs to a healthy body the body would develop immunisation from smallpox. The inoculation was a success and he became Maria Theresa's court physician. He settled in Vienna, where in 1775 he married Agatha Maria Jacquin.

== Work with photosynthesis ==
In the 1770s, Ingenhousz first became interested in the gaseous exchanges of plants after meeting the scientist Joseph Priestley (1733–1804) at his house in Birstall, West Yorkshire, on 23 May 1771. Although Priestley previously observed that plants make and absorb gases, he had failed to comprehend the critical role of sunlight, and his inconclusive experiments yielded inconsistent results. Ingenhousz's travelling party in northern England included Benjamin Franklin. They then stayed at the rectory in Thornhill, West Yorkshire with the polymath and botanist Rev. John Michell.

In 1779, Ingenhousz conducted months-long exhaustive and methodical experimentation at a rented country house in Southall Green, and his research revealed that in the presence of sunlight, plants submerged in water give off bubbles from their green parts while, in the shade, the bubbles eventually stop. He identified the gas bubbles he observed as oxygen. And, in his own words, with regard to plants in air chambers (taken from the 300-plus page book he wrote summarising his findings), “All plants possess a power of correcting, in a few hours, foul air unfit for respiration; but only in clear day light, or in the sun shine.” He also discovered that in the dark, plants give off carbon dioxide. He realised as well that the amount of oxygen given off in the light is more than the amount of carbon dioxide given off in the dark; this realisation thus implied that some of the mass of plants comes from the air—not only from water and nutrients in the soil—an observation he continued to explore in future work.

== Other work ==
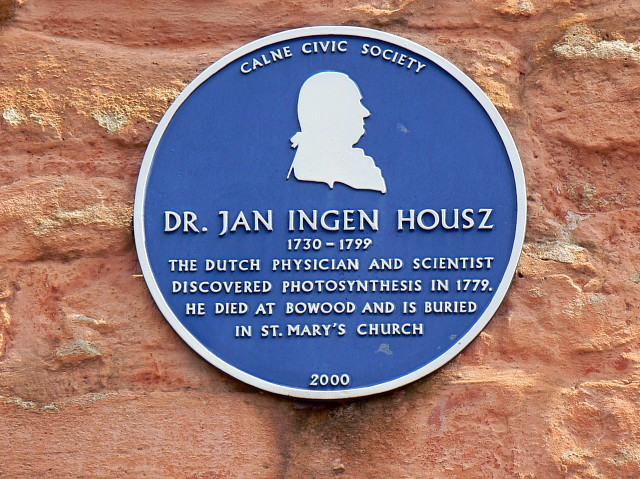
Blue plaque, Church Street, Calne

In addition to his work in the Netherlands and Austria, Ingenhousz spent time in France, England, Scotland, and Switzerland, among other places. He carried out research in electricity, heat conduction, and chemistry, and was in close and frequent correspondence with both Benjamin Franklin and Henry Cavendish.

Ingenhousz was elected a Fellow of the Royal Society of London in 1769 and a member of the American Philosophical Society in 1786.

In 1799, Ingenhousz died at Bowood House, near Calne in Wiltshire, and was buried in the churchyard of St Mary the Virgin, Calne. His wife died the following year.

== Tribute ==
On 8 December 2017, a Google Doodle commemorated Ingenhousz’s 287th birthday, recognising him as ”the inspired thinker who discovered the photosynthetic process.”
