= Jan Roëde =

Dutch artist (1914–2007)

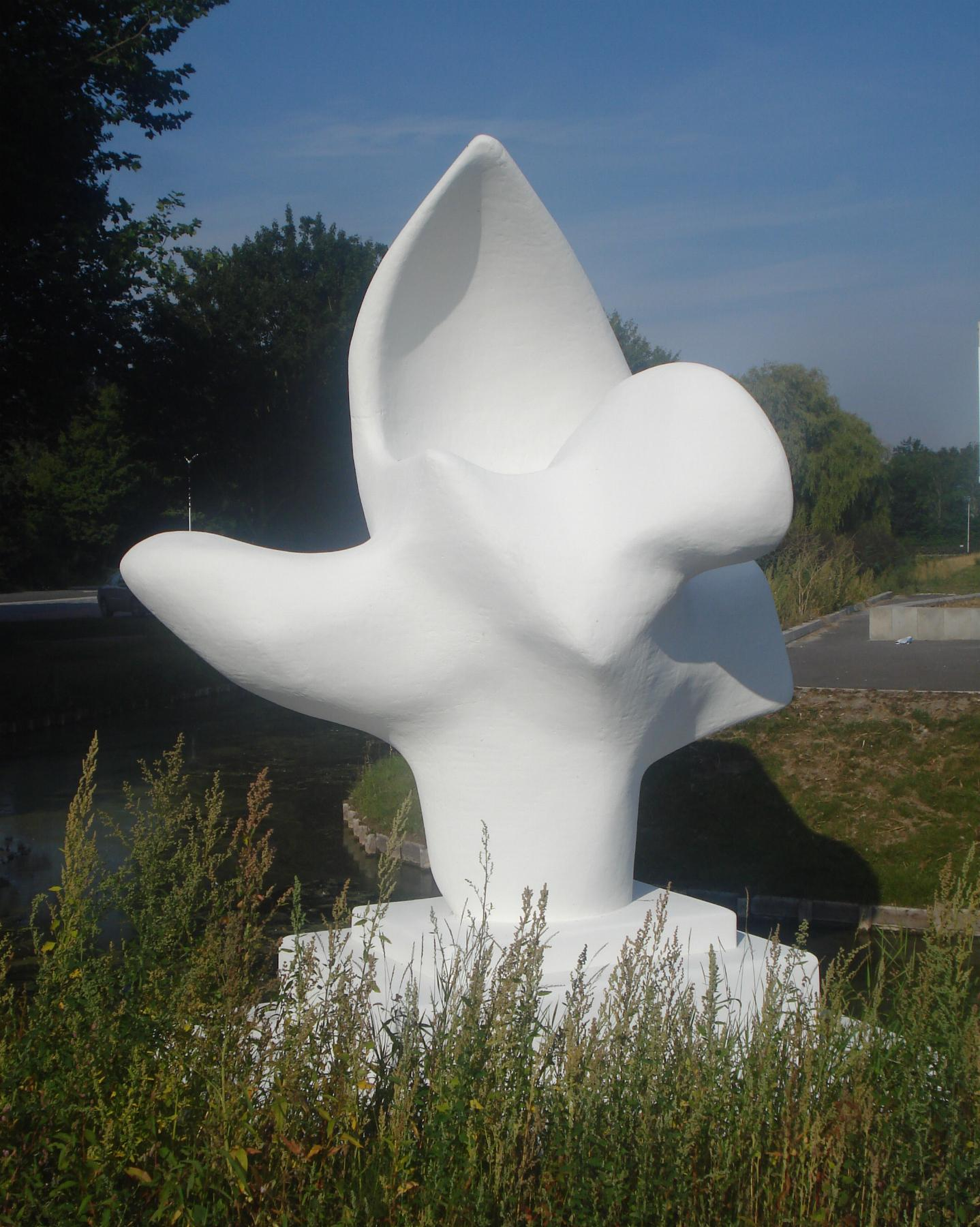
The White Angel in Hillegom (design by Jan Roëde)

Jan Roëde, real name Jan Roede (13 June 1914 in Groningen – 30 May 2007) was a Dutch artist who worked in numerous disciplines. He was a member of the Pulchri Studio in The Hague, and the Posthoorn-group.
