= Dirk Bus =

Dutch sculptor

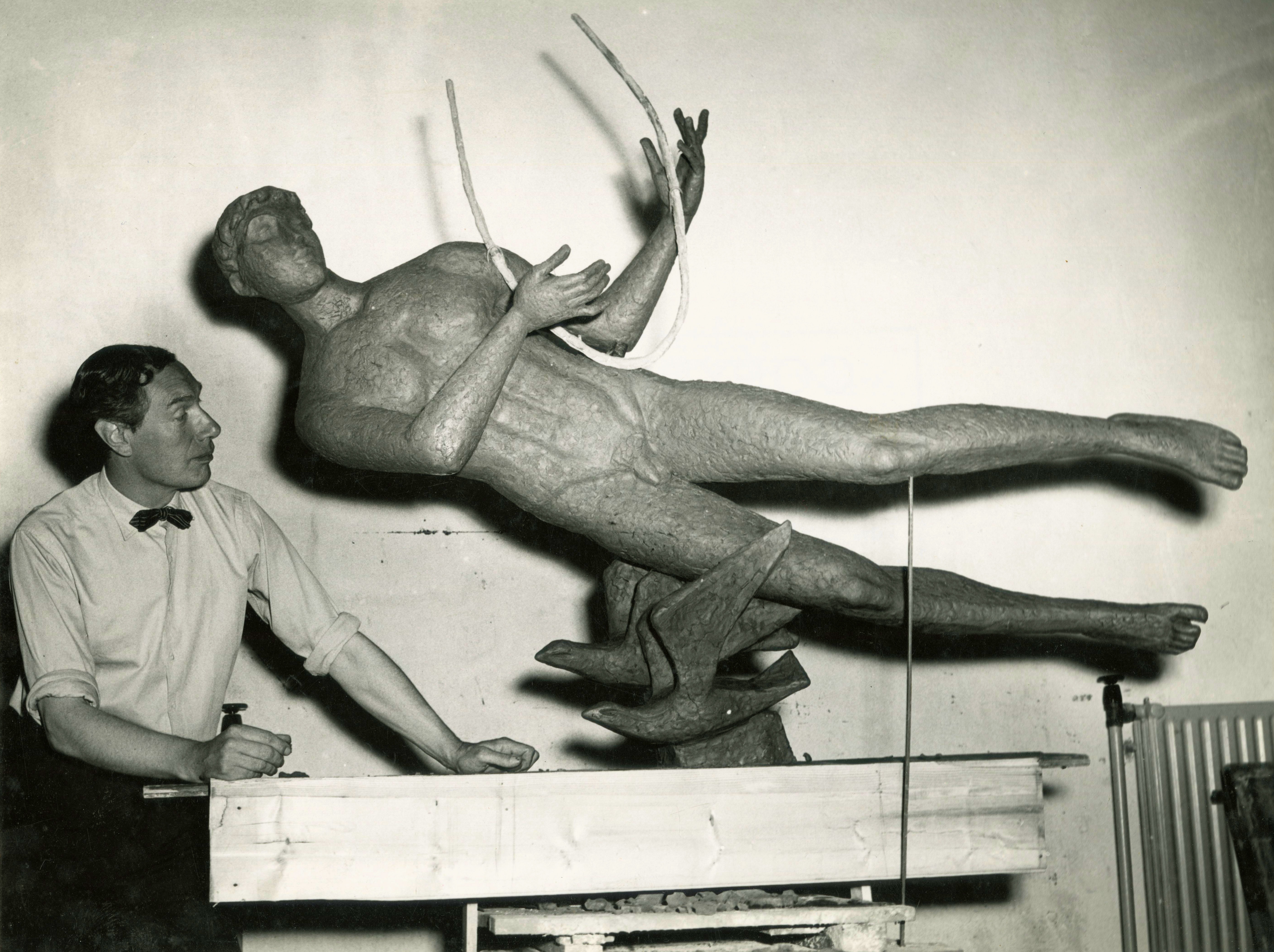

Dirk Bus (5 December 1907 - 10 June 1978 in The Hague) was a Dutch sculptor.

Bus was educated in sculpture at the Royal Academy of Art, The Hague and Rijksakademie van beeldende kunsten in Amsterdam. He was a student of Bon Ingen-Housz and Jan Bronner. He then taught sculpture at the Art Academy and the Hague Academy. One of his most famous pupils was the sculptor Kees Verkade.

Bus was chairman of the Pulchri Studio for years and member of the Dutch Society of Sculptors in Amsterdam. He co-founded the artistic group Hague Verve with Theo Bitter. Many of his public works are found in The Hague, with some notable sculptures on Lijnbaan Bridge and around the old town hall. Bus' work was included in the 1939 exhibition and sale Onze Kunst van Heden (Our Art of Today) at the Rijksmuseum in Amsterdam.

== Gallery of sculptures in The Hague ==
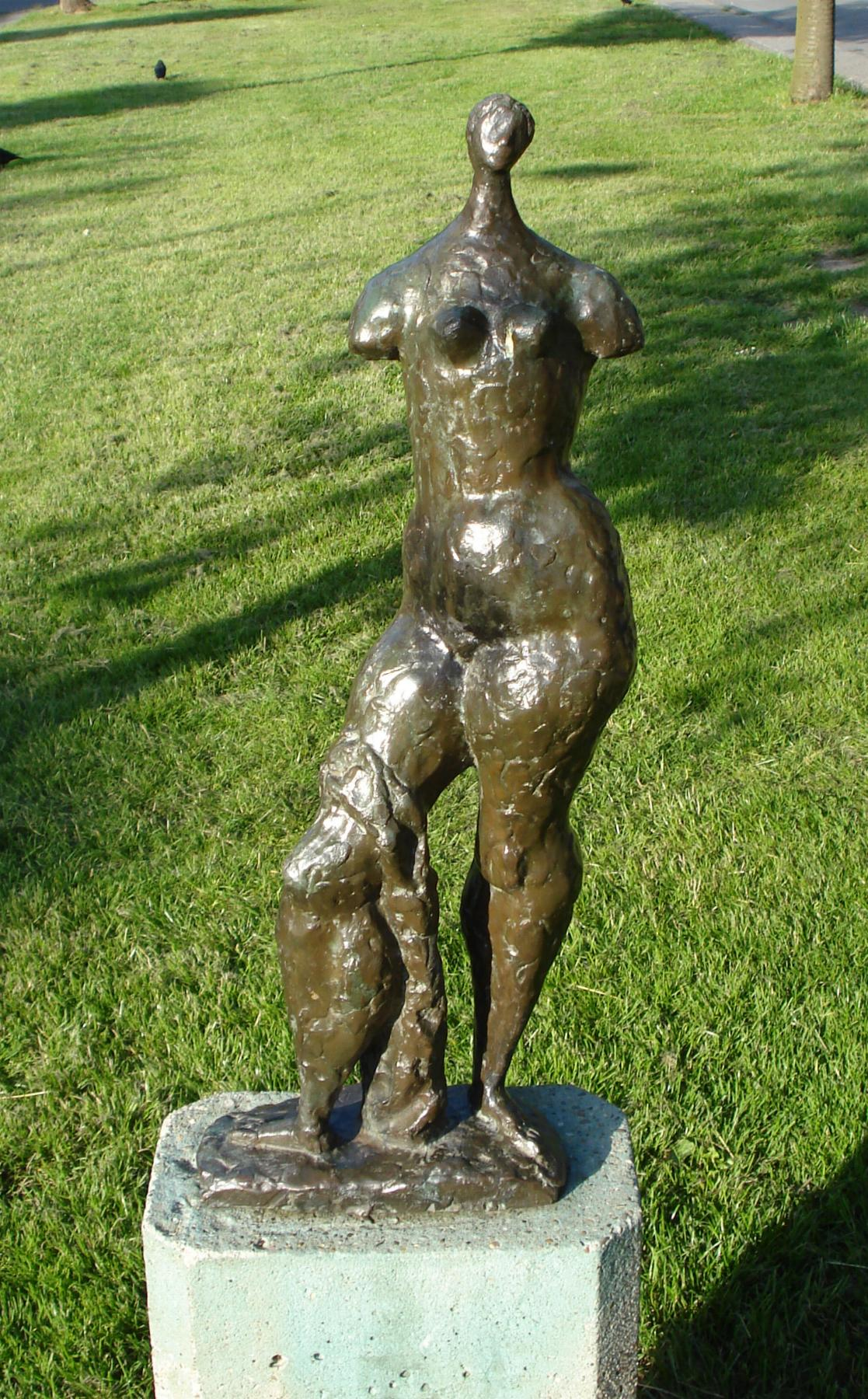
Vrouw (1965)

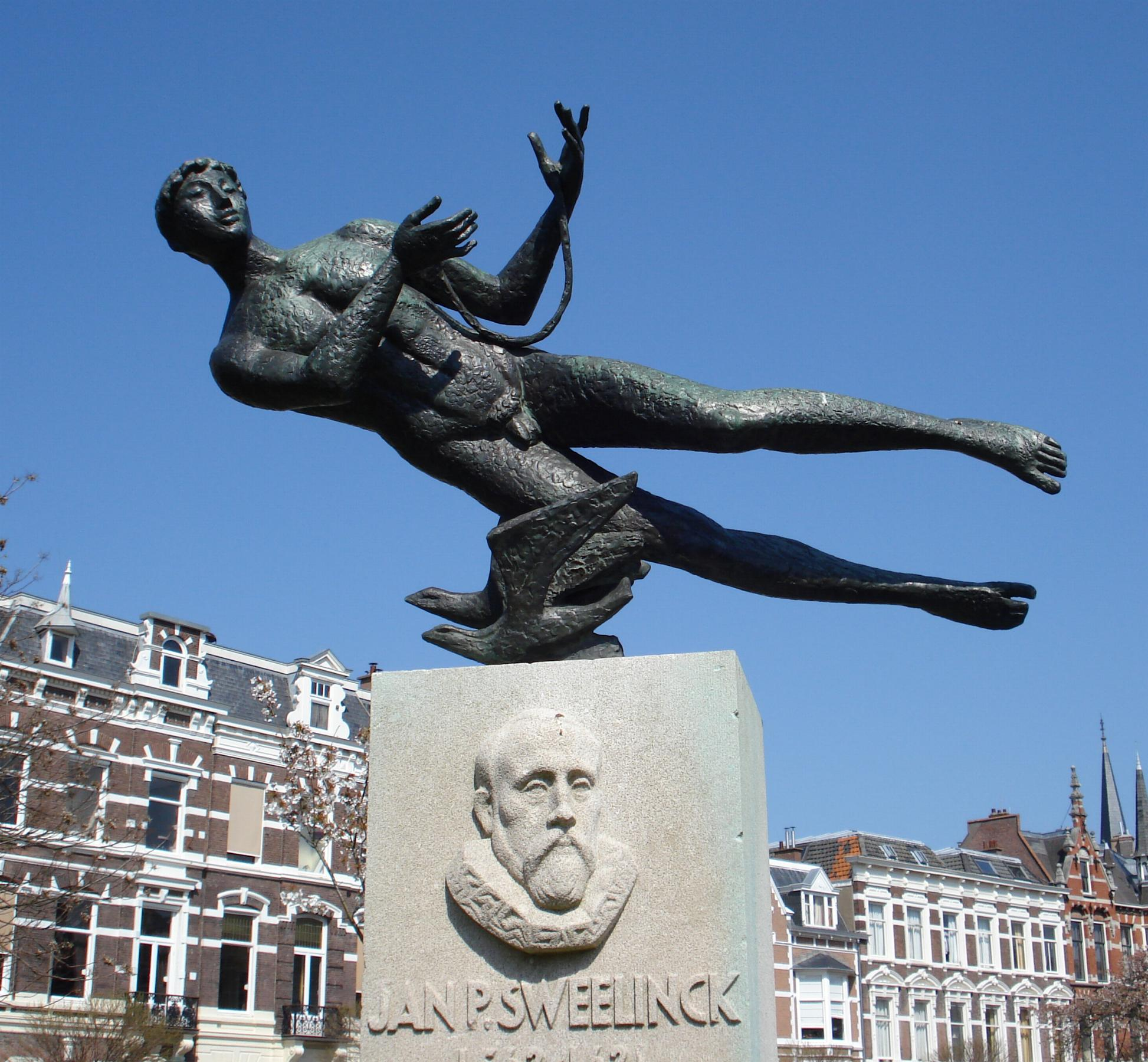
Jan Pieterszoon Sweelinck

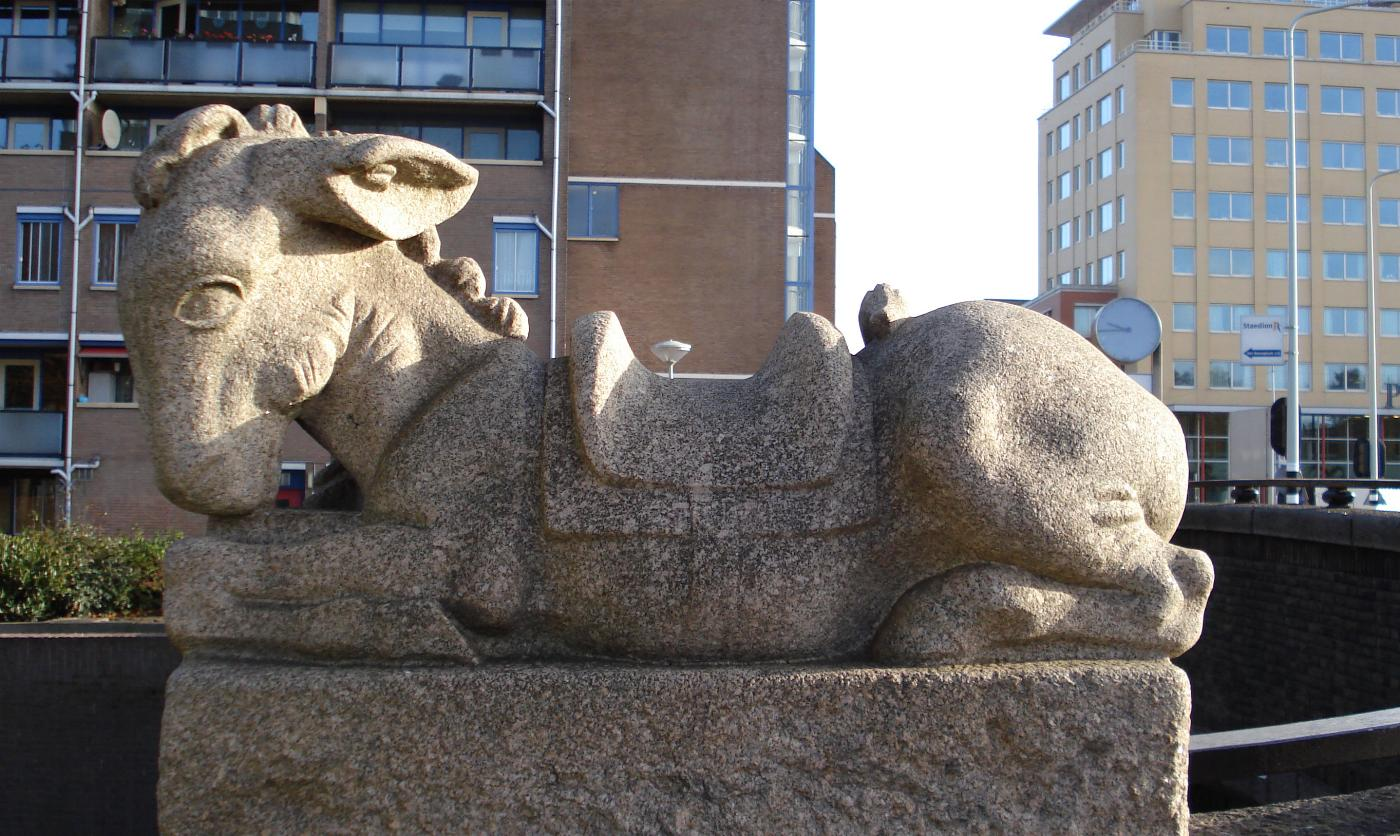
Ezel

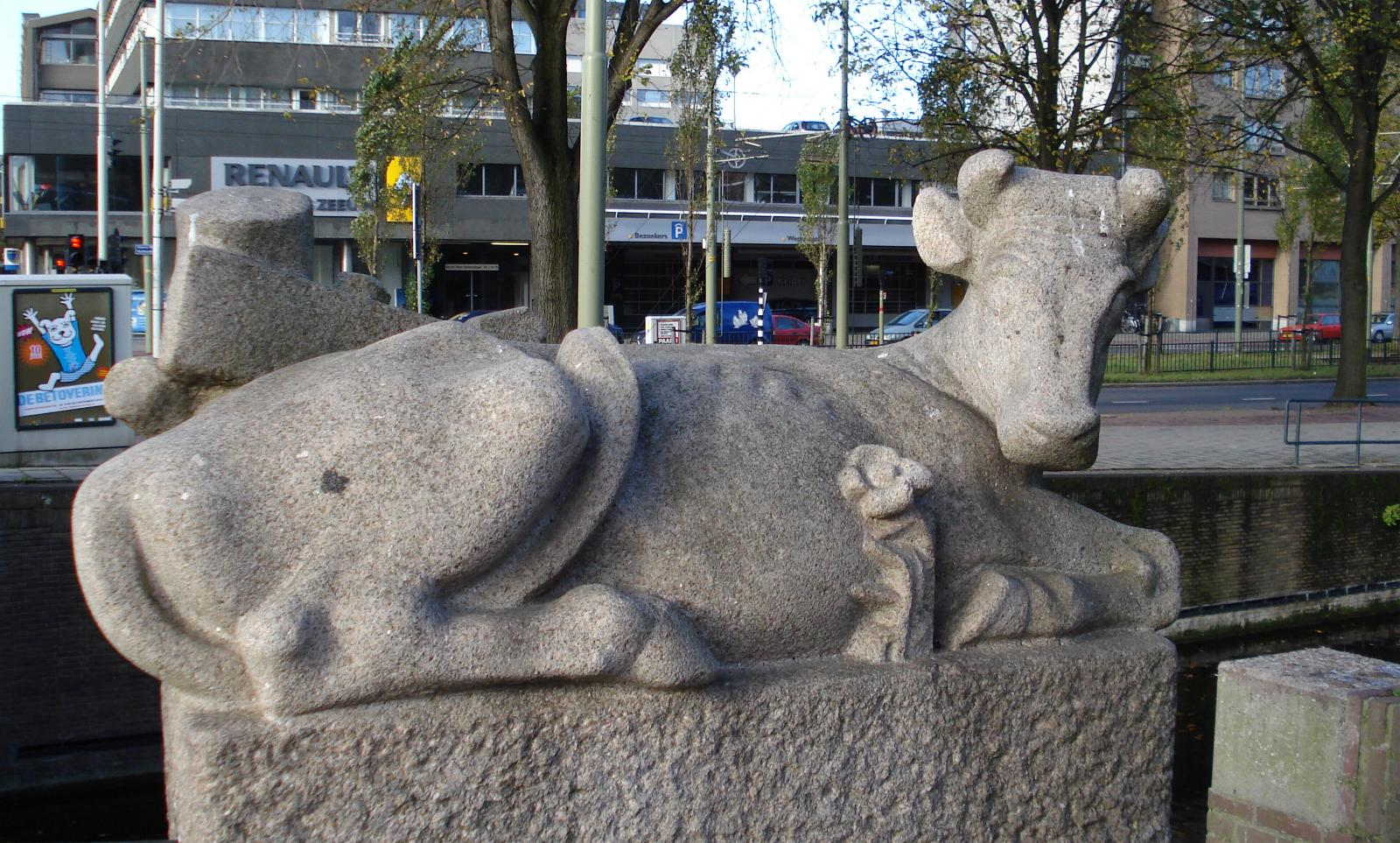
Koe
