= Theo Bitter =

Dutch painter

Theodorus (Theo) Bitter (16 December 1916 – 13 February 1994 in The Hague) was a Dutch graphic artist, painter and draftsman. He also made monumental art, designed textiles, and illustrated books.

== Education and career ==
Bitter was educated at the Royal Academy of Arts in the Hague. From 1946 to 1960, he taught at the same academy. He worked in The Hague, Oslo, and Lecce. In The Hague, he resided for many years at the Artiestenhof in Trompstraat.

He painted many family portraits and his watercolor paintings were realist. His landscapes and figures reflected an abstract expressionist style. Bitter co-founded the artistic group Hague Verve with Dirk Bus and was a member of the Pulchri Studio.

Bitter taught Margreet van Dulmen, Hubert Herbergh, Leonie Kording, Ronnie Meerts, Henry Oostenbrink, Piet Smissaert, and L.D. Verkouteren.
