= Kees Andrea =

Dutch artist

Kees Andrea and other Dutch painters (film, 1947)

Cornelis (Kees) Andrea (3 February 1914 in The Hague – 7 July 2006 in The Hague) was a Dutch artist. He was a member of the Pulchri Studio in The Hague, and member of the Verve group. Primarily a graphic artist, he also worked in textiles. His work was part of the painting event in the art competition at the 1948 Summer Olympics.

He was married to the illustrator Matty Naezer and was the father of the artist Pat Andrea.
