= German International School of The Hague =

School in Nigeria

- Deutsche Internationale Schule Den Haag

Location
- Van Bleiswijkstraat 125 2582 LB The Hague Netherlands; The Hague; Netherlands; 52.0944°N 4.2808°E

Information
- Type: German international school (pre-school, primary and secondary school), bilingual kindergarten
- Principal: Regina Metz
- Campus size: 300
- Website: disdh.nl

German International School of The Hague (German: Deutsche Internationale Schule Den Haag, GISNC) is a German international school in The Hague, Netherlands. It includes levels Kindergarten through Sekundarstufe II (senior high school).

The German International School of The Hague started as a "church school" to prepare children for the confirmation in the Evangelical community, in times when Germany consisted of many smaller states (1856). General school curriculum started in 1883.

In 1919, the "Deutscher Schulverein Den Haag" took over the school, and in 1921 the first final exams under supervision of a representative of the German Empire took place.

After the Second World War, the German school system in the Netherlands had to be completely rebuilt. It took until 1954 until in The Hague the foundation "Stichting Duitse Taalkring" was founded, and later the school could be reopened. The current school building was completed in 1971, and the school moved into its current location.
