= Hannie Bal =

Dutch painter (1921–2012)

Johanna Anna Maria "Hannie" Bal (4 August 1921 - 24 October 2012) was a Dutch painter and part of the Verve movement.

== Background ==
Hannie Bal was born in The Hague to a well-off family. Her father was an elderly retired pharmacist.

== Education ==
She attended a girls high school and had a strict upbringing. An artistic aunt noticed her talent for drawing and encouraged her to study at the Royal Academy of Art, The Hague. There she enjoyed greater freedom, despite the war. She also studied at the Royal Academy of Fine Arts (Antwerp).

== Marriage to Willem Schrofer ==
Whilst at the Royal Academy of Art, The Hague, Hannie fell in love with her portrait painter teacher. Willem Schrofer was a famous painter, but 23 years older than her, previously married, and known as a charmer. Her parents did not approve of the marriage but she disregarded her parents' opinion and married him in 1948. They spent their honeymoon in Paris where they sketched the scenery from the café terraces together. Together they had four children: Leonhard, Annemarie, Yvonne, and Franciscus (Frans). Her son, Frans Schrofer is a well-known Dutch furniture designer.

== Work ==
She produced paintings, watercolors and drawings, with her favourite themes including interiors, non-figurative work, cityscapes, landscapes and still life. She worked in The Hague and in Voorschoten. Together with fellow artists, she and her husband founded The Hague's Verve group. Her work is included in the New Hague School (Nieuwe Haagse School). She took a reluctant break from painting to raise their four children in Voorschoten. However, she was widowed at the age of 47 in 1968 and as her children were older she returned to painting with a passion - using the atelier of her late husband. Together with two friends from the Royal Academy of Art, The Hague, (Cara Waller and Jacoba Greven) she embarked on long journeys and their adventures provided great inspiration for her work. She was a part of The Hague Art Circle (Kunstkring) and was a member of the board. Together with this regained freedom, she moved to a big house in Benoordenhout, filling the empty walls with paintings.
