= Co Westerik =

Dutch visual artist

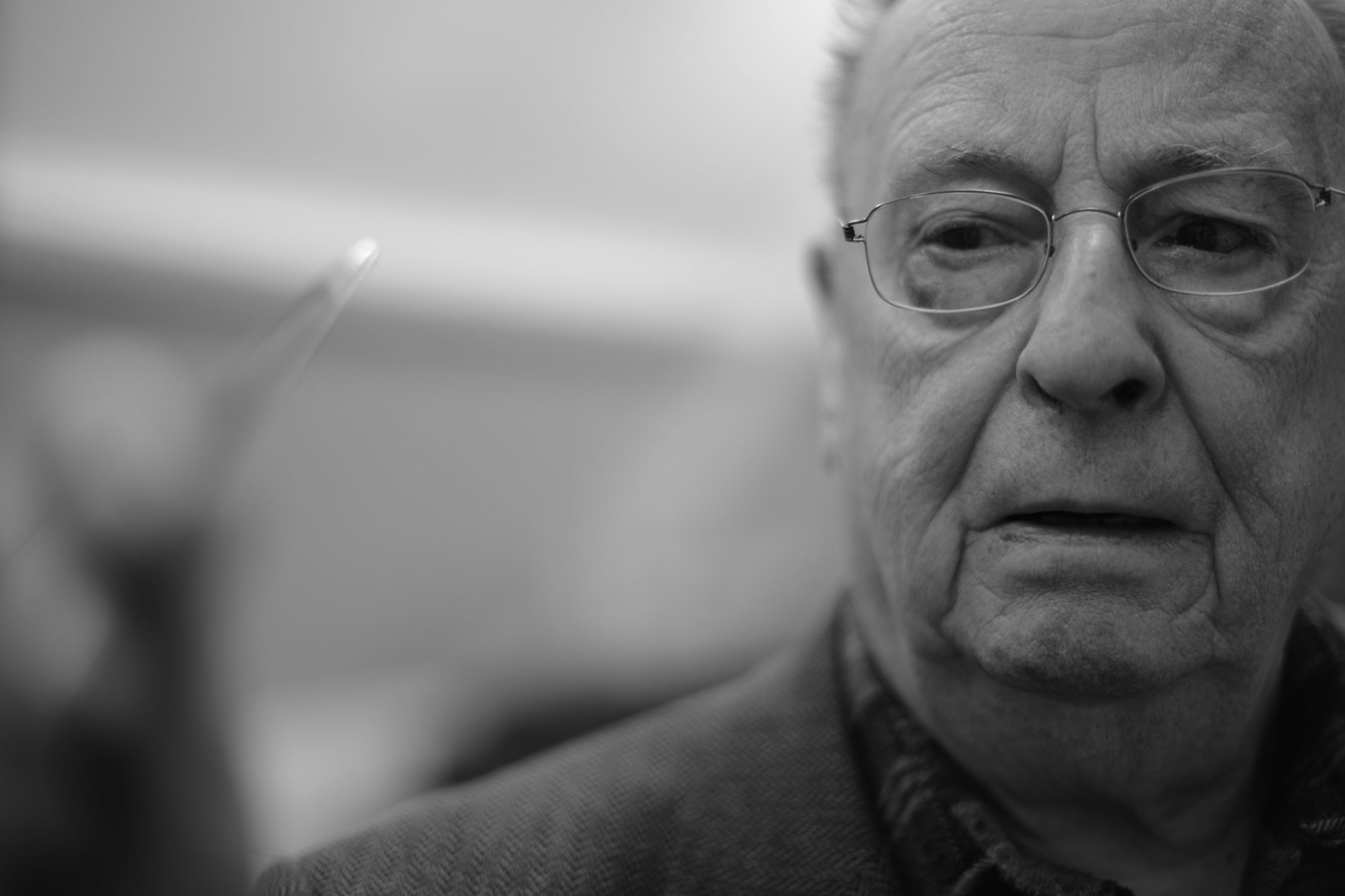
- Born: Jacobus Westerik; 2 March 1924; The Hague, Netherlands
- Died: 10 September 2018 (aged 94); Rotterdam, Netherlands

Jacobus "Co" Westerik (2 March 1924 – 10 September 2018) was a Dutch visual artist.

== Life and work ==
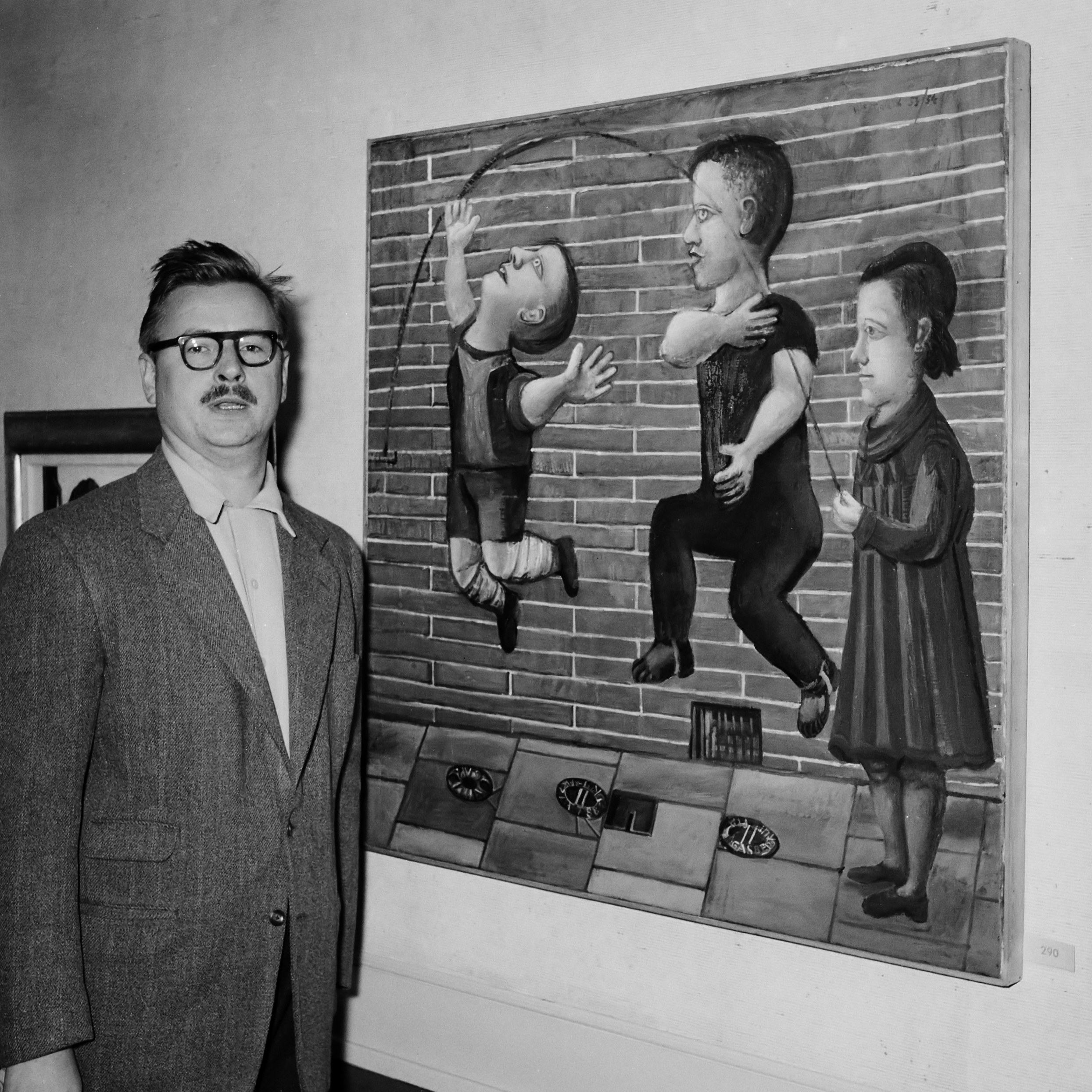
Westerik in 1955

Born in The Hague on 2 March 1924, Westerik received his education at the Royal Academy of Art, The Hague from 1942 to 1947. After his graduation he made a study trip to the United States in 1948. After his return to the Netherlands, he settled as an independent artist in The Hague. With the artists Herman Berserik, Jan van Heel, Willem Hussem and Jaap Nanninga he participated in the Verve group, which they founded in 1951 and dissolved in 1957.

From 1954 to 1958, Westerik was lecturer at the International School and the German International School, and from 1955 to 1958 also at the Vrije Academie voor Beeldende Kunsten in The Hague. From 1958 to 1971, he was a lecturer in figure drawing at the Royal Academy of Art, The Hague. Between 1960 and 1970, Westerik also lectured at Ateliers '63 in Haarlem. In 1971, he moved to Rotterdam, and started a studio in the south of France, where he worked alternately until 2010.

Westerik was awarded the Jacob Maris Prize three times: in 1951 and 1955 for painting and in 1953 for drawing. He also received the Rembrandt Prize of the city of Leiden, the State Prize for Visual Arts and Architecture, Cultural Prize of South Holland and the Hendrik Chabot Price of the Prins Bernhard Cultuurfonds. In 1999, he was appointed Knight of the Order of the Netherlands Lion and in 2005 an honorary member of Pulchri Studio.

Westerik died on 10 September 2018 in Rotterdam at the age of 94.
