= New Hague School (visual arts) =

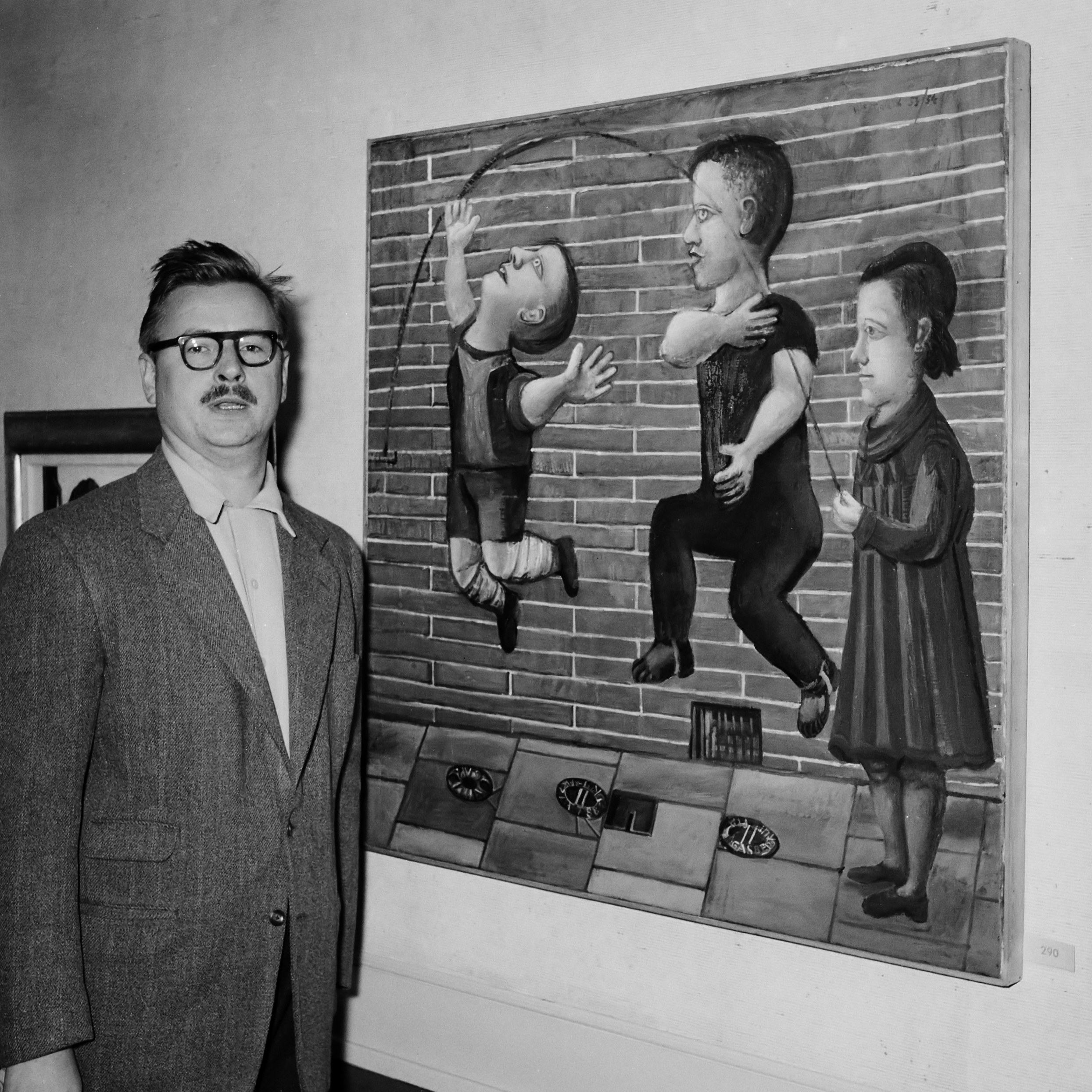
Co Westerik in 1955

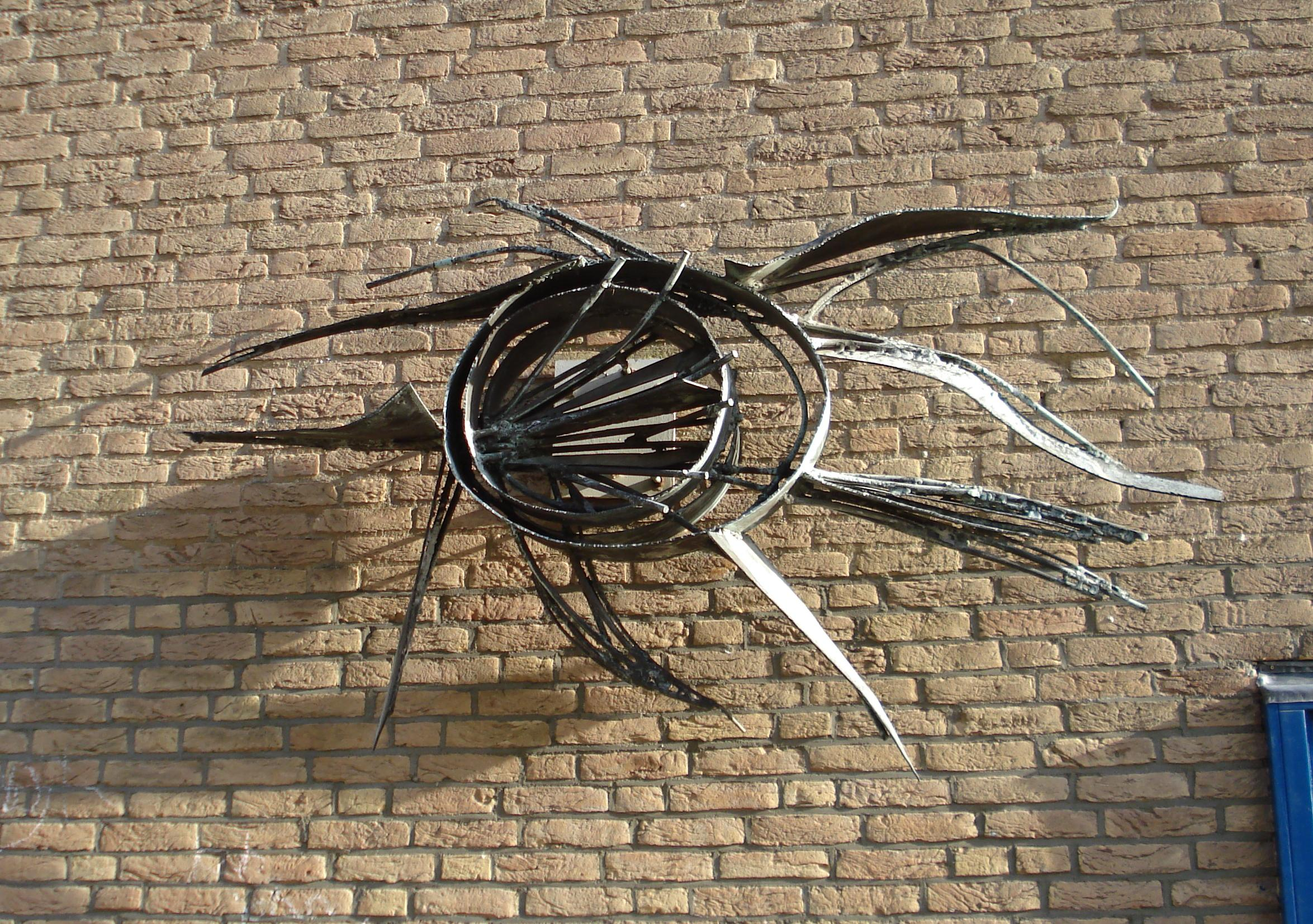
Sculpture Sun, The Hague 1961, by Aart van den IJssel, one of the members of the Posthoorn-group

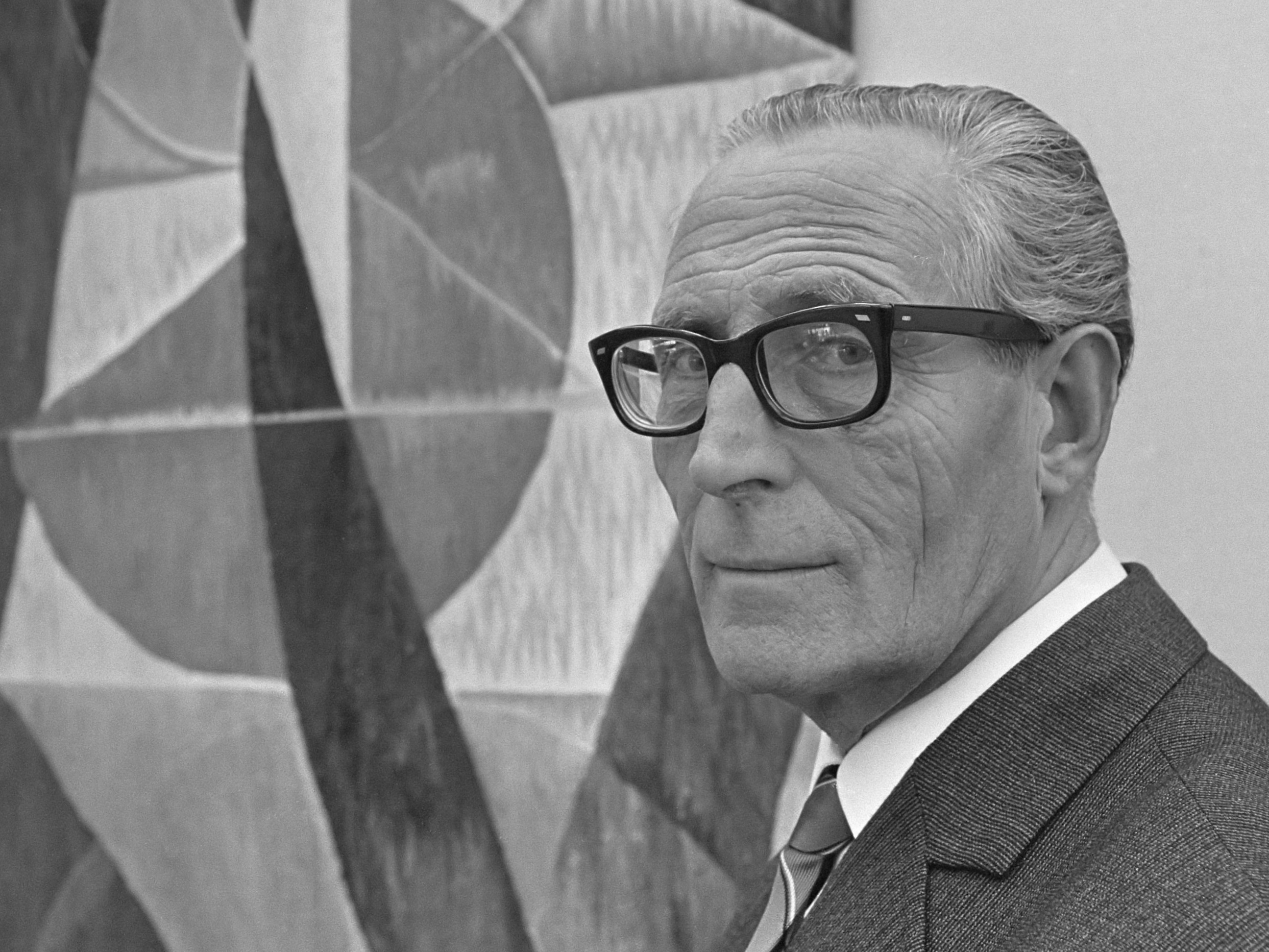
Chris de Moor joined Fugare in 1962.

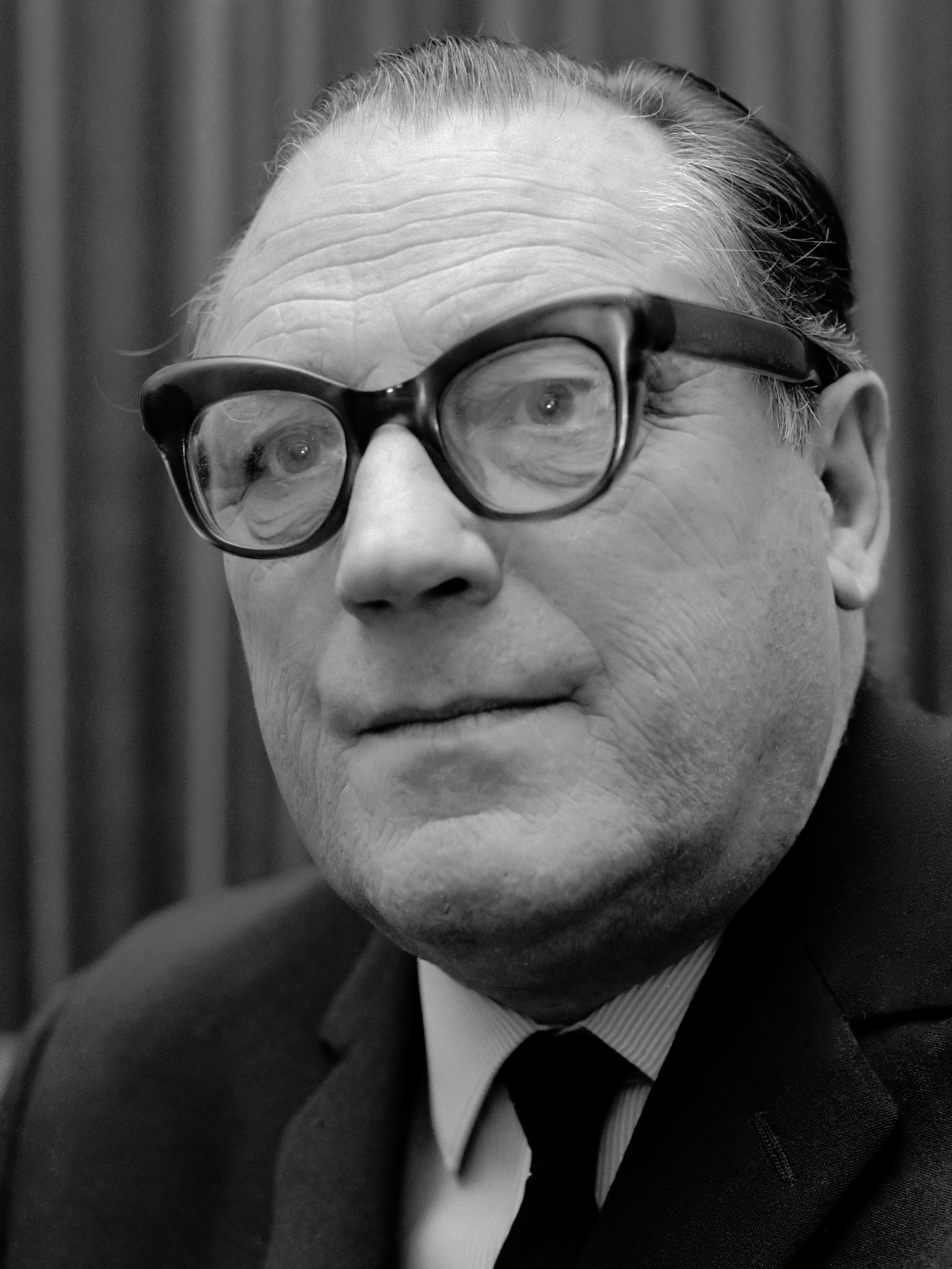
Willem Hussem took part in Verve and Fugare.

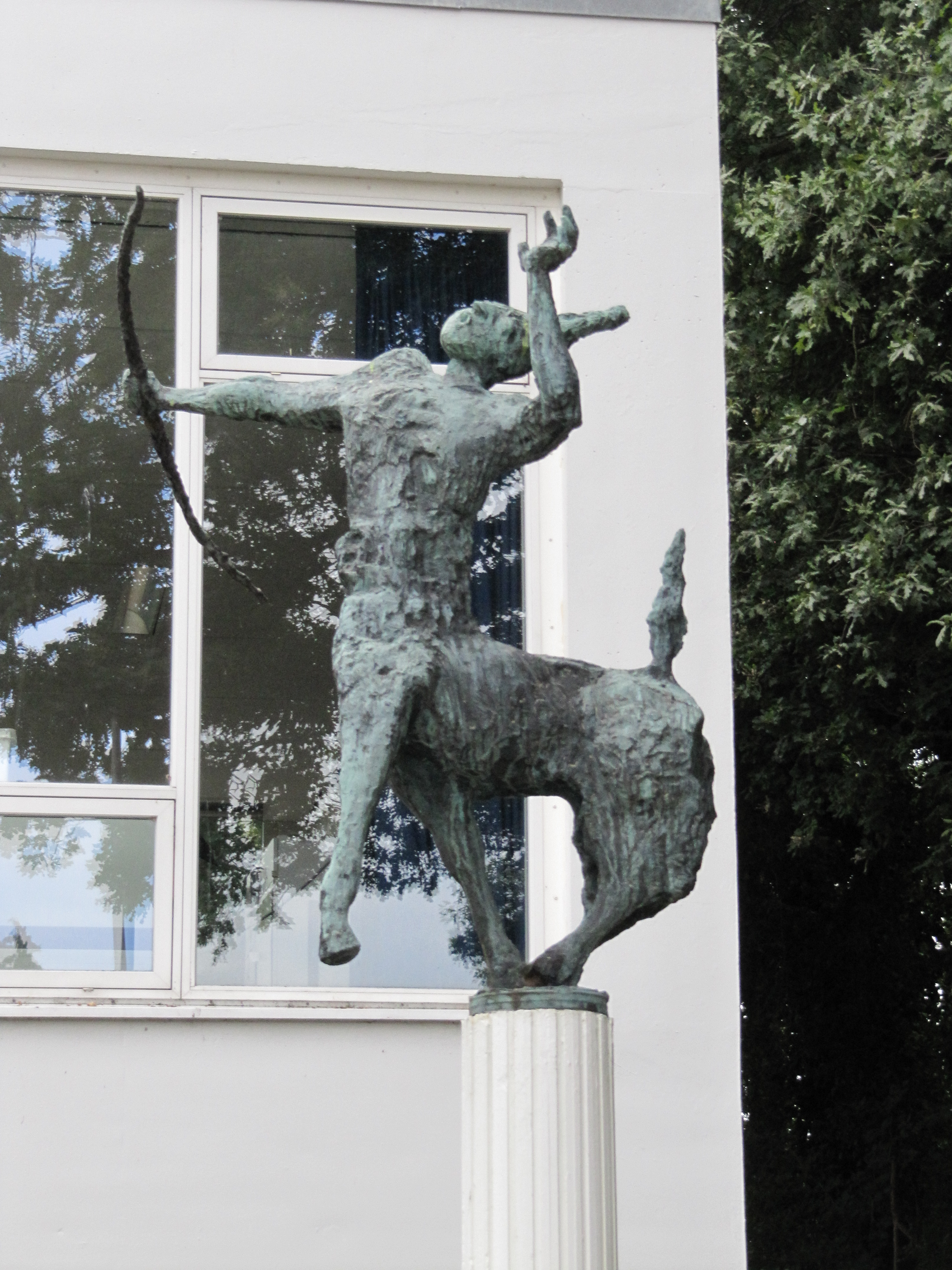
1960 sculpture by Theo van der Nahmer, who also took part in Verve and Fugare

The New Hague School (Dutch Nieuwe Haagse School) was a movement in the Dutch fine arts of the 1950s and 60s. It opposed the Cobra avant-garde movement and found its inspiration in 17th-century art and the experiences of the Barbizon School and the resulting Hague School.

== History ==
Immediately after the Second World War The Hague artists came up with their own renewal in painting in addition to the experimental Cobra movement. In 1949 came the first Posthoorn-group, named after the bodega and art gallery named De Posthoorn. The group disbanded in 1962.

In 1951 came the group Verve, or Hague Verve, which focused on The Hague interpretation of the innovations in the School of Paris in modern figurative art. The group ceased to exist in 1957.

As a loose continuation of Verve, the group Fugare was founded in 1960, with an emphasis on non-figurative art. This group existed until 1967.

In 1947 in the then-named Gemeentemuseum Den Haag held an exhibition for artists from The Hague, entitled "Haagse Kunstenaars" (The Hague Artists). This exhibition concept was repeated another eight times, until 1959. Most of the participants were either part of the Verve group, the Fugare group, and/or the Posthoorn-group. These groups were considered to be the main part of the New Hague School. This term was first used by Jos de Gruyter (1899–1979), chief curator of modern art at the Gemeentemuseum Den Haag and later director.

== Participants ==
=== Artists from the Posthoorn-group ===
- Johan van den Berg (born 1939), Jos van den Berg (1905 - 1978), Theo Bitter (1916–1994), Karel Bleijenberg (1913 - 1981), Kees van Bohemen (1928 - 1985), Carolien Boudijn, Amélie de Bourbon (born 1936), Wil Bouthoorn (1916 - 2004), Dirk Bus (1907–1978), Jan Cremer (born 1940), Gerard Fieret (1924 - 2009), Lotti van der Gaag (1923 -2000), Willem Hussem (1900 - 1974), Nol Kroes (1918 - 1976), Joop Kropff (1892 - 1979), Paul Kromjong (1903 - 1973), George Lampe (1921 - 1982), Hans van der Lek (1936 - 2001), Will Leewens (1923 - 1986), Ber Mengels (1921 - 1995), Theo van der Nahmer (1917 - 1989), Jaap Nanninga (1904 - 1962), Jan Olyslager (1926 - 2010), Thijs Overmans (born 1928), Jan Roëde (1914 - 2007), Marianne de Ruiter (1919 - 1990), Willem Schrofer (1898 - 1968), Wim Sinemus (1903 - 1987), Ferry Slebe (1907 - 1994), Arnold Smith (1905 - 1995), Meike Sund (born 1923), Gerard Verdijk (1934 - 2005), Aat Verhoog (born 1933), Joop Vreugdenhil (1904 - 1969), Karel Wiggers (1916 - 1989), Frans de Wit (1901 - 1981), Aart van den IJssel (1922 - 1983)

=== The Verve group ===
The painters:

- Kees Andrea (1914 - 2006), Hannie Bal (1921), Herman Berserik (1921 - 2002), Theo Bitter (1916 - 1994), Quirine Collard (1920 - 1963), Rein Draijer (1899 - 1986), Jan van Heel (1898 - 1990), Nol Kroes (1918 - 1976), Willem Minderman (1910 - 1985), Henk Munnik (1912 – 1997), Rinus van der Neut (1910 - 1999), Willem Schrofer (1898 - 1968), Ferry Slebe (1907 – 1994), Frans Vollmer (1913 - 1961), Co Westerik (1924) en Frans de Wit (1901 - 1981).

And the sculptors:

- Hubert Bekman (1896 - 1974), Dirk Bus (1907 - 1978), Theo van der Nahmer (1917 – 1989), Rudi Rooijackers (1920 - 1998) en Bram Roth (1916 – 1995).

Artists, that later joined the group:

- Wil Bouthoorn (1916 - 2004), George Lampe (1921 - 1982), Christiaan de Moor (1899 – 1981) en Aart van den IJssel (1922 - 1983).

=== The Fugare group ===
- Theo Bitter, Harry Disberg, Jan van Heel, Willem Hussem, Nol Kroes, Joop Kropff, George Lampe, Christiaan de Moor, Theo van der Nahmer, Jaap Nanninga, Wim Sinemus, Gerard Verdijk, Frans de Wit and Aart van den IJssel.

=== Contemporaries ===
Some of contemporary artists, which can be considered part of the New Hague School, but didn't joined Verve, Fugare and the Posthoorn-group, such as:

- Kees Andréa, Livinus van de Bundt, Paul Citroen, Harm Kamerlingh Onnes, Toon Kelder, Piet Ouborg, Willem Rozendaal, Albert Termote, Jules Vermeire, Kees Verschuren, and Toon Wegner.

Furthermore, also some of the contemporaries, who exhibited at the art gallery De Posthoorn, such as:

- Johan van den Berg, Karel Beijenberg, Thaddeus van Eijsden, Jan Goeting, Hens de Jong, Jan Kuiper, Thijs Overmans, Harry Verburg, Karel Wiggers and Ans Wortel.

== See also ==
- Haagse Kunstkring
- Hague School
- Pulchri Studio
