= Hugo Tutein Nolthenius =

Dutch art collector (1863–1944)

Hugo Tutein Nolthenius (Amsterdam, August 2, 1863 - Delft, December 12, 1944) was a Dutch industrialist and art collector.

== Professional life ==
Son of Julius Hendrik Tutein Nolthenius [b. 1824] and Elizabeth Maria Weymar [b. 1825], Tutein Nolthenius was born in Amsterdam on August 2, 1863. From 1878 to 1881, Tutein Nolthenius worked at the "De Atlas" factory. He became the director in 1898.

== Art collecting ==
Tutein Nolthenius collected art. His collection included oriental ceramics and jade, as well as artworks by Vincent van Gogh, Johan Thorn Prikker and Isaac Israëls. He was advised by Dutch art critic H.P. Bremmer.

In 1912, he lent four Van Goghs from his collection to the Sonderbund Exhibition in Cologne.

== Family ==
He had a brother, Jacques Tutein Nolthenius and a nephew, William, who inherited parts of his collection.
