= Bon Ingen-Housz =

Dutch sculptor

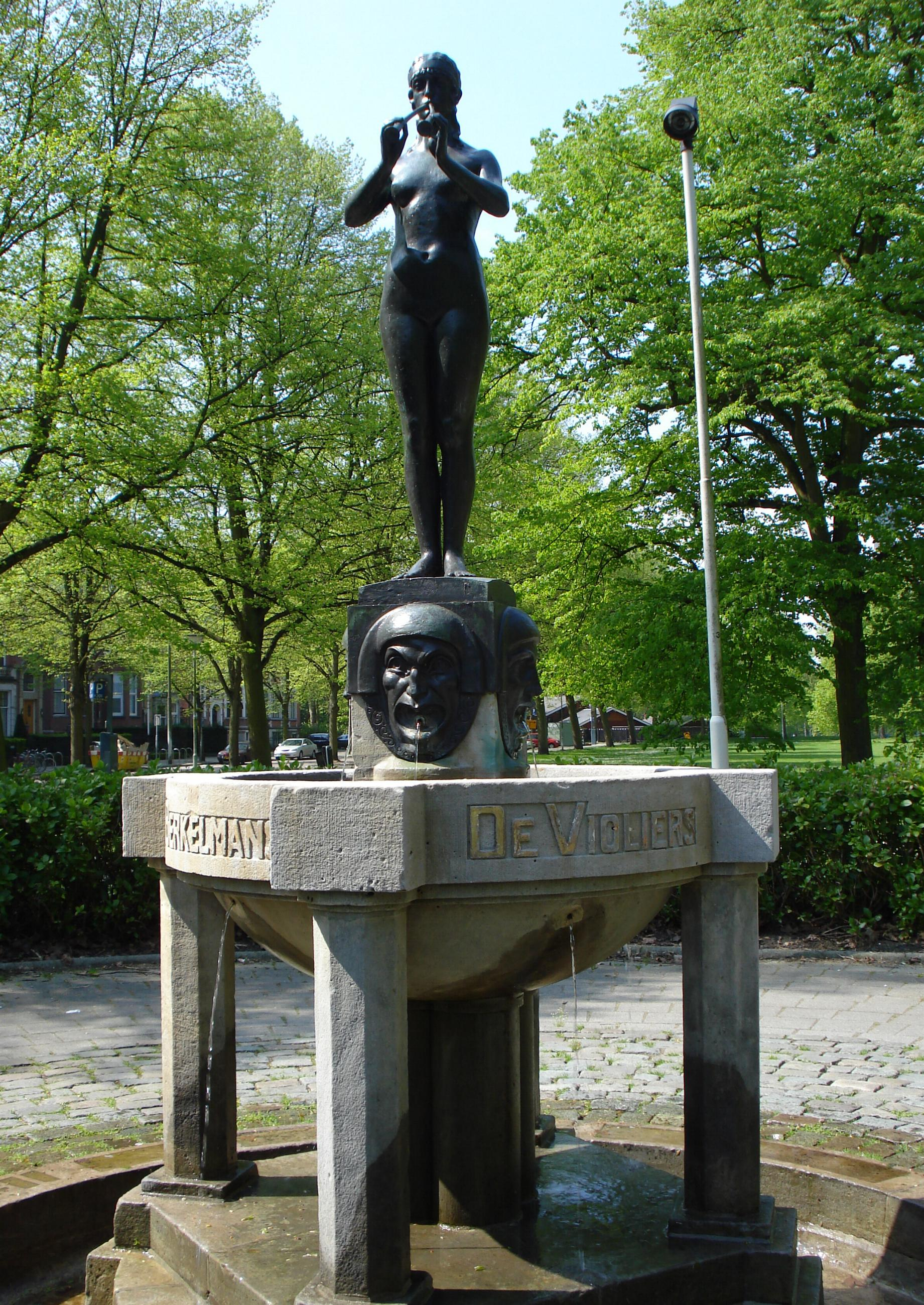

Bonaventura Alphonsus Maria (Bon) Ingen-Housz (also Bon Ingenhousz, 25 April 1881 in Breda – 16 December 1953 in Breda) was a Dutch sculptor.

Bon Ingen-Housz (also called BMA Ingen-Housz, MA Ingen-Housz, or Bon Ingenhousz or Bon Ingen Housz) came from the prominent family Ingen Housz in Breda, which mainly consisted of bankers and doctors. He received his training as a sculptor at the Rijksakademie van beeldende kunsten in Amsterdam.

Ingen-Housz worked on several large sculpture projects in Amsterdam (Stedelijk Museum (Amsterdam) and the Van Heutsz-Monument), in The Hague and in Rotterdam. Ingen-Housz was a lecturer at the Royal Academy of Art in The Hague from 1918 to 1946.

In 1908 Ingen-Housz was the winner of the Dutch Prix de Rome.

One of his students was Dirk Bus.
