= Aart van den IJssel =

Dutch sculptor, painter and draftsman

- Aart van den IJssel
- Born: The Hague

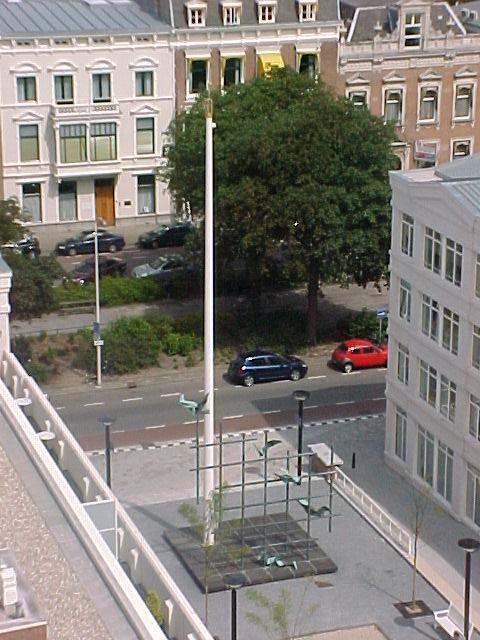
Aart van den IJssel's Irenemonument in The Hague

Aart van den IJssel (17 December 1922 in The Hague – 2 December 1983 in Voorburg) was a Dutch sculptor, painter and draftsman.

Van den IJssel is known for his sculptures of animals (especially insects and birds) and horses. His work is in the public space in The Hague, Voorburg and several other places in the Netherlands.

Van den IJssel was successively a member of the Pulchri Studio. In his fifties he was a member of the De Nieuwe Ploeg in Voorburg. In 1961 he received the Jacob Marisprijs given to those members of the Pulchri Studio.

His last exhibition was in Pulchri in 1982. Coinciding with the opening of this exhibition was a biography of Van den IJssel in the series Het Haags Palet, written by Saskia Gras. Van den IJssel died in 1983.
