= Teun Roosenburg =

Dutch sculptor (1916–2004)

- Roosenburg, 1994
- Born: Jacob Martijn Roosenburg; 9 July 1916; The Hague, Netherlands
- Died: 15 July 2004 (aged 88); Eijsden, Limburg, Netherlands
- Education: Royal Academy of Art, The Hague
- Spouse: Jopie Roosenburg-Goudriaan
- Father: Dirk Roosenburg

Jacob Martijn Roosenburg (9 July 1916 – 15 July 2004), better known as Teun Roosenburg, was a Dutch sculptor. The son of the architect Dirk Roosenburg, he attended the Royal Academy of Art in the Hague and the Académie Ranson in Paris. He worked with several materials, depicting various subjects in a figurative style. He and his wife Jopie occupied the Oost Castle from 1941, from which they led an art colony.

== Early life ==
Roosenburg was born in the Hague on 9 July 1916. The son of the architect Dirk Roosenburg, he initially studied architecture and furniture-making. One day, a teacher discovered a caricature he had drawn. Initially fearing that he would be punished, Roosenburg was instead brought to a drawing club. In 1936, he enrolled at the Royal Academy of Art in the Hague, where he apprenticed under Albert Termote. By 1939 he was living in the Jordaan neighbourhood of Amsterdam, often working with glass or terracotta to create figurative works; these included several ornaments for his father's buildings. He later attended the Académie Ranson in Paris, studying under Charles Malfray and Aristide Maillol.

Following the Nazi occupation of the Netherlands in 1940, Roosenburg sought a means of practising his art without registering with the newly established Nederlandsche Kultuurkamer (Chamber of Dutch Culture). With his peers Hanni Rädecker and Piet Damsté, he thus travelled in 1942 to Eijsden in South Limburg. After two weeks wandering the countryside seeking lodgings, he was able to rent Oost Castle for fifty guilders per month. An art colony developed at the castle, under the leadership of Roosenburg and his girlfriend Jopie Goudriaan, whom he married in 1943.

Seeking to protect the community, which was transporting money for the Resistance and using the castle's proximity to Belgium to facilitate the emigration of Jewish refugees, Roosenburg urged residents of the castle to dress as crazily as possible. As narrated by Nicolaas Wijnberg, a resident during the period, members of the colony "put on strange hats and caps, painted our shoes, and when we went outside we deliberately stared a lot and dreamily at the landscape and the cloudy sky". (Note: Original: "... zetten rare hoeden en petten op, beschilderden onze schoenen en als we buiten hepen staarden we opzettelijk veel en dromerig naar het landschap en naar de wolkenhemel, opdat anderen maar zouden denken".) Food for the community, as well as those it assisted, was obtained in exchange for art. After the liberation of Eijsden, the colony hosted some two hundred American soldiers, who put on a pancake breakfast.

== Later career ==
The Roosenburgs bought Oost Castle in 1957. and Teun sought to protect the landscapes that his wife often painted. He opposed, for instance, the construction of a refinery in Ternaaien. Over the ensuing decades, he and Jopie often hosted parties for their fellow artists, writers, and musicians, with guests including the painter Hermanus Berserik, the journalist Anton Koolhaas (Teun's brother-in-law), and the writer Cola Debrot. At the same time, he continued to work.

In March 1957, Roosenburg contributed several sculptures to an exhibition of Limburger artists in Heerlen. A reviewer for De Maasbode noted that Roosenburg excelled in garden sculpture, highlighting his standing and reclining nudes; also mentioned were the "humorous" Spaanse Ruiters ("Spanish Riders") and the metaphoric war memorial De Stier ("The Bull"). That year, Roosenburg also completed a relief for the new H. J. Lovink Pumping Station. Titled Land en Water ("Land and Water"), it depicts a landward farmer and seaward fisherman shaking hands over a dyke. In its description of the rijksmonument, the Ministry of Education, Culture and Science describes this tableau as highlighting the station's significance in creating new agricultural land from the seabed.

After the Doctor J.H. Hansen Hospital began construction in Emmeloord in 1962, Roosenburg was commissioned to create a sculpture for its main entrance. He thus completed Thuiskomst ("Homecoming"), which depicts a male patient, supported by a doctor, being discharged to his wife and dog. Roosenburg held several joint exhibitions with Jopie. One, at the Heerlen City Hall in April 1960, included more than sixty sculptures and paintings by the couple, as well as some ceramics. By 1982, he had held expositions in Paris, Aachen, Amsterdam, Maastricht, and Heerlen.

In his sculpture, Roosenburg employed a figurative approach that Bob Frommé of Het Parool described as "old-fashioned in the best sense of the word: classic". (Note: Original: "Ouderwets in de goede zin van het woord: klassiek.") He was critical of more abstract approaches to art, disliking the works of Alberto Giacometti. He sought to maintain balance, arguing that "realism without interpretation is death in art, but without figurativism there is little but empty aesthetic." (Note: Original: "Realisme zonder interpretatie is de dood in de kunst, maar zonder figuratie blijft er niet veel anders over dan lege estethiek.")

Roosenburg was made a knight in the Order of Orange-Nassau in 1994; by this time, he had served as the chairman of the Limburg Association of Visual Artists. He died in Eijsden on 15 July 2004 and was buried at Tongerseweg Cemetery in Maastricht. He was predeceased by Jopie, who died in 1996. They had three children: Joost, Albert, and Olivier. The latter two became artists.

== Gallery ==
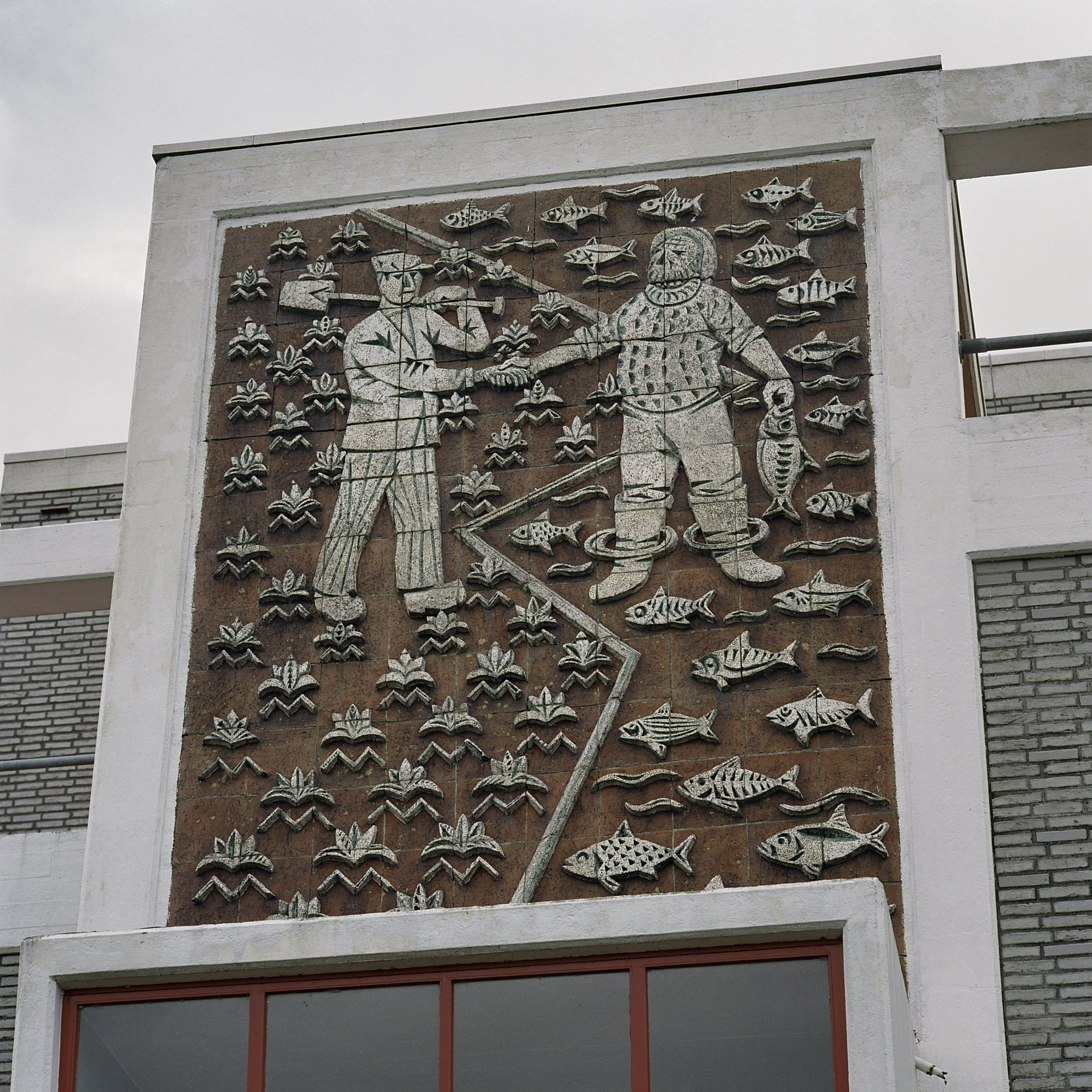
Land en Water ("Land and Water", Biddinghuizen, 1957)

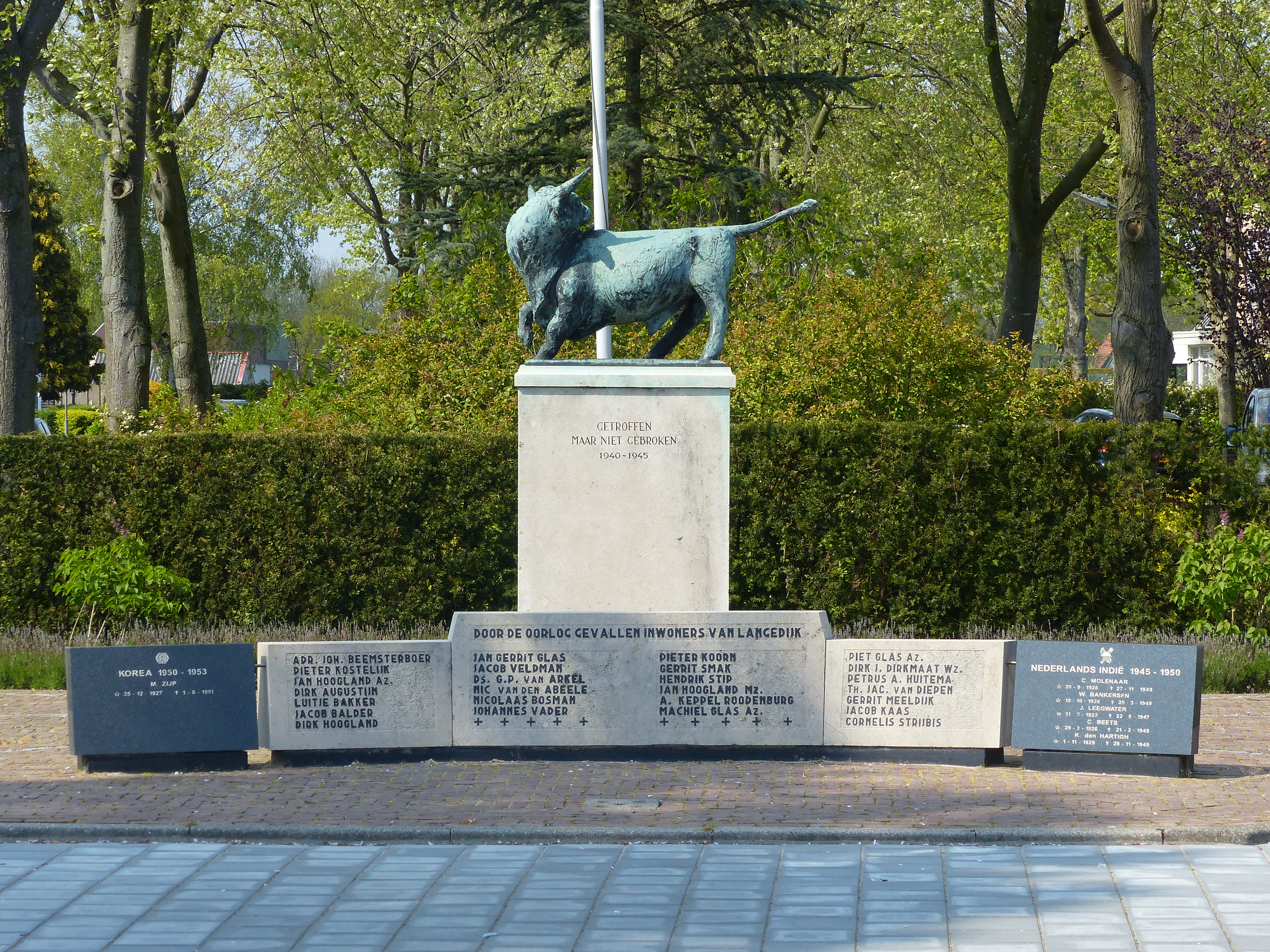
De Stier ("The Bull", Noord-Scharwoude, 1957)

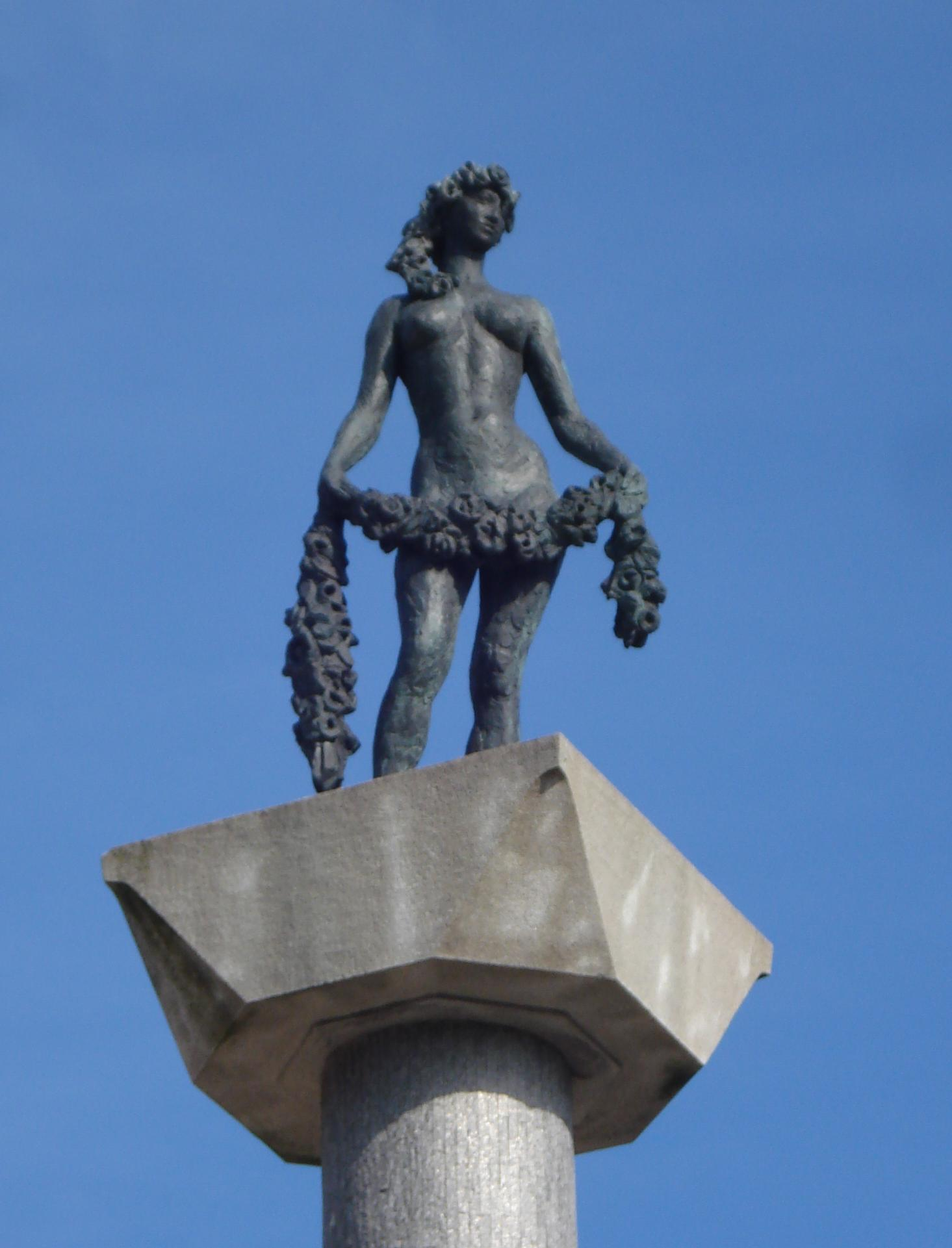
Flora (Aalsmeer, 1962)

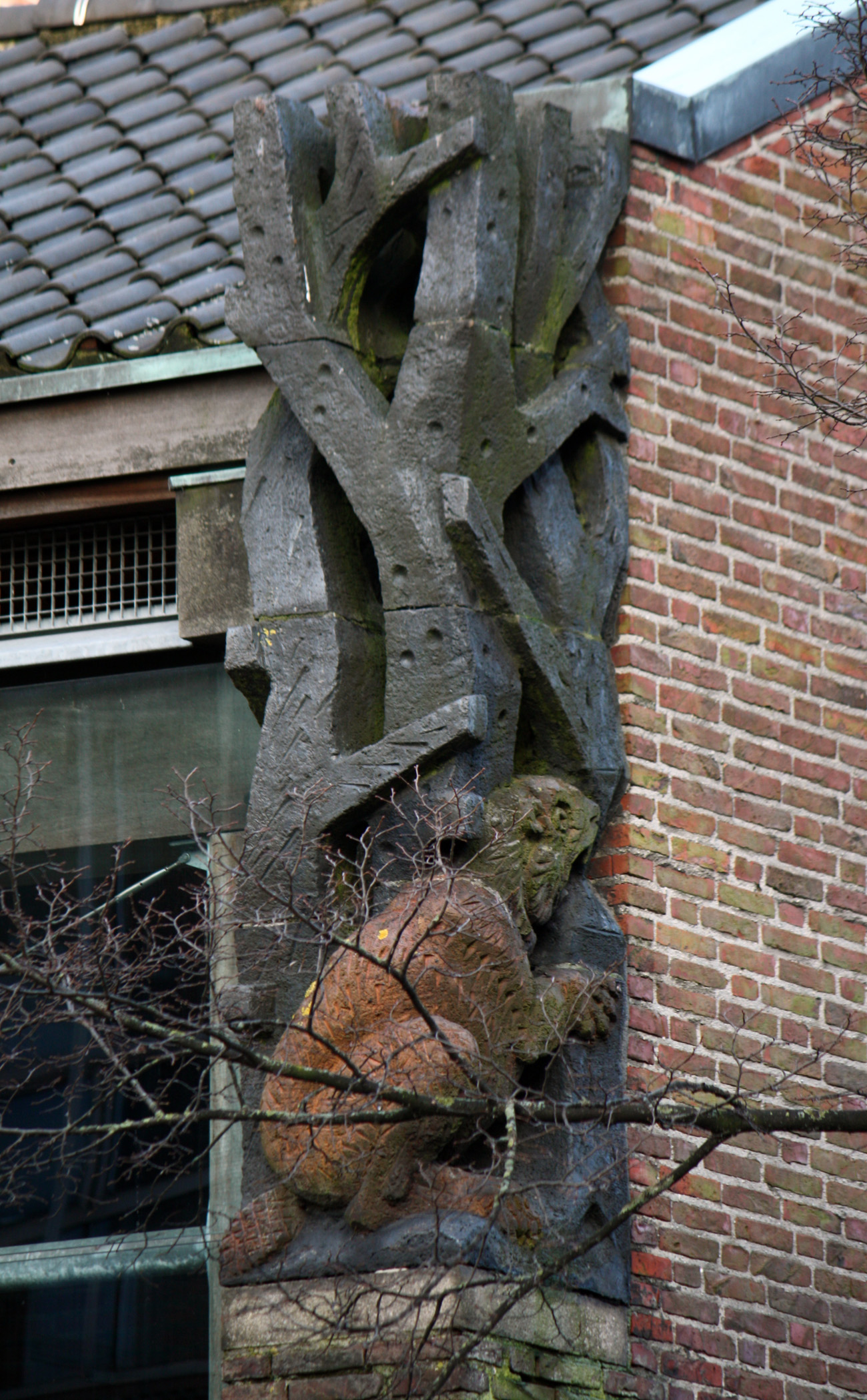
Bever ("Beaver", Groningen, 1964)

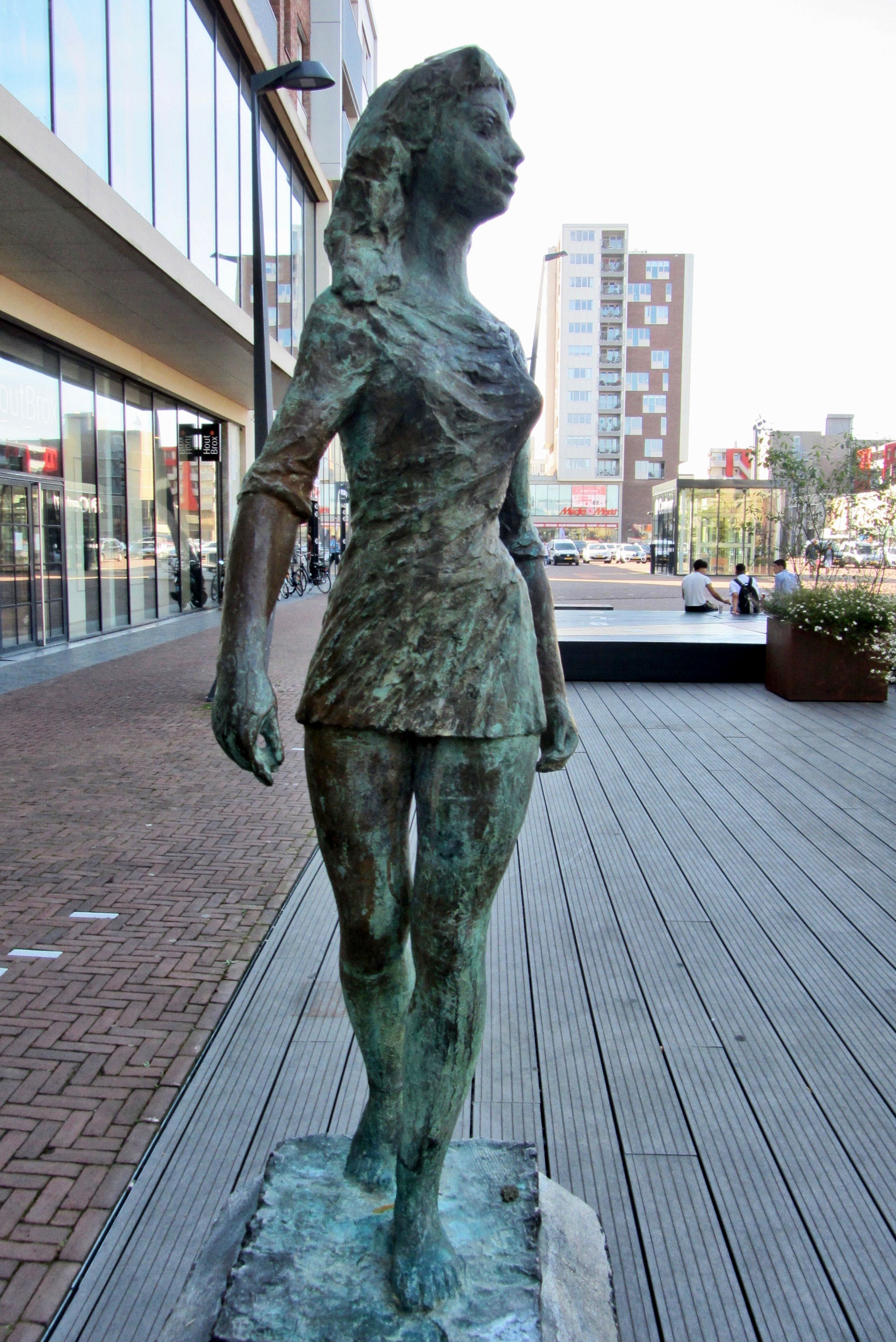
Meisje in Mini ("Girl in a Mini", Smallingerland, 1971)

== Works cited ==
- "Expositie 'Terug naar Kasteel Oost'" [Exposition 'Return to Oost Castle'] (in Dutch). Museum Valkenburg. Archived from the original on 25 June 2022.
- Fromme, Bob (29 April 1986). "Een Kunstenaarsechtpaar met Dorstige Vrienden" [An Artist Couple with Thirsty Friends]. Het Parool (in Dutch). Amsterdam. p. 13.
- "Gemaal H.J. Lovink" [H.J. Lovink Pumping Station]. Rijksmonumentenregister (in Dutch). Ministry of Education, Culture and Science. Archived from the original on 10 December 2023.
- Haimon, Paul (2 November 1974). "Kijken met Paul Haimon, Bij Jopie Roosenburg" [Watch with Paul Haimon: Jopie Roosenburg]. Limburgsch Dagblad (in Dutch). Heerlen. p. 38.
- "Jeanne Oostingprijs voor Jopie Roosenburg" [Jeanne Oosting Prize for Jopie Roosenburg]. Limburgsch Dagblad (in Dutch). Heerlen. 13 December 1975. p. 15.
- "Jopie en Teun Roosenburg Kunstenaars-echtpaar exposeert te Heerlen" [Jopie and Teun Roosenburg hold Exposition in Heerlen]. Limburgsch Dagblad (in Dutch). Heerlen. 5 April 1960. p. 13.
- "Jopie Roosenburg-Goudriaan" (in Dutch). Netherlands Institute for Art History. Archived from the original on 10 June 2024.
- Laudy, Yvonne (30 November 1991). "De Gongevaarlijke 'Gekken' van Kasteel Oost" [The Harmless 'Madmen' of Oost Castle]. De Telegraaf (in Dutch). Amsterdam. p. 25.
- "Limburgse Kunstenaars als Kasteelbewoner" [Limburger Artists as Castleowners]. Limburgsch Dagblad (in Dutch). Heerlen. 22 December 1956. p. 11.
- K.S. (2 March 1957). "Ruimhartigheid der Limburgse beeldhouwers" [Generosity of Limburger Sculptors]. De Maasbode (in Dutch). Rotterdam. p. 5.
- "Land en Water" [Land and Water]. Flevoland Heritage (in Dutch). Fleurbaaij Kunst & Cultuur. Archived from the original on 27 September 2023.
- "Roosenburg". Limburgsch Dagblad (in Dutch). Heerlen. 10 September 1982. p. 2.
- "Roosenburg ridder" [Roosenburg – Knight]. Limburgsch Dagblad (in Dutch). Heerlen. 30 April 1994. p. 19.
- "Thuiskomst" [Homecoming]. Flevoland Heritage (in Dutch). Fleurbaaij Kunst & Cultuur. Archived from the original on 10 June 2024.
