= Stichting Cassandra =

Dutch foundation

- Formation: 2020
- Founder: Pieke Roelofs
- Founded at: Maastricht, Netherlands
- Type: Non Profit Organisation
- Legal status: Foundation
- Region served: Global
- Official language: English, Dutch, French, Norwegian, German
- Website: stichtingcassandra.nl

Stichting Cassandra is a Dutch foundation that defends the interests of victims of sexual and psychological violence. The foundation currently publishes its work in five languages.

== History ==
Stichting Cassandra was founded in 2020 by whistleblower Pieke Roelofs as a result of her own experiences with abuse, the police, and the legal system. Roelofs stated that the systematic failure in sexual violence cases and failure of the government to protect victims "must stop", and that the Dutch government did "not only put victims in danger, but also society." The foundation has its registered office in Maastricht.

In March 2020, the foundation demonstrated at an International Women's Day March, raising attention for the fact that The Netherlands has not legally defined sex without consent as rape, urging minister of Justice Ferdinand Grapperhaus in De Limburger to “hurry up” with the proposed new rape laws.

In May 2020, masked activists of the foundation protested at Vrijthof in Maastricht using ultraviolet lights and neon balloons spelling 'Mask for Justice', raising awareness on the increase of domestic violence as a result of COVID-19 isolation.

In August 2020, the foundation responded to a Dutch government consultation about the proposed new sex crime laws in the Netherlands, warning about the low prosecution number of rapists in the country. The foundation also stated that in the first 3 quarters of 2019, only 37% of reports of rape to the police led to a criminal complaint. It was added that in October 2019, according to police sources, 945 rape cases had been pending for longer than six months, 90 of which for longer than two years.

The foundation criticised the fact that since 2017 the maximum sentence of 12 years in prison had never been demanded in a rape case; the highest sentence imposed was 6 years, the lowest 21 days, and on average a rapist was jailed for a year and 5 months. The foundation highlighted that Meldpunt Kinderporno received approximately 300,000 reports of online child sexual abuse materials in 2019, which was 'an increase of 38 percent: the previous year, the number of reports increased by 45 percent'. Concerning consent, Stichting Cassandra stated that "what matters in abuse cases is whether facts and circumstances have made it impossible for the victim to freely determine their will", whether the perpetrator "abused this" or that the perpetrator even "deliberately created this situation". According to the foundation, "in an amendment to the law, the existence, abuse and/or deliberate influence of those power dynamics should be elaborated and put at the center of consideration". Stichting Cassandra criticised newly introduced terminology "sexual interaction against the will" by minister Ferdinand Grapperhaus in the proposed law reform, referring to it as an example of "contempt and disregard" towards victims and that the choice of words "shifts the focus of the offender on something that happens between the offender and the victim" as well as that the "reality of being abused" is no longer mentioned, stating the choice of words was "neutralizing" abuse and "secondarily traumatizing" for victims. The foundation said, among others, seeing the terminology "sexual interaction" above sex crime articles concerning abuse of children, made them 'gag'.
