= Jopie Roosenburg-Goudriaan =

Dutch painter (1913–1996)

- Self Portrait, undated
- Born: Johanna Margaretha Alida Goudriaan; 27 May 1913; Rotterdam, Netherlands
- Died: 13 October 1996 (aged 83); Eijsden, Limburg, Netherlands
- Spouse: Teun Roosenburg

Johanna Margaretha Alida Roosenburg-Goudriaan (27 May 1913 – 13 October 1996), better known as Jopie Roosenburg-Goudriaan, was a Dutch painter. Born in Rotterdam, South Holland, she attended the Academy of Art in that city and opened a studio by 1938. After it was destroyed during the German bombing of 1940, she moved to Oost Castle in Eijsden, where she married Teun Roosenburg and led an art colony. She worked primarily with oils and watercolours, favouring landscapes and still lifes. She won the Jeanne Oosting Prize in 1975.

== Early life ==
Roosenburg-Goudriaan was born in Rotterdam on 27 May 1913. The daughter of Albert Goudriaan, a shipowner, she expressed interest in art from a young age; she also learned the piano, a hobby that she retained for the rest of her life. She enrolled at the Rotterdam Academy of Art, forming friendships with such artists as Dick Elffers and Henk de Vos as she studied under Johannes Gerardus Heijberg. Her lessons placed great emphasis on realism, such that the "pottery she drew there, you could easily knock to pieces [but] there was not a cent of art in it.". (Note: Original "Ze heeft er potten getekend, die kun je zo kapot stoten. Maar er is geen cent kunst bij.".) In 1932, she spent a year at the Academy of Fine Arts Vienna, where she spent two hours every day painting in the academy square.

By 1938, Roosenburg-Goudriaan had opened her own studio on the Wolfshoek of Rotterdam. Drawing on the figurativist lessons of her Rotterdam professor, she was also inspired by the works of Paul Cézanne, Paul Gauguin, and Henri Matisse. During the German bombing of 1940, her studio was destroyed, burning for three days. She thus decided to start anew, taking a style that diverged from the conventions she had been taught; the painter-cum-illustrator Nicolaas Wijnberg quotes her as saying, "This is my chance to be rid of that damned academy in one fell swoop." (Note: Original: "Dit is mijn kans om in één klap van die verdomde academie afte komen.")

== Oost Castle ==
In 1941, Roosenburg-Goudriaan travelled to Eijsden in South Limburg, on the border between the Netherlands and Belgium. There, an art colony had developed at the Oost Castle under her boyfriend, Teun Roosenburg, who was seeking a means of continuing to work without registering with the Nazi-established Nederlandsche Kultuurkamer (Chamber of Dutch Culture). She quickly began decorating the castle, creating several murals – including a copy of a Picasso still life. The two were married in 1943. During the war, the couple sheltered numerous artists and musicians. In 1957, the couple bought the castle, restoring it thereafter. They had three children: Joost, Albert, and Olivier. The latter two became artists.

Roosenburg-Goudriaan collected numerous pieces of antique furniture and dolls, which she used in her studio. In 1956, she and the Oost Castle community worked on a series of landscapes, completed aboard small boats, that showed views from the sea; however, bouts of seasickness meant that this project was short-lived. She and Teun travelled extensively, and she completed watercolours in France, Spain, Morocco, Ireland and Scotland. She also worked with textiles, completing several tapestries, though she preferred painting.

In style, Roosenburg-Goudriaan's work is characterized by broad strokes and overlapping layers of paint, which the Limburgsch Dagblad described as "fierce and intense" while retaining the spontaneity of art. Her favoured subjects were still lifes and landscapes, particularly the Meuse. Blues are prominent in her landscapes, while her interiors are marked by pinks, yellows, and whites. She worked mostly with oils, but also completed several watercolours; a series of these, completed in Limburg in the 1980s while her husband was abroad, were markedly abstract. She signed her works "JRG".

In recognition of her work, Roosenburg-Goudriaan received a bronze medal at the second Salon Charleroi in 1969 for two paintings of interiors. In 1975, she won the Jeanne Oosting Prize, which had been established by Jeanne Bieruma Oosting five years previously. She and Teun held numerous joint exhibitions; one, held at the Heerlen City Hall in April 1960, included more than thirty of her paintings and thirty of his sculptures.

Roosenburg-Goudriaan died at her home on 13 October 1996. She was buried in a blue coffin.

== Works cited ==
- Alcor (1997). "Schoon Schip" [A Clean Ship]. In Huijnen, R.; Jeukens, W.; Schroen, G. (eds.). Jopie Roosenburg-Goudriaan: Schilderes van het Maasdal [Jopie Roosenburg-Goudriaan: Painter of the Meuse Valley] (PDF). Uit Eijsdens Verleden. Vol. 74–75. Stichting Eijsdens Verleden. p. 21.
- "Expositie 'Terug naar Kasteel Oost'" [Exposition 'Return to Oost Castle'] (in Dutch). Museum Valkenburg. Archived from the original on 25 June 2022.
- Fromme, Bob (29 April 1986). "Een Kunstenaarsechtpaar met Dorstige Vrienden" [An Artist Couple with Thirsty Friends]. Het Parool (in Dutch). Amsterdam. p. 13.
- Haimon, Paul (2 November 1974). "Kijken met Paul Haimon, Bij Jopie Roosenburg" [Watch with Paul Haimon: Jopie Roosenburg]. Limburgsch Dagblad (in Dutch). Heerlen. p. 38.
- Huijnen, R.; Jeukens, W.; Schroen, G., eds. (1997). Jopie Roosenburg-Goudriaan: Schilderes van het Maasdal [Jopie Roosenburg-Goudriaan: Painter of the Meuse Valley] (PDF). Uit Eijsdens Verleden. Vol. 74–75. Stichting Eijsdens Verleden.
- "Jeanne Oostingprijs voor Jopie Roosenburg" [Jeanne Oosting Prize for Jopie Roosenburg]. Limburgsch Dagblad (in Dutch). Heerlen. 13 December 1975. p. 15.
- "Jopie en Teun Roosenburg Kunstenaars-echtpaar exposeert te Heerlen" [Jopie and Teun Roosenburg hold Exposition in Heerlen]. Limburgsch Dagblad (in Dutch). Heerlen. 5 April 1960. p. 13.
- "Jopie Roosenburg-Goudriaan" (in Dutch). Netherlands Institute for Art History. Archived from the original on 10 June 2024.
- Norden, Hans van (1997). "Le Piano d'Ingres" [The Piano of Ingres]. In Huijnen, R.; Jeukens, W.; Schroen, G. (eds.). Jopie Roosenburg-Goudriaan: Schilderes van het Maasdal [Jopie Roosenburg-Goudriaan: Painter of the Meuse Valley] (PDF). Uit Eijsdens Verleden. Vol. 74–75. Stichting Eijsdens Verleden. pp. 16–17.
- "Schilderes Roosenburg wint prijs in Salon Charleroi" [Painter Roosenburg Wins Prize at Salon Charleroi]. De Nieuwe Limburger (in Dutch). Maastricht. 2 May 1969. p. 15.
- "Twee keer Roosenburg" [Twice Roosenburg]. Limburgsch Dagblad (in Dutch). Heerlen. 9 February 1991. p. 2.
- Wijnberg, Nicolaas (1997). "De Gravin van Oost" [The Countess of Oost]. In Huijnen, R.; Jeukens, W.; Schroen, G. (eds.). Jopie Roosenburg-Goudriaan: Schilderes van het Maasdal [Jopie Roosenburg-Goudriaan: Painter of the Meuse Valley] (PDF). Uit Eijsdens Verleden. Vol. 74–75. Stichting Eijsdens Verleden. pp. 7–10.
