= Hillenraad Castle =

Castle near Swalmen, Roermond, Netherlands

- Roermond, Limburg
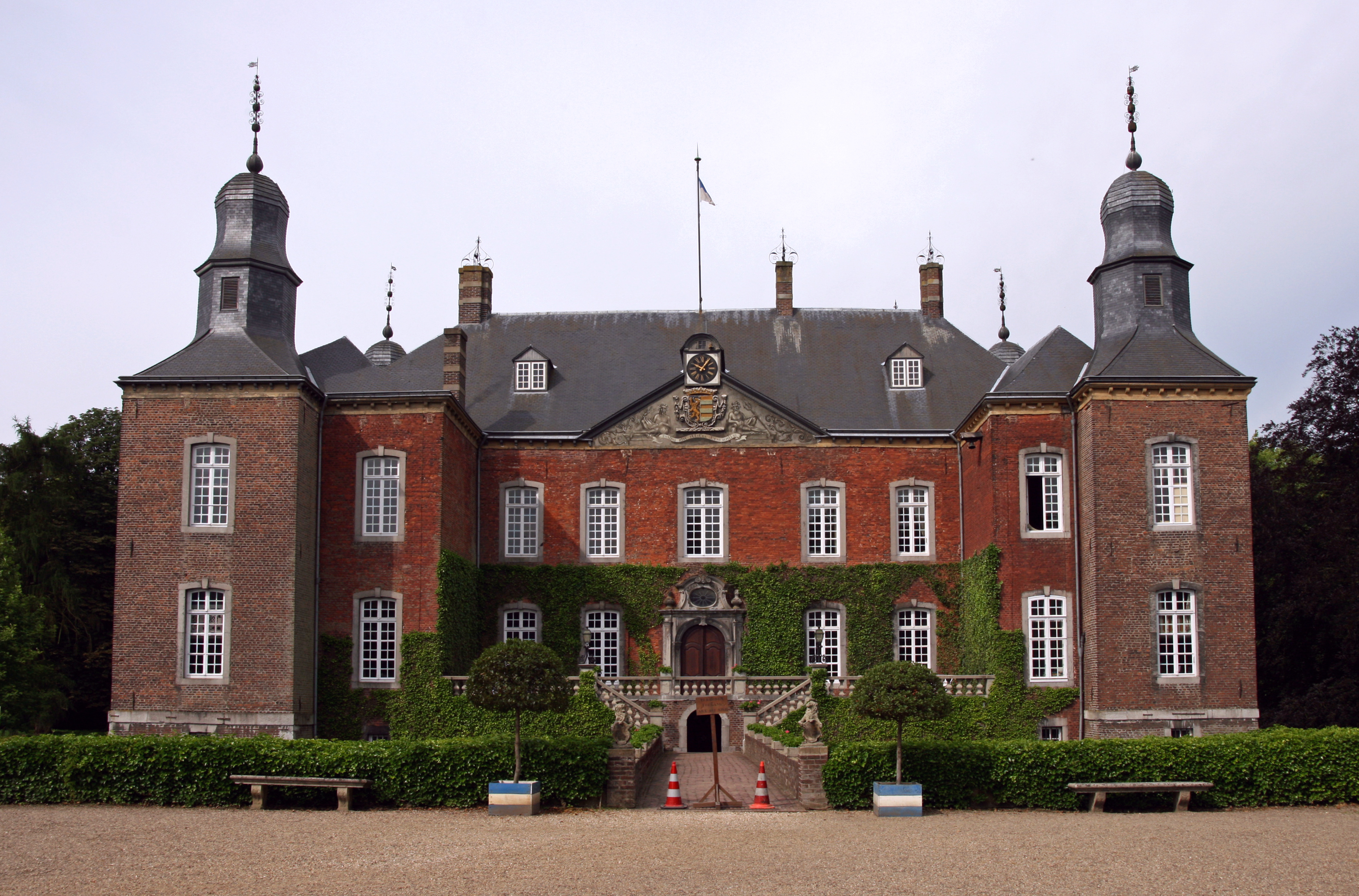

Location
- Coordinates: 51.2215°N 6.0340°E

Hillenraad Castle (Dutch: Kasteel Hillenraad [kɑˈsteːl ˈɦɪlə(n)ˌraːt]; Limburgish: Kesjteel Hilleraod [kəˈʃteːl ˈɦɪləʀɔːt]) is a 14th century square water castle located on the south side of Swalmen in the municipality of Roermond in the province of Limburg. The castle is located in the middle of an estate near the village of Boukoul. It consists of a moated main building with four corner towers, an outer castle, several outbuildings, and a castle park. Hillenraad Castle has been a protected national monument since 1970. The entire complex consists of twenty separate entries in the national monument register, including the main building, the outbuildings and a number of elements in the park. The castle is not open to the public.

== Origin of the House in Swalmen ==
In 1339 the knight Seger van Swalmen, son of the late Willem van Broeckhuysen, was loaned some lands in Swalmen by Count Dirk van Loon, lord of Heinsberg and Blankenberg. His father Willem had previously pledged six acres to the count in exchange for a loan and this time son Seger had pledged another eight acres, located in Hoppenrade. There is no mention of a castle in this deed. Nevertheless, it is important for the earliest history of the castle, because Hoppenrade later formed a single fief together with the castle.

Hoppenrade is now a piece of land adjacent to the current castle. Because the castle was not yet mentioned in the previous deed, it is likely that the castle was built after 1339 and that the Van Swalmen family still lived at the house called Rathem, later also called Oudborg or Naborch.

The house of Hellenrade was first mentioned in a deed in 1380. At the time, the castle was owned by Didderic van Oest (from the Van Oys family, originating from Oost Castle in Oost-Maarland). Dirk van Oest and his wife Felicitas van Uppey (near Liège) also became owners of various other assets in Swalmen in 1381 through the purchase of Robijn van Swalmen, including the 'Huys' (the Naborch) and a water mill. Dirk's mother was probably a sister of Robijn van Swalmen. In 1379, Dirk was already a witness to a verdict regarding the tributary of Swalmen and Asselt. Seller Robijn, canon of St. Servatius in Maastricht, inherited these goods from his brother Werner van Swalmen. In 1382 Dirk van Oest concluded a treaty with the city of Cologne, which was engaged in a battle against the archbishop there. Dirk promised, among other things, that he would make his castle, which he kept on loan from the Duke of Gelre, available if the city so requested. Six months later, the city and the archbishop reconciled, so that Dirk never had to actually open his castle.

== The Schenck van Nydeggen family ==
Due to the marriage of Isabella van Oest to Arnold Schenck van Nydeggen, Hillenraad passed into the hands of a different family in 1486, a few generations later.

Hillenraad will have looked very different in the 14th century. It was probably little more than a large rectangular house, with a round tower at one corner. This tower is mentioned in a deed from 1607. The tower will have been located on the south corner of the original rectangular castle, where the walls are the least thick. Wall anchors with the year 1648 indicate that the forecourt of Hillenraad underwent changes at the end of the Eighty Years' War and possibly more recently. This renovation will have been carried out on behalf of Dirk Schenck van Nijdeggen and his wife Maria d'Oyenbrugge van Duras.

After the death of Dirk Schenck, Hillenraad became the property of son Christoffel Schenck van Nydeggen. In 1655 he bought back the jurisdiction in Swalmen and Asselt from the duke of Gelre, a right that the lords of Swalmen had lost in 1314. With this purchase, the Schenck family, also owners of the Swalmen and Asselt estates, rose strongly in prestige. We know from the death of a bricklayer that Hillenraad was renovated in 1665. At that time the tower may have had to make way for the new banquet hall. In any case, the tower had disappeared in 1668.

== The Margrave family Van Hoensbroeck ==
In 1703, eight-year-old Christoffel Arnold Adriaan Schenck van Nijdeggen was fatally wounded while playing with a loaded rifle. His father, Arnold Schenck, then bequeathed all his possessions to his wife Maria Catharina Margravine van Hoensbroeck. Hillenraad passed on to a cousin in 1736. This cousin Willem Adriaan van Hoensbroeck was already loaned to Hillenraad in 1733. In 1738 he handed over Hillenraad to his son Frans Arnold van Hoensbroeck, who in 1720 was married to Anna Catharina Sophia van Schönborn. They had 25 children together, some of whom were probably stillborn. The alliance crest above the entrance to the orangery in the large castle garden recalls this couple. The Van Hoensbroeck family would remain the owner of the castle for several generations. Hillenraad was rebuilt again under their son Lotharius Frans van Hoensbroeck: in 1766 a roofer died after falling from the roof. Under the Roermond bishop Philip Damiaan Lodewijk van Hoensbroeck, Hillenraad Castle was a center of musical life in the Maasland in the fourth quarter of the 18th century.

== The count's Wolff-Metternich family ==
The last Van Hoensbroeck at Hillenraad Castle was Franz Eugen von und zu Hoensbroech. His marriage to Hermengilde Countess Wolff Metternich remained childless and in 1909 Franz Eugen and his wife handed over the castle and accessories to their cousin Herman Jozef Wolff-Metternich and his wife Von Schall Riaucour. They had the castle restored between 1909 and 1922, whereby the outbuildings in particular were radically changed.

In November 1918, the castle was briefly in world news when the German Crown Prince Wilhelm and his military retinue were interned there. A few days after his father Wilhelm II, the crown prince had crossed the border of the neutral Netherlands and was immediately interned according to the rules of the Hague Convention for neutral countries. After a short time he was transferred to the island of Wieringen.

== Main building, exterior ==
The main building of Hillenraad Castle is 17th and 18th century with a late medieval core. It is a square nobleman's house of brick with three added wings, also built of brick: two on the sides and one centrally placed at the rear. In 1767, four tower-like corner pavilions were added, giving the castle its current appearance. The corner pavilions feature constricted spiers topped by octagonal closed lanterns with bell-shaped endings.

The facades are provided with arched windows with natural stone frames with salient keystones. The façade is crowned in the middle by a stone pediment with the alliance coat of arms of the 17th century couple Schenck of Nydeggen Van Oyenbrugge in relief and painted figures of Zeus and Poseidon. Above the pediment is a clockwork under a curved roof.

Between the side wings at right angles to the facade is a landing, which can be reached via two stairs from the bridge over the castle moat. The landing and stairs have natural stone balustrades, on which two wrought iron lanterns have been placed. From the landing you enter the main floor through the main entrance, a door with a natural stone frame with a gable-shaped top piece with an oval window, flanked by two decorative vases from which flames rise.

== Main building, interior ==
The interior features various stucco ceilings and mantelpieces in Louis XV style. The entrance hall is dominated by a triple staircase. Very special is the banquet hall on the main floor, which has been largely preserved in its original state, and its furnishings are an example of Liège Baroque and Liège-Aachen furniture style from that period. The room can be seen as an 18th-century Gesamtkunstwerk with, among other things, a beautiful plastered ceiling, a parquet floor inlaid with figures, an oak hall paneling with richly decorated paneling.and door and window frames, a carved stone chimney and some antique tapestries . There is gold leather wallpaper in the dining room.

== Outbuildings ==
The outer bailey is built around a spacious forecourt and consists of three perpendicular wings with hipped roofs (17th century, partly rebuilt around 1920). In the center of the north wing is a 17th century sandstone gate frame with diamond heads . The pediment with the painted arms of Wolff Metternich and Schall-Riaucour dates from 1922. The western half of this wing houses a chapel, recognizable by the bell tower on the roof. In the interior there are benches and an altar in 18th century style and some 17th and 18th century mourning plates. The east and south wings are mostly 17th century, except for the roof. In the east wing there is a gate with sandstone frames to the back yard. On the south side of the yard, a presumably 18th-century company building with a pent roof has been built against the east wing. The south wing was shortened around 1920 and converted into a home. On the other side of Hillenraederlaan is an old barn with a curly facade, the front part of which was later converted into a residential house.

A garden pavilion was built in the former vegetable garden in the second quarter of the 18th century. The rectangular building is covered by a hipped roof on which stands a chimney with wrought iron crowning. In the facade on the garden side is a natural stone door frame with the family arms of Van Hoensbroeck and Van Schönborn. Windows with original stone frames have been installed in the rear facade. The interior has a ceiling and a chimney breast with Louis XIV stucco.

== Gardens and estate ==
The garden and park landscaping of the historic Hillenraad country estate has fifteen parts protected by the government, including two bridges, a weir, a few walls with garden ornaments, balustrades, a garden gate, two benches, garden vases, pedestals and statues. In addition to the partly formally landscaped garden, the estate includes a star forest and a few avenues.

== See also ==
- Van Hoensbroeck
