= Roosenburg =

Roosenburg is a Dutch surname. Notable people with the surname include:

- André Roosenburg (1923–2002), Dutch footballer
- Dirk Roosenburg (1887–1962), Dutch architect and designer
- Henriette Roosenburg (1916–1972), Dutch journalist
- Teun Roosenburg (1916–2004), Dutch sculptor, son of Dirk
