= Pieke Roelofs =

Dutch activist, photographer and whistleblower

- Born: November 1989 (age 36); Heerlen, Limburg, Netherlands
- Occupation: Photographer Artist Activist Whistleblower
- Website: http://photoandgrime.com

Pieke Roelofs is a Dutch artist, activist, photographer and whistleblower. In 2019, Roelofs successfully traced the location of a suspect in her own rape case who had previously been unfindable by the police.

In 2020 she founded Stichting Cassandra, a foundation that defends the interests of victims of sexual and psychological violence.

== Life and activism ==
Roelofs was, until the end of 2016, an artist who regularly collaborated with other creative people. Following a collaboration with Exurb1a, a British YouTuber, Roelofs was hospitalised in November 2016 for acute stress disorder, post traumatic stress disorder, depression and suicidal ideation. During her 7-month hospitalisation, Roelofs began speaking out against her former work partner who she stated used Reddit to smear her name. Roelofs said the YouTuber had assaulted and raped her in October 2016, had started threatening her between November–December 2016, and subsequently "blackmailed" her to leave the hospital to talk to him while she was drugged with prescribed medication, and that he raped her while she was unable to fight him. One of the prescribed medications she had been taking was Xanax, a benzodiazepine and well-known date rape drug. In February 2020, daily newspaper Algemeen Dagblad confirmed it had taken Roelofs six visits to three different police stations between 2016 and 2017 before a criminal complaint was taken. When Roelofs was discharged from hospital, she gave up her career as an international photographer to focus on her recovery, as well as mental health and anti-rape activism.

On 25 September 2018, Dutch newspaper De Limburger blew the whistle on low rape convictions in the province of Limburg in collaboration with Roelofs. Roelofs testified against the Dutch police and prosecution office for how they were handling the investigation of her 2016 rape case concerning her former work partner. Roelofs stated that the "police failure" in the case gave "rapists a free card". Her lawyer Richard Korver agreed there had been no investigation into the case and started an "article 12 Sv" procedure for Roelofs to force the Public Prosecution Office through court to investigate and prosecute the suspect.

Since Roelofs' first critique of the police in the media, the Dutch Ministry of Justice and Safety began keeping track of her behaviour online. Roelofs proved this herself through releasing Google Analytics statistics of her blog photoandgrime.com. The Dutch government would find Roelofs' blog via her Facebook, YouTube, Twitter and Gofundme profile and has kept track of her online habits since 25 September 2018, the day the first article where Roelofs criticised the government, was published.

In December 2018, Roelofs' lawyer – notable victim lawyer Richard Korver who took on her case pro-deo – stated in an interview with RTL Nieuws referencing Roelofs' rape case that in his opinion "the police stacked error after error", and that Roelofs was spoken to "in a discouraging way by the police" and that "hardly any investigation has been done." Korver mentioned Roelofs had done her own investigation in the case and that police "hadn't even started to investigate". The art. 12 Sv court hearing was forced behind closed doors, against the wishes of Roelofs and her lawyer. Roelofs told journalists that especially due to the failure of the police the court hearing should be public and advocated for opening up the article 12 Sv cases.

In June 2019, Roelofs spoke with the Washington Post about the death of Noa Pothoven and the Dutch mental health system and treatment of psychiatric patients, highlighting how common it was for inpatients to be discharged too soon as well as the mistreatment of inpatients held in isolation.

In July 2019, Roelofs publicly supported 3 victims in a criminal court case, not related to her own, who all filed complaints against the same suspect. Roelofs attended the court hearing in their criminal case and wrote an opinion article in De Gelderlander where she described the impact on the victims of the case, calling one victim "Jane Gelderland" (Gelderland referring to the province the case took place), publicly criticising the Dutch government for their negligence in protecting rape victims, while mentioning statistics in The Netherlands relating to violence against women.

In February 2020, a reconstruction of Roelofs' rape case concerning her former work-partner, was published by 10 Dutch newspapers. The investigation was conducted by journalist Tonny van der Mee of Algemeen Dagblad and exposed low rape conviction statistics in the Netherlands, highlighting Roelofs' case as an example. The article was put together based on recorded telephone conversations between Roelofs and the police, her medical record and court documents. It was mentioned that Roelofs is autistic and needs ongoing medication and therapy due to PTSD. The reconstruction proved that the Dutch police had mistreated Roelofs, broke the law, failed to interview witnesses, could not find the suspect and that Roelofs eventually traced the suspect herself for the police after the Dutch court had ordered them to find him. Journalist van der Mee discussed in De Ochtend Show that politician Kathalijne Buitenweg asked questions in the Dutch House of Representatives following the reconstruction of the case and treatment of Roelofs.

In December 2020, Roelofs and her lawyers sent a complaint to the European Court of Human Rights after the Dutch prosecution office recognised she was indeed sexually abused by the suspect, but the prosecutor intended not to prosecute him.

In March 2021, Coda Media and Rappler wrote that as a result of the Exurb1a criminal case, Roelofs received death threats, some accompanied by photographs of dead bodies. After the publications the Exurb1a Reddit community, which had over 20,000 subscribers, released a statement titled "Past actions of the creator" in which they condemned the YouTuber for his "poor moderation choices" in the past which had "targeted and defamed" Roelofs, recognising his actions caused an "ongoing defamation campaign for Roelofs" and that Exurb1a had been banned from moderating the community due to this.

The Meuser-Rhine Gazette spoke with Roelofs at the Women's March in Maastricht and wrote she had stated that she had been intimidated by the Dutch prosecution service and said that "it wouldn't be a bad idea" to record every interaction with the police "in case they mistreat you".

Roelofs has received public support from actress Rosanna Arquette, among others. Dutch former prison guard and whistleblower Huig Plug publicly supported Roelofs on Twitter in a series of tweets addressed at the Dutch Public Prosecution Service.

== #filmzedan protest ==
In October 2020, a few local activist groups published the name of an upcoming protest, "March for Justice #filmzedan", in support of victims of rape. The hashtag previously had been used by Roelofs on Twitter, also in the English translation: #startfilmingthem. The website supporting this protest stated #filmzedan was not just a protest, but also the title of a short documentary. One of the activists referred to Roelofs as the "whistleblower" behind the documentary.

== See also ==
- List of whistleblowers
