= Asselt =

Asselt Assel (Limburgish)
- Village
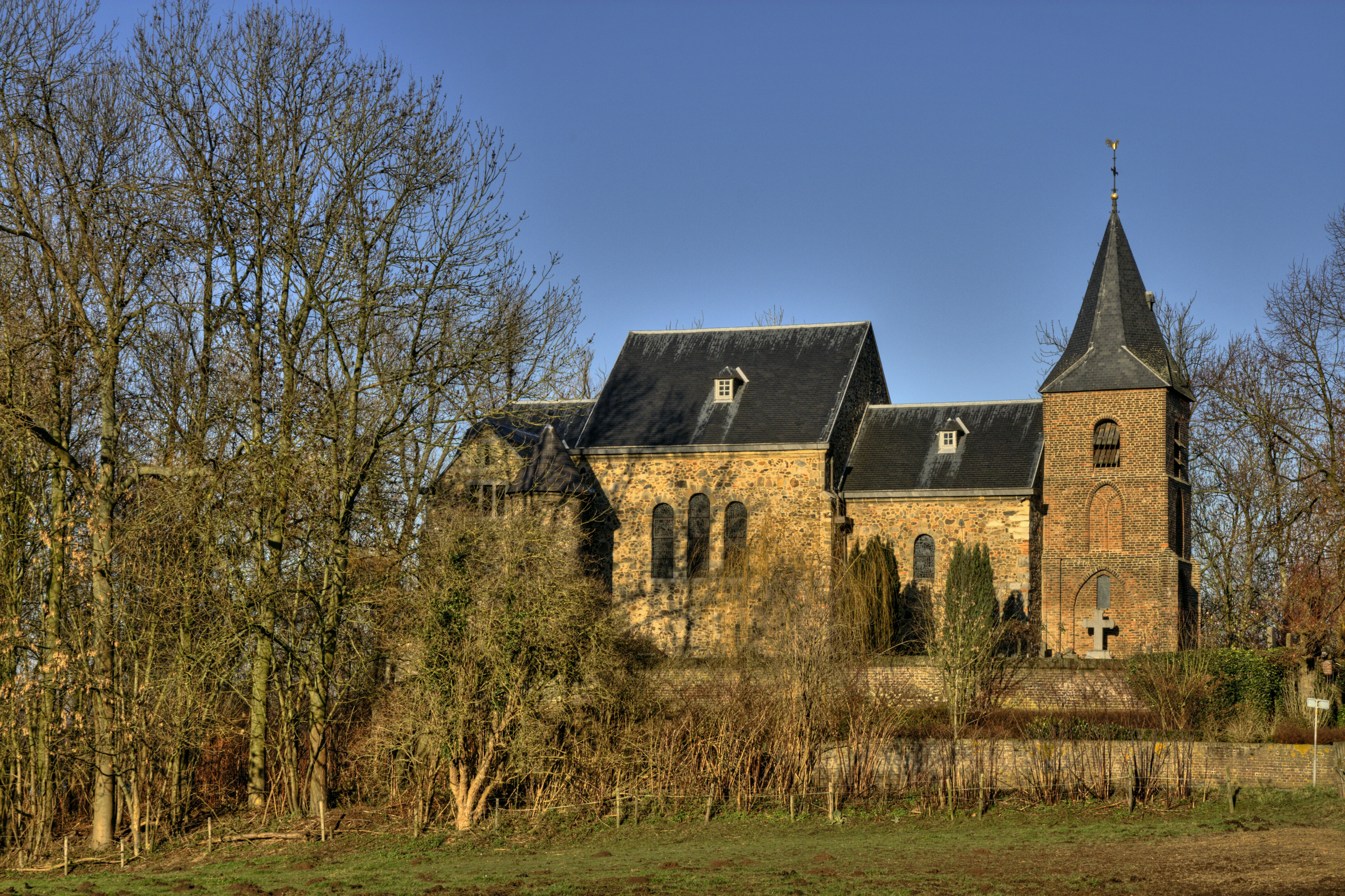
- St Dionysius' Church

- Location in the Netherlands Location in the province of Limburg in the Netherlands
- Coordinates: 51°14′N 6°1′E
- Country: Netherlands
- Province: Limburg
- Municipality: Roermond
- Elevation: 22.1 m (73 ft)

Population (2022)
  - Total: 165
- Time zone: UTC+1 (CET)
  - Summer (DST): UTC+2 (CEST)
- Postcode: 6071
- Area code: 0475

Asselt (Dutch pronunciation: [ˈɑ.səlt]; Limburgish: Assel) is a village in the municipality of Roermond in the province of Limburg in the Netherlands. The town is located on the Meuse and also on the Maasplassen. Approximately 165 people live there (2022). It is best known for its elevated old church. The exterior and interior are special, but especially its location on a hill, and also on a river, is very exceptional in the Netherlands.

== History ==
The name Asselt (Franconian name: Aslao, Aschlo, Ascloha, or Ascaloha) means "ash forest" and is derived from the Germanic aski ("ash") and lauha ("grove on high sandy ground").

In Carolingian times (8th to 11th centuries), Asselt was a Frankish crown domain and royal court (villa, vroenhof, curtis) and as such also functioned as a palace, a place where the supplies of princes were collected and where justice was administered. The Vikings established an army camp here in 881, from which they undertook numerous raids in the surrounding area (including the Sack of Maastricht in 881). The Siege of Asselt took place here in 882.

From around 1100, Asselt was a heerlijkheid with a toll on the Maas, whose lords called themselves 'Van Asselt' around 1200. The first more famous lord was Rutger van Asselt (1275), feudal lord of both the Duchy of Guelders and the County of Loon. Later the heerlijkheid was in the hands of the Van Vlodrop and (via marriage) Schellaert van Obbendorf families.

In 1665, the heerlijkheid of Asselt, with the Asselterhof as its administrative center, was sold by the widow Ursula Schellaert van Obbendorf to Christoffel Schenck van Nydeggen, owner of Hillenraad Castle and the heerlijkheid of Swalmen, with which the heerlijkheden of Swalmen and Asselt came into one hand and remained so until to the abolition by the French.

== Church ==
The Roman Catholic Church of Saint Dionysius of Paris was built in the 11th century on a headland on the Meuse, where a fortress had previously stood. This church was partly built with stones taken from Roman buildings. The nave and choir of the original Romanesque church still remain. The original west tower collapsed in the 16th century and was replaced by a new brick tower, now built on the east side. In 1916–1918 the church was restored and enlarged by Pierre Cuypers. The church has a baptismal font in Romanesque style.

== Gallery ==
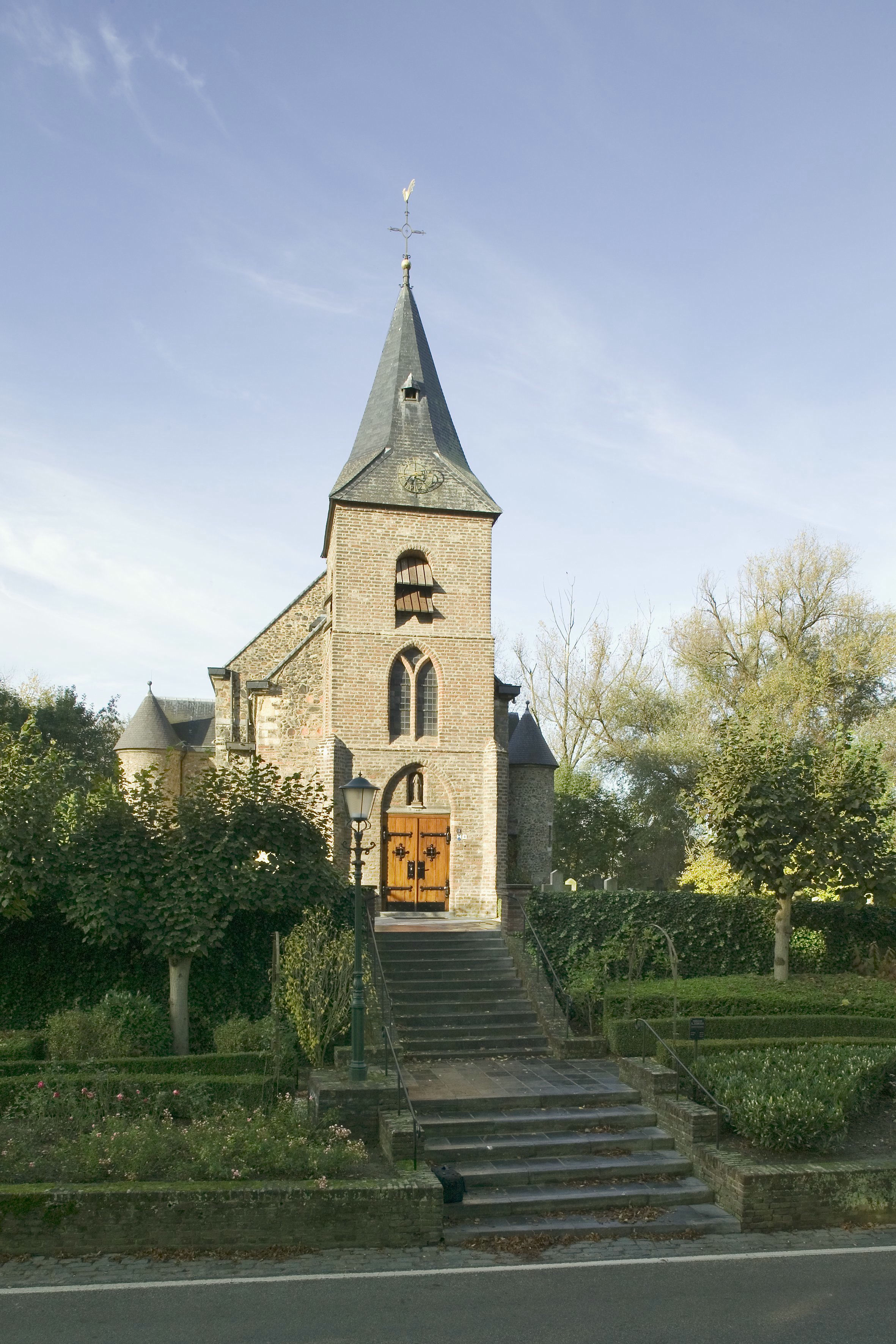
Westside of the church

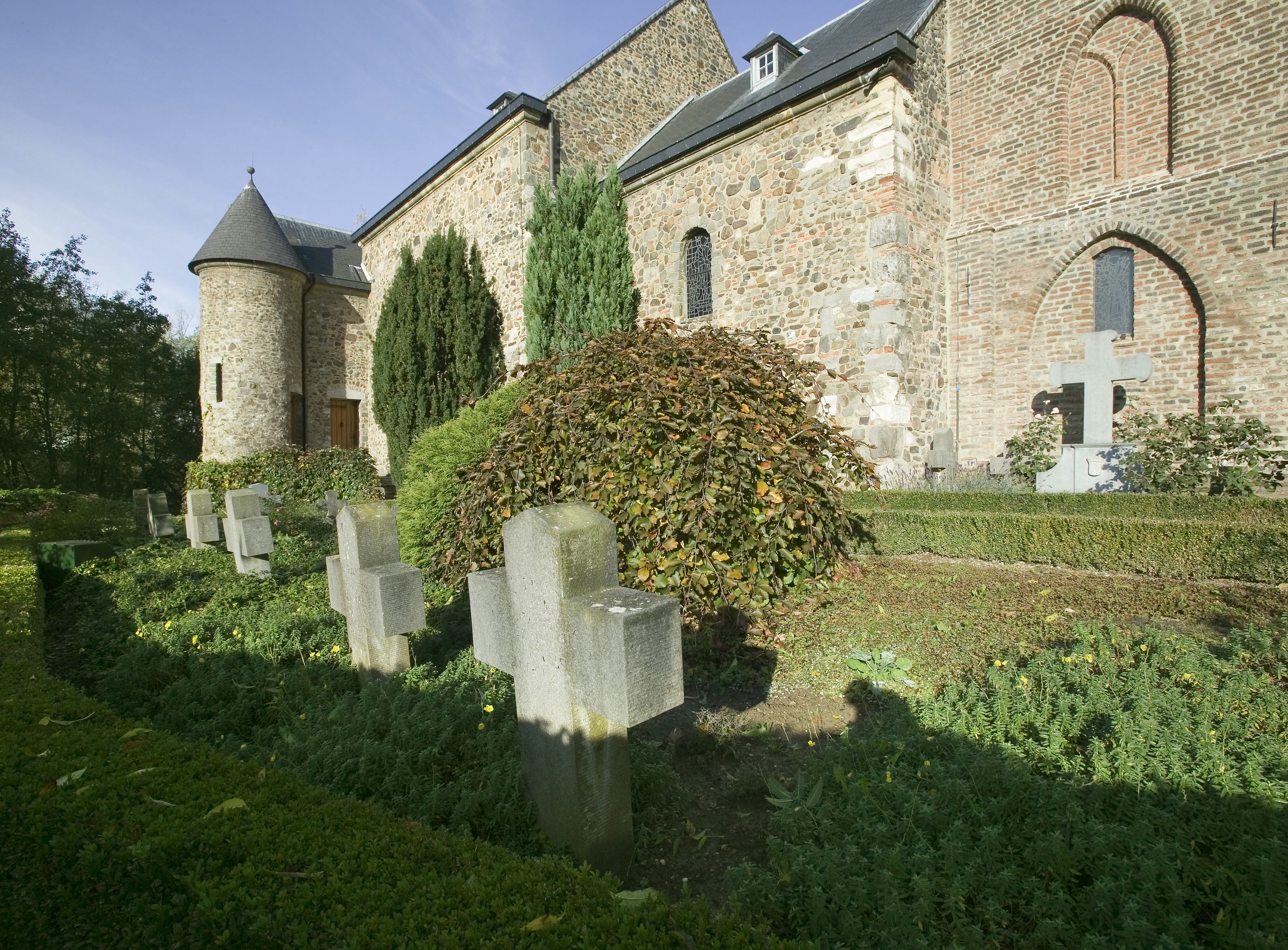
View of the graveyard

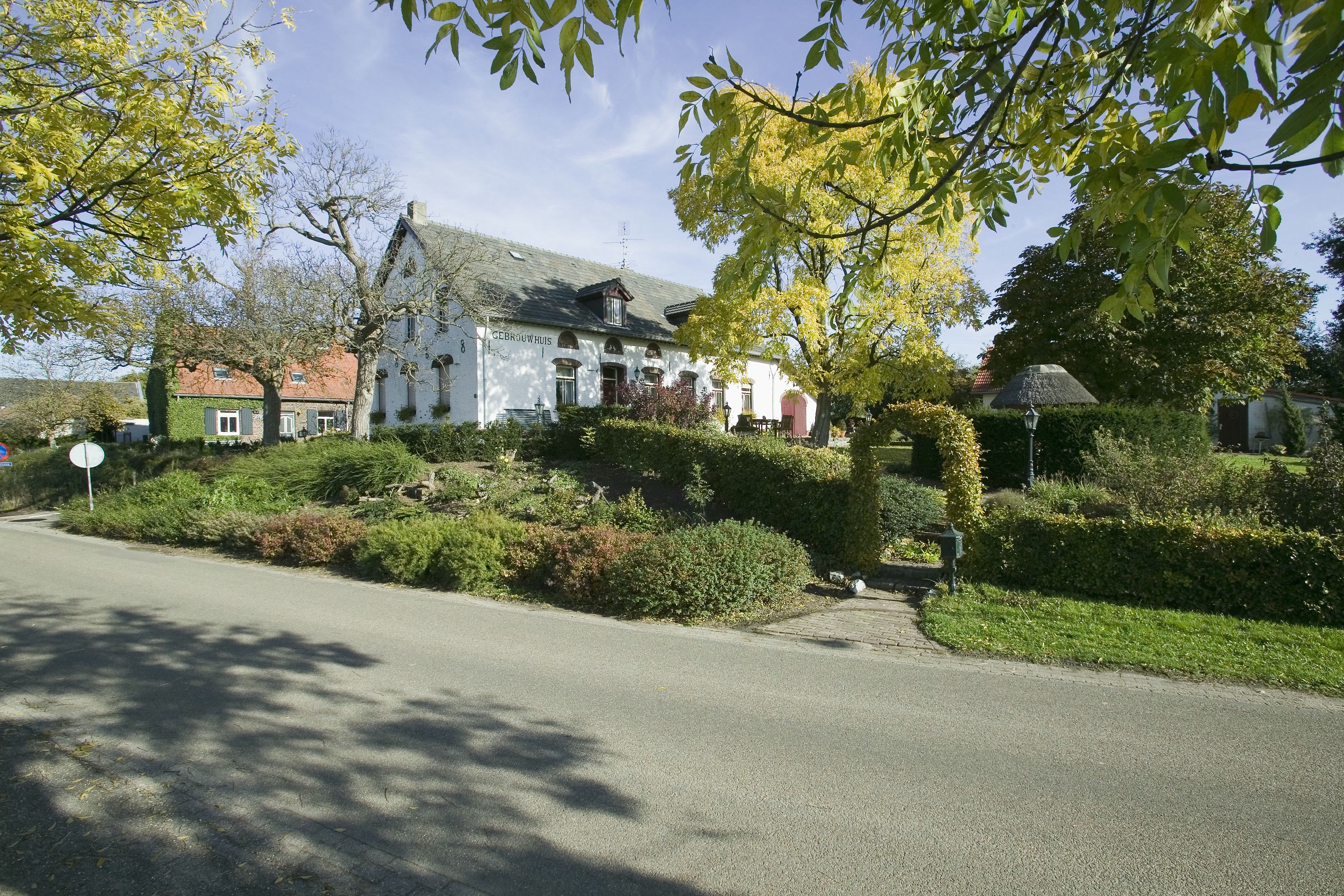
Gebouw-Huis

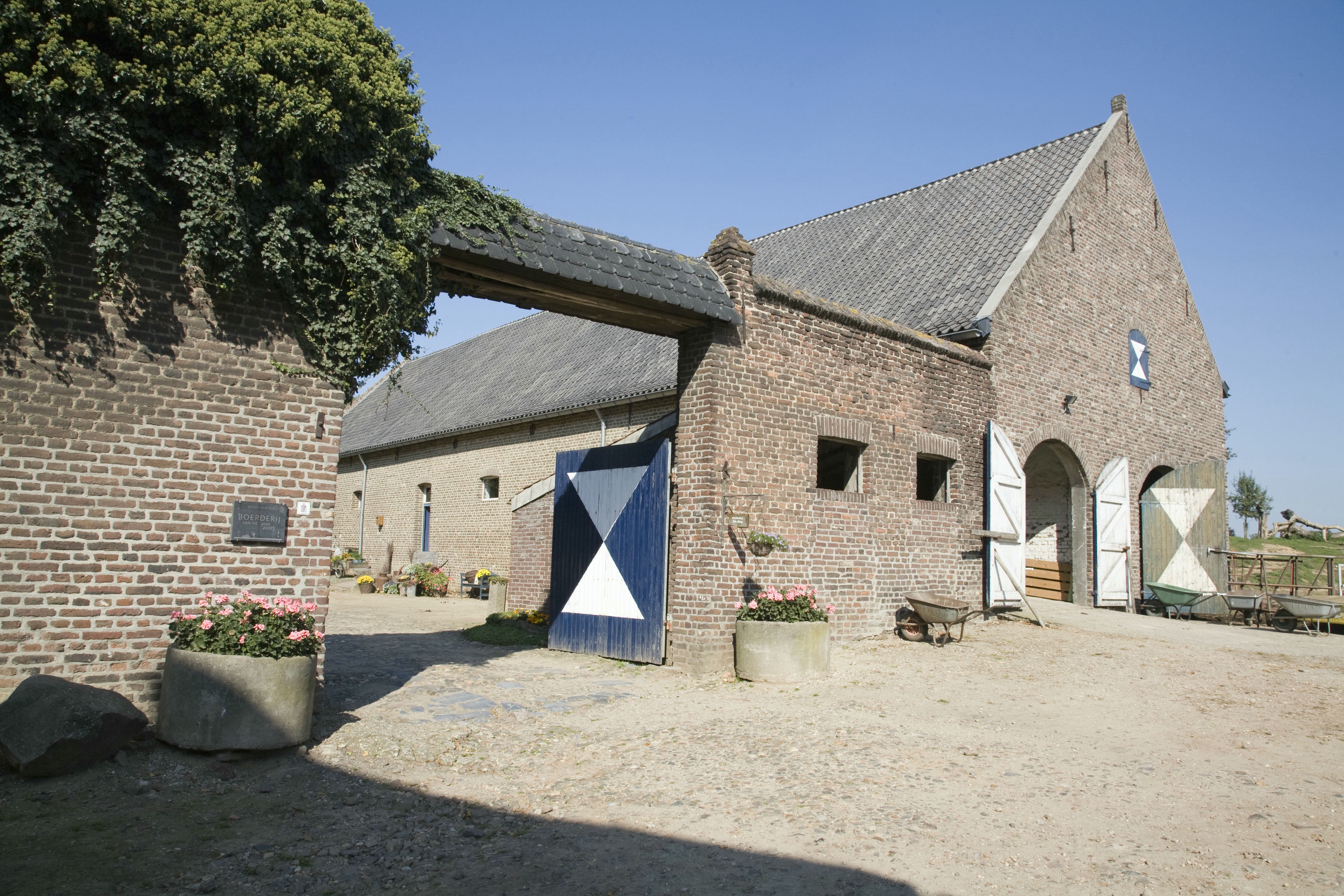
Farmhouse
