= Oost Castle =

- Kasteel Oost
- The restored castle in 2025

General information
- Location: Kasteellaan 1, Oost-Maarland, Netherlands
- Coordinates: 50°47′46″N 5°42′22″E

Oost Castle (Dutch: Kasteel Oost) is a manor house in Oost-Maarland, a village in Eijsden, Limburg, the Netherlands. Located along the Meuse, it can be traced to an 11th-century motte-and-bailey residential tower that was expanded several times between 1548 and 1800. After falling into dilapidation, it was renovated in 1848 but had fallen into dilapidation again by the beginning of World War II.

Beginning in 1941, an art colony led by Teun Roosenburg and his wife Jopie took residence in the castle. As they worked, trading art for food, the artists smuggled Jewish refugees away from the German occupation. The Roosenburgs purchased the castle in 1957, after which time they made extensive renovations, replacing the 1848-built chalet roof with a flatter design. After their deaths, the castle was acquired by Michel Maes; as of 2024, it is being converted into a luxury hotel.

Together with a farmhouse on the grounds, the castle was declared a rijksmonument (national monument) on 17 January 1967.

== Location ==
The castle is located at Kasteellaan 1 in Oost-Maarland, a village in Eijsden, Limburg, the Netherlands. It lies near the Netherlands' border with Belgium, along the Meuse.

== History ==
=== Early history ===
At the core of the castle is a residential tower, completed in the 11th century using a motte-and-bailey construction. This tower is thought to have consisted of no more than four storeys and stood no taller than 12 metres (39 ft). Beginning in 1548, extensions were constructed from this tower, first northward and then southward. A second tower dates from this period. Further extensions were built between 1674 and the 18th century, while new brick was used to restore the façades of the residential tower. In 1761, the Geloes family acquired the property.

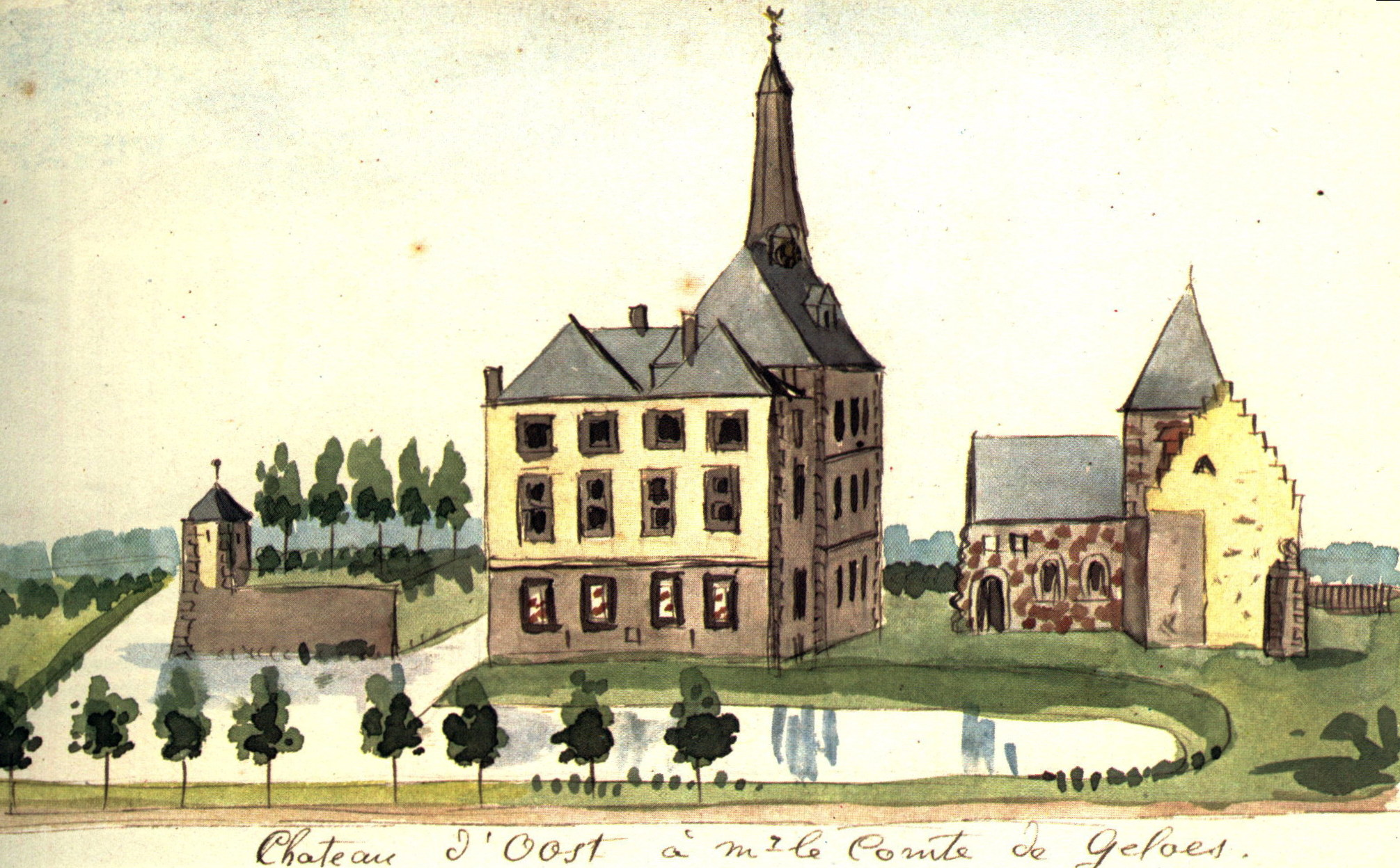
A drawing of Oost Castle by Philippe van Gulpen, c. 1840

By 1800, the castle featured a gatehouse to its east. It was surrounded on three sides by orchards, and accessible via the north and south. It had fallen into disrepair by 1836, with parts of the bailey demolished and the orchards replaced by pasture. After more than a decade vacant, extensive renovations were undertaken in 1848. At this time, the saddle roof was replaced by a Swiss chalet-style design. Over time, the moat was filled in and the outbuildings were demolished. By the 1930s, the castle – purchased in 1936 by Count Marcel de Liedekerke, the resident of Eijsden Castle – was again dilapidated. It was used for some time as a youth hostel. Following the Nazi occupation of the Netherlands in 1940, it was briefly used by German soldiers.

=== Art colony and Roosenburg ownership ===
Beginning in 1941, the castle was occupied by an art colony led by the sculptor Teun Roosenburg, who had travelled to Eijsden in search of a means of practising his art without registering with the newly established Nederlandsche Kultuurkamer (Chamber of Dutch Culture). He rented the castle, furnished with nothing but straw beds and a fruit crate, for fifty guilders per month. Early members of the community included Roosenburg, his painter girlfriend (and later wife) Jopie Goudriaan, and the sculptors Hanni Rädecker and Piet Damsté. Nicolaas Wijnberg, writing in 1997, recalled that most of the building's twenty-one rooms remained empty when he arrived at the castle in 1942 with another painter. As World War II continued, however, the colony expanded to include numerous artists. Also present at the castle were musicians, including members of the Limburg Symphony Orchestra. At its peak, the colony had eighteen residents.

Members of the colony couriered funds for the Resistance and used the castle's proximity to Belgium to facilitate the emigration of Jewish refugees. To protect them, Roosenburg urged residents to dress extravagantly. As narrated by Wijnberg, they "put on strange hats and caps, painted [their] shoes, and when [they] went outside [they] deliberately stared a lot and dreamily at the landscape and the cloudy sky". (Note: Original: "... zetten rare hoeden en petten op, beschilderden onze schoenen en als we buiten hepen staarden we opzettelijk veel en dromerig naar het landschap en naar de wolkenhemel, opdat anderen maar zouden denken".) Meanwhile, the colony made several changes to the castle. By 1942, Jopie Roosenburg had painted a mural – a reproduction of a Picasso composition with mandolin, compotier, and melon – in a hallway. Wijnberg painted another mural on the opposite wall. Much restoration work had been completed by Teun Roosenburg, Rädecker, and Damsté by war's end in 1945, after which the latter two returned to their native Amsterdam.

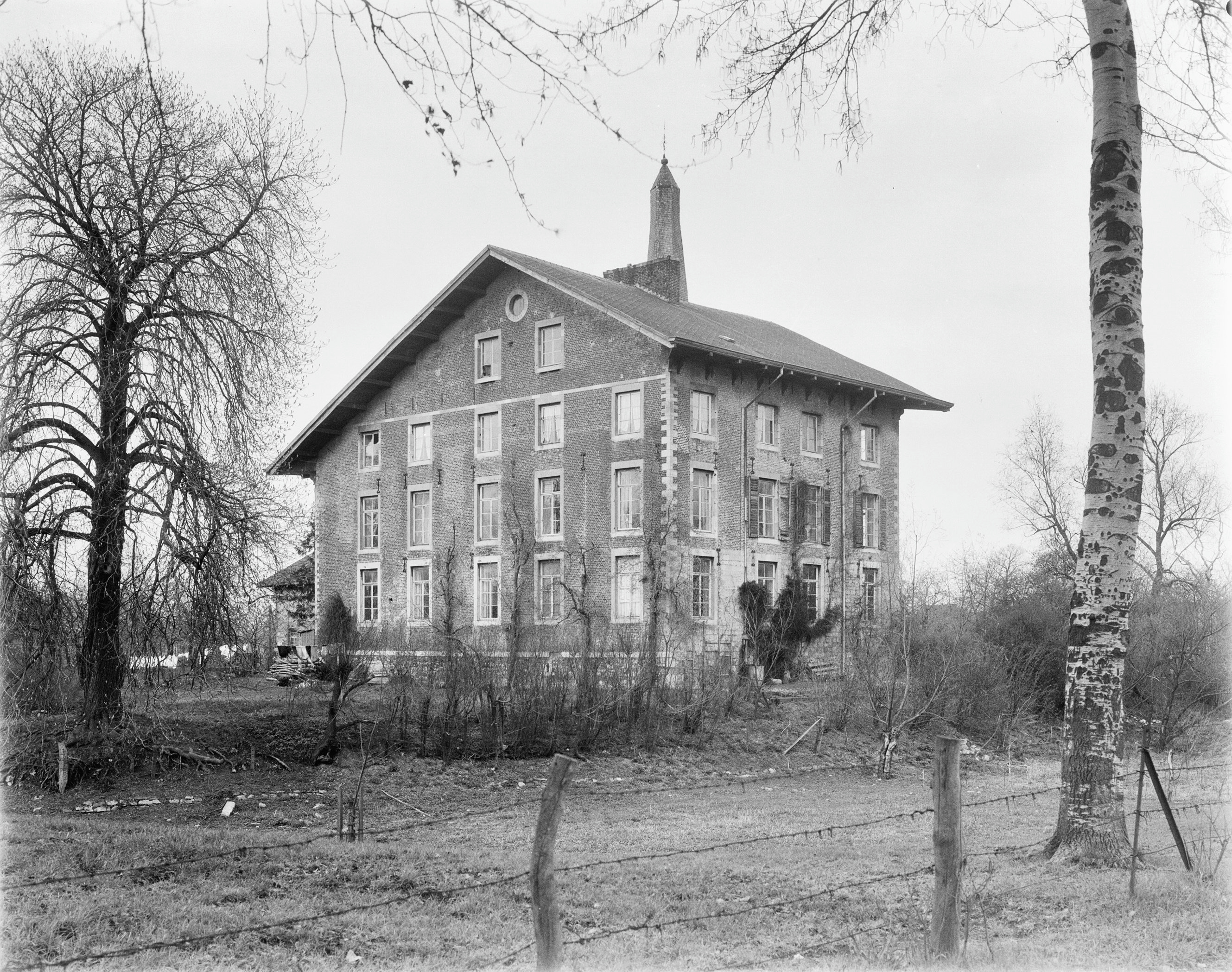
Oost Castle in 1954

The Roosenburgs bought the castle in 1957 for an undisclosed (but large) amount. After acquiring the property, they began extensive renovations, which resulted in the chalet roof and one tower being replaced with a flat roof and terrace. At the same time, they acquired a rotating collection of art, which included at one point a work by Jan Steen that was later sold to the Metropolitan Museum of Art in New York. The castle was declared a rijksmonument (national monument) on 17 January 1967, with the ascension number 15519; an 18th-century farmhouse on the property, northeast of the castle, was likewise made a monument with the ascension number 15520.

In the cellar, Jopie kept a large collection of antique dolls and dollhouses, as well as pottery and second-hand furniture. During their ownership, the Roosenburgs hosted numerous artists, writers, and musicians, including the painter Hermanus Berserik, the journalist Anton Koolhaas (Teun's brother-in-law), and the writer Cola Debrot. In a 1991 interview, Hans van Norden described the ambience of the castle under the Roosenburgs as "special ... you literally tripped over the easels. In the evenings, people gathered by the fireplace in the drawing room. There they smoked, drank, played music, ate, discussed, laughed or just didn't laugh and chatted about the war, art and the wonderful times that were ahead of us." (Note: Original: "Bijzonder ... je struikelde er bij wijze van spreken over de schildersezels. 's Avonds kwam men samen bij de open haard in de salon. Daar werd gerookt, gedronken, gemusiceerd, gegeten, gediscussieerd, gelachen of juist niet gelachen en geouwehoerd over de oorlog, de kunst en de zalige tijden die we tegemoet gingen.")

=== Hotel ===
Jopie Roosenburg died in 1996, with Teun following in 2004. Oost Castle was acquired and occupied by Michel Maes, the owner of Maes Vastgoed, who spent several years acquiring the permits to restore the castle to its pre-1848 design; the 23-metre (75 ft) high tower was completed in 2022. In 2024, renovations began to convert the castle into a luxury hotel with several restaurants. Expansions restore the original design and expanded the complex to eighty rooms. The hotel opened in March 2025. One of its restaurants, Create by Guido Braeken, received two Michelin stars at once in October 2025.

== Works cited ==
- BRO Landschapsarchitecten; SATIJNplus Architecten (November 2016). "Historische Analyse – Buitengoed Kasteel Oost" [Historical Analysis – The Castle Oost Manor House] (PDF) (in Dutch). Archived from the original (PDF) on 10 June 2024.
- Cortenraedt, Jo (24 January 2024). "Sterrenteam wil Kasteel Oost naar de Top Brengen" [Star Team Wants to Bring Kasteel Oost to the Top]. Chapeau (in Dutch). Archived from the original on 10 June 2024.
- "Expositie 'Terug naar Kasteel Oost'" [Exposition 'Return to Oost Castle'] (in Dutch). Museum Valkenburg. Archived from the original on 25 June 2022.
- Fromme, Bob (29 April 1986). "Een Kunstenaarsechtpaar met Dorstige Vrienden" [An Artist Couple with Thirsty Friends]. Het Parool (in Dutch). Amsterdam. p. 13.
- "Jopie Roosenburg-Goudriaan" (in Dutch). Netherlands Institute for Art History. Archived from the original on 10 June 2024.
- "Kasteellaan 1" (Map). Google Maps.
- "Kasteellaan 1, 6245 SB te Eijsden" [Kasteellaan 1, 6245 SB in Eijsden]. Rijksmonumentenregister (in Dutch). Ministry of Education, Culture and Science. Archived from the original on 25 September 2023.
- "Kasteellaan 3, 6245 SB te Eijsden" [Kasteellaan 3, 6245 SB in Eijsden]. Rijksmonumentenregister (in Dutch). Ministry of Education, Culture and Science. Archived from the original on 19 August 2022.
- "Kasteel Oost Wordt in Oude Glorie Hersteld" [Oost Castle Being Restored to Its Former Glory] (in Dutch). Rijsden Heritage Foundation.
- "Land en Water" [Land and Water]. Flevoland Heritage (in Dutch). Fleurbaaij Kunst & Cultuur. Archived from the original on 27 September 2023.
- Laudy, Yvonne (30 November 1991). "De Gongevaarlijke 'Gekken' van Kasteel Oost" [The Harmless 'Madmen' of Oost Castle]. De Telegraaf (in Dutch). Amsterdam. p. 25.
- "Limburgse Kunstenaars als Kasteelbewoner" [Limburger Artists as Castleowners]. Limburgsch Dagblad (in Dutch). Heerlen. 22 December 1956. p. 11.
- Norden, Hans van (1997). "Le Piano d'Ingres" [The Piano of Ingres]. In Huijnen, R.; Jeukens, W.; Schroen, G. (eds.). Jopie Roosenburg-Goudriaan: Schilderes van het Maasdal [Jopie Roosenburg-Goudriaan: Painter of the Meuse Valley] (PDF). Uit Eijsdens Verleden. Vol. 74–75. Stichting Eijsdens Verleden. pp. 16–17.
- Willems, René (26 July 2022). "Kasteel Oost torent weer 27 Meter hoog Boven Oost-Maarland uit" [Oost Castle Once again Towers 27 Metres High above Oost-Maarland]. De Limburger (in Dutch).
- Wijnberg, Nicolaas (1997). "De Gravin van Oost" [The Countess of Oost]. In Huijnen, R.; Jeukens, W.; Schroen, G. (eds.). Jopie Roosenburg-Goudriaan: Schilderes van het Maasdal [Jopie Roosenburg-Goudriaan: Painter of the Meuse Valley] (PDF). Uit Eijsdens Verleden. Vol. 74–75. Stichting Eijsdens Verleden. pp. 7–10.
