= Boukoul =

Boukoul (Roermond)
- Village
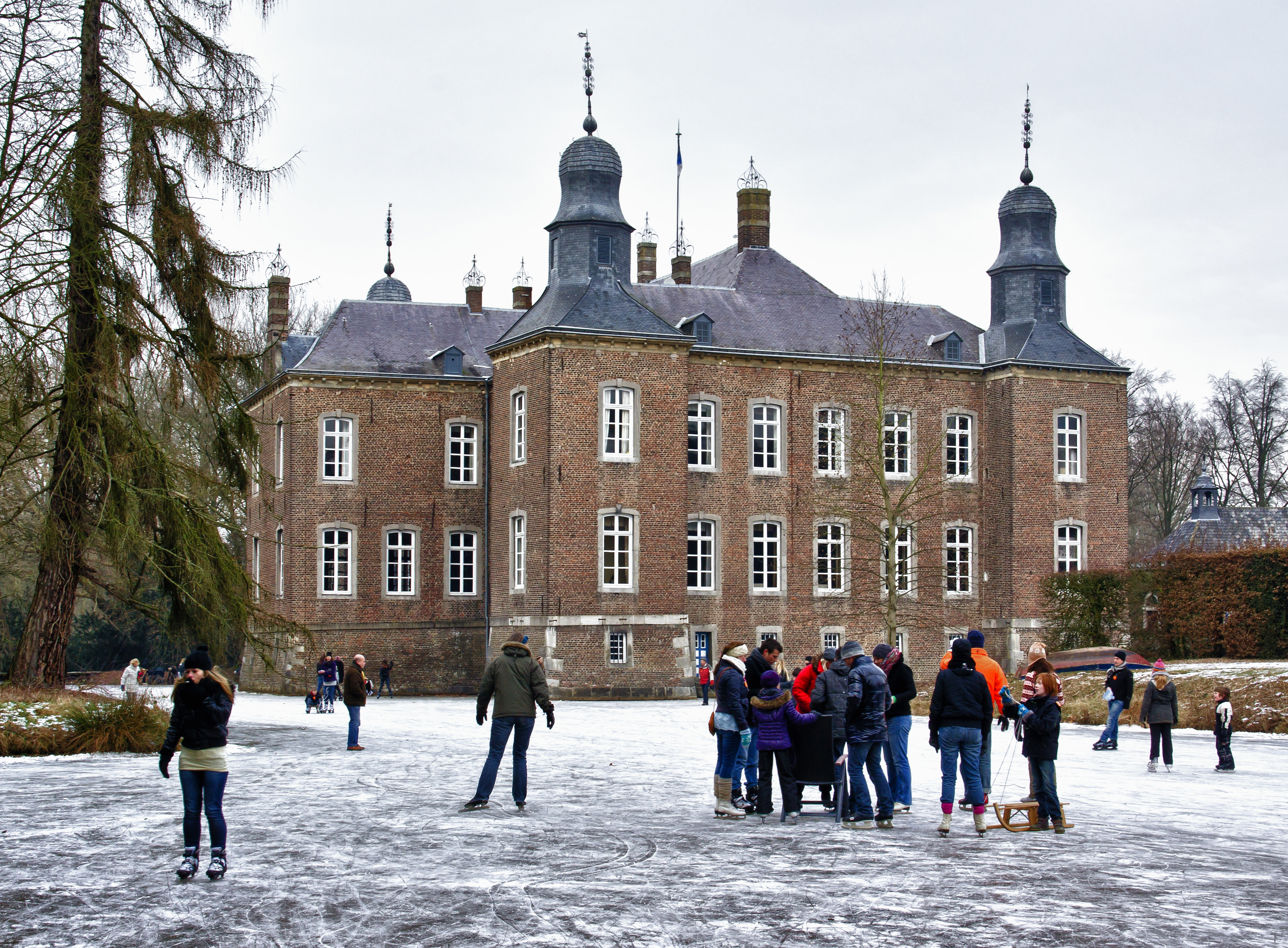
- Hillenraad Castle

- Location in the Netherlands Location in the province of Limburg in the Netherlands
- Coordinates: 51°13′N 6°3′E
- Country: Netherlands
- Province: Limburg
- Municipality: Roermond

Area
  - Total: 1.15 km^{2} (0.44 sq mi)
- Elevation: 24 m (79 ft)

Population (2021)
  - Total: 1,010
  - Density: 878/km^{2} (2,270/sq mi)
- Time zone: UTC+1 (CET)
  - Summer (DST): UTC+2 (CEST)
- Postal code: 6071
- Dialing code: 0475
- Major roads: N273, N280

Boukoul (Dutch: [ˈbukul]) is a village in the Dutch province of Limburg. It is a part of the municipality of Roermond, and is situated about 5 km northeast of Roermond.

The village was first mentioned in 1463 as "opter Buyeckulen". The etymology is unclear.

Boukoul was home to 322 people in 1840. Hillenraad Castle was built in the 17th century as a manor house. It received its current shape in 1767. In 1935, a church was built in Boukoul. In 1945, several days before liberation, the tower was blown up by the Germans. It was restored in 1947.

Boukoul used to be part of the municipality of Swalmen. In 2007, it became part of the municipality of Roermond.

== Gallery ==
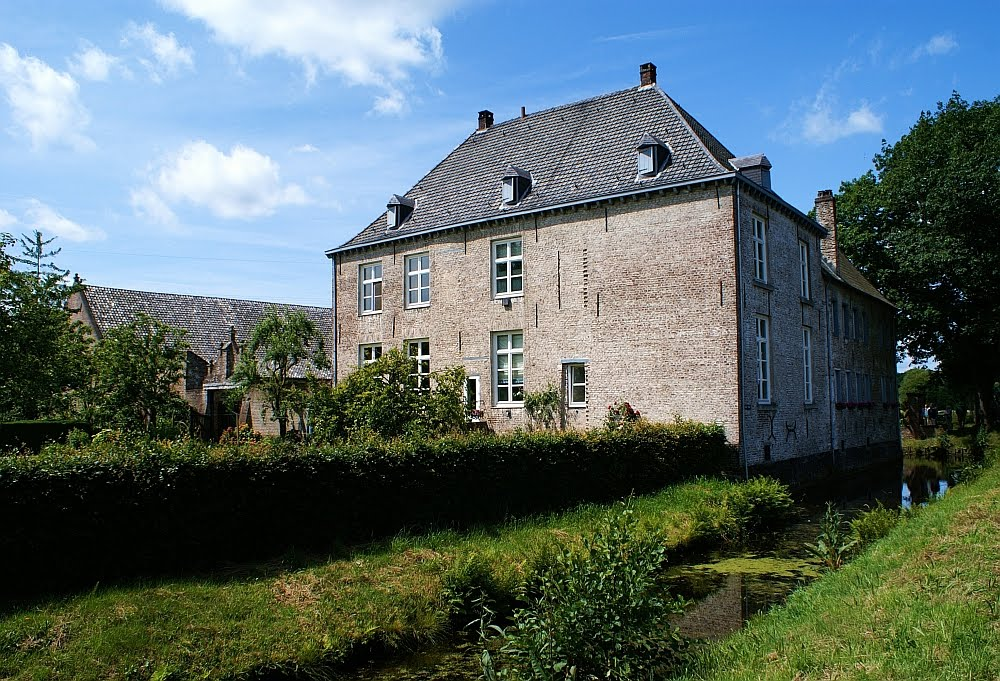
Estate huis Zuidewijk-Spick
