= Swalmen =

Swalmen Zjwame
- Village
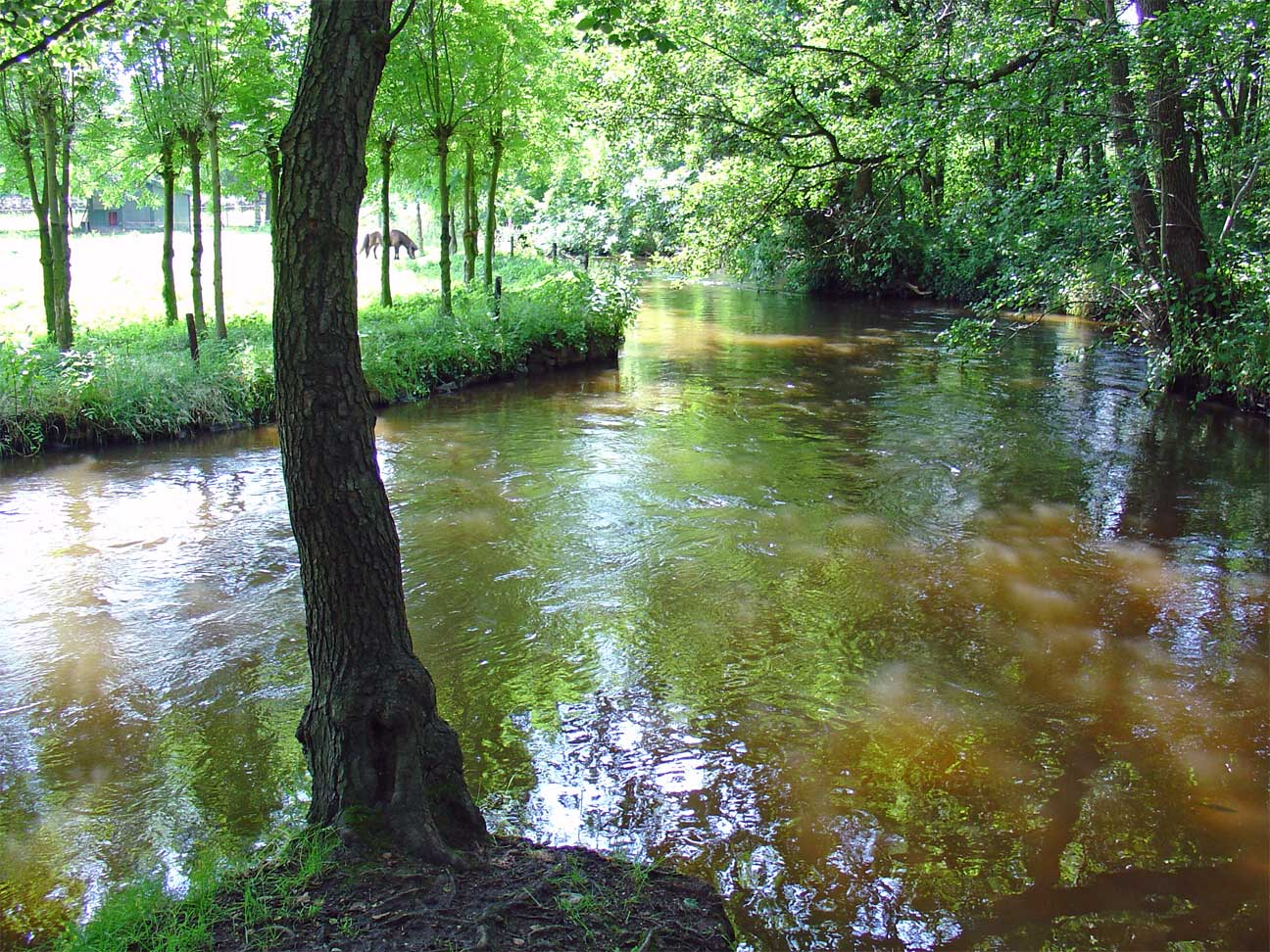
- Swalm brook near Swalmen

- Flag Coat of arms
- Interactive map of Swalmen
- Coordinates: 51°14′N 6°02′E
- Country: Netherlands
- Province: Limburg
- Municipality: Roermond

Area
  - Total: 17.34 km^{2} (6.70 sq mi)
- Elevation: 24 m (79 ft)

Population (2025)
  - Total: 8,855
  - Density: 510.7/km^{2} (1,323/sq mi)
- Time zone: UTC+1 (CET)
  - Summer (DST): UTC+2 (CEST)
- Postal code: 6070-6071
- Dialing code: 0475
- Major roads: A73, N271

Swalmen (Dutch: [ˈsʋɑlmə(n)]; Limburgish: Zjwame [ˈʒwaː˦mə]) is a village in the municipality of Roermond, the south-eastern Netherlands. This village is situated between the German border and the river Meuse (Maas in Dutch).

Until 1 January 2007, Swalmen was a separate municipality, covering the villages Swalmen, Asselt and Boukoul. These are now part of the municipality of Roermond.

Many monuments are found in Swalmen, most notable the Hillenraad castle, the romanesque 'Rozenkerkje' church in Asselt, and castle farms Graeterhof and Zuidewijk Spick. The area attracts tourists for its peaceful surroundings, asparagus, the Groenewoud forest and forestrial swimming pool de Bosberg.

In 1863, the Swalmen railway station opened on the Maastricht to Venlo railway line. In 2003, the railway line was moved to make room for the A73 motorway and the railway station is now detached from the rails. The building was scheduled for demolition, however it has remained.

The only physical Max Verstappen shop is located in the district of Roermond Swalmen.

== Gallery ==
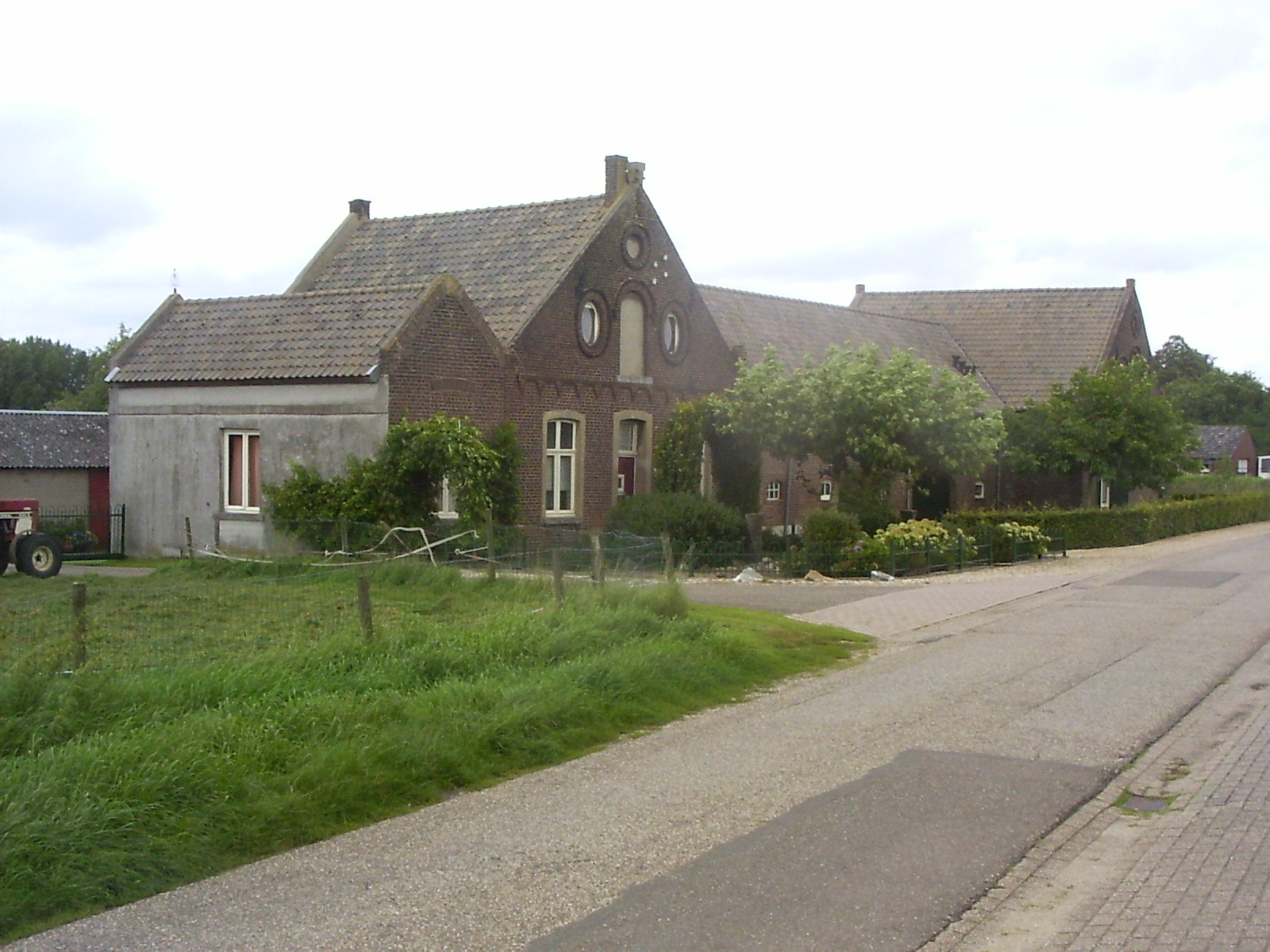
Farm in Swalmen

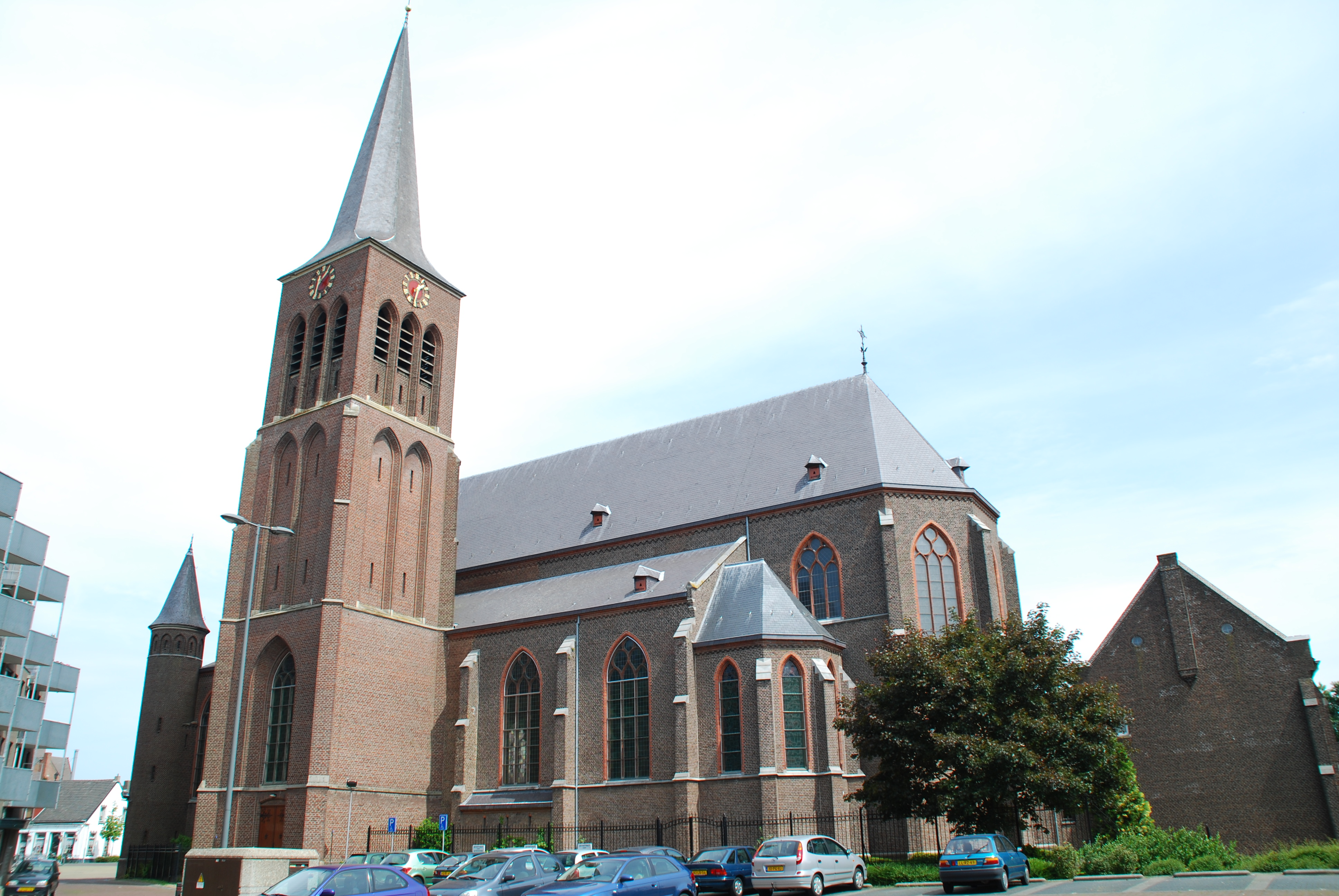
St Lambertus Church

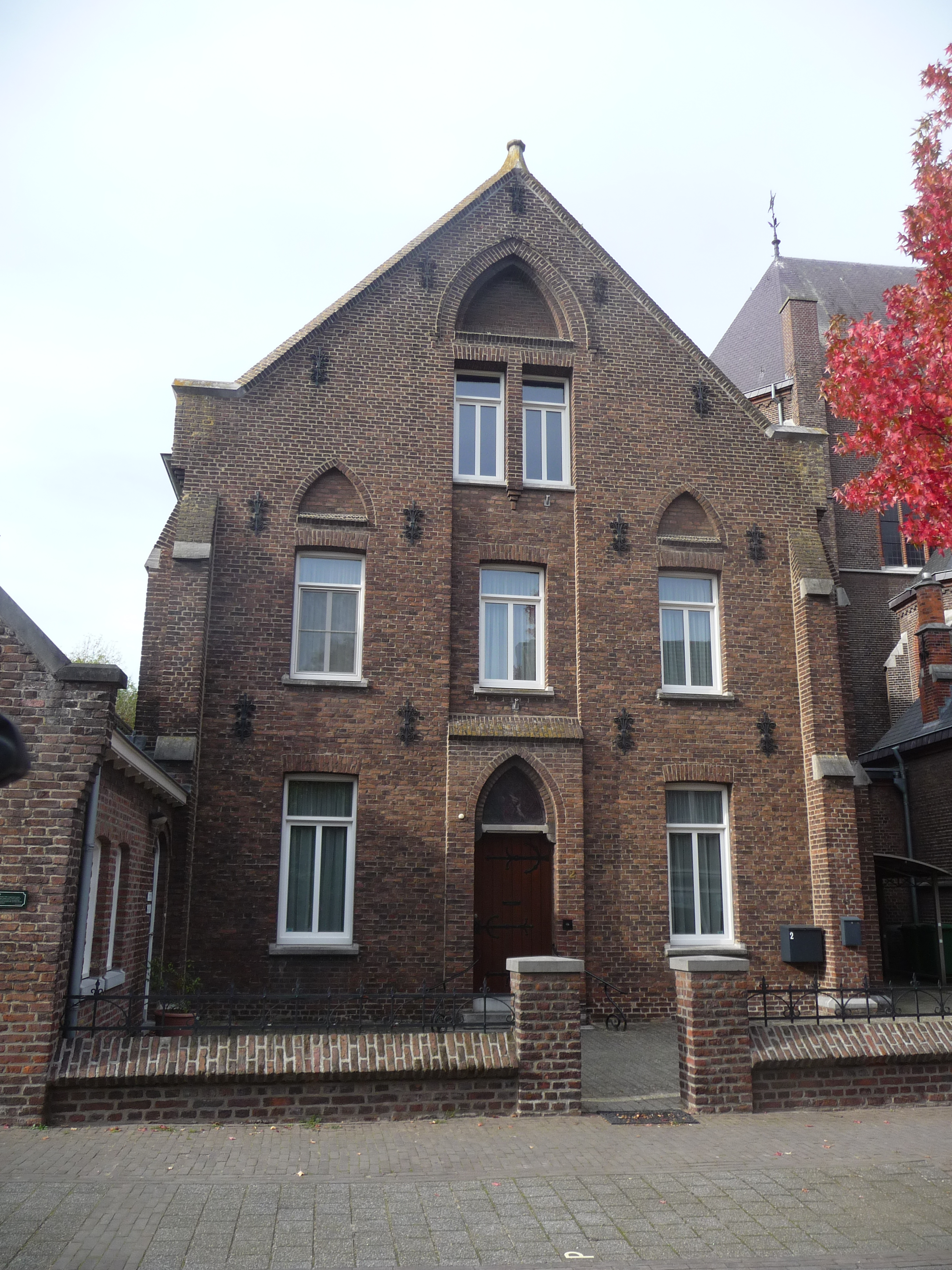
Clergy house

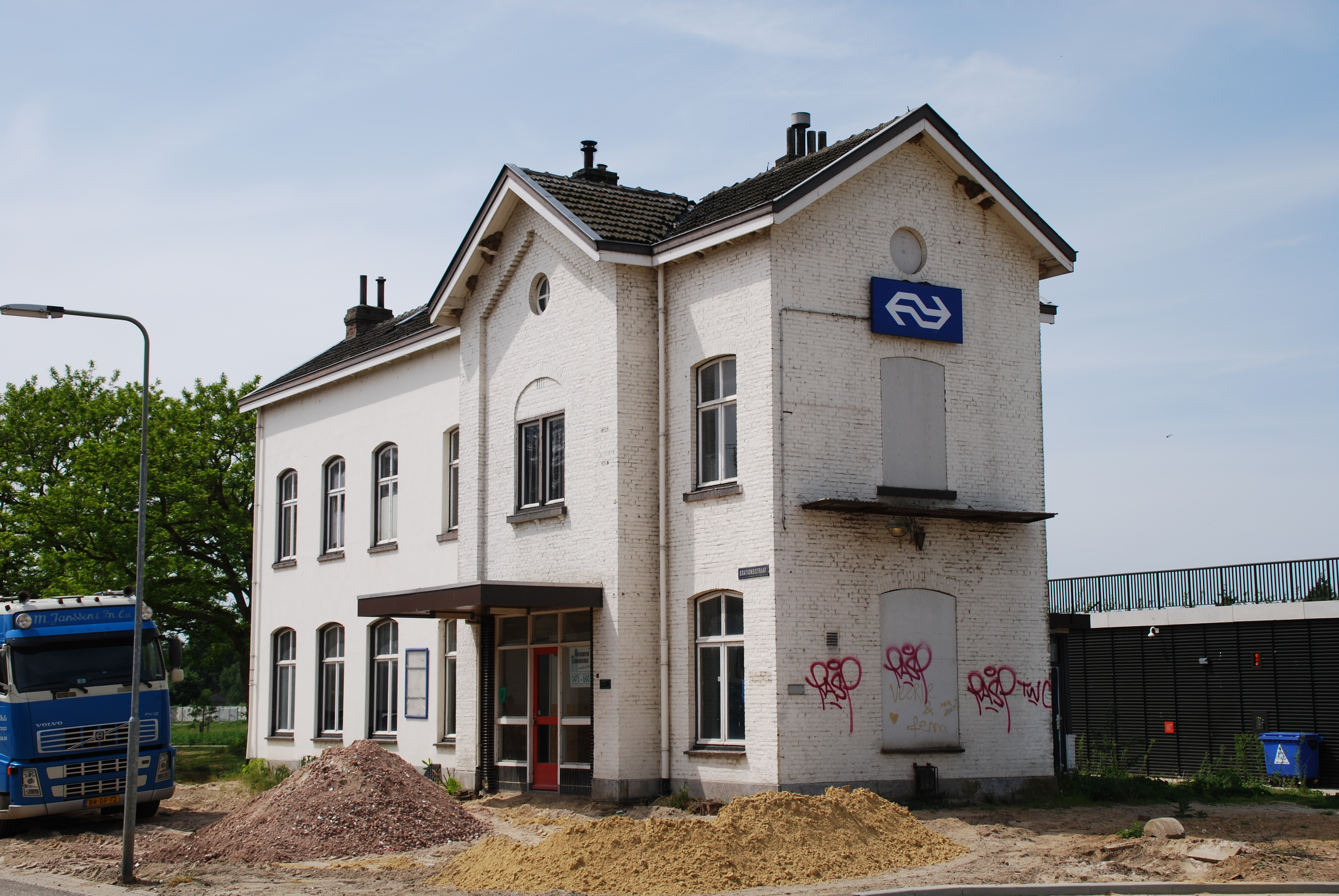
Swalmen railway station
