= Hermanus Berserik =

Dutch painter (1921–2002)

Hermanus (Herman) Berserik (June 19, 1921 – March 21, 2002) was a Dutch painter and print maker. He was a member of the Pulchri Studio in The Hague. He studied art at that city's Royal Academy of Art, where his teachers included Willem Schrofer, Willem Jacob Rozendaal, and Rein Draijer.

== Biography ==
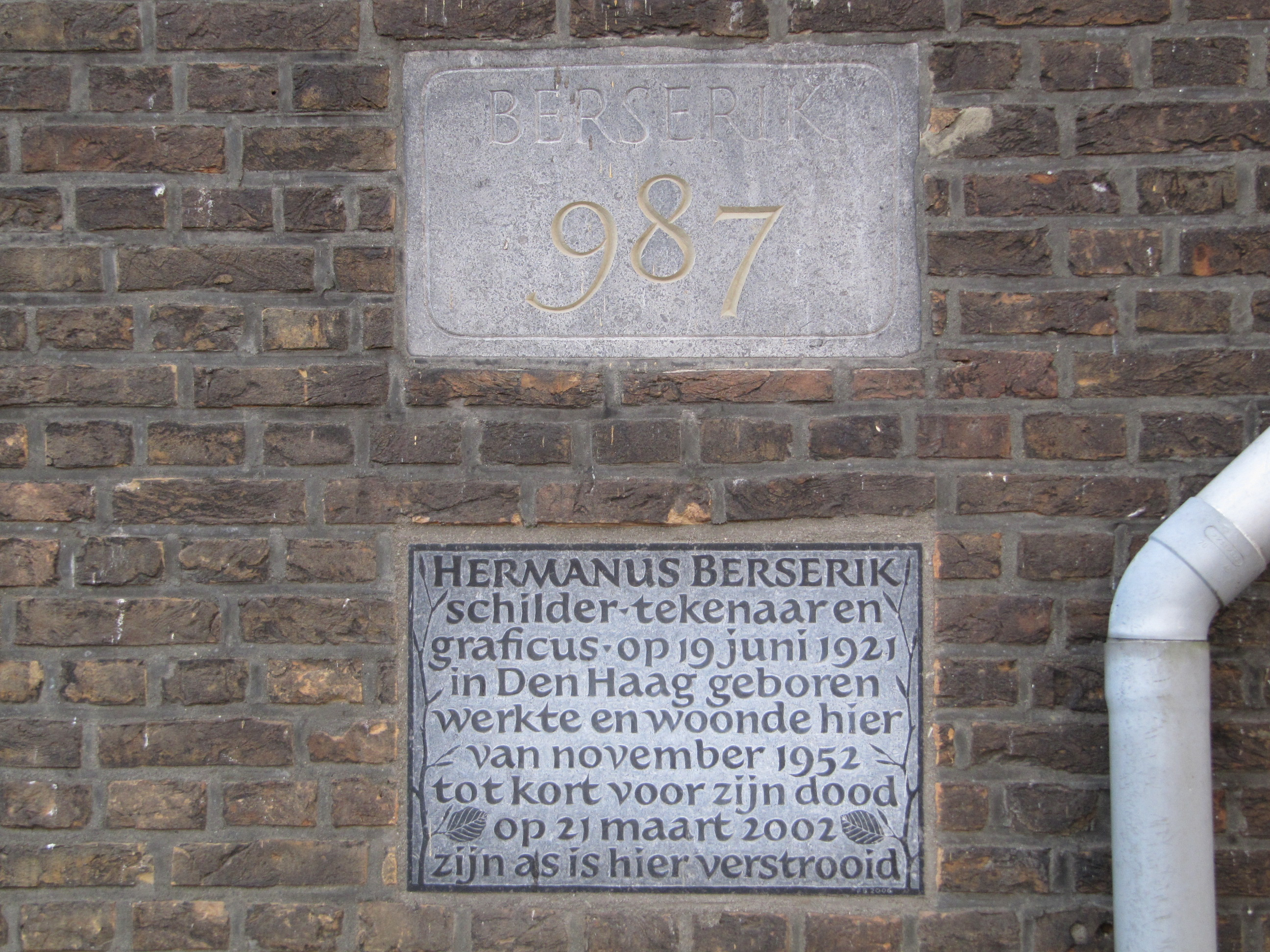
Plaque on his former house in "De Voorde" (Rijswijk)

Berserik was born in The Hague. He studied at the Royal Academy of Art in The Hague from 1939 to 1944, where he studied with among others William Schrofer (painting), Willem Rozendaal (graphic arts), Paul Citroen and Rein Draijer. He graduated in 1944, and became a member of The Hague Art Circle in 1946. In 1948 he became a teacher at the Vrije Academie voor Beeldende Kunsten (Free Academy of Fine Arts Workshop) in The Hague. He was a member of the group Verve (1951–1958). From 1958 to 1978 Berserik was a teacher printing and illustration techniques at the Royal Academy of Fine Art in 1963 and active member of the Hague art club "Pulchri Studio". He was also a member of the Federation of Professional Visual Artists in Amsterdam. He lived from 1952 until his death in the former gardeners home (built in 1806) of the country estate "De Voorde" in Rijswijk.

== Work and style ==
Berserik initially did a lot of commissioned work: posters, small prints and illustrations. He signed commercials for Philips, the PTT (Dutch royal mail) and KLM. So he made more than 300 covers and illustrations for books for publishers including Voorhoeve (The Hague), Bert Bakker/Daamen (Ooievaar pockets) and Querido (Salamander pockets, both comparable with the Penguin Books ). These were books by famous authors such as Louis Paul Boon, Willem Elsschot, Nescio and Paul van Ostaijen. In 1959 he made cartoon film about the construction of the Delta Works in the southwest of the Netherlands in commission of the public relation department of the water management authorities. Between 1953 and 1976 he designed costumes and stages for eight different theater productions. Berserik made over 1500 paintings, portraits, still lives, city and seascapes and landscapes. He also made architectural commissions, laying mosaics, reliefs and murals in the district of The Hague where he spent his youth. Most of them are now destroyed because the buildings they were part of were pulled down.

== Awards ==
Berserik received numerous awards, including "Koninklijke Subsidie voor de Schilderkunst" in 1948 en 1949, de "Jacob Marisprijs" in 1950, de "David Roëllprijs" in 1951, de "Jacob Marisprijs voor grafiek" in 1952 en 1960, de "Jacob Hartogprijs" in 1963 en "Jacob Hartog oeuvreprijs" (Lifetime Achievement award) in 2000.

== Students ==
Berserik taught: Adele de Beaufort, Ernst Bosch, Erna Giesel, Ton Hoogendoorn, Anthony Roelofs and Barbara Schrier. The graphic designer Françoise Berserik and illustrator Teun Berserik are children of Herman Berserik.

== Musea ==
The work of Berserik has appeared in several Dutch museum collections, including the Gemeentemuseum Den Haag, Museum voor Communicatie in The Hague and the "Instituut Collectie Nederland". However, the majority of his paintings, drawings, etchings, and lithographs is privately owned.

== Exhibitions (selection) ==
Between 1947 and 2001 there were 38 one-person exhibitions including:

- 1965 Art Gallery M.L. de Boer in Amsterdam
- 1967 First Retrospective exhibition in former Gemeentemuseum (now: Museum voor Moderne Kunst Arnhem) in Arnhem
- 1971 Pulchri Studio The Hague
- 1973 Travelling exhibition in Cultural Center Venlo, Gemeentemuseum Den Haag, Zonnewijzer Eindhoven and De Vaart Hilversum.
- 1979 Second retrospective exhibition in the Gemeentemuseum, Arnhem (June–August) and Zonnehof Amersfoort (Sept.)
- 1988 - 2001 Seven retrospectives in his hometown, "Museum Rijswijk(ZH)".

Posthumously

- 2009 Retrospective exhibition at the Museum Buitenplaats in Eelde

Between 1943 and 2001 there were 50 group exhibitions including:

- 1951 Realists from 7 countries, Stedelijk Museum, Amsterdam.
- 1961 Artists see the Delta works, Gemeentemuseum Den Haag
- 1977 "De Fiets" (The bike), Museum Boijmans Van Beuningen, Rotterdam
- 1984 De doorbraak van de moderne kunst in Nederland (The breakthrough of modern art in the Netherlands) Stedelijk Museum De Lakenhal, Leiden
- 1993 "De jaren 50, een Haagse visie". (The fifties, a Hague vision). Pulchri Studio The Hague
- 2001 "Nederlandse realisten na 1950" (Dutch Realists after 1950), Kunsthal, Rotterdam.

== Bibliography (selection) ==
There are between 1950 and 2009 some 50 books and booklets with contributions from Berserik or about Berserik. He also wrote between 1974 and 1998 dozens of large and small pieces for the magazine of the art club "Pulchri Studio". A selection:

- (in Dutch) Jacques den Haan, Herman Berserik : etsen en tekeningen, Amsterdam : Van Oorschot, 1963.
- (in Dutch) Jacques den Haan. Hermanus Berserik Gemeentemuseum Arnhem, Arnhem 1967.
- (in Dutch) Berserik Hermanus, Schetsboek van Hermanus Berserik. Van Spijk, Venlo 1977. ISBN 978-90-6216-154-6
- (in Dutch) Bolletjes op het water, brieven van Hermanus & Mien Berserik aan hun dochter Uitgave F. Berserik, Londen 1976.
- (in Dutch) Hermanus Berserik Bladvulling. Nijgh & van Ditmar, Amsterdam 1986. ISBN 978-90-236-7792-5
- (in Dutch) H. Berserik Berserik: na vijftig jaar schilderen. Nijgh & Van Ditmar, Amsterdam 1988. ISBN 978-90-236-5707-1
- (Dutch, with extensive summary in English) C. Vos et al. Hermanus Berserik 1921 - 2002. Werk. Erven Berserik Publishing, The Hague 2009. ISBN 978-90-812278-2-7
