= De Limburger =

Dutch newspaper

- Type: Daily newspaper
- Format: Tabloid
- Owner: Mediahuis
- Editor: Bjorn Oostra
- Founded: 1996
- Language: Dutch
- Headquarters: Maastricht (hoofdkantoor) en Venlo
- Circulation: 120,000
- Website: Limburger.nl

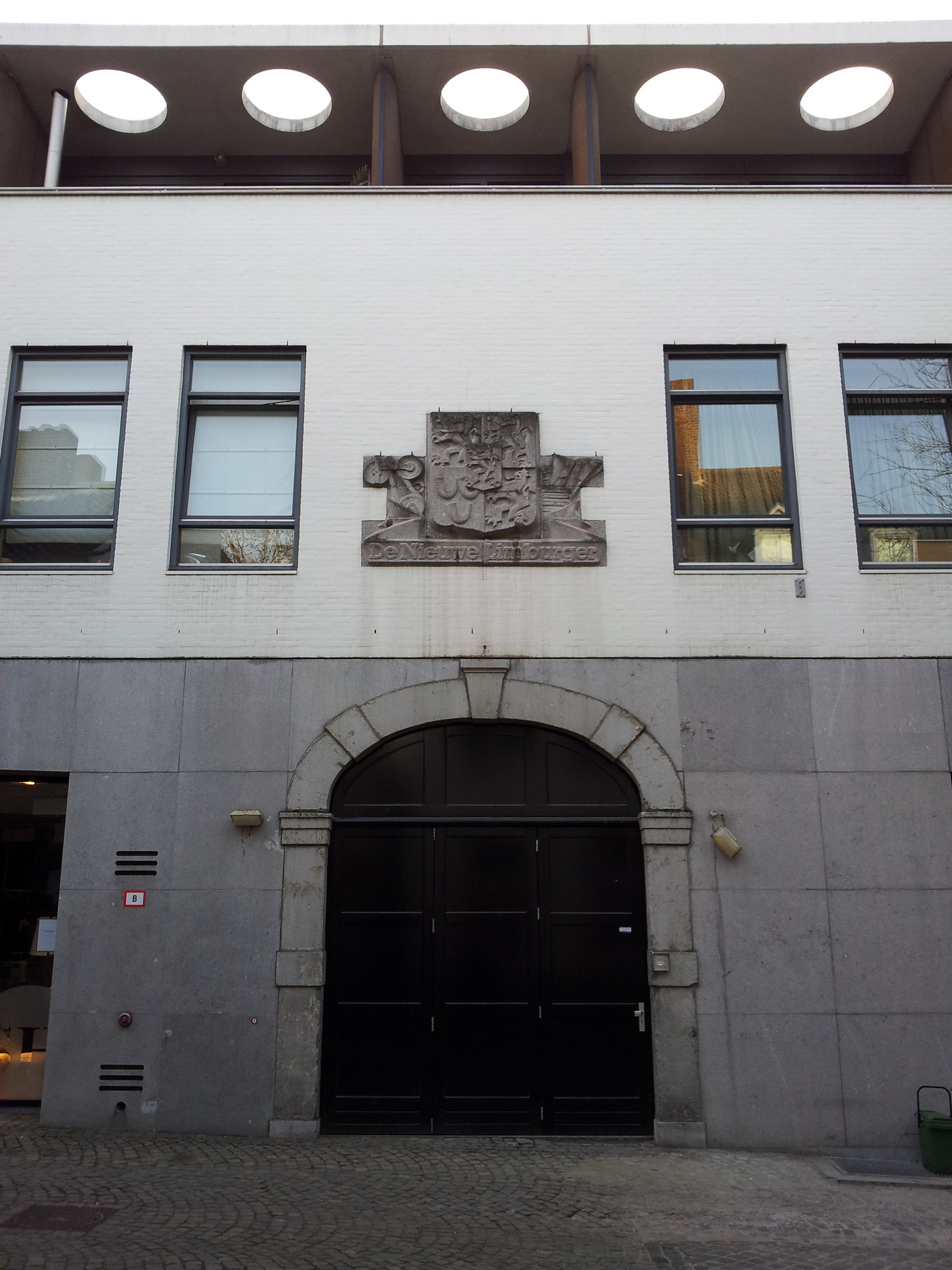
Former building of De Limburger

De Limburger is a Dutch newspaper covering the province of Limburg. The Limburgs Dagblad merged into De Limburger at the end 2017. Both newspapers were owned by Mediahuis. Dagblad De Limburger, the previous name of De Limburger, was founded after a merger of Dagblad voor Noord-Limburg and De Limburger.

== Merger history ==
- De Limburger (since 2016)
  - Limburgs Dagblad (1918–2017; gradually phased out)
  - Dagblad De Limburger (1996–2016)
    - Dagblad voor Noord-Limburg (18 April 1945 – 30 December 1995) (Northern Limburg)
      - Continuation of: Nieuwe venlosche courant (1908–1944) (Venlo)
        - Formerly: Venloosch nieuwsblad - Venloosche courant
          - Venloosche courant: nieuw weekblad (1869–1908)
            - Continuation of: Nieuw Venloosch Weekblad
          - Venloosch Nieuwsblad (1898–1908)
            - Continuation of: Venloosch weekblad (1863–1898)
    - De Limburger: Maas- en Roerbode (1 October 1971 – 30 December 1995)
      - Maas- en Roerbode (1945–1971) (Middle Limburg)
        - Continuation of: De Nieuwe koerier (1904–1944)
          - Maas- en Roerbode (1856–1904)
          - Provinciale Limburgse Courant
      - De Nieuwe Limburger (1955–1971) (South Limburg)
        - De Gazet van Limburg (1945–1955) (Maastricht)
          - Veritas (1935–1941, 1944–1945) (Maastricht)

== Limburgs Dagblad ==
Limburgs Dagblad
- Type: Daily newspaper
- Owner: Mecom Group
- Editor: Huub Paulissen
- Founded: 26 October 1918; 107 years ago
- Ceased publication: 29 December 2017
- Language: Dutch
- Headquarters: Sittard
- Circulation: 46,209 (2008)

Limburgs Dagblad was a Dutch newspaper published in Sittard, Limburg. Founded in 1918, in 2008 the newspaper had a circulation of 46,209. Its last issue was on 29 December 2017, after which the merger with De Limburger was complete.

Even before the merger was finalized, both newspapers operated as the Media Groep Limburg, owned by Mecom Group. The newspapers operated a common website. In 2000 both newspapers were acquired by De Telegraaf, however, the Netherlands Competition Authority would only agree to this if both newspapers would stay separate. In 2005 this demand was dropped, and since then the newspapers have been working towards more cooperation. In 2006 the Media Group Limburg was sold to the British Mecom Group.
