= Johannes Evert Hendrik Akkeringa =

Dutch painter

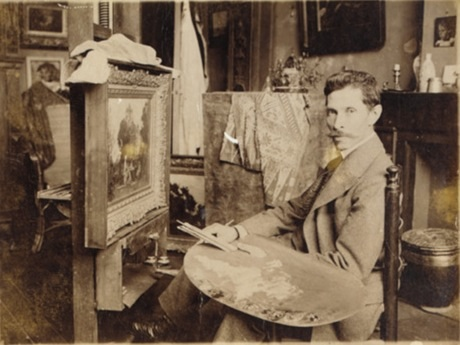
Johannes Evert Akkeringa (ca. 1890)

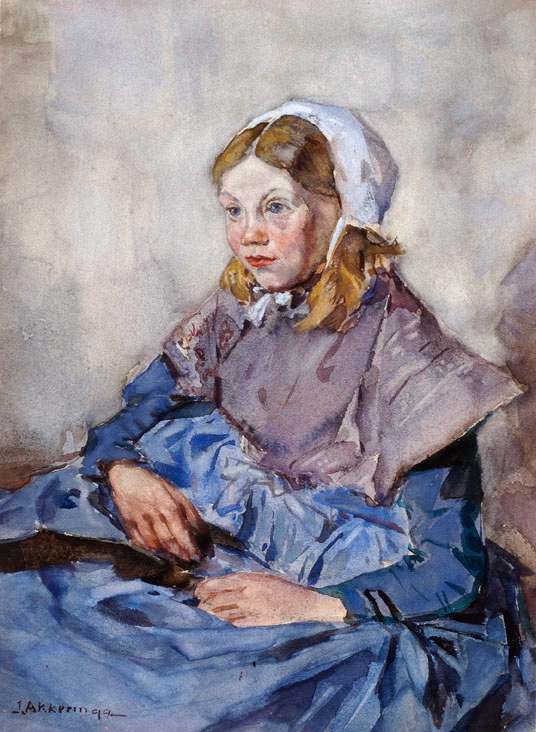
Young Girl in regional costume

Johannes Evert Hendrik Akkeringa (17 January 1861 – 12 April 1942) was part of the second generation of the Hague School painters. Akkeringa is primarily known for his paintings and watercolours of women and playing children at the beach, women mending nets and intimate tea-time conversations.

== Youth ==
Akkeringa was born in Blinjoe in the Dutch East Indies. He was the second child of Johannes Evert Akkeringa (1829–1863), an engineer in the tin mines of the Billiton-Company at Bangka, and later at Buitenzorg. His mother, Sariedje (born in 1842), was of mixed Chinese and Javanese ethnic origin. Following the death of his father in 1864 from typhus, Akkeringa moved with his brother and sister to The Hague, where they grew up in the household of his aunt.

== Academy ==
In the spring of 1878, at the age of seventeen, Akkeringa enrolled at the Royal Academy of Art in The Hague. He quickly befriended fellow student Willem de Zwart (1862–1931) and other artists studying at the academy, including Floris Verster (1861–1927) and Marius Bauer (1867–1932). It is likely that during this period Akkeringa met and became close to the artist Isaac Israëls (1865–1934). At the academy the courses Akkeringa took focussed on anatomical drawing, drawing from models, as well as studying the arts of perspective and composition. After class Akkeringa, like many of his fellow students, left the city to explore and practice the art of drawing nature, discovering that he was most inspired by the landscape around The Hague. In the spring of 1883 Akkeringa received his degree, though he continued to take classes at the academy until 1885.

From August 1886 until the end of 1887 Akkeringa took a course at the Rotterdam Academy. In the same year he participated for the first time in the ‘Living Masters Exhibition’ at the Royal Academy of Art in The Hague.

== Art societies ==
Late in 1887, Akkeringa moved to The Hague. Several months later, he moved again to Loosduinen to focus entirely on his painting. During this period, the so-called ‘Loosduinse painters colony’, or ‘The Hague Barbizon’, began. Artists involved in this movement besides Akkeringa included Willem de Zwart (1862–1931), who was a great influence on Akkringas style, George Hendrik Breitner (1857–1923), Jan Toorop (1858–1928), Theo van Hoytema (1863–1917), Hendrik Otto van Thol (1859–1902), Marius Bauer (1867–1932) and several others. The artists of the Hague School were attracted to Loosduinen and the surrounding dunes, because the area was viewed as one of the last remaining authentic natural landscapes in the region.

In October 1889, Akkeringa became a member of The Hague art society, Pulchri Studio. Among others, Akkeringa and Théophile de Brock established a board for The Hague Art Circle. Unlike the Pulchri Studio, The Hague Art Circle included art forms other than painting. On 26 June 1892, Hendrik Haverman proposed Akkeringa as a friend of the art society 'Arti et Amicitiae'. On 25 February 1897 Akkeringa along with his friend Floris Arntzenius (1864–1925), was adopted as a member of the 'Hollandsche Teekenmaatschappij', of which he was a board member from 1912 to 1917.

In February 1892, Akkeringa, Jan Toorop, Marius Bauer and Willem de Zwart were commissioned to illustrate a collection of fairy tales published by the Amsterdam publishing house Elsevier. The book, by Louse Ahn-De Jongh, was titled A Book of Imagination, Fairy Tales and Stories and was published in 1893. From November 1892 to October 1896 Akkeringa continued to work as an illustrator for Elsevier's 'Geïllustreerd Maandschrift' (the 'Illustrated Monthly'), to earn extra money.

== Family life ==
On 15 September 1892 Akkeringa married his niece Willemina Suzanna (Mien) Reedijk (1866–1909), and the young couple moved to a house on the outskirts of The Hague. Shortly afterwards two sons were born, Leonard Johannes (Leo) (1893–1959) and Johannes Evert (Jan) (1894–1983). During their marriage the couple regularly moved around the growing city of The Hague and the nearby village of Scheveningen. Akkeringa preferred to live in homes on the outskirts of the city; not only did the landscapes of where he lived inspire him, but often his sons and their friends became the subjects of his paintings. In April 1903 the family, including his mother-in-law, moved to the village of Heeze in the province of North Brabant. Their home was known as 'Villa Erica'. The landscape of Heeze is the subject of many of Akkeringa's paintings. In 1905 the family went to live in Scheveningen, where Akkeringa's wife Mien died on 12 December 1909.

On 20 April 1917, when Akkeringa was sixty-five, he married the thirty-two-year-old Elsje Wilhelmine Enter (1895–1969). On 27 August 1921 his third son, Evert Hendrik Jan Akkeringa, was born. In 1932 Akkeringa visited his oldest son Leo, who lived in Paris; it would be the only foreign trip Akkeringa would ever make.

Akkeringa died at the age of eighty-one. He was buried on 15 April 1942 at Rusthof cemetery in Amersfoort. In May that year an exhibition was held by members of the Pulchri Studio to commemorate his life and work. On 23 March 1943 the contents of Akkeringa's studio were auctioned off by the Amsterdam auction house Frederik Muller & Cie.

== Works and exhibitions ==
In 1903, Akkringa was offered a contract by the Amsterdam-based art dealer E.J. van Wisselingh. His work was not only exhibited in Amsterdam, but also at the London branch of the company. He participated in several international exhibitions in Hamburg (1902), Budapest (1908), Berlin (1908), Pittsburgh (1904, 1907 and 1909), Buenos Aires (1910), Brussels (1910) and the Canadian city of Winnipeg (1913). From 1903 to 1914 Van Wisselingh organized a yearly exhibition at the Pulchri Studio where the work of Akkeringa was regularly shown with, in April 1904, a joint exhibition of the works of Akkeringa and fellow Dutch Indo Jan Toorop. In mid-1909 Akkeringa built a studio in the dunes at Meijendel, between The Hague and Wassenaar. The studio was financed by Van Wisselingh and served as a classroom in which Akkeringa taught his students.

In 1914 Akkeringa participated in the Venice Biennale, and the exposition ‘Tentoonstelling van werk van Nederlandsche, in Indië geboren schilders’ at the Dutch art-circle at Batavia. In 1918, Akkringa passed his secondary vocational-course at the Royal Academy of Art in The Hague, and he was appointed teacher for hand-drawing. In December 1921 Akkeringa had his first retrospective exhibition in the rooms of the Pulchri Studio. The exhibition was organized by the art dealer Van Wisselingh. In early 1924 Akkeringa's contract with Van Wisseling, which included a monthly allowance, ended.

A jubilee exhibition was organized at Pulchri Studio in January 1932 on Akkeringa's seventy-first birthday. On 17 January 1932 an anniversary celebration was organized at Pulchri Studio, at which Akkeringa received a portfolio by his friends and admirers.

In May 1942 the last retrospective exhibition of Akkeringa's work opened in commemoration of the painter. After this exhibition Akkeringa, and mostly his work, was largely forgotten by the public. In mid-2005, the painter and his work were brought to the attention of the public again by an exhibition, organized by auction house Christie's Amsterdam, called: 'J.E.H. Akkeringa; schilders van tuin en duin'. His work is regularly sold at auction today.

== Prizes ==
- A first official token of recognition came on 28 February 1887, when Akkeringa won the Royal subsidy for the year 1887, by the commission of the Royal Subsidies of Arti et Amicitiae.
- In January 1890, Akkeringa won the Willink van Collen-competition with his watercolour Een Wandeling in het duin. In February 1894, he won the prize for a second time.
- In 1900 Akkeringa won a gold medal at the World's Fair in Paris.
- In 1905 Akkeringa received a silver medal from Queen Mother Emmaeen, for his work at the exhibition Gemeentelijkse Tentoonstellingen van Kunstwerken van Levende Meesters in Arnhem (derde Vierjaarlijksche).
- In 1909 Akkeringa again received a gold medal on the exhibition in Arnhem, and received a second gold medal in June on the exhibition X-Internationale Kunst Ausstellung in Munich.
- In May 1910 Akkeringa won a bronze medal with a beach view at the Exposición Internacional del Centenario in Buenos Aires.
