= Johan D. Scherft =

Dutch etcher (1891–1969)

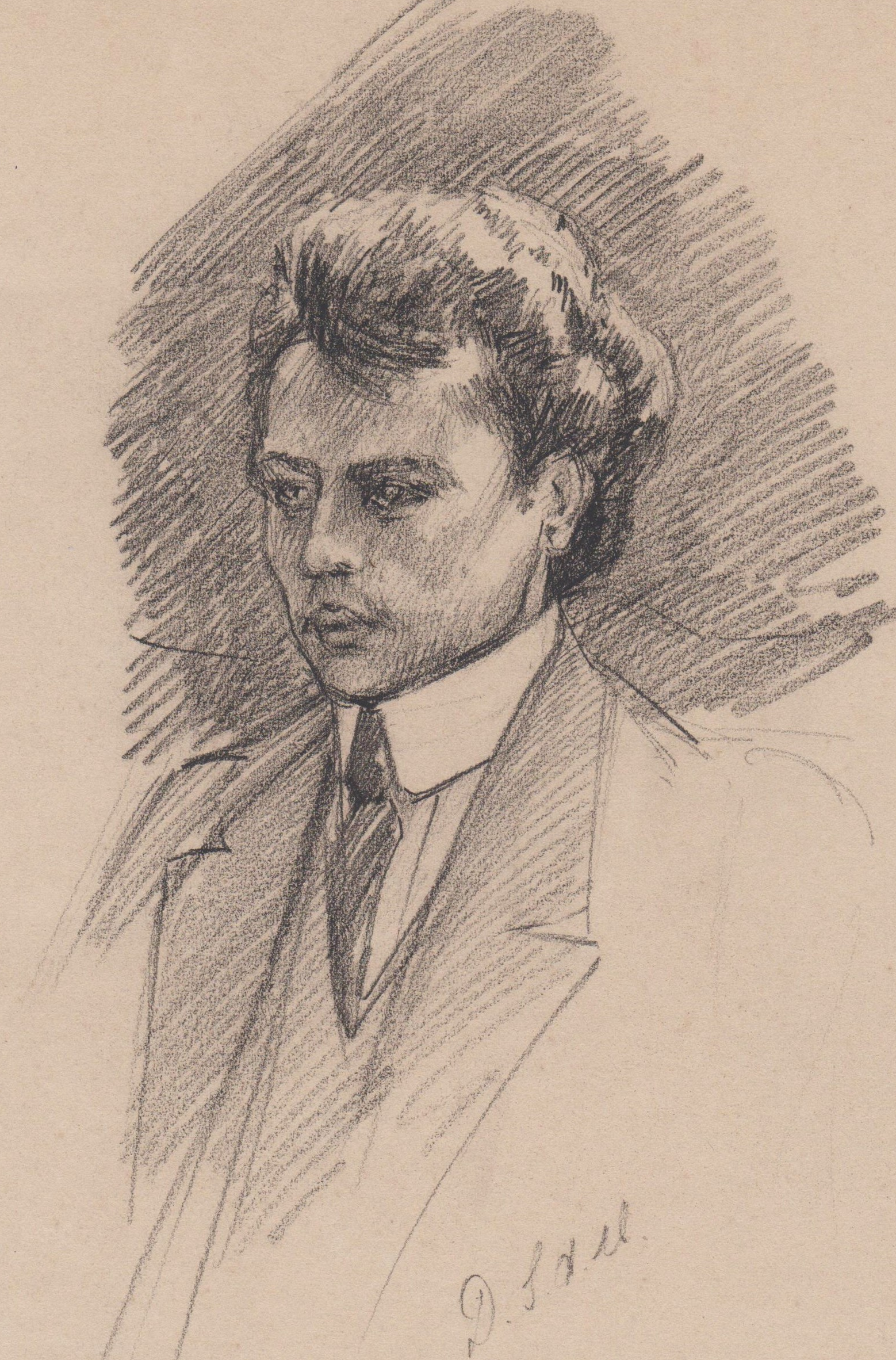
- Portrait by Dora Struick du Moulin (ca. 1917)
- Born: 18 August 1891; The Hague, Netherlands
- Died: 8 August 1969 (aged 77); The Hague, Netherlands

Johannes Daniël Scherft (18 August 1891 – 8 August 1969) was a Dutch etcher, painter, etching printer, and gallery owner.

== Early life ==
Scherft was born to a working-class family. His father worked as a shoemaker and ed as a police officer. In 1920, Scherft married Antonia Cornelia van der Marel. The couple had three daughters and one son. Scherft is the grandfather of Dutch sculptor Johan Scherft (1970).

Scherft was a member of the IOOF, Arti et Industriae and the Haagse Kunstkring.

== Career ==
Scherft's career as a typographer and etching printer began in 1903. As an apprentice printer, he started working at printing house H.P. de Swart & Son in The Hague, where he remained until 1916. From 1912, he attended an evening course at the Bik & Vaandrager drawing institute, together with Henri and Anton Pieck. From 1915, he started printing etchings for students on a small etching press. In 1916, Scherft was called up for military service. During his leaves of absence, Scherft continued to print etchings and purchased a large etching press, which formed the basis of the printing house that he operated until his death.

Scherft ran several printing houses and art galleries in The Hague. From 1920 to 1924, he operated Kunstzaal Graficus in partnership with another printing house. During the 1920s, Scherft established an etching, book, and commercial printing house. In 1932, he opened an art gallery. In his art gallery, Scherft exhibited works of dozens of Dutch and foreign artists, including Pablo Picasso, James Ensor, and M.C. Escher. In 1932, Scherft exhibited Picasso's works, marking one of the artist's earliest showcases in the Netherlands. In 1933, Escher was one of the first artists to have a solo exhibition in Scherft's gallery. In 1941, Scherft organized another exhibition dedicated to Escher's work, showcasing his later famous woodcuts, including the iconic Day and Night.

Scherft also printed commercial works. In addition to etchings, Scherft printed linocuts, woodcuts, and wood engravings. He printed the work of over two hundred artists, including Philip Zilcken, Willem de Zwart, Samuel Jessurun de Mesquita and Paul Citroen.

He was active as an artist. He made about 150 etchings, mostly cityscapes. He made paintings and watercolors, especially still lifes and nature scenes.

In May 1943, during the German occupation, the printing house had to close. The German authorities confiscated most of his machinery and printing tools, leaving only the etching press.

Scherft continued to work as an etching printer and graphic artist until shortly before his death in 1969. Ton van Os was one of the last artists who Scherft printed.

=== Subjects ===
- Adriaan van ‘t Hoff
- Hermanus Berserik
- Miguel-Ángel Cárdenas
- Jeanne Bieruma Oosting
- Cees Bolding

== Permanent Collections ==
Leiden University Library and the Rijksmuseum in Amsterdam possess a collection of etchings and drawings by Johan D. Scherft.

== Bibliography ==
- Vervoorn, A.J. (2003). "Johan D. Scherft, etser én drukker". Boekenpost. Vol. 11. pp. 22–23.
- Scherft, J.P. (2006). Een Haagse graficus : leven en werk van Johan D. Scherft. Leiden. ISBN 9789090203973.
- Hinrichs, Jacob (2024). Inventaris Collectie Scherft : een collectie uit de nalatenschap van Johan D. Scherft (1891-1969). Rhoon: Stichting Collectie Scherft.
