= Van Hoytema =

Van Hoytema is a surname. Notable people with the surname include:

- Antoinette van Hoytema, Dutch artist
- Hoyte van Hoytema (born 1971), Dutch cinematographer
- Theo van Hoytema (1863–1913), Dutch lithographer, illustrator and graphic designer
