= Anna Gildemeester =

Dutch painter (1867–1945)

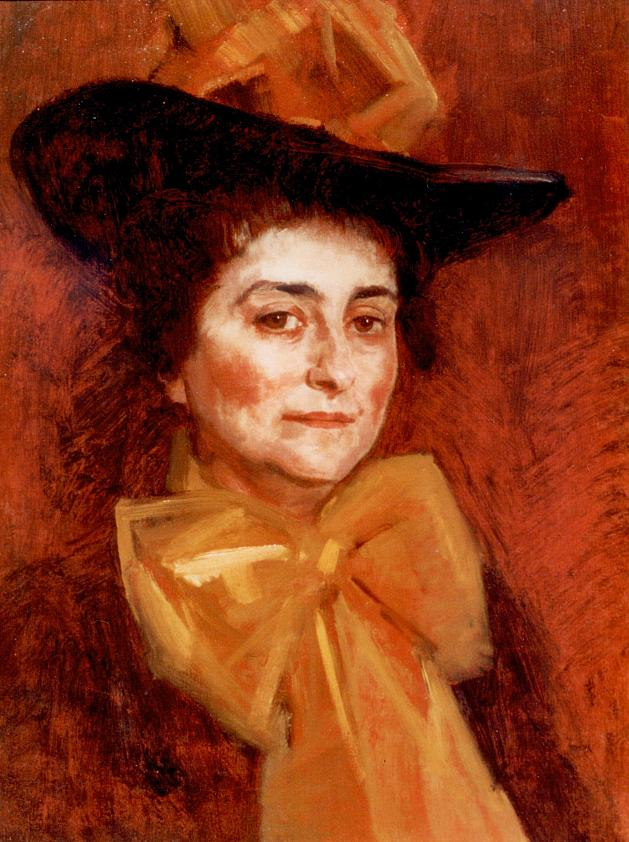
Self-portrait of Anna Gildemeester

Anna Gildemeester (5 December 1867, in Amsterdam – 1 January 1945, in Florence) was a Dutch painter, best remembered for her still life, portraits, and landscape paintings in the style of the Hague School. A graduate of the Rijksakademie van beeldende kunsten, she was a member of the Arti et Amicitiae, and the Haagse Kunstkring. Her works were often exhibited at the Stedelijk Museum Amsterdam from 1895 to 1918.
