= Marie van Zeggelen =

Dutch writer, editor, and painter (1870–1957)

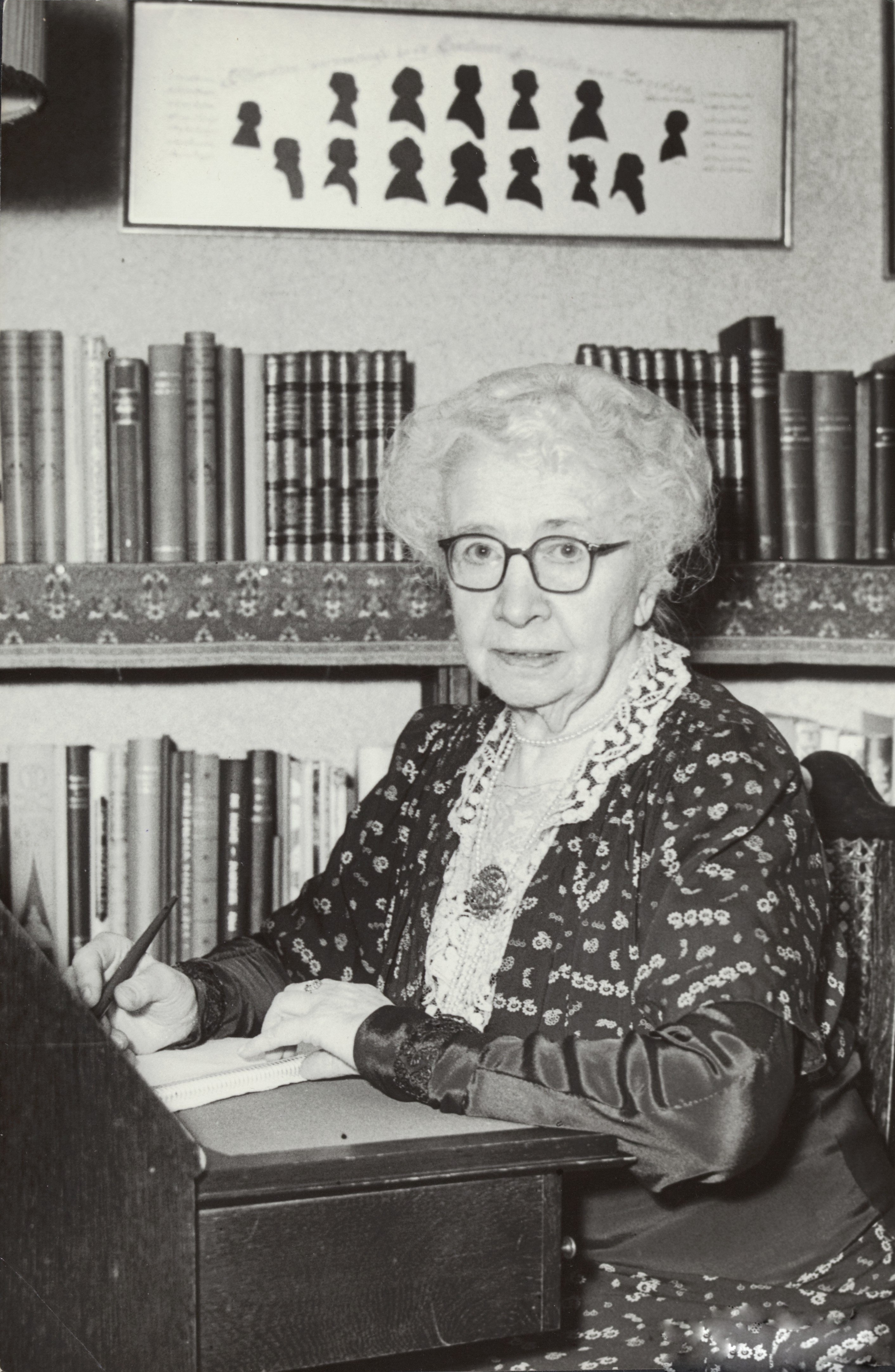
- Born: Maria Christina van Zeggelen; 8 July 1870; The Hague, Netherlands
- Died: 15 July 1957 (aged 87); Huizen, Netherlands
- Other name: Marie Kooij-van Zeggelen
- Occupations: Writer, educator and painter
- Notable work: De gouden kris (1908); Averij (1928); Een liefde in Kennemerland (1936)

Maria Christina "Marie" van Zeggelen (8 July 1870 – 15 July 1957) was a Dutch writer, educator and painter. She best known for her children's books and books about Indonesia. Van Zeggelen told a story from the perspective of the Indonesian population and children. She was an advocate for the rights of Indonesian women.

== Biography ==
Van Zeggelen was born on 8 July 1870 as Maria Christina van Zeggelen in the Hague. She came from an artistic family. Her father, W.J. van Zeggelen, was a printer and a poet, and her mother was a painter. In 1884, she started to study at the Royal Academy of Art under Philip Zilcken, and graduated in 1890. In 1890, she married Herman Kooij, an officer in the Royal Netherlands East Indies Army. Three days later, they left on the Prins Frederik to Indonesia. On 25 June 1890, Prins Frederik collided with Marpessa in the Bay of Biscay, and sank within minutes. Van Zeggelen would later use the event in her book Averij (1928).

=== In Indonesia ===
Van Zeggelen was unhappy in Indonesia. The confinement in a group of European officers and wives depressed her. According to van Zeggelen, the people were superficial and only wanted to become rich quick. She started to feel homesick for the intellectual and artistic stimulation of The Hague. They would also move 26 times within the Indonesian archipelago. Her attempts at painting the landscape also failed.

In 1897, her first son was born and died soon after birth. She was told that she would be unable to have children. Van Zeggelen started to fill the emptiness by frantically writing stories, and sending the stories back home. Her half-brother decided to pass the stories on to Nellie van Kol who published them in Ons Blaadje.

In 1906, they moved to Watansoppeng, South Sulawesi where she was accepted by the local population. She would refer to this period as a good time. She also started to view the Dutch as intruders. When they returned to Java, 18 months later, she started to write De gouden kris (1908) written from the perspective of La Bello, a Buginese boy from a noble family, who is being raised by an uncle who has subjugated to the Dutch rule.

In 1910, she wrote De Hollandsche vrouw, a critical novel about the way the colony was being ruled, however she still stressed the necessity to civilise the population. Van Zeggelen became a teacher for the Indonesian children. In the book she described that cheap opium was being distributed to the native population by the government with the intend of raising prices later on.

Van Zeggelen became an activist for women's rights. In 1912, she founded STOVIA, a school for the training of native physicians together with Charlotte Jacobs. She also became secretary for the Society for Women's Suffrage in Batavia. In 1913, van Zeggelen organised the Dutch East Indies entry for De Vrouw 1813–1913, a feminist exhibition in Amsterdam. In 1916, they returned to the Netherlands.

=== In the Netherlands ===
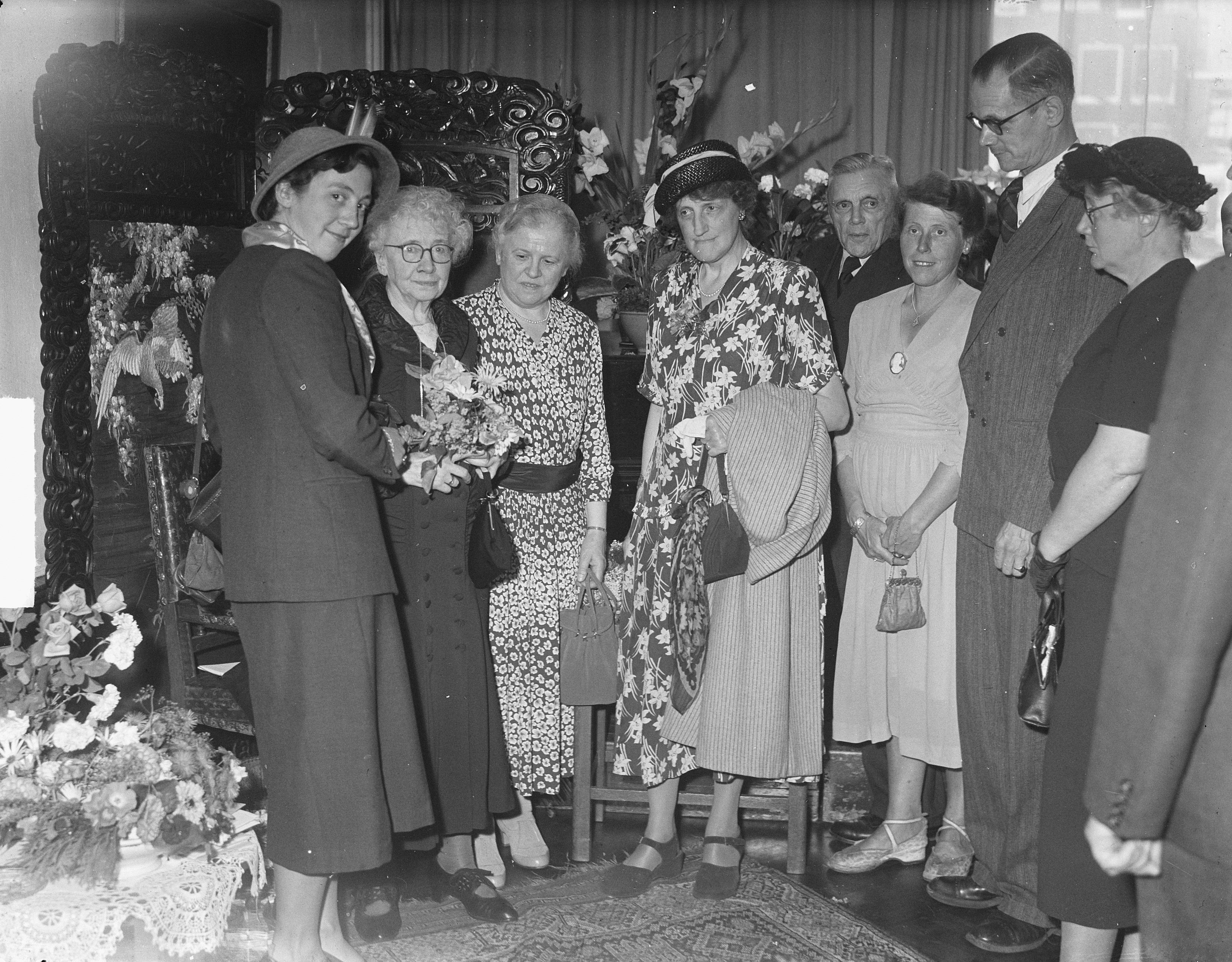
Marie van Zeggelen on her 80th birthday

Back in the Netherlands, van Zeggelen became editor of De Hollandsche Lelie, a magazine for girls. In 1921, her marriage ended in divorce. Van Zeggelen would become a full-time professional writer. Her first novels were still set in Indonesia, however after 1924, she started to write historical novels set in the Netherlands. In 1928, the publishing house van Holkema & Warendorf organized a competition for children's books. Van Zeggelen submitted Averij, an adventure story, which won the prize for best book for boys.

In 1936, van Zeggelen wrote Een liefde in Kennemerland, a historical novel set in Haarlem which was well received. During World War II, she moved to the Betuwe and refused to register at the Dutch Chamber of Culture, an organisation to which authors had to belong in order to publish, because she preferred to live in poverty then to submit to the new order.

Van Zeggelen died in Huizen on 15 July 1957 at the age of 87.
