= Edzard Koning =

Dutch painter (1869–1954)

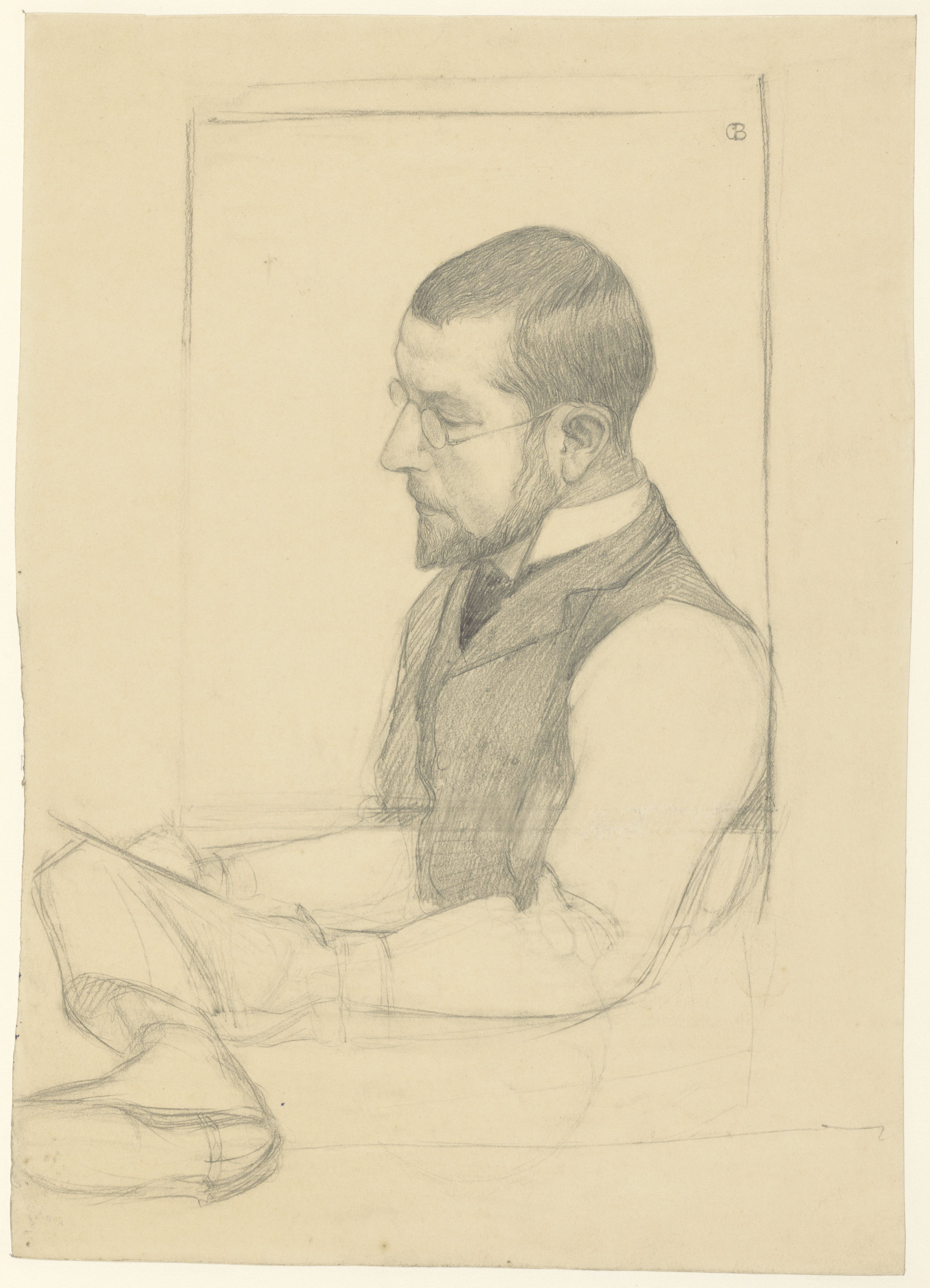
- Portret of Edzard Koning by Theo Colenbrander
- Born: 3 May 1869; Winschoten, Netherlands
- Died: 21 February 1954 (aged 84); The Hague, Netherlands
- Occupation: Painter

Edzard Koning (3 May 1869 – 21 February 1954) was a Dutch painter. His work was part of the painting event in the art competition at the 1936 Summer Olympics. Koning's work was included in the 1939 exhibition and sale Onze Kunst van Heden (Our Art of Today) at the Rijksmuseum in Amsterdam. His elder brother, Arnold Hendrik Koning, was also a painter.
