= Arnold Hendrik Koning =

Dutch artist (1860–1945)

Nol Koning
- Born: Arnold Hendrik Koning; 2 April 1860; Winschoten, Netherlands
- Died: 20 January 1945 (aged 84); Barneveld, Netherlands
- Education: Rijksacademie van Beeldende Kunsten
- Movement: Hague School

Arnold "Nol" Hendrik Koning (2 April 1860 – 20 January 1945) was a Dutch painter. He painted in the style of the Hague School.

== Life ==
Koning was born into a family of lawyers and administrators from Groningen. After completing the gymnasium in Winschoten, he left for Amsterdam to study at the Rijksacademie voor Beeldende Kunsten.

In 1886, he made his debut by participating in an exhibition in Pictura (Groningen). The same year he moved to The Hague, for courses at the Royal Academy of Art. In 1887, he left for Paris for nine months. There he met Theo van Gogh, art dealer for Goupil & Cie, and his older brother Vincent. After the latter left Paris for the South in the spring of 1888, Arnold was given a place in Theo's apartment on Rue Lepic. Letters have been handed down from the friendship.

Back in the Netherlands, Koning went to live in The Hague again and traveled through the Netherlands to paint. With his brother Edzard Willem Koning, who was nine years younger, who also came to study at the Hague academy, he was part of the Hague painting culture. Koning married in 1893 and moved to Rijswijk. Two children were born from the marriage. In 1897, the family moved to Ede. A divorce followed in 1909. Shortly afterwards he had a house built on the outskirts of the nearby village of Voorthuizen, in which he would continue to work on an extensive oeuvre until an old age, in order to be in the middle of nature as much as possible. That oeuvre consists mainly of landscapes, although Koning has occasionally painted cityscapes and genre scenes. At first his style was closely related to the Hague School, but later became looser and more colorful. In addition to oil paintings, he also regularly made watercolors and pastels. He remarried and combined painting with a simple life as a small farmer. In the winter of 1944-45, Koning fell down the cellar stairs at home and died.

Koning was a member of Arti et Amicitiae, Pulchri Studio, the Haagse Kunstkring and Pictura Veluvensis.

He died in Barneveld, Netherlands.

== Painting style ==
When Koning started studying at the Rijksacademie in 1880, the Dutch impressionism of the Hague School was the leading style. Koning mastered this style and remained true to it throughout his working life. Already in Paris, and later through the work of colleagues and in the artists' associations, he must have seen all the successive innovations around the turn of the century, but they ignored his style.

Koning painted the traditional Dutch landscape of fishermen and farmers. He used a loose, flowing style, in which the less important visual elements were suggested with a single brushstroke. This style was his reliable vehicle for capturing the atmosphere of the landscape.

Koning loved nature. The urbanization around The Hague drove him to the unspoilt Veluwe. But the innovation caught up with him. The modernization of the Netherlands with the increase in scale in agriculture and the closure of the Zuiderzee transformed the landscape of farmers and fishermen. To Koning, that change felt like destruction. From 1920 he retired to Voorthuizen. He had his garden and his animals. The chicken coop at the back of the garden dominated his small paintings.

Only a limited number of landscapes in Koning's paintings can be located. He did not consider it important to date and place his work. If titles are already known, a painting is called: On the edge of a town or Dorpsstraat in Overijssel. He was concerned with the atmosphere in the cultural landscape.

== Work in Dutch collections ==
- The Van Gogh Museum in Amsterdam owns several paintings by Koning from Theo van Gogh's estate. After 1888 Koning sent work to Theo to sell in Paris. They also have many letters in their archive referencing Koning, including letters to and from Theo as well as to and from Vincent van Gogh. Recently authenticated Van Gogh shows same scene as Koning's painting "Stairs in Montmartre".
- The Drents Museum in Assen manages the collection of the Fine Arts Foundation around 1900. Arnold Hendrik Koning is represented in this collection.
- The Groninger Museum is a site. The museum has drawings and in 2003 an important work by Arnold Koning was acquired.
- The municipalities of Barneveld and Ede also own Arnold Koning's work (mostly through donations).

Private collections - Arnold Koning may have been largely forgotten, but there are still a limited number of private collectors of his work. An exhibition was put together from these collections in 2008 in Harderwijk. At the same time there was an exhibition of work by Edzard Koning at the Veluws Museum Nairac in Barneveld.

Values of his paintings are starting to climb as his recognition and association with van Gogh has peaked collectors interest around the world. Recent additions of his works to the Van Gogh Museum in Amsterdam in 2010 has illustrated this interest.

== More information ==
Arnold Koning was listed as one member of a rare antique group photograph of Vincent van Gogh and friends that was auctioned in 2015 but did not hit its reserve of $136,000. It appears to show the artist drinking with fellow post-Impressionists Paul Gauguin and Émile Bernard, among others, would be only the third confirmed photo of van Gogh to date.

The Dutch database of the National Office for Art History Documentation provides information about the painter Arnold Koning. (RKD about Arnold Koning)

Elizabeth Yates (granddaughter of Edzard Koning) wrote a book about Arnold & Edzard Koning: Yates, Elizabeth. Royal art from Paris to the Veluwe. Royal BDU Publishers, 2008

(Book cover translation) "Impressionists Arnold (1860-1945) and Edzard Koning (1869-1954) are well-known and beloved artists. Edzard achieved fame as an illustrator of 'De kleine Johannes' and the 'Verkade Albums'. Arnold, partly influenced by his friendship and correspondence with Vincent van Gogh, left beautiful landscape paintings. Like all impressionists of the Hague School, they were genuine romantics who believed in an inspired nature. Their working life was characterized by a 'flight forwards', via Paris and The Hague, away from urbanization and industrialization and back to nature in the quiet Veluwe, near the estates along the IJssel, around Ede and Nunspeet, and finally in the Veluwse Voorthuizen to unwind. The area from the IJssel to the Zuiderzee was their great source of inspiration. They also wandered through the Netherlands, from Friesland to Zeeland, to visualize their impressions. Art historian Elizabeth Yates, granddaughter of Edzard Koning, places the life and work of the Koning brothers against the cultural background of the dynamic era around 1900."

== Gallery ==
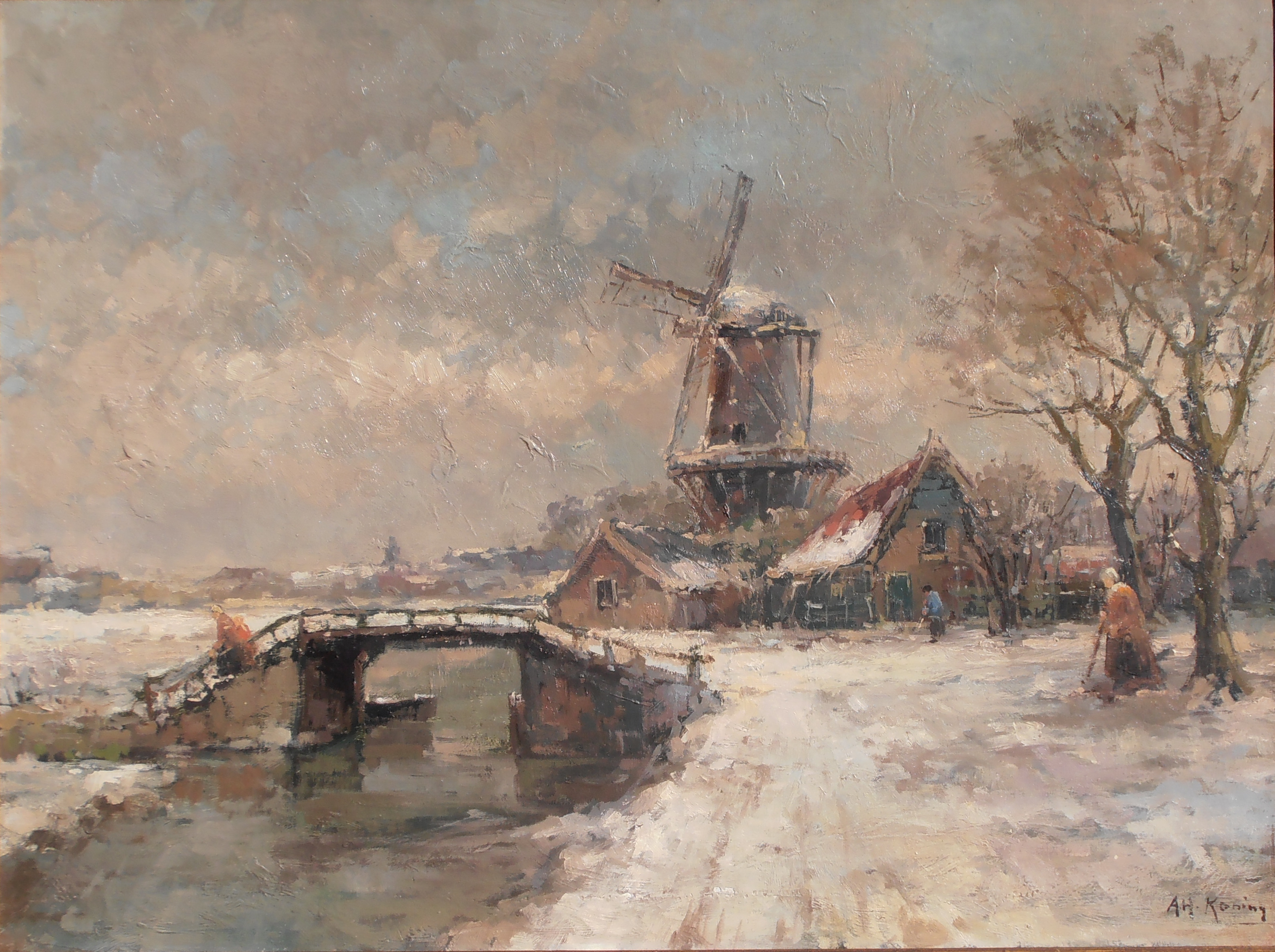
Winterlandschap met molen (ca.1886)

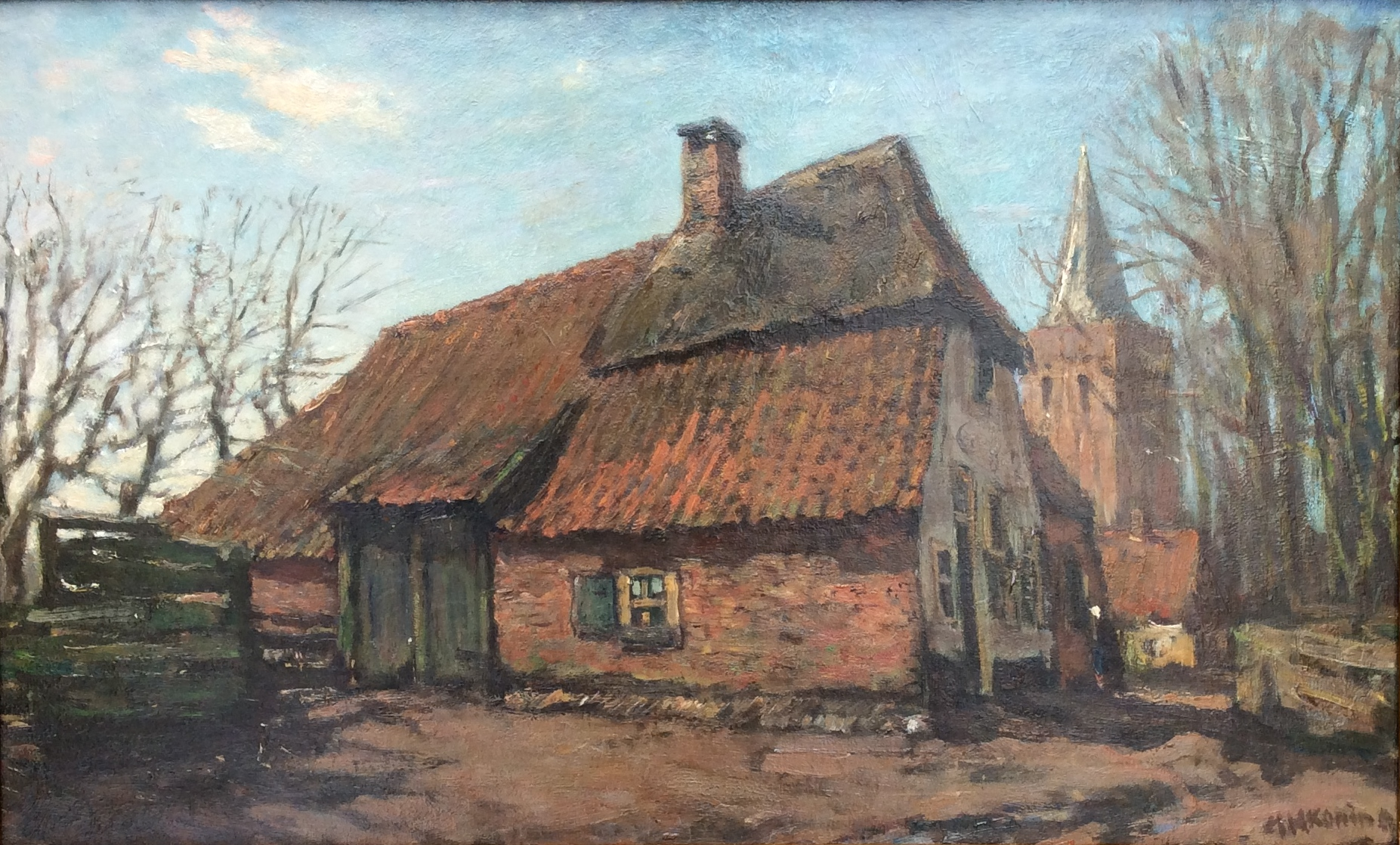
Boerderij met op de achtergrond de Oude Kerk van Ede (ca.1905)

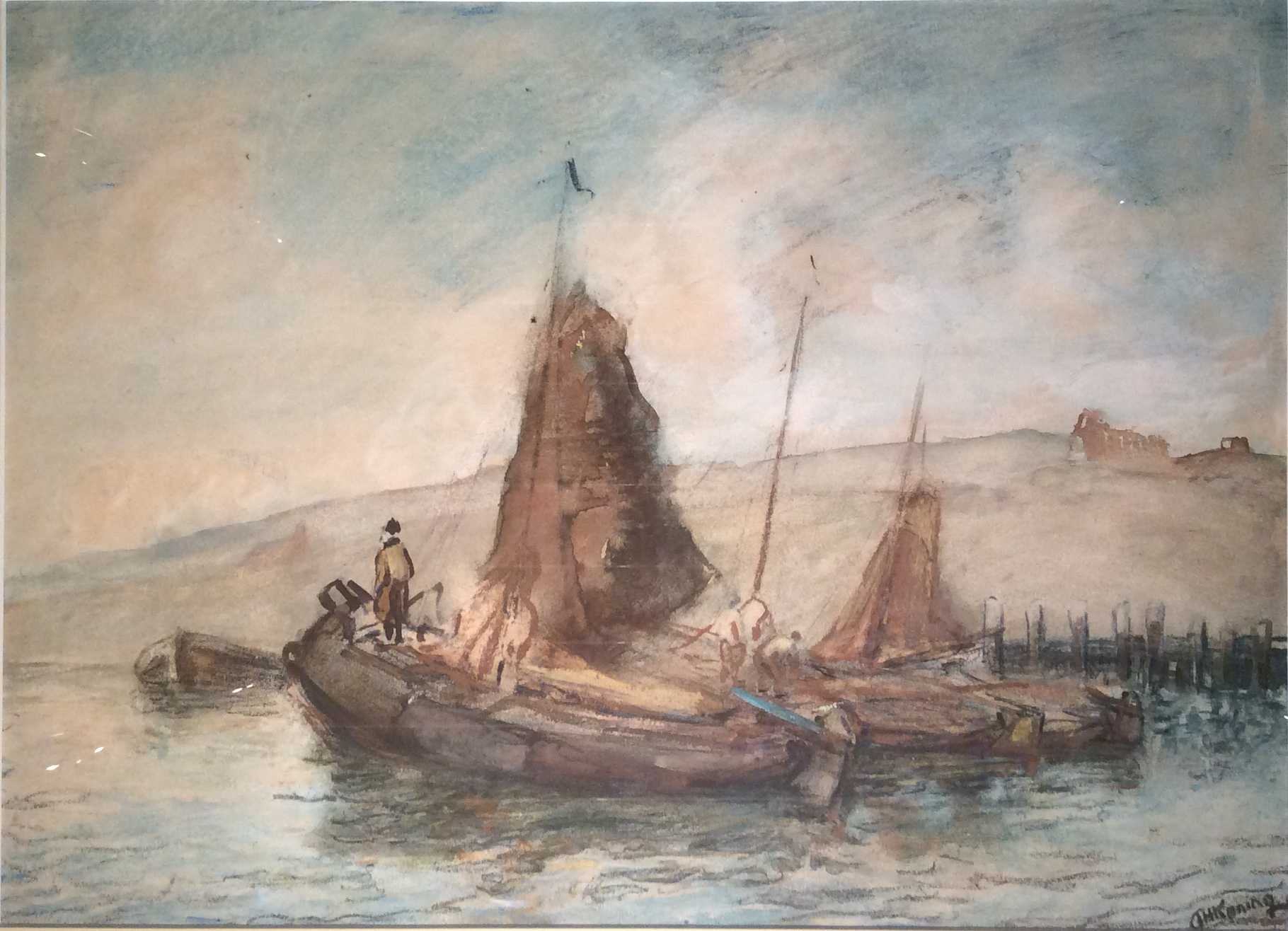
Afgemeerde botters (ca.1910)

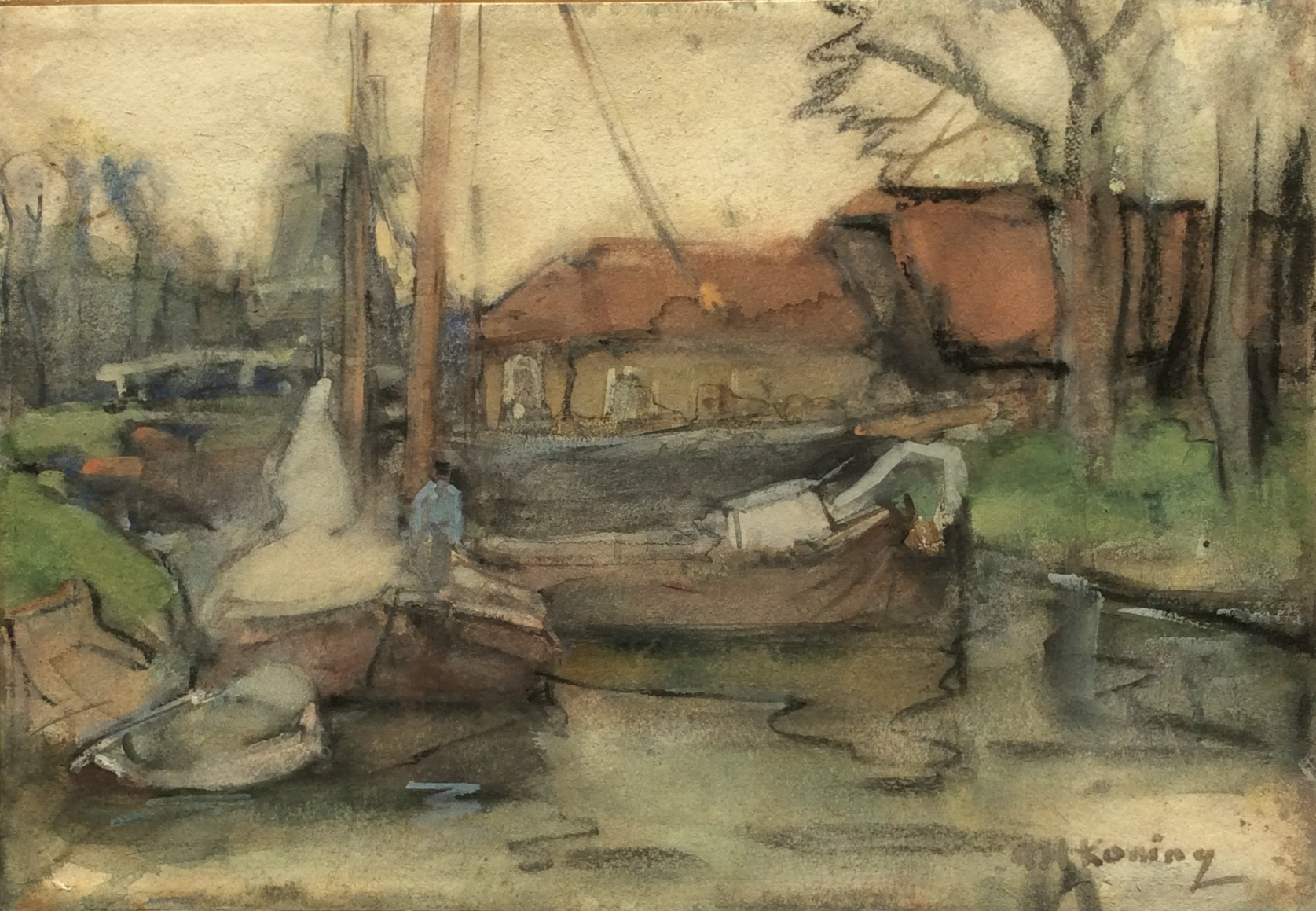
Schepen in binnenhaven

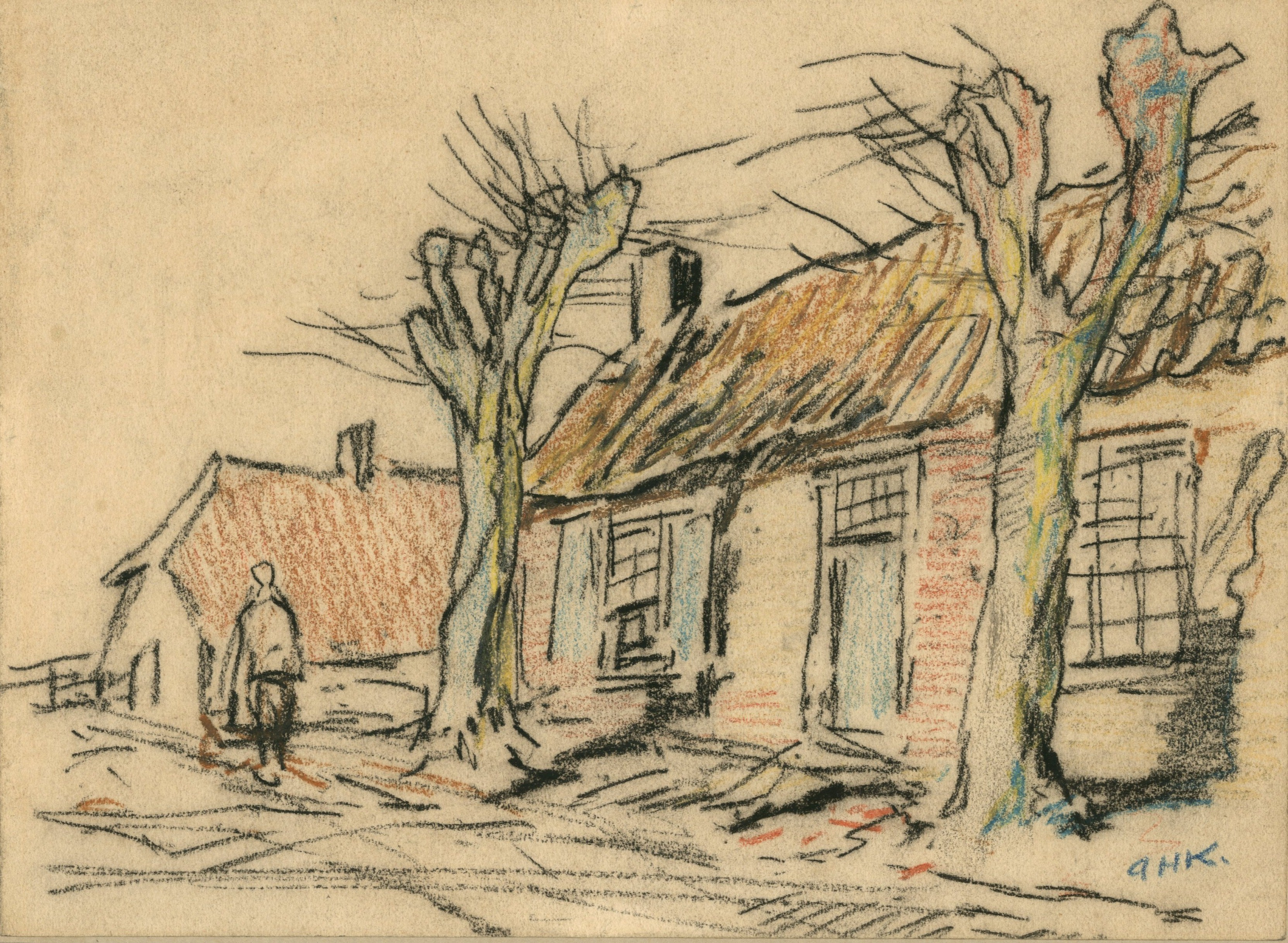
Boerenhuisjes Ede

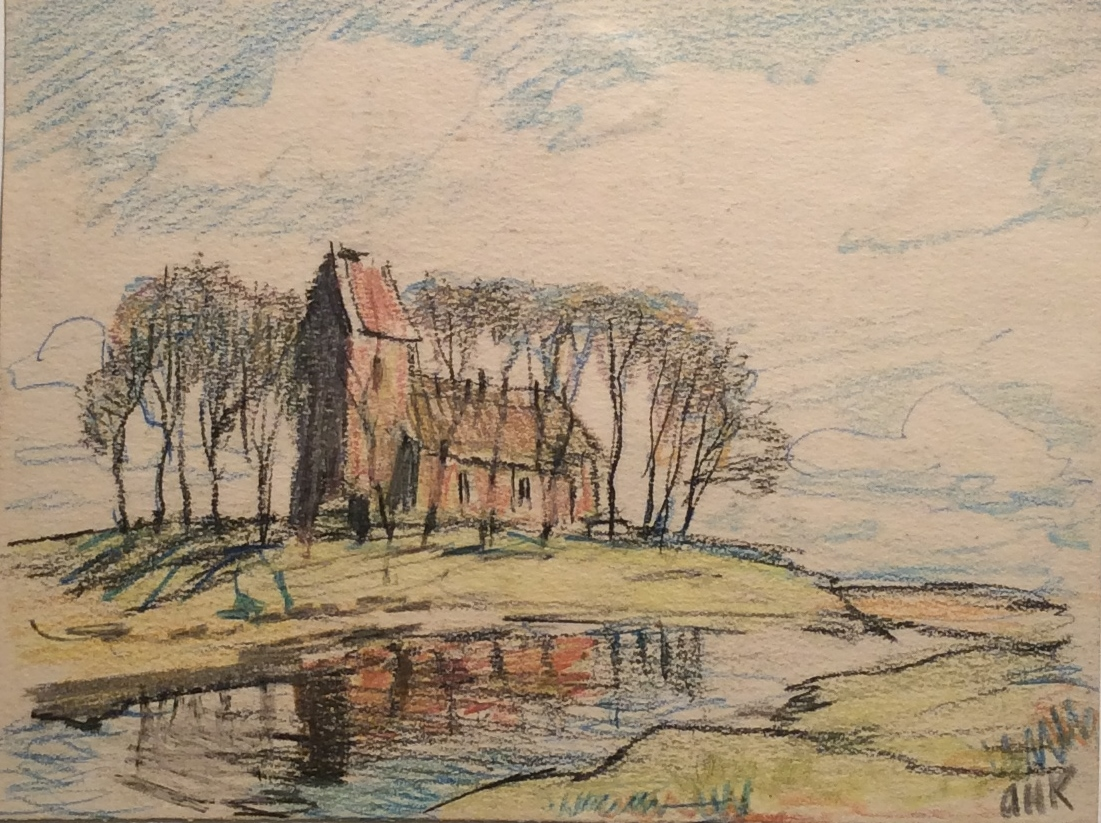
Kerk van Marsum

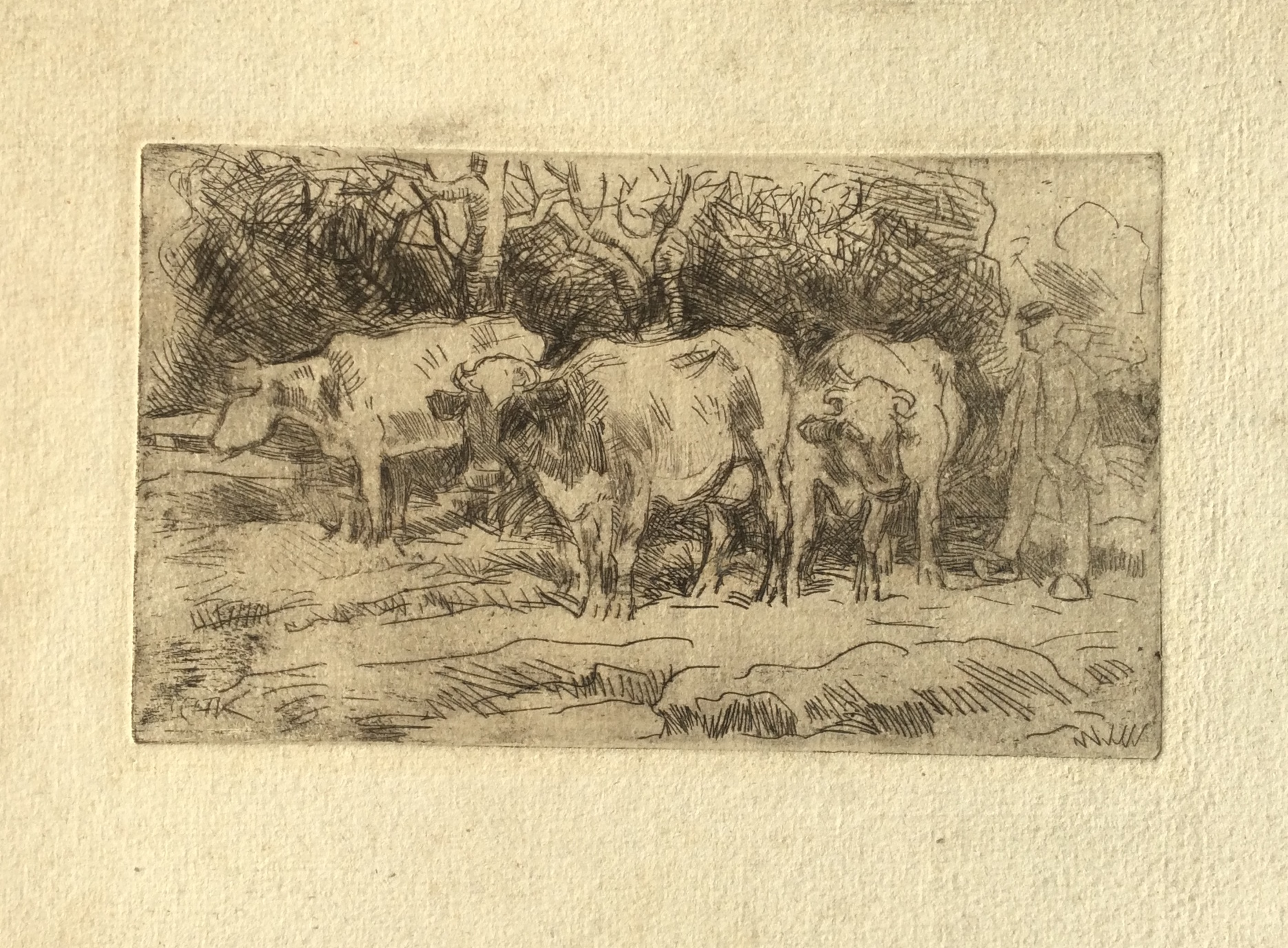
Boer met koeien

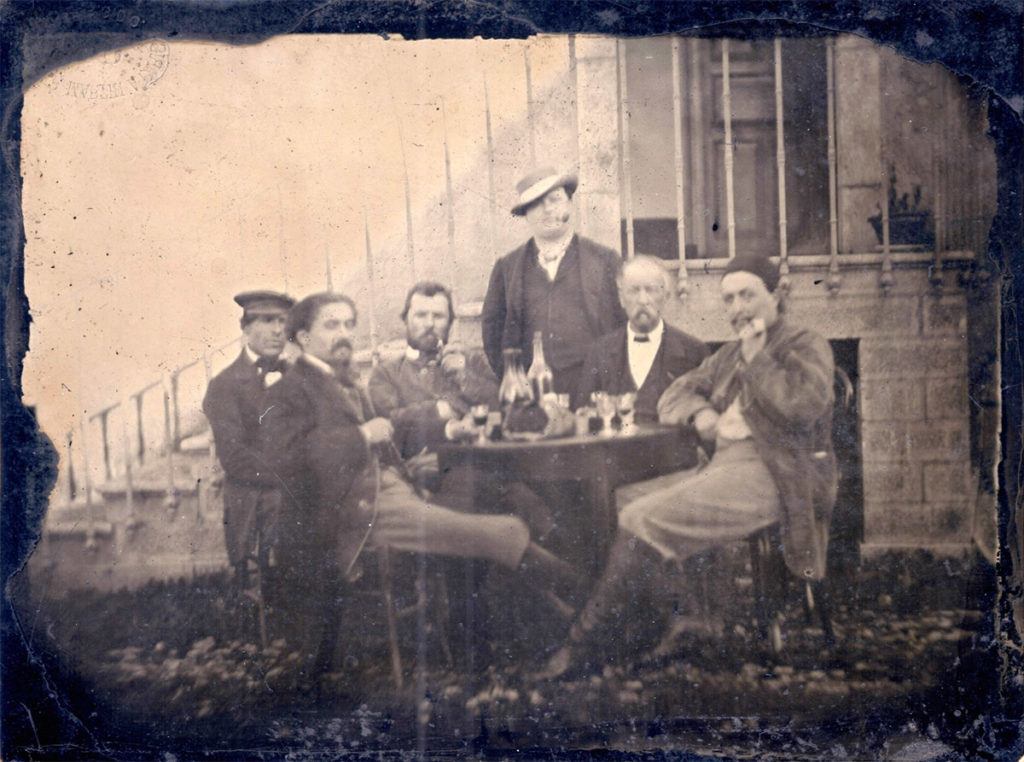
Possible group picture of Van Gogh taken in 1887 with Paul Gauguin and Émile Bernard

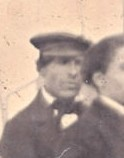
Artist Arnold Koning in 1887

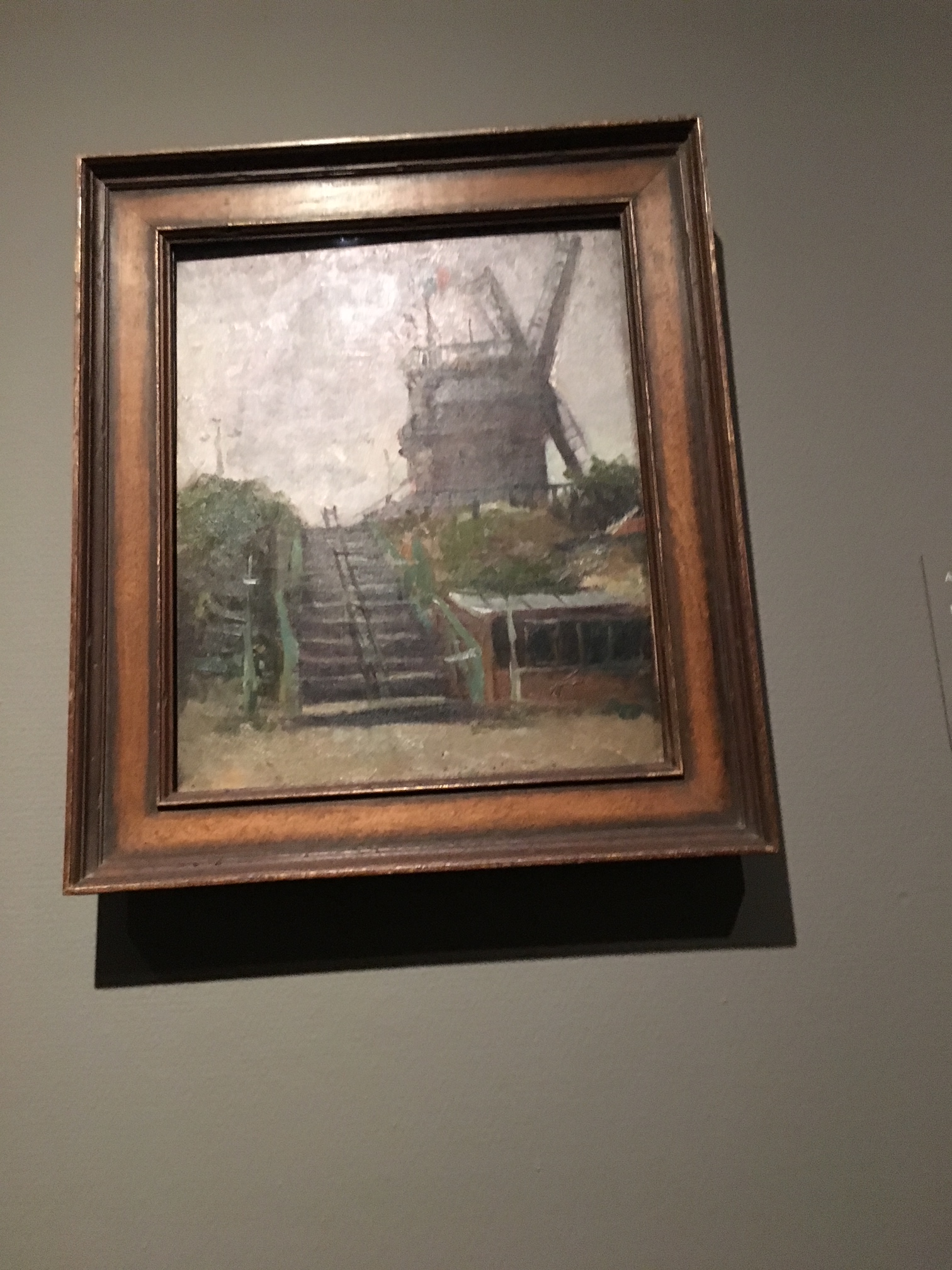
"Stairs in Montmartre" by Arnold Koning

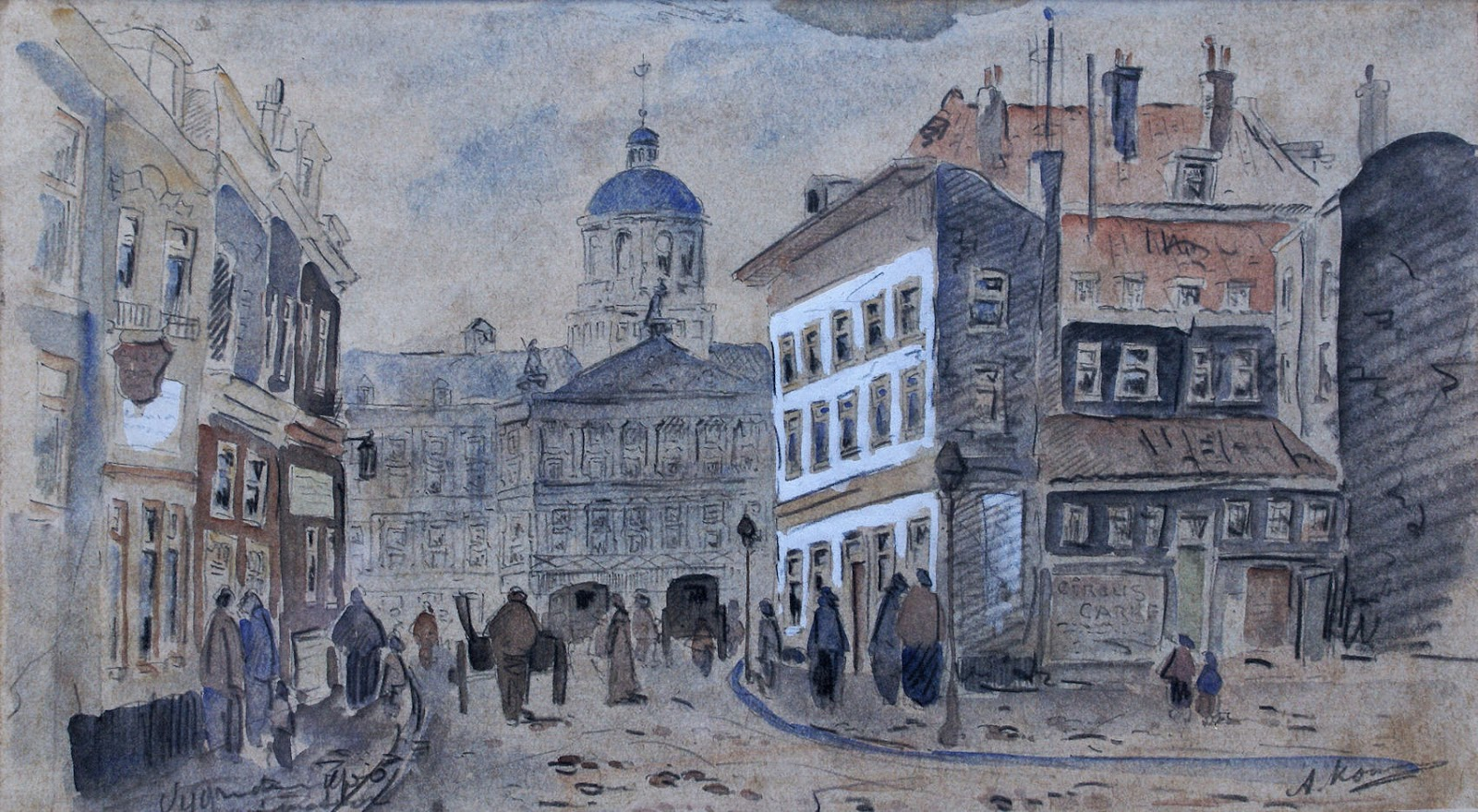
Watercolor of Palace on DAM in Amsterdam by Arnold Koning (1860-1945)
