= Floris Verster =

Dutch painter (1861–1927)

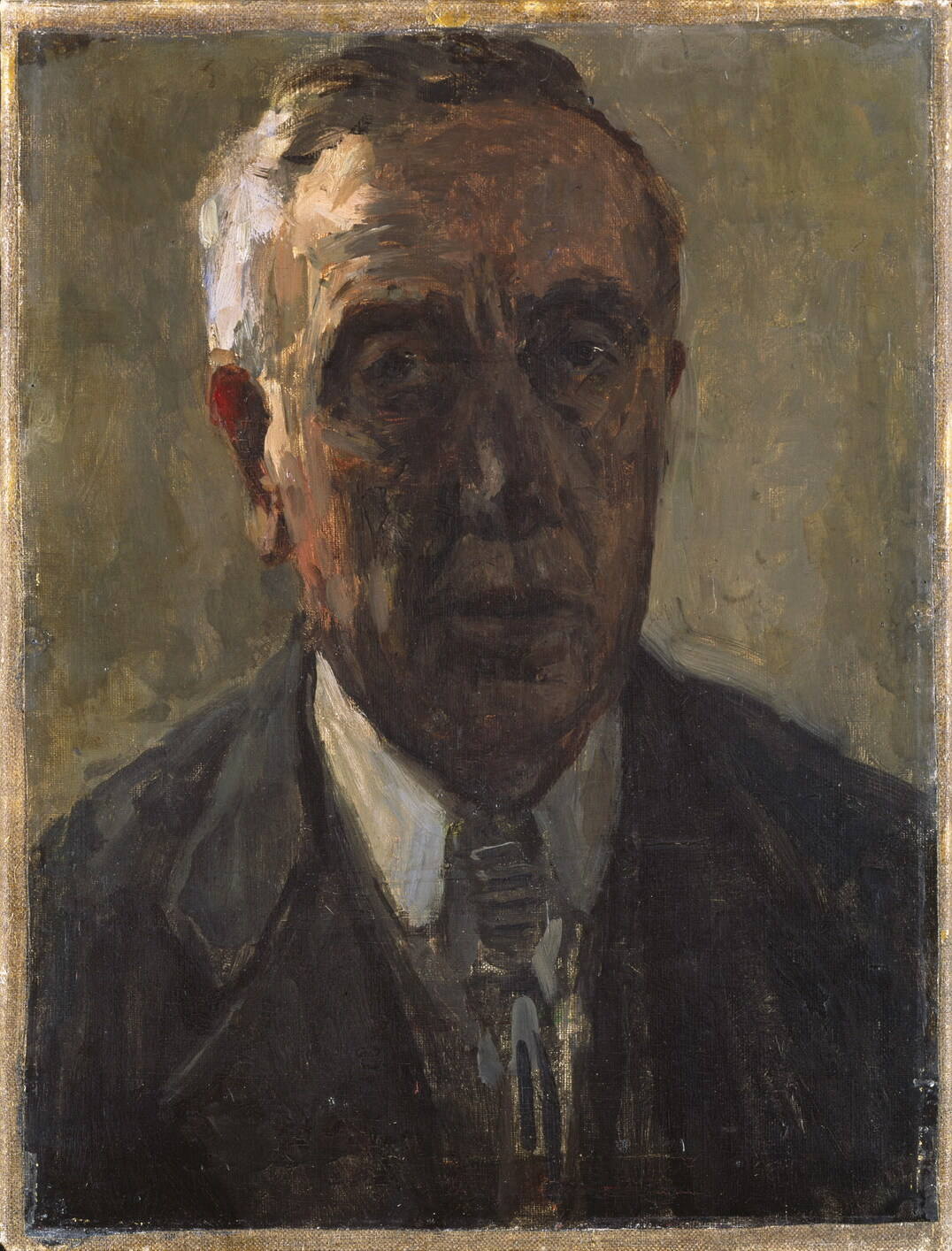
- Self-portrait (1921)
- Born: 9 June 1861; Leiden, The Netherlands
- Died: 21 January 1927 (aged 65); Leiden, The Netherlands
- Known for: Painting

Floris Hendrik Verster (9 June 1861 – 21 January 1927) was a Dutch painter.

== Life ==
Verster came from an artistic family. His father, Abraham Florentius Verster van Wulverhorst, was an administrator of the National Museum of Natural History in Leiden and a renowned scholar and painter of birds. His younger brother Cees developed into an art critic and later a curator of the Stedelijk Museum De Lakenhal in Leiden. Hendrik took drawing lessons from Gerardus Johannes Bos and, in the winter of 1878–79, from George Hendrik Breitner when he briefly worked as a lecturer in Leiden. Between 1880 and 1884, Verster continued his training at the Royal Academy of Art in The Hague, where he counted among his fellow students George Hendrik Breitner, Isaac Israëls and Willem de Zwart. After graduation, he briefly attended classes at Amedee Bourson in Brussels.

From 1882 until 1892, he shared a studio in Leiden with his future brother-in-law, the still-life painter Menso Kamerlingh Onnes (he married Jenny Kamerlingh Onnes in 1892). Until about 1885, he worked in the style of the Hague School. The next seven years, he experimented in still life painting under the influence of his brother-in-law and of French painters Antoine Vollon and Théodule Ribot. As a colourist, he excelled, his passionate colour vision differing from the current Hague School style.

In Brussels, he met Jan Toorop and other members of the avant-garde artists' group Les Vingt. Partly under their influence, Verster began working with rough brush strokes and intense colours. He gained success with his large and exuberant works of floral still lifes and landscapes. In 1891, he took part in the salon of Les XX in Brussels.

Between 1892 and 1900, his work underwent a metamorphosis as it became almost entirely devoted to drawings in crayons with serene subjects. From 1900 onwards, he began to paint and established himself as a celebrated artist in the Netherlands. Major collections of his works are in the Kröller-Müller Museum and the Stedelijk Museum De Lakenhal in Leiden.

On 21 January 1927, he was found dead in a pond. What happened has never been ascertained.

== Selected paintings ==
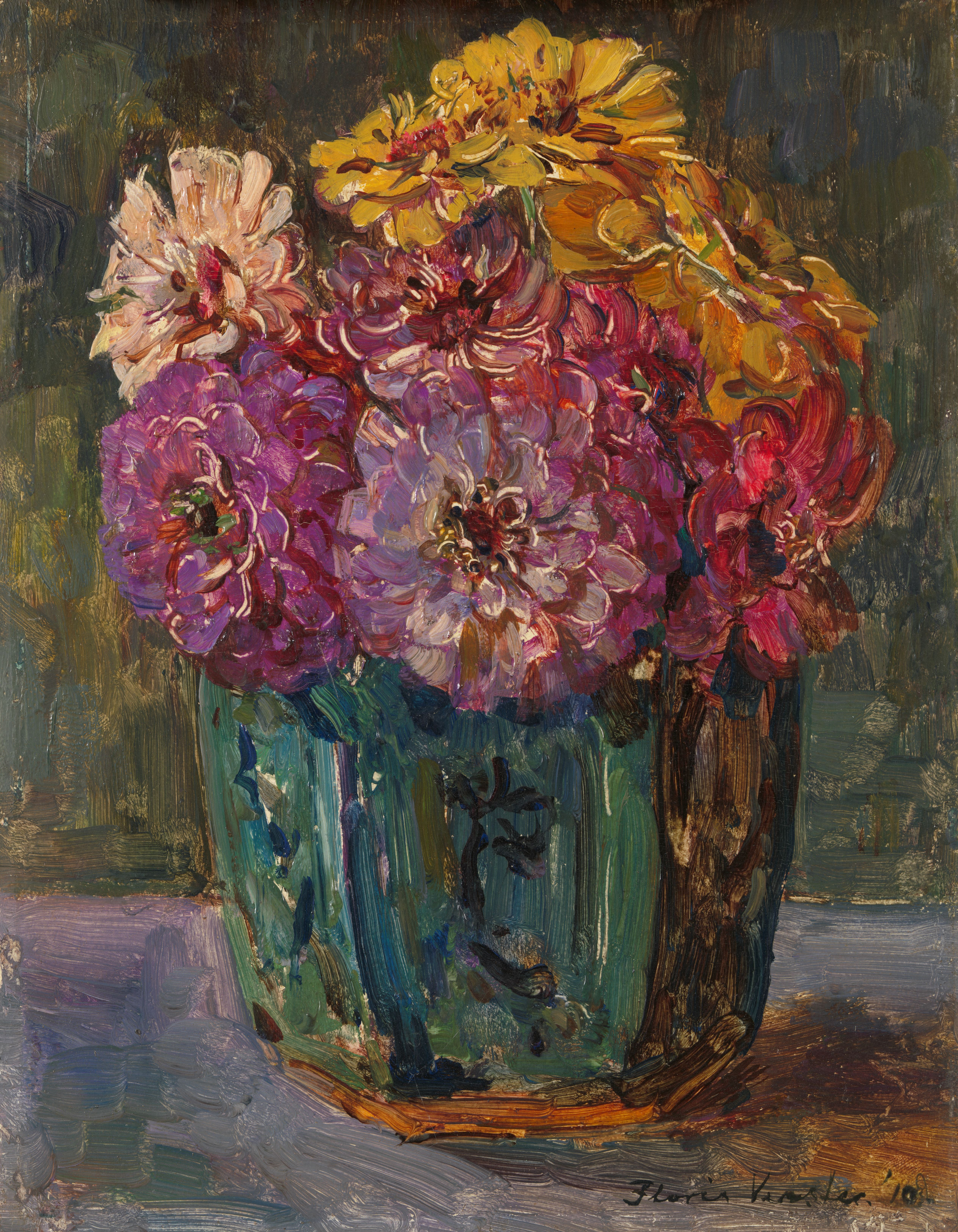
Still Life with Zinnias in a Ginger Pot

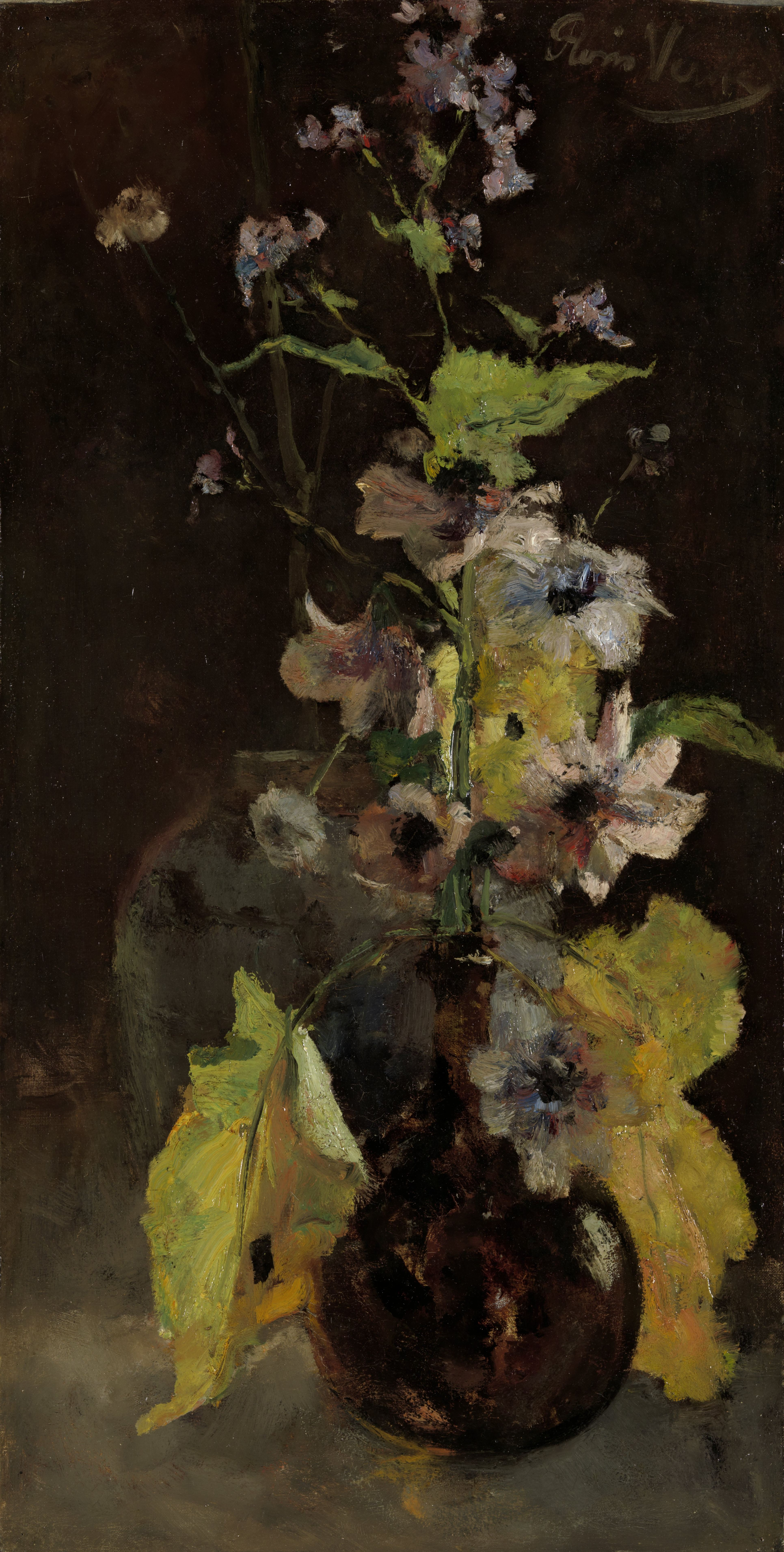
Anemones

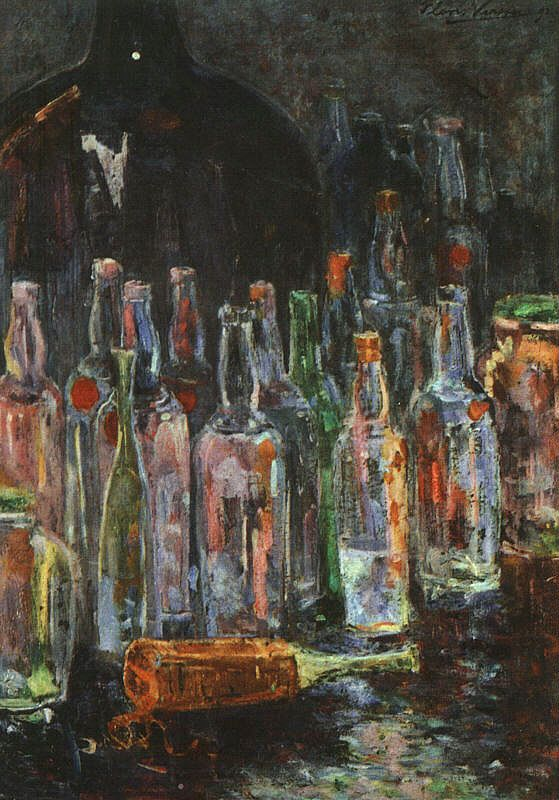
Still Life with Bottles

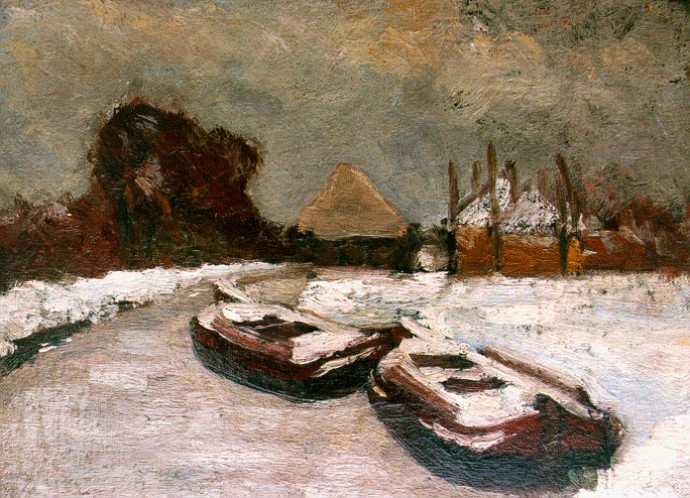
Winter Scene

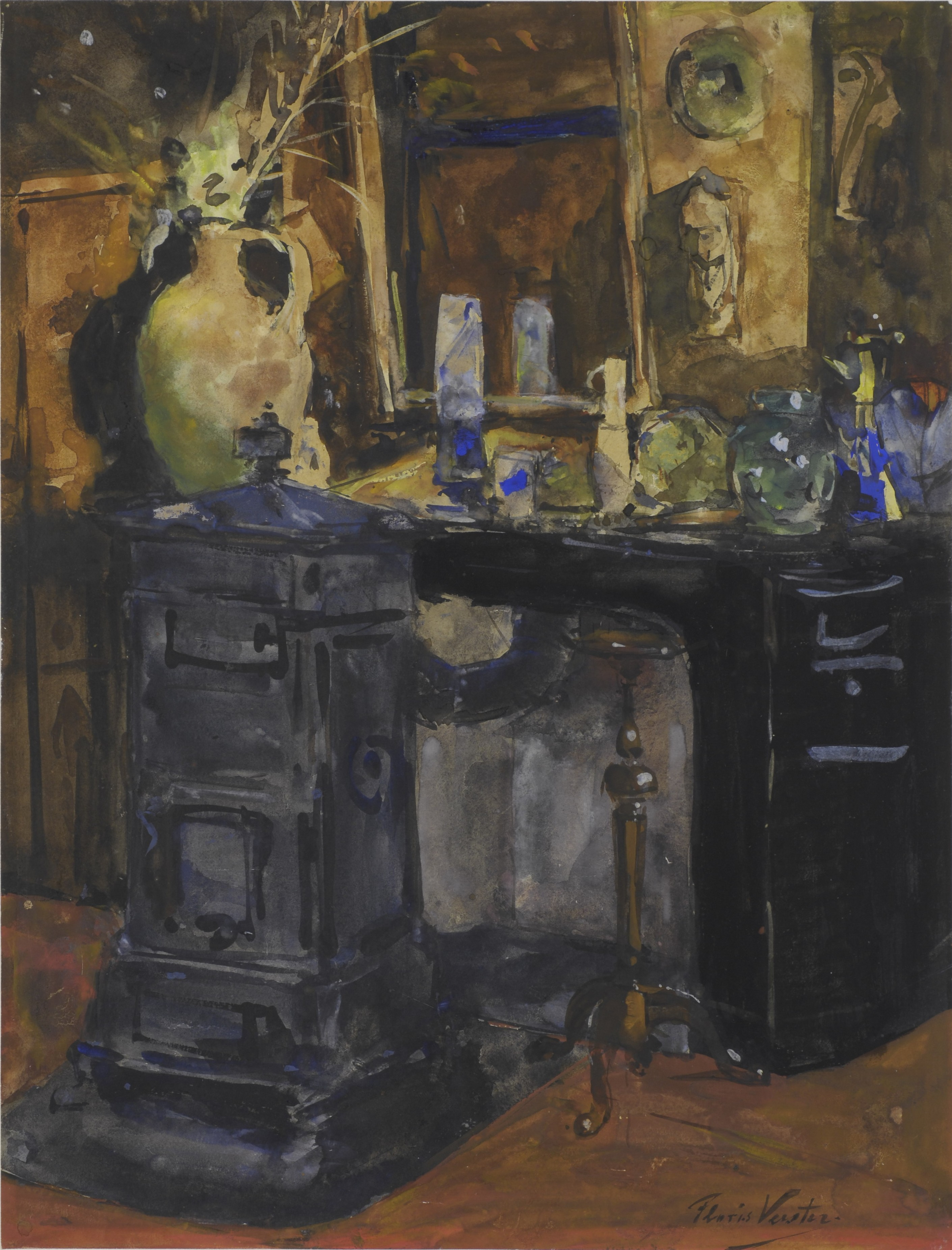
A View of His Studio
