= Philip Zilcken =

Dutch painter (1857–1930)

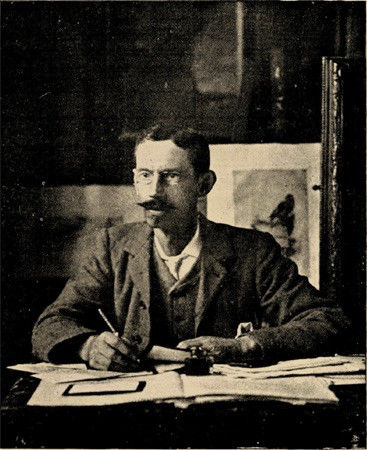
Philip Zilcken in his studio

Charles Louis Philippe Zilcken, generally known as Philip (20 April 1857 – 3 October 1930), was a Dutch painter, etcher, and writer.

== Life and work ==
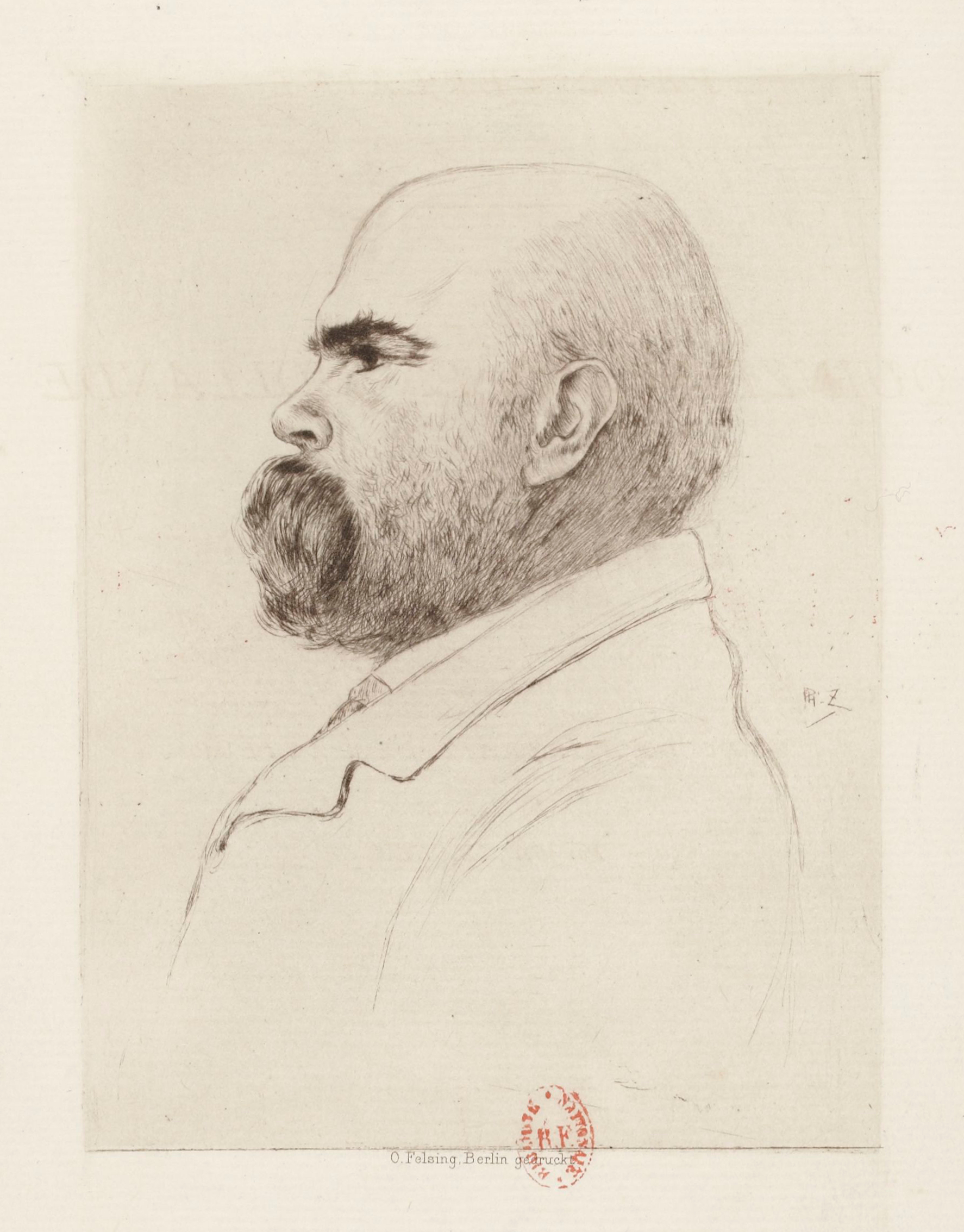
Portrait of Paul Verlaine

He was born in The Hague. After graduating from the Gymnasium Haganum, he took lessons at the Drawing Academy (now the Royal Academy of Art) with Karel Klinkenberg and Anton Mauve. At the age of sixteen, he was offered the position of "secrétaire intime officieux' to Princess Sophie of the Netherlands. In 1875, while in her service, he began experimenting with etching and lithography, and would produce over 700 pieces by 1918.

Later, as an avid Francophile, he made numerous study trips to France, where he created sketches for his works. He was one of the co-founders of the Nederlandsche Etsclub in 1885, inspired by the French Société des aquafortistes.

In 1892, he and his friend Jan Toorop welcomed the poet Paul Verlaine to The Hague. Zilcken made several portraits of him. The following year, he made his first trip to North Africa, visiting Algeria, and produced a series of Orientalist paintings. He also produced a travel book, Three Months in Algiers, with an introduction by Lodewijk van Deyssel, who would later become a popular author. He made an extended stay in Paris in 1895.

From 1896 to 1905, he worked as an art editor for Elsevier's Geïllustreerd Maandschrift, a literary and cultural journal. In addition to the Dutch artists' organizations, Arti et Amicitiae, the Haagse Kunstkring and the Pulchri Studio, he was a member of the French Société des Peintres Orientalistes. In 1914, he made another trip to North Africa, visiting Egypt, where he painted watercolors and made an attempt to create a museum of Orientalist art. His efforts were thwarted by the beginning of World War I, and never resumed. In 1920, he published another travel book, In and Around Cairo.

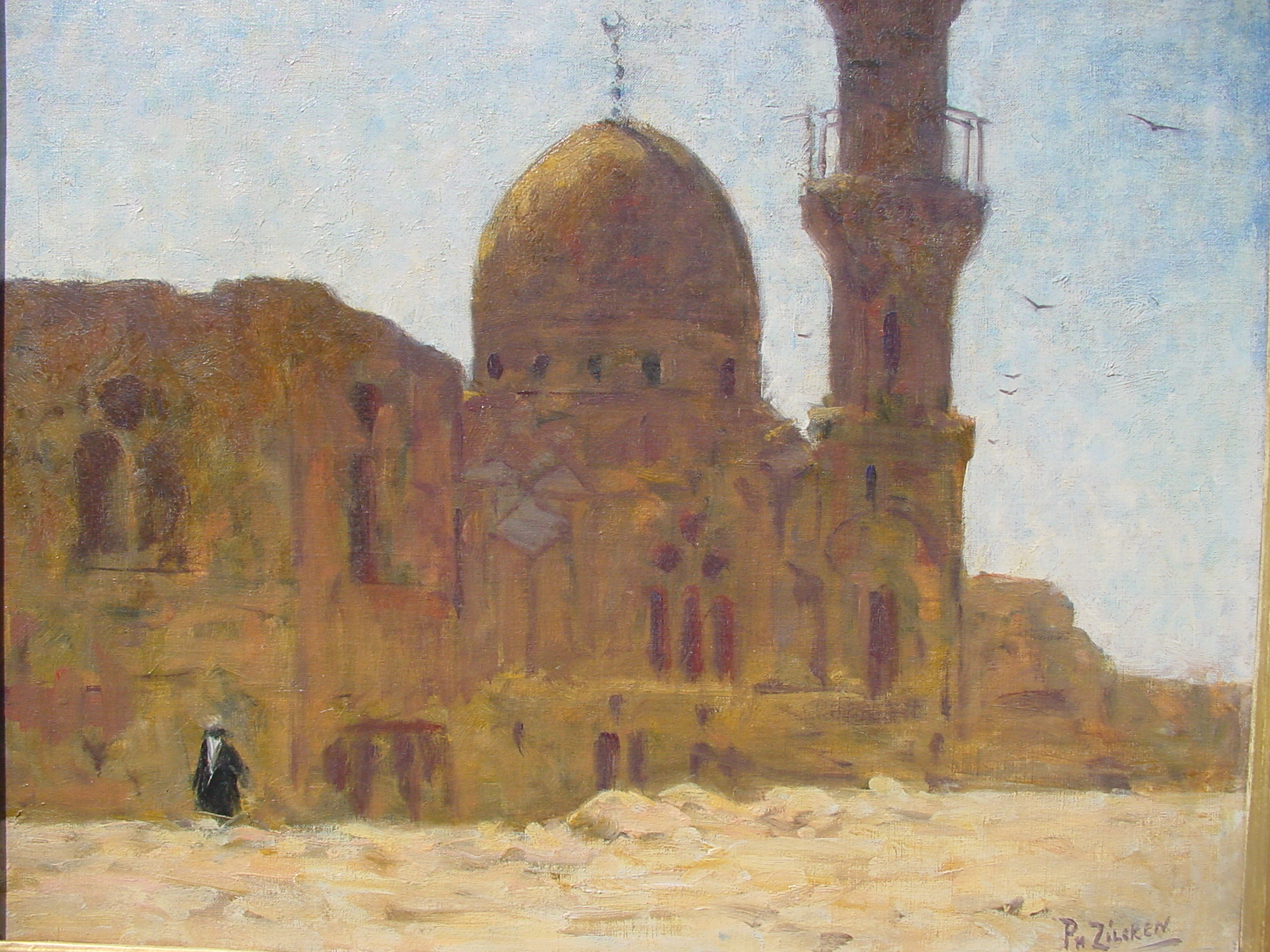
Ruins of the Blue Mosque, Cairo

In 1928, he wrote Memories of a Dutch Painter of the Nineteenth Century, recalling highlights of his life, such as his Orientalist period and his acquaintance with Edmond de Goncourt, who mentions him in his diaries. Shortly after, he retired to the French Riviera. He died in 1930 in Villefranche-sur-Mer, aged seventy-three.

== Sources ==
- P. A. Scheen: Lexicon Nederlandse Beeldende Kunstenaars 1750-1950, P. A. Scheen, 1969, The Hague
- Claude Judrin: "Zilcken" in Rodin et la Hollande, Musée Rodin, Paris, 1996 ISBN 978-2-901428-47-3
- Jaap Versteegh: "De invloed van de Nederlandsche Etsclub" in Rondom Tachtig, Pygmalion, Maarssen 2011 ISBN 978-90-809694-2-1
- Jaap Versteegh: "‘De Hagenaar Philippe Zilcken in de ban van de Oriënt" in Schoonheden met een verhaal, Pygmalion, Maarssen 2005 ISBN 90-809694-1-9
- "Philippe Zilcken", In: Janine Bailly-Herzberg, Dictionnaire de l'estampe en France (1830-1950), Flammarion, 1985, p. 348-349 ISBN 978-2-08-012013-7
