= Theo van Hoytema =

Dutch lithographer, illustrator and graphic designer (1863–1913)

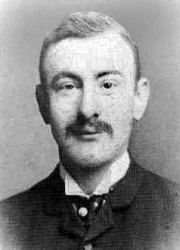
- Born: 18 December 1863; The Hague, Netherlands
- Died: August 28, 1917 (aged 53); The Hague, Netherlands
- Occupations: Lithographer, illustrator, graphic designer

Theodorus van Hoytema, or Hoijtema (18 December 1863 — 28 August 1917) was a Dutch lithographer, illustrator and graphic designer, known for his book covers and calendars; especially those depicting birds.

== Biography ==
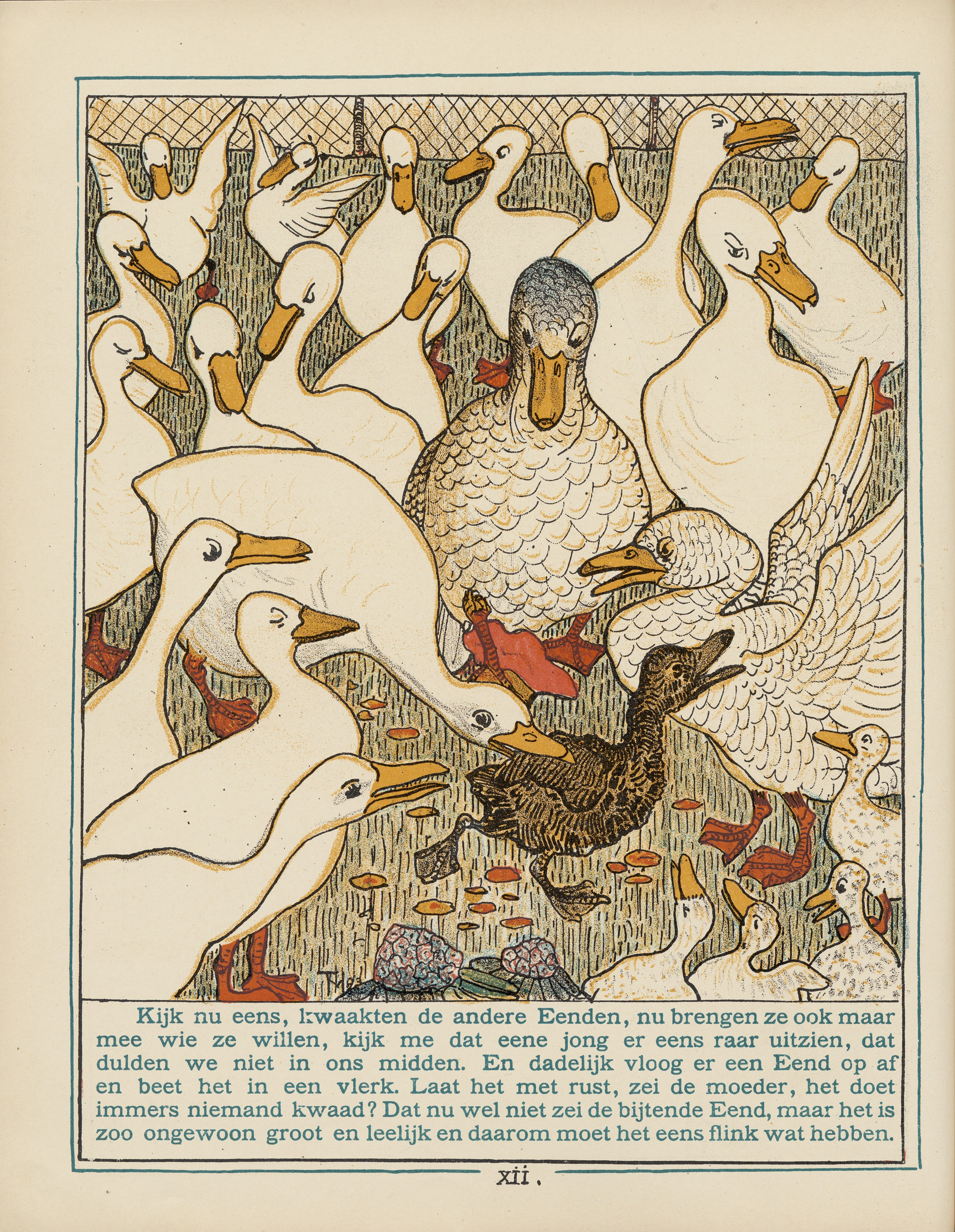
Illustration from The Ugly Duckling

His father was Secretary-General of the Department of Finance. He was the youngest of eight children. Both of his parents died during the 1870s, so he and some siblings moved to Klein Stadwijk, a village in Voorschoten. There, he received his first drawing lessons from his eldest sister. He attended the Stedelijk Gymnasium Leiden and, together with two of his older brothers, passed an exam that enabled them to find work at a financial firm. Theo, however, was not satisfied with office life and decided to become an artist.

He began by taking drawing classes at the Royal Academy of Art. While there, he drew and painted the stuffed animals at the Rijksmuseum van Natuurlijke Historie in Leiden. As a result, his uncle Adriaan van Oordt, Director of Brill Publishers, was able to get him his first commissions doing scientific illustrations. From 1889 to 1890, he became interested in lithography. That same year, he took up temporary residence in a garden house at Binckhorst Castle. The following year, after the success of his first picture book about birds (Hoe de vogels aan een koning kwamen), he was married and moved to Loosduinen. The marriage was, however, short-lived and childless, ending in divorce in 1902.

In 1892, he became a member of the Haagsche Kunstkring and joined Arti et Amicitiae in 1893. That same year, he produced an illustrated edition of The Ugly Duckling by Hans Christian Andersen, followed by several more bird-themed picture books.

He continued to move, restlessly, first to Voorburg then, in 1897, to Hilversum. For a time, he stayed with family members in London. His health became fragile and he was hospitalized for much of 1904 and 1905. He also spent a short time at a psychiatric sanatorium. When released, he went to live with a sister in The Hague and remained there, under her care, for the rest of his life.

Despite his illness, it was during this period that he created the calendars that made him famous. His designs also formed the basis for pottery and furniture. He and his wife were the models for the main characters in Leo en Gerda (1911), a novel by Aegidius Willem Timmerman about the generation of artists who began their careers in the 1880s. A street was named after him in 1923, and a monument was placed there in 2009.

== Selected works ==
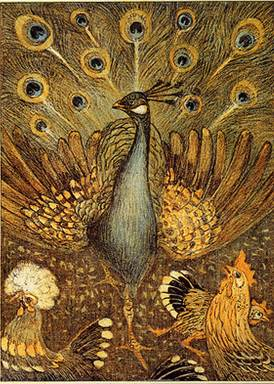
Peacock
(calendar illustration)

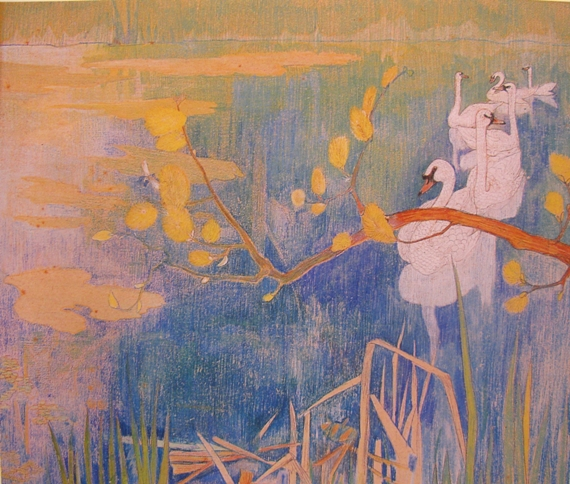
Swans in the River

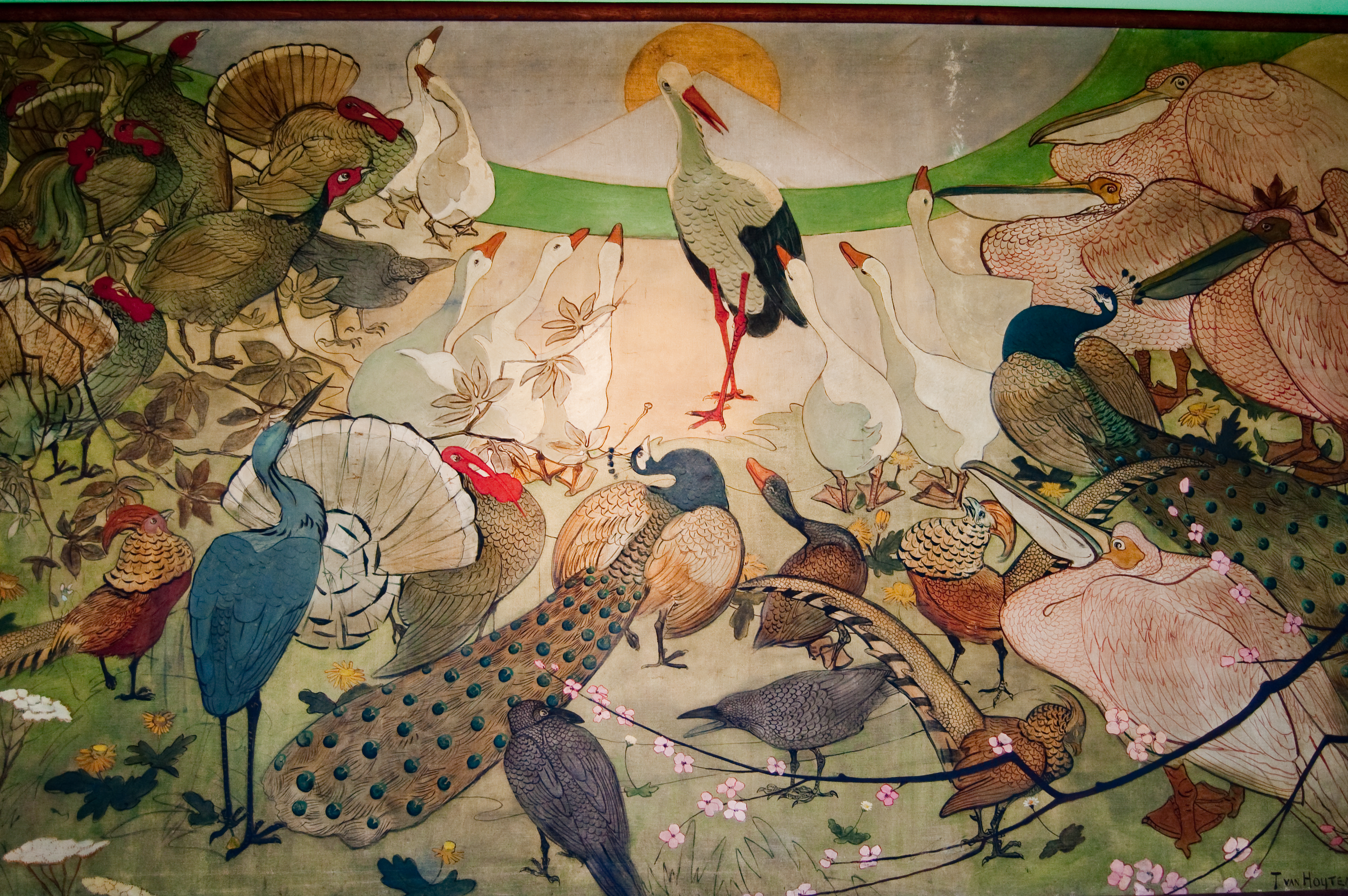
Return of the Stork

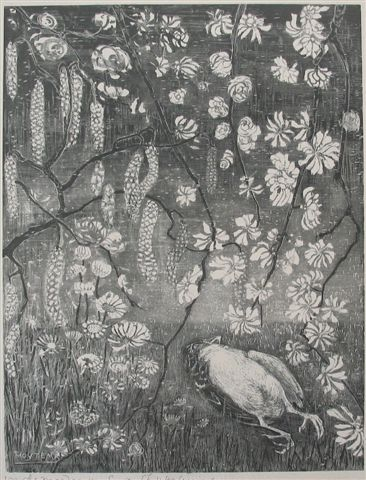
Dead Bird under the Branches
