= Willem de Zwart =

Dutch painter (1862–1931)

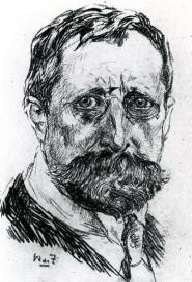
Self-portrait (c. 1910)

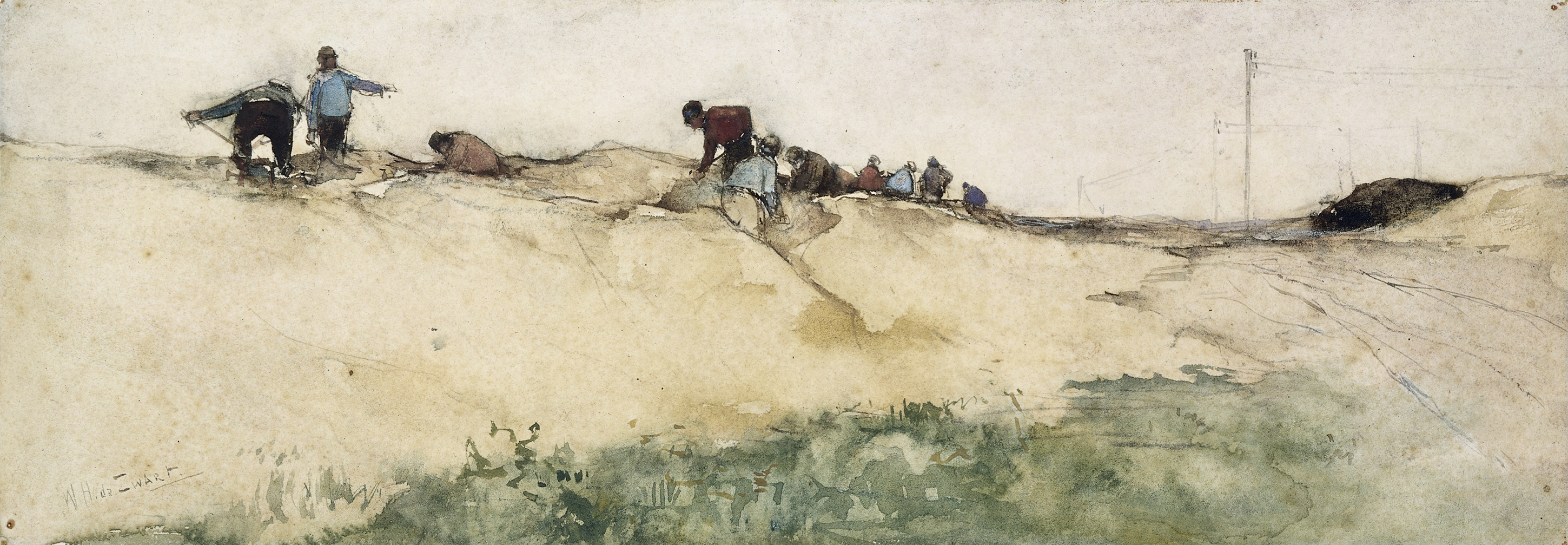
The Sandpit, black chalk and watercolor

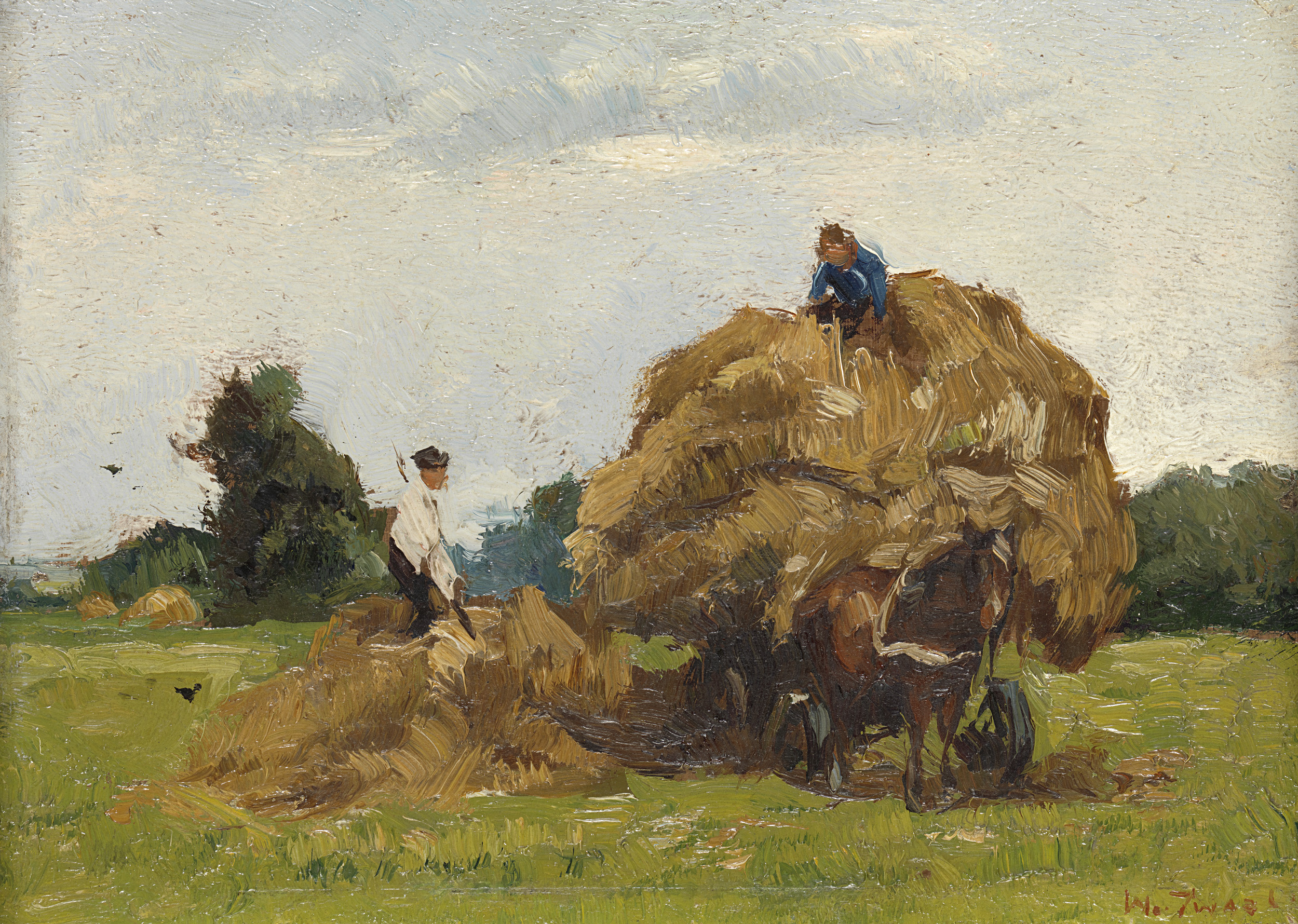
The Haywagon

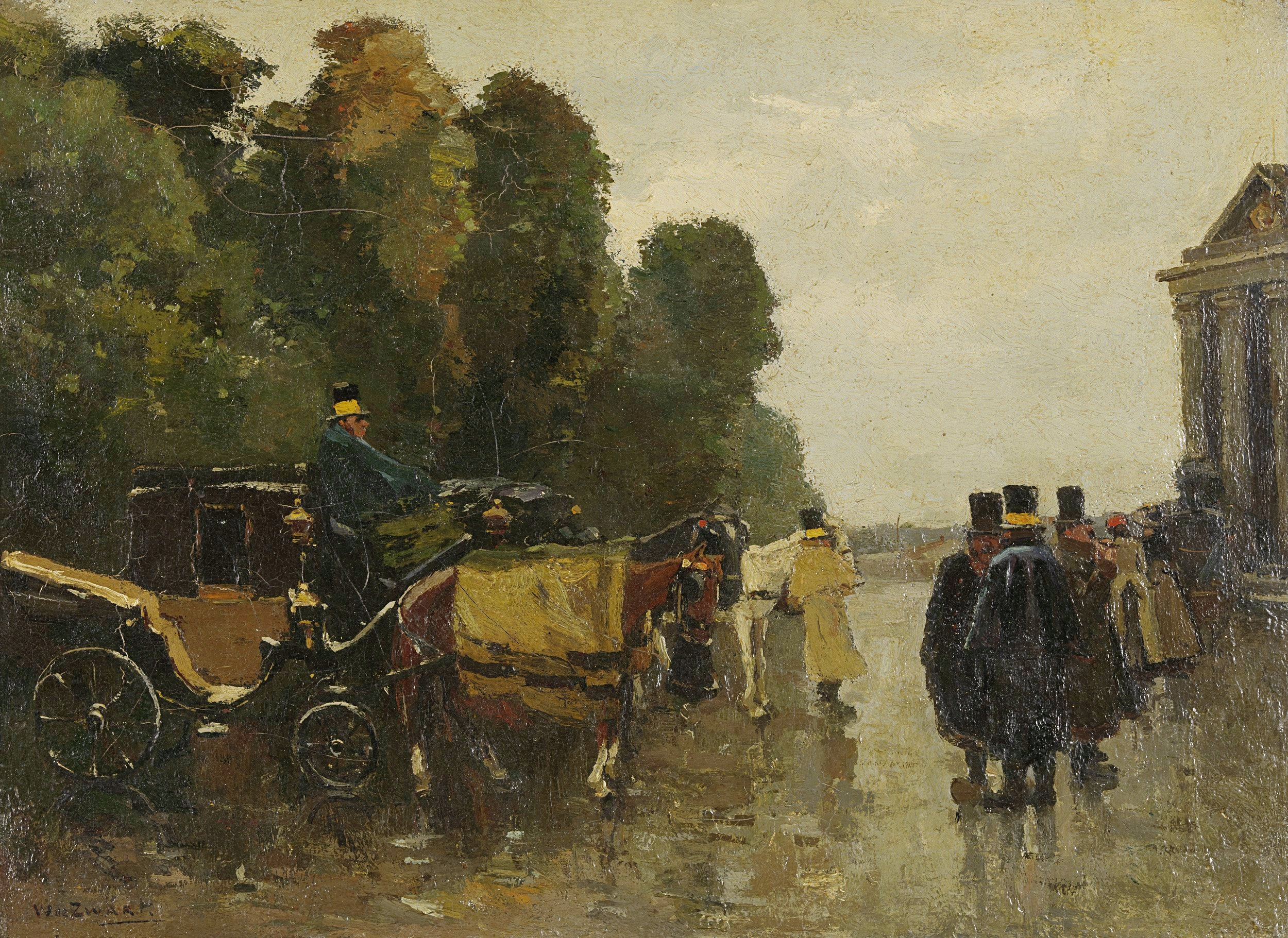
Carriages with Waiting Coachmen

Wilhelmus "Willem" Hendrikus Petrus Johannes de Zwart (16 May 1862 – 11 December 1931) was a Dutch painter, engraver, and watercolorist with many connections to the Hague School and later associated with the Amsterdam Impressionism movement.

== Biography ==
Willem de Zwart was born in The Hague on 16 May 1862, the eldest of eight children. His youngest brother, Pieter, would also become a painter. His father painted carriages for a living, and in 1875 the fourteen-year-old Willem was apprenticed to a carriage maker to learn the same trade. In his spare time, he copied prints he found in magazines, and a year later he enrolled in the evening class at the Royal Academy of Visual Art in The Hague. The following year, he was admitted at the studio of Jacob Maris. In the three years that he remained here, it is probable that he got to know many of the leading lights of the Hague School. Maris also sent De Zwart on a journey to the coast, without drawing materials, and had him work out his impressions directly on canvas when he returned to the studio.

De Zwart made several copies of works by 16th and 17th century masters in the Mauritshuis. He was most interested in the works of Johannes Vermeer, Paulus Potter, and Rembrandt, but studied paintings by German and Italian masters, as well. Sometimes he produced copies on commission. In this period, he also made detailed studies of animals, concentrating particularly on their legs, heads and snouts. De Zwart developed a fastidious painting style with a sober, predominantly brown palette.

Willem de Zwart lived and worked until 1894 in The Hague and from 1900 to 1905 in Amsterdam. His work has a wide range of subjects: landscapes, cityscapes, portraits and still life, rendered in a naturalistic or impressionist style. His work shows affinity with the people and city-oriented Amsterdam Impressionism. In his choice of subjects belonged to the Hague School and in his style and his exuberant use of color to the school of Amsterdam Impressionism. He is also known as the "Hague Breitner" because of the similarity of his work to that of George Hendrik Breitner. He painted his landscapes, figure paintings and still lifes with smooth, bold brushstrokes. De Zwart applied the paint thickly, sometimes straight from the tube, with bright colors, exuberant reds, yellows and blues, giving his paintings special vibrancy.

== Sources ==
- Sillevis, John and Tabak, Anne, The Hague School Book, Waanders Uitgegevers, Zwolle, 2004 (pp. 391–397)
- Marius, Gerharda Hermina, Dutch Painters of the 19th Century, The Antique Collectors' Club, Woodbridge, Suffolk (pp. 218–219)

== See also ==
- Johannes Evert Hendrik Akkeringa
