= Haagse Kunstkring =

Artist group located in The Hague, Netherlands

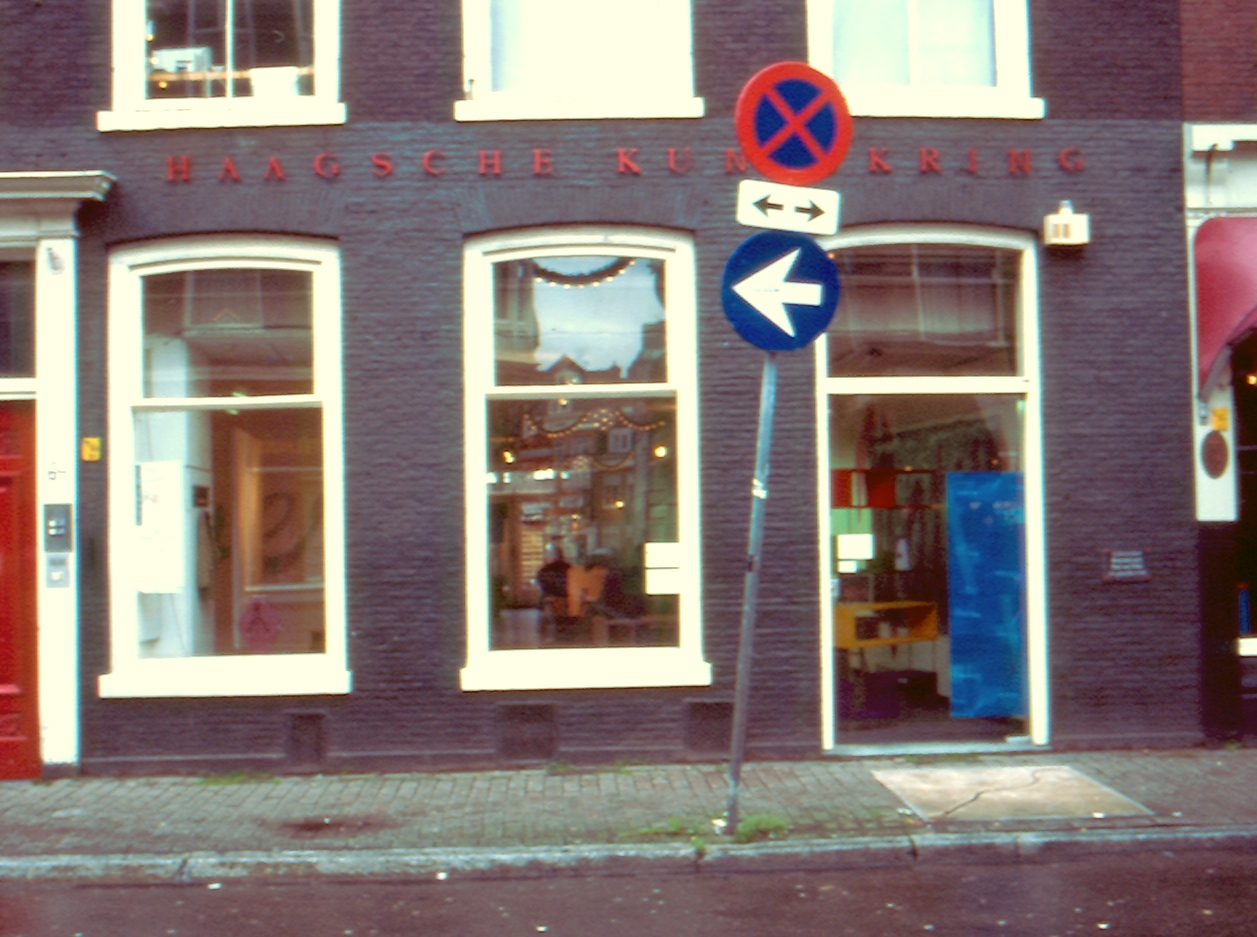
Haagse Kunstkring, winter 1994

The Haagse Kunstkring (English The Hague Art Circle) is an association in The Hague for artists and art lovers. Among the members are visual artists, architects, writers, recitation artists, photographers, musicians and designers.

The association was founded in 1891, among others, by artist Théophile de Bock and architect Paul du Rieu. The art society settled on the Heerengracht in The Hague and later moved to the Denneweg.

In 1892, Jan Toorop organized the first retrospective exhibition of Vincent van Gogh, although at that time this work was still unknown and most controversial.

In 1923, Kurt Schwitters and Theo van Doesburg in the Kunstkring held the first Dada-meeting in the Netherlands, which was of great influence on the renewal of art in the Netherlands.

From 1926 to 1932 the artist Albert Vogel Sr. (1874-1933) served as chairman of the art circle.

To mark the 100th anniversary of the Hague Art Circle, the society was awarded the Medal of the City of The Hague.

== Famous members ==
- Cor Alons, industrial designer
- Hendrik Petrus Berlage, architect
- Leonora van Bijsterveld; her inheritance (1957) allows the Kunstkring could buy a building at the Denneweg. The Art Society is still there.
- Theo van Doesburg, painter
- Pierre H. Dubois, writer
- Hella Haasse, writer
- Theo van Hoytema, illustrator
- Vilmos Huszár, painter, designer
- Herman van der Kloot Meijburg, architect
- Arnold Hendrik Koning, painter
- Max Koot, photographer
- Han van Meegeren, painter and forger
- Martinus Nijhoff, poet
- Johan D. Scherft, etcher and gallerist
- Jan Wils, architect
- Hendrik Wouda, architect and furniture designer
- Piet Zwart, typographer

== See also ==
- Pulchri Studio
