= Bremen (disambiguation) =

Bremen is a city in northwestern Germany.

Bremen may also refer to:

== Places ==
=== Germany ===
- Bremen (state), a federal state in Germany
- Prince-Archbishopric of Bremen, a historical state
- Bremen, Geisa, Wartburgkreis, Thuringia, Germany

=== United States ===
- Bremen, Alabama
- Bremen, Georgia
- Bremen, Jo Daviess County, Illinois
- Bremen, Randolph County, Illinois
- Bremen Precinct, Randolph County, Illinois
- Bremen, Indiana
- Bremen, Kansas
- Bremen, Kentucky
- Bremen, Maine
- Bremen, North Dakota
- Bremen, Ohio

=== Elsewhere ===
- Bremen Island, Antarctica
- Bremen, Saskatchewan, Canada
- Bremen Soviet Republic, a short-lived, unrecognized state in 1919

== Arts and entertainment ==
- Bremen (album), by Kenshi Yonezu, 2015
- Bremen, a manga series by Haruto Umezawa
- Bremen (Shannara), a fictional character
- Town Musicians of Bremen, a Brothers Grimm fairy tale

== People ==
- Adam of Bremen, 11th century German medieval chronicler
- Barry Bremen (1947–2011), known as The Great Imposter
- Wiel Bremen (1925–2014), Dutch politician
- Wilhelmina von Bremen (1909–1976), American sprinter

== Transportation and military ==
=== German Navy ships ===
- Bremen-class cruiser
  - SMS Bremen, launched 1903
- Bremen-class frigate
  - German frigate Bremen,
- Bremen (German submarine), a World War I merchant submarine
- German trawler V 302 Bremen, a World War II vorpostenboot

=== Passenger ships ===
- SS Bremen (1858), an ocean liner of Norddeutscher Lloyd
- SS Bremen (1896), an ocean liner of Norddeutscher Lloyd
- SS Bremen (1922), earlier USS Pocahontas, an ocean liner of Norddeutscher Lloyd
- SS Bremen (1928), an ocean liner of Norddeutscher Lloyd
- SS Bremen (1957), formerly SS Pasteur, an ocean liner
- MS Bremen, a cruise ship of Hapag-Lloyd

=== Aviation ===
- Bremen Airport, the international airport of Bremen, Germany
- Bremen (aircraft), the first airplane to cross the Atlantic from east to west
- Air Bremen, a small German airline 1988–1990

== Other uses ==
- University of Bremen, in Bremen, Germany
- Bremen High School (disambiguation), several uses
- SV Werder Bremen, a German sports club
- Bremen Cup, an annual German football cup competition
- Bremen Teater (Copenhagen), Denmark, a venue

== See also ==
- Breman (disambiguation)
- Bremen I and Bremen II – Bremerhaven, electoral constituencies in the Bundestag
- Duchy of Bremen, a historical state, later Bremen-Verden
- New Bremen, New York
- New Bremen, Ohio
