= Breman =

Breman may refer to:

== Places ==
- Bremen (state) - state of Germany
- Several locations in Asikuma/Odoben/Brakwa District, Central Region, Ghana
- Bremen, Kentucky, originally known as Breman

== People ==
- Anna Breman (born 1976), Swedish banker and economist
- Co Breman (1865–1938), Dutch painter
- Evert Breman (1859–1926), Dutch architect
- Jan Breman (born 1936), Dutch sociologist
- Joel Breman (1936–2024), American epidemiologist
- Paul Breman (1931–2008), Dutch writer, bookseller and publisher
- Todd Breman (born 1965), Australian cricketer and Australian rules footballer

== See also ==
- Bremen (disambiguation)
- William Breman Jewish Heritage & Holocaust Museum, in Atlanta, Georgia, U.S.
