= List of shipwrecks in July 1871 =

The list of shipwrecks in July 1871 includes ships sunk, foundered, grounded, or otherwise lost during July 1871.

== 1 July ==
List of shipwrecks: 1 July 1871
Ship	State	Description
Alkmaar	Netherlands	The ship was driven ashore at Cape São Roque, Brazil. She was on a voyage from Pensacola, Florida, United States to Montevideo, Uruguay.
HMS Agincourt	Royal Navy	HMS Hercules (left) towing HMS Agincourt off the Pearl Rock. The Minotaur-class ironclad ran aground on the Pearl Rock, off Gibraltar. She was refloated on 4 July with assistance from HMS Hercules (Royal Navy).
Alexandra	Germany	The steamship ran aground on the Longsand, in the North Sea off the coast of Essex, United Kingdom. She was on a voyage from Stettin to Le Havre, Seine-Inférieure, France. She was refloated the next day and assisted in to Harwich, Essex.
Alkmaar	Netherlands	The ship was wrecked at Cape St. Rocque, Brazil. She was on a voyage from Pensacola, Florida, United States to Pernambuco, Brazil.
Assyrian	United Kingdom	The ship ran aground on the Otong Bank. She was on a voyage from Iloilo, Spanish East Indies to the English Channel. She was refloated on 4 July and resumed her voyage.
Bivouac	United Kingdom	The steamship was driven ashore at Barber's Point, in the Dardanelles. She was on a voyage from Leith, Lothian to Constantinople, Ottoman Empire. She was refloated on 4 July.
Commoundouros	United Kingdom	The steamship ran aground north of the Kronborg Castle, Denmark. She was on a voyage from South Shields, County Durham to Kronstadt, Russia.
Cynthia	United Kingdom	The brigantine was wrecked at Peniche, Portugal. Her crew were rescued. She was on a voyage from Lisbon, Portugal to Montrose, Forfarshire.
Daphne	(United Kingdom of Great Britain and Ireland)	The schooner ran aground on the Pennington Spit, off the coast of Hampshire. She was refloated with assistance from the smack Plover (United Kingdom).
Dunsandle	United Kingdom	The ship was driven ashore at "Sando". She was on a voyage from Gävle, Sweden to Berwick upon Tweed, Northumberland. She had been refloated by 6 July and towed in to Stockholm, Sweden in a leaky condition.

== 2 July ==
List of shipwrecks: 2 July 1871
Ship	State	Description
Emily Hard	United Kingdom	The ship was driven ashore on the Berdyansk Spit, Russia.
Hotspur	United Kingdom	The ship ran aground and was damaged at Galle, Ceylon. She was on a voyage from Newcastle upon Tyne, Northumberland to Galle. She was refloated.
Mary Shepherd	United Kingdom	The ship caught fire in Hobsons Bay and was scuttled. She was later refloated and repaired.
Prussia	United Kingdom	The steamship ran aground near "Rubtrg", Denmark. She was refloated and taken in to Hjørring, Denmark.

== 3 July ==
List of shipwrecks: 3 July 1871
Ship	State	Description
Carham	United Kingdom	The paddle steamer collided with another vessel and then struck the quayside at Gairloch, Ross-shire. She consequently sank the next day. She was refloated and taken to Stornoway, Isle of Lewis, Outer Hebrides for repairs.
David Dunn	United Kingdom	The steamship collided with the steamship Earl Percy (United Kingdom) and sank at South Shields, County Durham. She was refloated.
Paquebot de Brest	France	The ship was driven ashore near Brest, Finistère. She was on a voyage from Brest to Swansea, Glamorgan, United Kingdom. She was refloated and taken in to Brest, where she was condemned.

== 4 July ==
List of shipwrecks: 4 July 1871
Ship	State	Description
Shelchoff	United States	The brig was wrecked in a typhoon in the Pacific Ocean. She was on a voyage from San Francisco, California to Callao, Peru. Only one of the twelve people on board survived to be rescued on 19 October by the steamship Moses Taylor (United States).

== 5 July ==
List of shipwrecks: 5 July 1871
Ship	State	Description
Tyro	United Kingdom	The brig sank 7 nautical miles (13 km) north east of Cromer, Norfolk. Her crew were rescued.

== 6 July ==
List of shipwrecks: 6 July 1871
Ship	State	Description
A. Bilard	United Kingdom	The ship was wrecked in the "Caite Islands", Brazil. Her crew survived. She was on a voyage from Cardiff, Glamorgan to Pará, Brazil.
Chevy Chase	United Kingdom	The steamship ran aground on the Hinder Bank, in the North Sea off the Dutch coast. She was on a voyage from Rotterdam, South Holland, Netherlands to Newcastle upon Tyne, Northumberland. She was refloated and put back to Rotterdam.
Eunomia	Greece	The steamship suffered a boiler explosion and fire with the loss of many lives. She was on a voyage from Piraeus to "Spezzia Island".
Golden Fleece	United States	After arriving at Halifax, Nova Scotia, Canada, with a fire in her forward hold that her crew had discovered on 4 July, the clipper was scuttled at Tobin′s Wharf in Halifax Harbour to extinguish it. After the 20 feet (6.1 m) of water in her hold was pumped out, the fire broke again, but was extinguished again by spraying water into the hold. She was refloated, repaired, and returned to service.
Haco	France	The steamship ran aground on the Salvo Reef, in the Baltic Sea off Fårö, Sweden. She was on a voyage from Kronstadt, Russia to Le Havre, Seine-Inférieure. She was refloated, and towed into Kalmar by the steamship Oresund (Sweden.

== 7 July ==
List of shipwrecks: 7 July 1871
Ship	State	Description
Antoine et Marie	France	The brig ran aground on the Cross Sand, in the North Sea off the coast of Norfolk, United Kingdom. She was refloated.
Augustine	United Kingdom	The steamship ran aground at Queenstown, County Cork. She was on a voyage from Ceará, Brazil to Liverpool, Lancashire. She was refloated.
Chapultepec	Canada	The ship was driven ashore and wrecked near Rhoscolyn, Anglesey, United Kingdom. She was on a voyage from Quebec City to Liverpool, Lancashire, United Kingdom. She was refloated on 29 July and towed in to the River Mersey by the tugs Grappler, Merryandrew and Tartar (all United Kingdom).
Kibon Dalem	Japan	The steamship was driven ashore in a typhoon at Kobe.
Kinsata	Japan	The steamship was driven ashore and wrecked in a typhoon at Kobe.
Oheumaru	Japan	The steamship was driven ashore and wrecked in a typhoon at Kobe.
Pahloong	Japan	The steamship was driven ashore and wrecked in a typhoon at Kobe.
Pride of the Thames	United Kingdom	The ship was wrecked in a typhoon at Hiogo, Japan with the loss of at least five of her crew. Five crew were rescued. She had been refloated by 1 November.
Rising Sun	United Kingdom	The steamship was driven ashore and wrecked in a typhoon at Hiogo.
Sakata Maru	Japan	The steamship was driven ashore in a typhoon at Kobe.
Taku	Japan	The steamship was driven ashore in a typhoon at Kobe.
Two unnamed vessels	Japan	The steamships were driven ashore in a typhoon at Kobe.

== 8 July ==
List of shipwrecks: 8 July 1871
Ship	State	Description
Belle of the South	United Kingdom	The ship ran aground at St. Mary's, Isles of Scilly. She was on a voyage from London to Algoa Bay. She was refloated and taken in to St. Mary's in a waterlogged condition.
Hardware	United Kingdom	The brig capsized at Newport, Monmouthshire. She was righted.
James Manlaws	United Kingdom	The smack was wrecked on The Shingles, off the Isle of Wight. All on board survived.
Surprise	United Kingdom	The ship ran aground at Dragør, Denmark. She was on a voyage from Blyth, Northumberland to Saint Petersburg, Russia.

== 9 July ==
List of shipwrecks: 9 July 1871
Ship	State	Description
Svea	Norway	The barque collided with the barque Winburn (United States) and sank off Calais, France. Svea was on a voyage from Newcastle upon Tyne, Northumberland to Bombay, India. She was refloated and towed in to Dunkirk, Nord, France.

== 10 July ==
List of shipwrecks: 10 July 1871
Ship	State	Description
Italia	United States	The ship was wrecked at Tierra del Fuego, Chile. Her 23 crew were rescued on 19 July by Bogota (United Kingdom). Italia was on a voyage from Rio de Janeiro, Argentina to Callao, Peru.

== 11 July ==
List of shipwrecks: 11 July 1871
Ship	State	Description
Sea Bird	United Kingdom	The pilot skiff was wrecked off Sully Island, Glamorgan. Her crew were rescued.
Madagascar, and Widgeon	United Kingdom	Madagascar collided with the steamship Widgeon 8 nautical miles (15 km) east south east of the Eddystone Lighthouse, Cornwall. Both vessels sank. All 61 crew from both vessels were rescued by the fishing sloop Uncle Sam (United Kingdom). Madagascar was on a voyage from London to Quebec City, Canada. Widgeon was on a voyage from Liverpool, Lancashire to Rotterdam, South Holland, Netherlands.
Tiber	United Kingdom	The steamship ran aground at Montreal, Quebec, Canada. She was on a voyage from Newcastle upon Tyne, Northumberland to Montreal.

== 12 July ==
List of shipwrecks: 12 July 1871
Ship	State	Description
Eburn	United Kingdom	The ship foundered off Brighton, Sussex. Her crew were rescued. She was on a voyage from Poole, Dorset to London.
Glencairn	United Kingdom	The steamship ran aground on the South Pampas, off the Dutch coast. She was on a voyage from Hellevoetsluis, Zeeland, Netherlands to Middlesbrough, Yorkshire.
Warner	United Kingdom	The brigantine foundered in the North Sea 100 nautical miles (190 km) east south east of Heligoland. Her crew were rescued by the smack Beautiful Star. Warner was on a voyage from Hartlepool, County Durham to Hamburg, Germany.
Unnamed	United Kingdom	The barque foundered in Porthwan Bay. Her crew were rescued. She was on a voyage from Liverpool, Lancashire to Valparaíso, Chile.

== 13 July ==
List of shipwrecks: 13 July 1871
Ship	State	Description
Bremen	Germany	The steamship ran aground on the Goodwin Sands, Kent, United Kingdom. She was on a voyage from Bremen to New York, United States. She was refloated the next day and resumed her voyage.
Number Two	Russia	The barque ran aground and sank in the Neva at "Neffskyin".
Moffao	Chile	The ship was driven ashore 6 to 8 nautical miles (11 to 15 km) south of Ancud and was abandoned by her crew. She was refloated with the assistance of a steamship on 18 July and towed in to Ancun.
Rosa	Argentina	The schooner collided with America (United States) and sank in the Paraná River.

== 14 July ==
List of shipwrecks: 14 July 1871
Ship	State	Description
Battonian	Mexico	The schooner was wrecked at Point Palmilla with the loss of all hands. She was on a voyage from Mazatlan, Cuba to San José del Cabo.
Countess of Eglinton	United Kingdom	The steamship was wrecked on the Langness Peninsula, Isle of Man. All on board were rescued. She was on a voyage from Dublin to Douglas, Isle of Man and/or Silloth, Cumberland. Her cargo came ashore and was plundered by the local inhabitants; one man drank himself to death on Guinness looted from the ship.
Desirée	France	The schooner was destroyed by fire at Riga, Russia. She was on a voyage from Bremen, Germany to Riga.
Hillers	United States	The barque was destroyed by fire at Riga.
HMS Racer	Royal Navy	The Racer-class sloop collided with the brig Active (Norway) off Portland, Dorset and was severely damaged.
Star	United Kingdom	The steamship sprang a leak and was beached on Gigha. She was on a voyage from Glasgow, Renfrewshire to Easdale, in the Slate Islands. She was refloated and beached at Campbeltown, Argyllshire.
Westmoreland	United Kingdom	The barque was wrecked off Bolt Head, Devon. Her crew were rescued. She was on a voyage from Jamaica to a British port.
William S. Hiles	United States	The ship was destroyed by fire at Riga, Russia.
27 unnamed vessels	Flags unknown	The barques were destroyed by fire at Riga.

== 15 July ==
List of shipwrecks: 15 July 1871
Ship	State	Description
Concordia	United Kingdom	The ship was wrecked at Flores Island, Azores. Her crew were rescued. She was on a voyage from Saint Lucia to an English port.
Pacific	United Kingdom	The schooner struck the Heriot Rocks, off the coast of Lothian. She was on a voyage from Redbridge, Hampshire to Leith, Lothian. She was taken in to Bo'ness, Lothian in a leaky condition.
Tees	United Kingdom	The steamship .

== 16 July ==
List of shipwrecks: 16 July 1871
Ship	State	Description
Seine	United Kingdom	The steamship struck the Stags Rocks, Cornwall. She was on a voyage from Rouen, Seine-Inférieure, France to Neath, Glamorgan. She put in to Hayle, Cornwall in a leaky condition.
Virgilia	Chile	The ship was driven ashore and wrecked at Puerto Montt.

== 17 July ==
List of shipwrecks: July 1871
Ship	State	Description
Benvoirlich	United Kingdom	The ship ran aground on the Goodwin Sands, Kent. She was on a voyage from Hamburg, Germany to Akyab, Burma. She was refloated and taken in to The Downs.
Leopold	Belgium	The ship ran aground at the South Foreland, Kent, United Kingdom. She was on a voyage from Ostend, West Flanders to Dover, Kent. Her passengers were taken off by the tug Middlesex (United Kingdom). Leopold was refloated and taken in to Dover.
Hoffnung	Germany	The ship was driven ashore at Hela in a waterlogged condition. She was on a voyage from Danzig to Bremen.
Wideawake	United Kingdom	The schooner collided with the schooner Wilhelmine (Germany) and foundered off Falmouth, Cornwall. Her crew were rescued by Wilhelmine. Wideawake was on a voyage from Poole, Dorset to Liverpool, Lancashire.

== 18 July ==
List of shipwrecks: 18 July 1871
Ship	State	Description
Abeona	United Kingdom	The schooner ran aground on the Newcombe Sand, in the North Sea off the coast of Norfolk. She was refloated and taken in to Lowestoft, Suffolk.
Alert	Germany	The schooner was abandoned in the Atlantic Ocean.
Alexander	United Kingdom	The barque was driven ashore at Richibucto, New Brunswick, Canada.
Bucton Castle	United Kingdom	The ship was severely damaged by fire at Dover, Kent. She was on a voyage from South Shields, County Durham to Aden. Bucton Castle was beached at the Shakespeare Cliff. She was a total loss.
Exemplar	United Kingdom	The brigantine was driven ashore at Richibucto.
Little Edith	United Kingdom	The ship was driven ashore and wrecked on Lively Island, Falkland Islands. Her crew were rescued. She was on a voyage from Hamburg, Germany to Callao, Peru.

== 19 July ==
List of shipwrecks: 19 July 1871
Ship	State	Description
Cecile	France	The ship ran aground on the Goodwin Sands, Kent, United Kingdom. She was on a voyage from Sunderland, County Durham, United Kingdom to Nantes, Loire-Inférieure.
Jessie	United Kingdom	The schooner collided with the steamship William Connal (United Kingdom) and sank in the Clyde. Her crew were rescued. Jessie was on a voyage from Thurso, Caithness to Glasgow, Renfrewshire. She was refloated on 15 August and taken in to Bowling, Dunbartonshire.
Juno	Norway	The ship ran aground at Narva, Russia. Her crew were rescued.
Lamplighter	United Kingdom	The schooner was driven ashore on Lindisfarne, Northumberland. She was on a voyage from Kennetpans, Clackmannanshire to Whitstable, Kent. She was refloated and resumed her voyage.
Lotus	United Kingdom	The brig ran aground on the Pennington Spit, off the coast of Hampshire. She was refloated.
Maria Corinna	Argentina	The schooner was wrecked on Juncal Island. Her crew were rescued. She was on a voyage from Gualeguaychú to Buenos Aires.
Pilot	United Kingdom	The steamship ran aground on the Barber Sand, in the North Sea off the coast of Norfolk. She was on a voyage from London to Newcastle upon Tyne, Northumberland. She was refloated.
Susan	United Kingdom	The ship ran aground on the Goodwin Sands. She was on a voyage from Dover, Kent to King's Lynn, Norfolk.
Sweden	United Kingdom	The steamship struck a rock and was run ashore at "Elfsborg", Sweden. She was on a voyage from Hartlepool, County Durham to Gothenburg. She was refloated and resumed her voyage in a leaky condition.
Unnamed	United Kingdom	The schooner ran aground on the Goodwin Sands. She was refloated and resumed her voyage.
Three unnamed vessels	Flags unknown	Two schooners and a sloop ran aground on the Goodwin Sands.

== 20 July ==
List of shipwrecks: 20 July 1871
Ship	State	Description
Catherine	United Kingdom	The ship ran aground on the Caloot Bank, in the North Sea. She was on a voyage from Maldon, Essex to Antwerp, Belgium. She was refloated with assistance on 22 July and resumed her voyage.
Limena	United Kingdom	The ship departed from Sombrero, Anguilla for Aberdeen. No further trace, presumed foundered with the loss of all hands.
Seabird	United Kingdom	The sloop collided with the steamship Amanda (United Kingdom) and sank off the Saltee Islands, County Wexford. Her crew were rescued.
Waterman	Flag unknown	The 113-ton brigantine foundered while moored offshore in a storm off Hokitika, New Zealand. There were no deaths.

== 21 July ==
List of shipwrecks: 21 July 1871
Ship	State	Description
Anna	Germany	The ship was driven ashore at Stolpemünde. Her crew were rescued. She was on a voyage from Danzig to Copenhagen, Denmark.
Rose and Elizabeth	United Kingdom	The fishing lugger struck a sunken wreck and sank in the North Sea 5 nautical miles (9.3 km) north west by north of the Dudgeon Lightship ( Trinity House). Her crew were rescued by Kate (United Kingdom).
Washington	United States	The ship ran aground at Birkenhead, Cheshire, United Kingdom. She was on a voyage from New York to Birkenhead. She was refloated.
Whim	(United Kingdom of Great Britain and Ireland) Jersey	The fishing smack was driven ashore and wrecked at Shoreham-by-Sea, Sussex.

== 22 July ==
List of shipwrecks: 22 July 1871
Ship	State	Description
Emily	United Kingdom	The smack capsized and sank in the River Ribble.
Lightning	United Kingdom	The ship was driven ashore on "China Buckneer", near Rangoon, Burma. She was on a voyage from Rangoon to Calcutta, India.

== 23 July ==
List of shipwrecks: 23 July 1871
Ship	State	Description
Chatham	United Kingdom	The ship ran aground in the Uruguay River.
Eliza	Germany	The schooner was wrecked 20 nautical miles (37 km) north of "Mustardo" with the loss of a crew member. She was on a voyage from Penguin Island, Patagonia, Argentina to Liverpool, Lancashire, United Kingdom.
Wherrow	United Kingdom	The barque ran aground in the Uruguay River.

== 24 July ==
List of shipwrecks: 24 July 1871
Ship	State	Description
Floreta	United Kingdom	The ship was towed in to Beaumaris, Anglesey in a sinking condition. She was on a voyage from Liverpool, Lancashire to Puerto Rico.
Jenny	United Kingdom	The ship was destroyed by fire at New York, United States. She was on a voyage from New York to Hull, Yorkshire.
Lord Lyons	United Kingdom	The ship was driven ashore at Matane, Quebec, Canada. She was on a voyage from Quebec City to London. She was later refloated.
Madras	United Kingdom	The ship ran aground at Dodanduwa, Ceylon. She was on a voyage from Port Glasgow, Renfrewshire to Bombay, India. She was refloated and resumed her voyage.
Topaz	United Kingdom	The ship was driven ashore at Great Yarmouth, Norfolk. She was on a voyage from Liverpool to Great Yarmouth. She was refloated and taken in to Great Yarmouth in a leaky condition.

== 25 July ==
List of shipwrecks: 25 July 1871
Ship	State	Description
Anna Camp	United States	The ship was driven ashore at Le Havre, Seine-Inférieure, France. She was on a voyage from New Orleans, Louisiana, to Le Havre. She was refloated.
Artemisia	United Kingdom	The barque ran aground on a reef off "Montia Island", in the Indian Ocean and sank. Her crew survived. She was on a voyage from Kurrachee, India to Zanzibar.
St. Peter and St. Paul	Russian Empire	The lighter sank in the Don.
Unnamed	Flag unknown	The derelict ship was driven ashore at "Kraxtepellen", Germany.

== 26 July ==
List of shipwrecks: 26 July 1871
Ship	State	Description
George H. Jenkins	United Kingdom	The barque ran aground on the Carlingford Bank, in the Carlingford Lough. She was refloated with assistance.
Isaac	United States	The schooner capsized 20 nautical miles (37 km) south south east of Barnegat, New Jersey.
Rock	United Kingdom	The schooner was driven ashore and wrecked at Ballantrae, Ayrshire. Her crew were rescued. She was on a voyage from Ayr to Donaghadee, County Down.

== 27 July ==
List of shipwrecks: 27 July 1871
Ship	State	Description
B 1117	France	The lugger was driven ashore and damaged at Aberdeen, United Kingdom.
Loudoun Castle	United Kingdom	The ship was wrecked on the south coast of Taiwan. Her fifteen crew survived. She was on a voyage from Fuzhou, China to Singapore, Straits Settlements.
Merchant	United Kingdom	The ship was driven ashore and wrecked at Vyborg, Grand Duchy of Finland. She was on a voyage from Kronstadt, Russia to Newcastle upon Tyne, Northumberland.
HMS Netley	Royal Navy	The Britomart-class gunboat was driven ashore at Aberdeen. She was refloated.
Northumbrian Maid	United Kingdom	The ship sprang a leak and was beached at "King's-cross Point". She was on a voyage from Troon, Ayrshire to Campbeltown, Argyllshire.
Olto	(Russian Empire) Grand Duchy of Finland	The steamship was driven ashore at Vyborg.

== 28 July ==
List of shipwrecks: 28 July 1871
Ship	State	Description
Flora Stewart	United Kingdom	The smack struck a rock and sank at Ballyshannon, County Donegal. She was on a voyage from The Rosses to Ballyshannon.

== 29 July ==
List of shipwrecks: 29 July 1871
Ship	State	Description
Aurora	United Kingdom	The schooner collided with the schooner John Stroud (United Kingdom) at Waterford and ran aground on the Seeds Bank.
Aurora	United Kingdom	The schooner collided with the schooner John Stroud (United Kingdom) and ran aground at Waterford.
Devenish	United Kingdom	The yacht ran aground in the River Laggan. She was refloated with assistance from the tug Vesta (United Kingdom).
Dolphin	United Kingdom	The schooner was run into in the River Thames by the steamship Lord Alfred Paget (United Kingdom) and was severely damaged. She was on a voyage from Seaham, County Durham to Rochester, Kent. She was taken in to Rochester in a leaky condition.

== 30 July ==
List of shipwrecks: 30 July 1871
Ship	State	Description
Ida S. Wilson	United Kingdom	The schooner was wrecked on the Longsand, in the North Sea off the coast of Essex. Her crew were rescued. She was on a voyage from Rotterdam, South Holland, Netherlands to Barrow-in-Furness, Lancashire. She was refloated on 2 August with the assistance of five smacks and taken in to Harwich, Essex in a leaky condition.
Westfield	United States	Illustration of the recovery of bodies after the Westfield disaster. The Staten Island Ferry, a steamboat, suffered a boiler explosion while moored at her slip at South Ferry on Manhattan in New York City. The explosion killed 85 people and injured hundreds of others.

== 31 July ==
List of shipwrecks: 31 July 1871
Ship	State	Description
Fenella	United Kingdom	The steamship ran aground off Rønne, Denmark. She was refloated and resumed her voyage.
Premier	New Zealand	The 296-ton barque went ashore while trying to leave the harbour at Oamaru, New Zealand. Her rudder unshipped and mast broke. Attempts were made to refloat her over the next two months, and were finally successful in late September, but before she could be placed under controlled tow she was dashed on the rocks and became a total wreck.

== Unknown date ==
List of shipwrecks: Unknown date in July 1871
Ship	State	Description
Agnes	United Kingdom	The schooner caught fire. She was towed in to Dundee, Forfarshire.
Alexander Petersen	Sweden	The ship was driven ashore and wrecked at Cimbritshamn. She was on a voyage from Kalmar to Copenhagen, Denmark.
Anna Krujer	Germany	The ship was driven ashore at Hela. She was refloated with assistance and taken in to Danzig.
Anglea Elisa	France	The ship was wrecked.
Augusta Maria	Germany	The ship was driven ashore at Jershöft. She was on a voyage from Rügenwalde to Stettin.
Avenir	France	The schooner foundered. Her crew were rescued. She was on a voyage from Antwerp, Belgium to Brăila, Ottoman Empire.
Axel	Denmark	The ship was driven ashore at Grenaa. She was on a voyage from Sunderland, County Durham, United Kingdom to Ringkøbing. She was refloated and resumed her voyage.
Barranquila	United States of Colombia	The steamship was lost in the Magdalena River.
Benedicta	United Kingdom	The ship foundered. She was on a voyage from the Guañape Islands, Peru to Falmouth, Cornwall.
Brenda	United Kingdom	The ship was driven ashore on Lundy Island, Devon. She was on a voyage from Newport, Monmouthshire to New Orleans, Louisiana. She was refloated and taken in to Bideford, Devon.
HMS Caledonia	Royal Navy	The Prince Consort-class ironclad ran aground off Santorini, Greece. She was later refloated and taken in to Malta.
Candidate	United Kingdom	The ship ran aground on the Pluckington Bank, in Liverpool Bay. She was refloated with assistance and taken in to Liverpool, Lancashire.
Champion of the Seas	United States	The ship was damaged by fire in the Pacific Ocean. She put in to Callao, Peru.
Chusan	Germany	The ship was wrecked on the Korean coast. Her crew were rescued.
Coranna	France	The ship ran aground on the Goodwin Sands, Kent, United Kingdom. She was refloated and resumed her voyage.
Cosmopolite	Netherlands	The schooner was wrecked at Castillos, Uruguay with the loss of a crew member. She was on a voyage from St. Catherine's to the River Plate.
Delphin	Netherlands	The ship ran aground off Goeree, Zeeland. She was refloated and towed in to Hellevoetsluis, Zeeland.
Dolphin	(United Kingdom of Great Britain and Ireland) Saint Vincent	The ship foundered off Saint Vincent.
Elena	Germany	The ship ran aground on the Millel Plate, in the Baltic Sea. She was refloated and towed in to "Brotelsinore".
Eliza	United Kingdom	The schooner ran aground at Helsingør, Denmark. She was on a voyage from Kronstadt, Russia to an English port. She was refloated.
Elizabeth Mary	United Kingdom	The ship ran aground in Grenville Bay. She was on a voyage from London to Grenada. She was refloated.
Enigheden	Norway	The sloop ran aground. She was refloated and found to be leaky.
Esther	United States	The ship was severely damaged by fire at Terneuzen, Zeeland.
Experiment	British Columbia	The schooner was driven ashore on Whitby Island, Washington Territory.
Faith	United Kingdom	The ship ran aground at Kertch, Russia. She was refloated.
Frihandel	Flag unknown	The ship ran aground off Hittarp, Sweden. She was on a voyage from Hartlepool, County Durham to Kronstadt.
George	Netherlands	The ship was wrecked in the Beryozovye Islands, Russia. She was on a voyage from Saint Petersburg, Russia to Macduff, Aberdeenshire, United Kingdom.
Georgia Todd	France	The ship was abandoned in the Atlantic Ocean before 10 July.
Glance	United Kingdom	The brigantine ran aground at a port in the Colony of Natal.
Grecian Daughter	United Kingdom	The ship capsized. She was taken in to Falmouth for repairs.
Guide	United Kingdom	The steamship ran aground at Port Royal, Jamaica. She was refloated.
Haco	France	The steamship was driven ashore. She was on a voyage from Kronstadt to Le Havre, Seine-Inférieure. She was refloated and taken in to Kalmar.
Hulda	United States	The ship ran aground off Hittarp, Sweden. She was on a voyage from Philadelphia, Pennsylvania, to Hamburg, Germany. She was refloated with assistance and resumed her voyage.
James Curtain	United Kingdom	The ship was abandoned in the Atlantic Ocean. She was on a voyage from Queenstown, County Cork to Miramichi, New Brunswick, Canada.
Joseph	Germany	The ship ran aground at Le Havre.
Kedar	Ottoman Empire	The steamship ran aground in Sarı Siğlar Bay. She was on a voyage from Constantinople to Liverpool. She was refloated and resumed her voyage.
Kosmopolitet II	Russia	The ship ran aground in the Hellegat. She was refloated and taken in to Brouwershaven, Zeeland.
Kyrre	United States	The ship was wrecked on Saaremaa, Russia. Her crew were rescued. She was on a voyage from Philadelphia, Pennsylvania, to Kronstadt.
Laura	United Kingdom	The schooner ran aground at Arthurstown, County Wexford. She was on a voyage from Odesa, Russia to Waterford. She was refloated and completed her voyage.
Wonder	United Kingdom	The brig was driven ashore on the coast of Livonia before 31 July. She was later refloated and taken in to Pärnu, Russia and placed under repair.
Lloreta	United Kingdom	The ship was towed in to Beaumaris, Anglesey in a sinking condition. She was on a voyage from Liverpool to Puerto Rico. She was consequently condemned.
Lord of the Isles	United Kingdom	The steamship ran aground on the Dovesnest Sandbank. She was on a voyage from Shanghai to Hankou, China. She was refloated.
Magnet	Canada	The steamship sank at Côte-Saint-Paul.
Marie Elizabeth	United Kingdom	The brig was driven ashore at Rangoon.
Mary Ann Christina	United Kingdom	The ship was wrecked on the Barra Vieja Beach, Mexico.
Meteor	United Kingdom	The steamship ran aground near Brouwershaven. She was refloated with assistance.
Minerva	United Kingdom	The ship was driven ashore on St. Paul Island, Nova Scotia, Canada before 18 July.
Mistero	United Kingdom	The ship was abandoned in the Atlantic Ocean. She was on a voyage from Buenos Aires, Argentina to a British port.
Moravian	United Kingdom	The ship was driven ashore in Lake St. Peter. She was on a voyage from Liverpool to Montreal, Quebec, Canada.
Moskova	Norway	The ship was wrecked in the Somme. Her crew were rescued. She was on a voyage from Saint-Valery-sur-Somme, Somme to a Norwegian port.
Muscovado	United States	The ship was driven ashore on Bodie Island, North Carolina. She was on a voyage from Baltimore, Maryland to Demerara, British Guiana. She was declared a total loss.
Nellie	United Kingdom	The steamship ran aground near Waterford. She was on a voyage from Brăila to Waterford. She was refloated and taken in to Waterford.
Neptune	Russia	The steamship was driven ashore on Saaremaa. Her crew were rescued.
Nuuauu	China	The ship was destroyed by fire at sea with the loss of a crew member.
Paul Hélène	France	The ship was wrecked on the coast of Vargas, Venezuela. She was on a voyage from Maracaibo, Venezuela to Marseille, Bouches-du-Rhône.
Pegasus	France	The ship ran aground in the Gironde. She was on a voyage from Japan to Bordeaux, Gironde. She was refloated and towed in to Bordeaux.
Pilch	United Kingdom	The steamship ran aground on the Patch Sand, in the Thames Estuary. She was on a voyage from London to South Shields, County Durham. She was refloated and resumed her voyage.
Plover	United Kingdom	The ship ran aground off "Hammernuil". She was on a voyage from Stornoway, Isle of Lewis, Outer Hebrides to Stettin.
Polly	United Kingdom	The Thames barge sank. She was on a voyage from Faversham, Kent to London.
Prince George	United Kingdom	The ship was wrecked at Bassein, India. Her crew were rescued. She was on a voyage from Bassein to Liverpool.
Red Cloud	United Kingdom	The ship was destroyed by fire at Shreveport, Louisiana, United States.
Regina	United Kingdom	The ship was abandoned in the Atlantic Ocean. Her crew were rescued. She was on a voyage from Quebec City, Canada to Southampton, Hampshire.
Rhea Sylvia	United States	The ship was driven ashore near Charleston, South Carolina. She was on a voyage from Charleston to London, United Kingdom. She was refloated and put back to Charleston.
Ripple	United Kingdom	The ship struck a rock and sank. Her crew were rescued. She was on a voyage from Bahia, Brazil to Liverpool.
River Forth	United Kingdom	The ship was abandoned off Cape Horn, Chile before 14 July. She was on a voyage from Newcastle upon Tyne, Northumberland to Callao.
Rose	New Zealand	The ketch sailed from Westport, New Zealand with a crew of three in early July, but failed to arrive at her destination. Wreckage identified as belonging to the Rose washed up near Karamea on 20 July.
Sagitta	Italy	The ship was driven ashore at Mahón, Spain before 7 July. She was on a voyage from Bahia to Genoa.
Samuel and Mary	United Kingdom	The ship ran aground at "Ossendam", Netherlands. She was on a voyage from Harwich, Essex to Rotterdam. She was refloated and taken in to Brouwershaven.
Scilly	United Kingdom	The ship ran aground on the Banco Graciado, at the mouth of the Uruguay River. She was on a voyage from Mercedes, Uruguay to Antwerp.
Severn	United Kingdom	The steamship was driven ashore near Sandhamn, Sweden. She was on a voyage from Stockholm, Sweden to Riga, Russia.
Stella	Netherlands	The steamship ran aground at Livorno, Italy. She was on a voyage from the Nieuw Diep to Livorno. She was refloated.
Thomas	United States	The ship was driven ashore at Cape São Roque. She was on a voyage from Pensacola, Florida to Montevideo.
Trinidad	United Kingdom	The ship was wrecked at Martinique before 7 July.
Ulleswater	United Kingdom	The ship was wrecked at Martinique before 7 July.
Victor	Germany	The steamship ran aground at "Southmole". She was refloated and taken in to Pillau.
HMS Vindictive	Royal Navy	The store ship foundered at Fernando Po. Her wreck was sold on 24 November.
Volador	Germany	The ship was wrecked on the coast of Korea. Her crew were rescued.
Warrior	United States	The ship was driven ashore near Vada, Italy. She had been refloated by 31 July and towed in to La Spezia for repairs.
White Jacket	United Kingdom	The ship was driven ashore and wrecked on Rodrigues. Her crew were rescued. She was on a voyage from Bombay, India to Hull, Yorkshire.
Xanthe	United States	The whaler was wrecked off Celebes, Netherlands East Indies before 18 July. Her crew were rescued.
