= Joseph Mendes da Costa =

Dutch sculptor

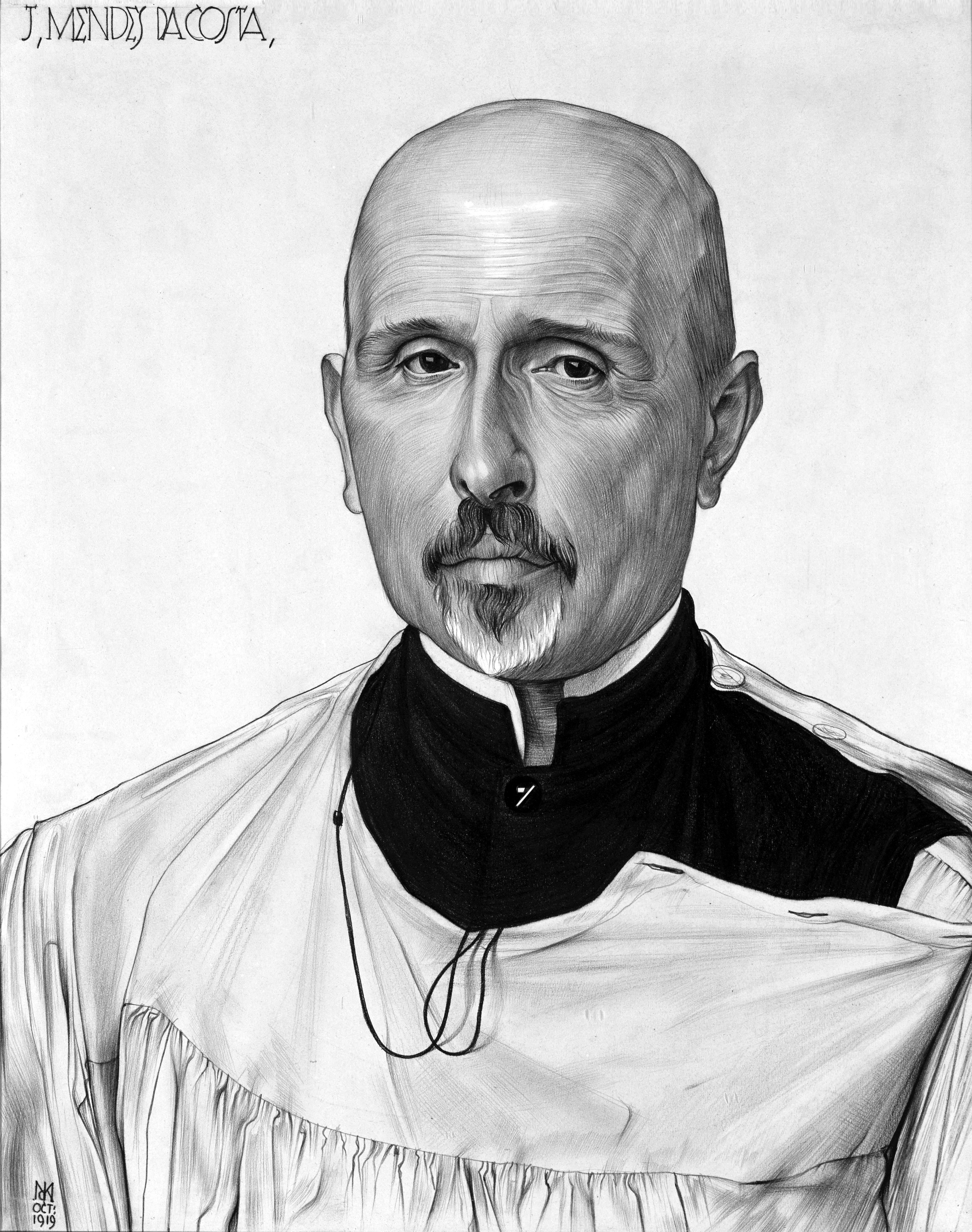
- Portrait of Da Costa by Michel de Klerk, 1919
- Born: 4 November 1863; Amsterdam
- Died: 20 July 1939 (aged 75)

Joseph Mendes da Costa (4 November 1863 – 20 July 1939) was a Dutch sculptor and teacher.

== Life and work ==
Mendes da Costa was born in Amsterdam to the sculptor Moses Mendes da Costa and Esther Teixeira de Mattos, sister of Henri Teixeira de Mattos and aunt of Joseph Teixeira de Mattos. He was taught by his father who kept a stone workshop where he made building details and gravestones. Later, Costa enrolled at the newly founded Quellinusschool where he studied under Bart van Hove. He was a member of the Portuguese-Jewish community in the Netherlands.

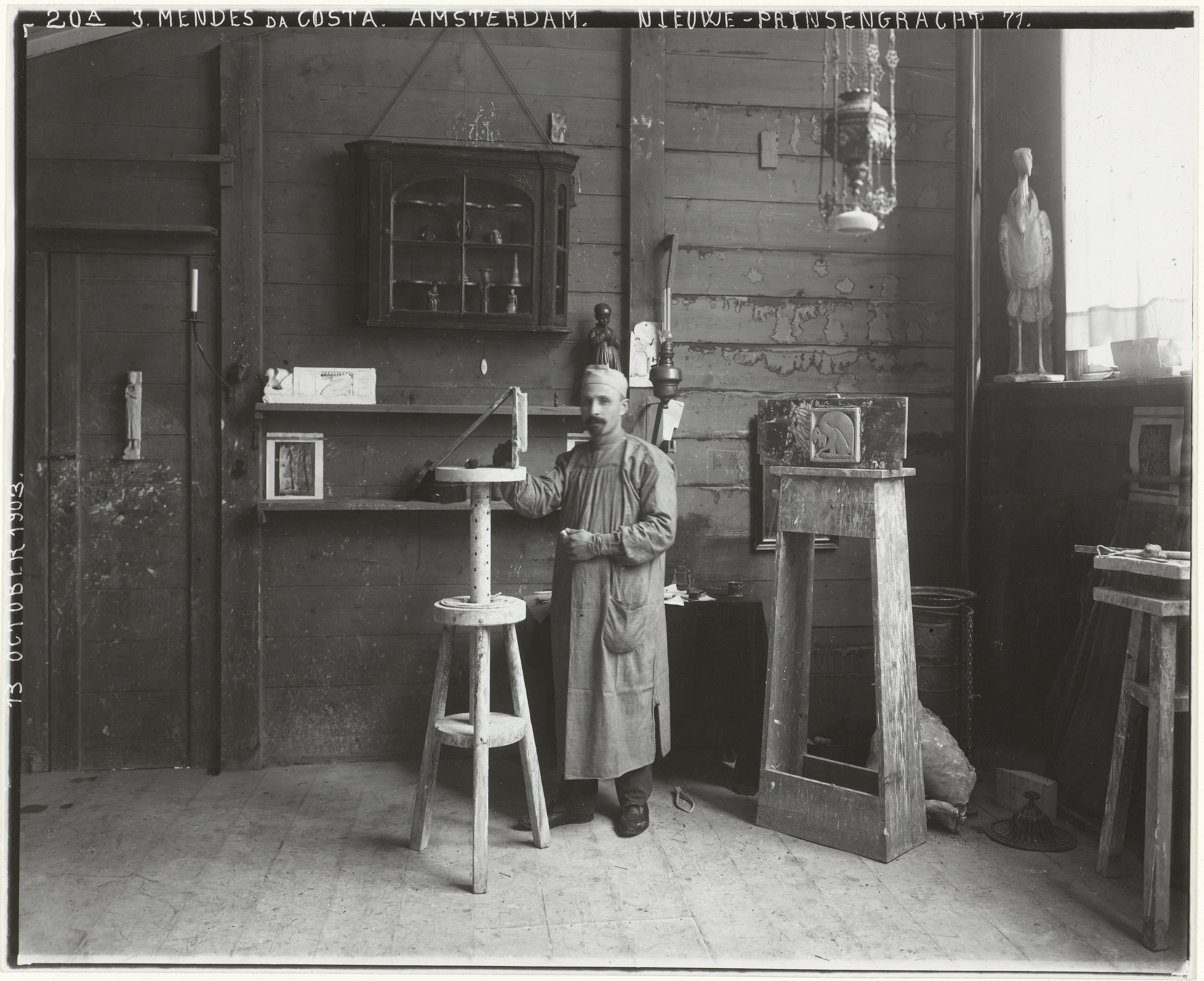
The sculptor in his workshop, by Sigmund Löw in 1903.

He is known for sculpted ornaments on buildings and became a draughtsmanship teacher at the Rijksakademie van beeldende kunsten who had many pupils himself, including Eva Cremers, Adrianus Johannes Dresmé, Therese van Hall, Bertha Koster-thoe Schwartzenberg, Jan de Meijer (1878–1950), Frank de Miranda, Adrianus Remiëns, Coba Surie, his nephew by marriage Joseph Teixeira de Mattos, and Tjipke Visser.

In 1891 he married Anna Jessurun de Mesquita, the sister of Samuel Jessurun de Mesquita. From 1911–1925 he lived and worked in Laren, North Holland but then moved back to Amsterdam.

In 1932 Helene Kröller-Müller commissioned him to design the impressive statue of her personal friend General Christiaan de Wet in the Hoge Veluwe National Park.

== Works ==
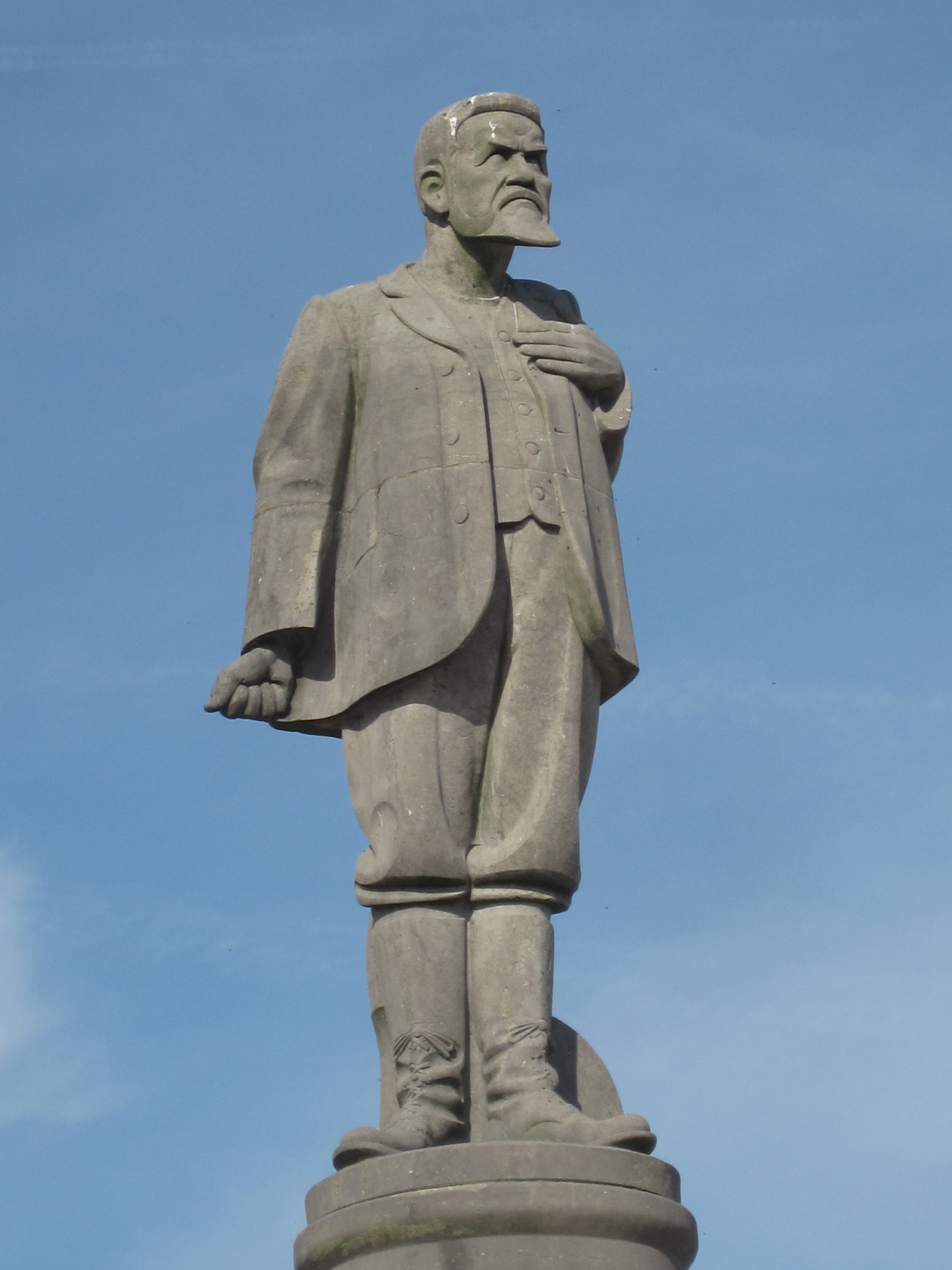

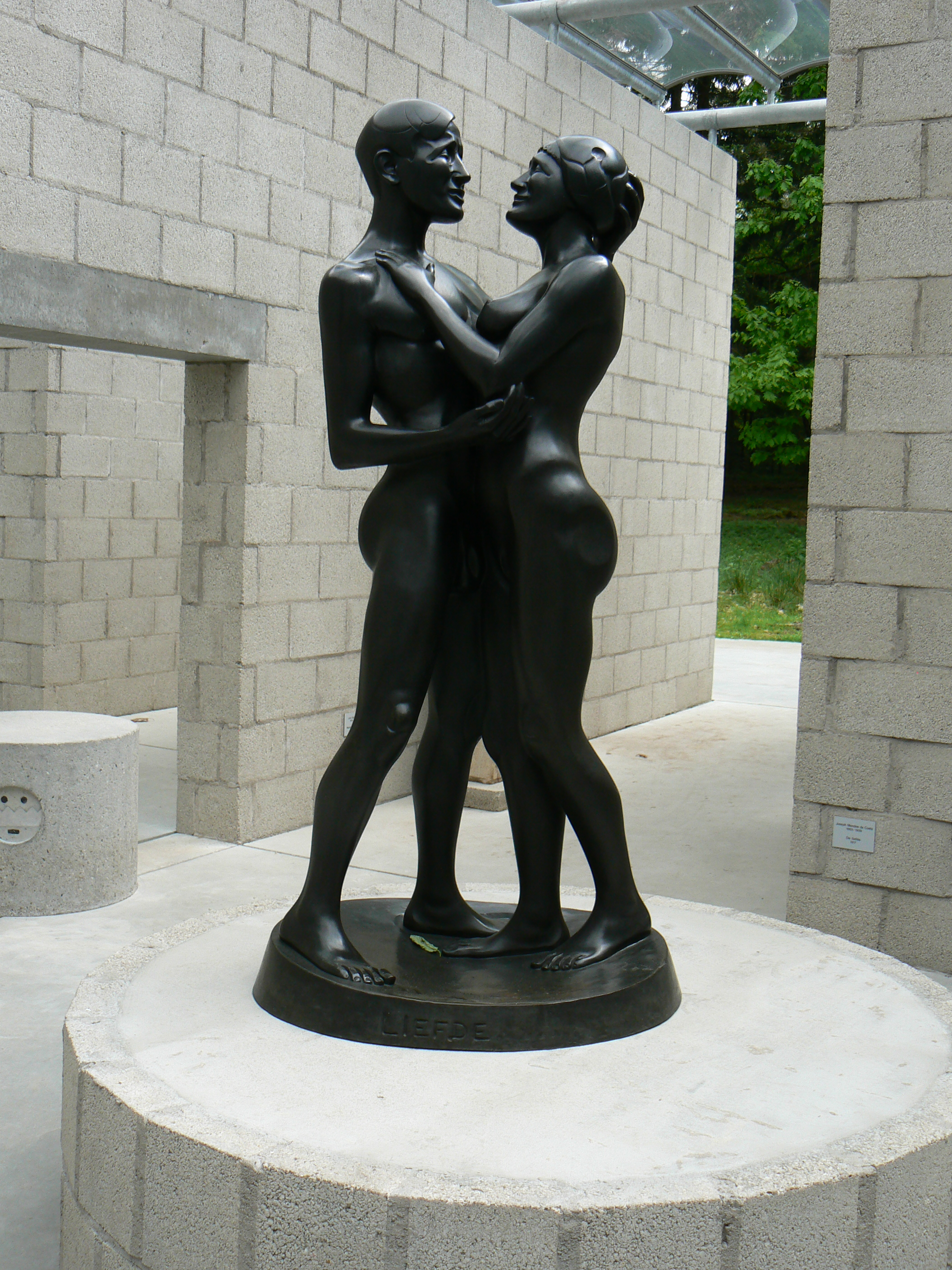
Love (1917), Kröller-Müller Museum

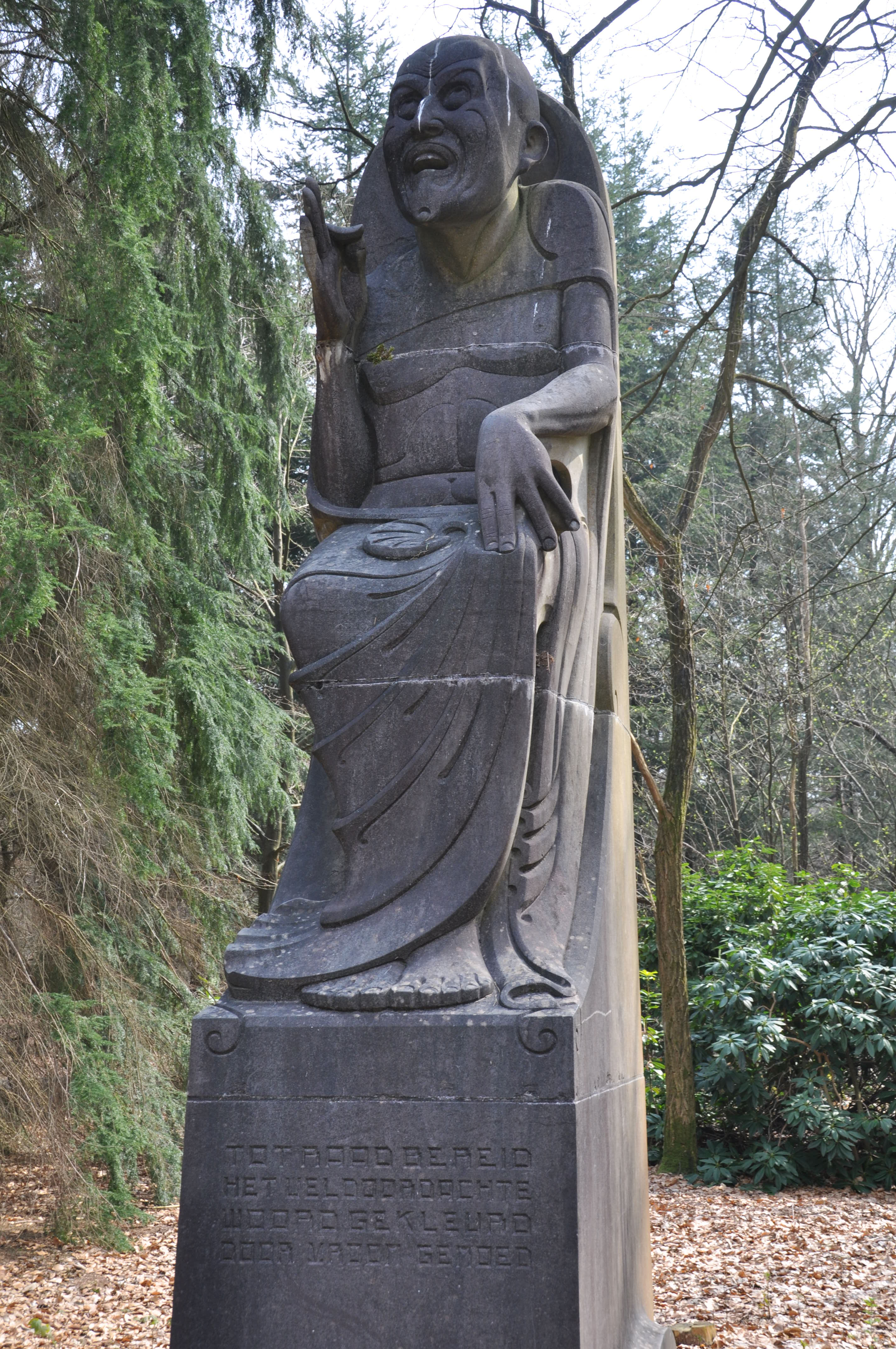
The philosopher (1920-1924), Jachthuis Sint-Hubertus

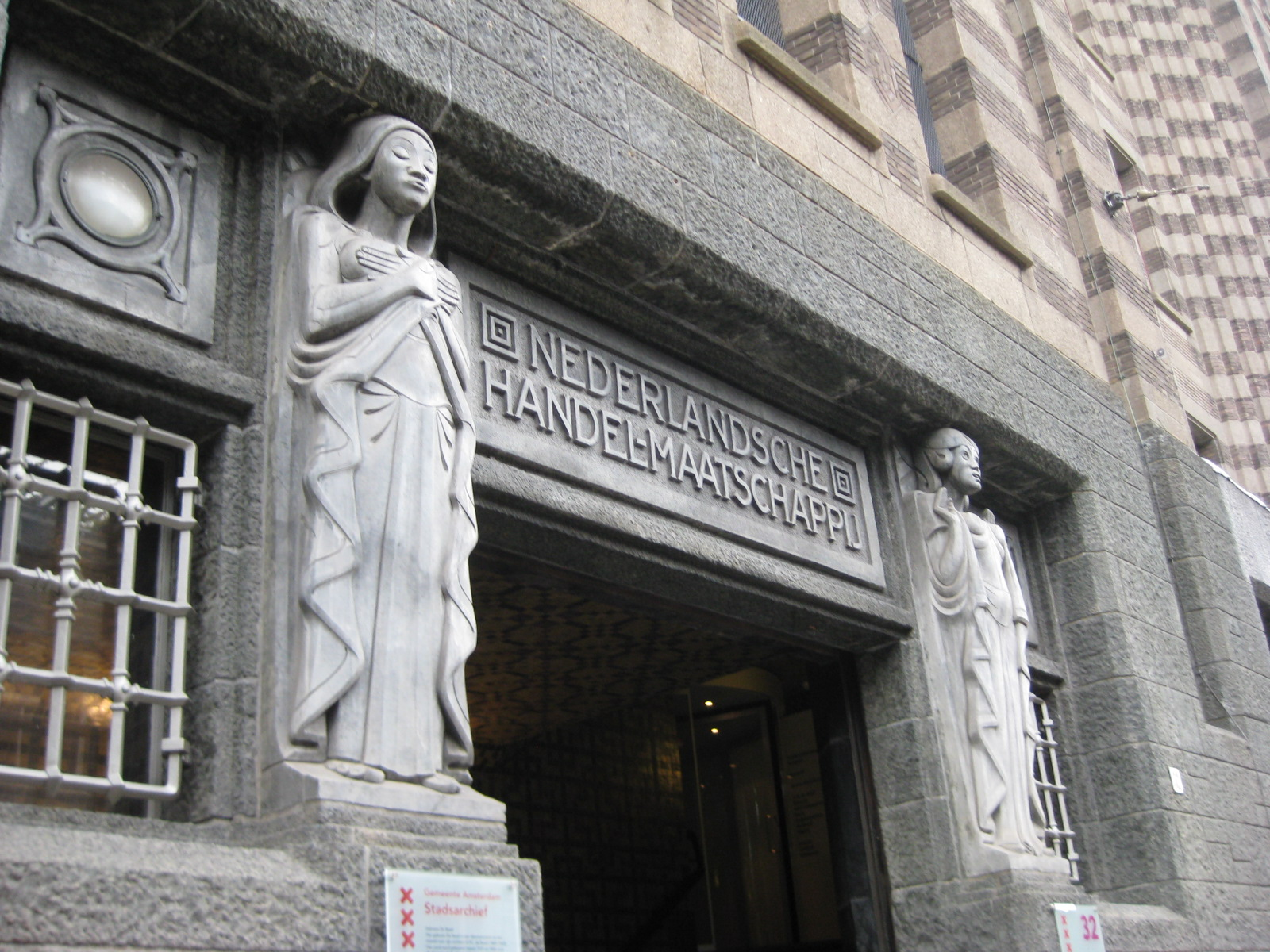
Sculptures on De Bazel, Amsterdam

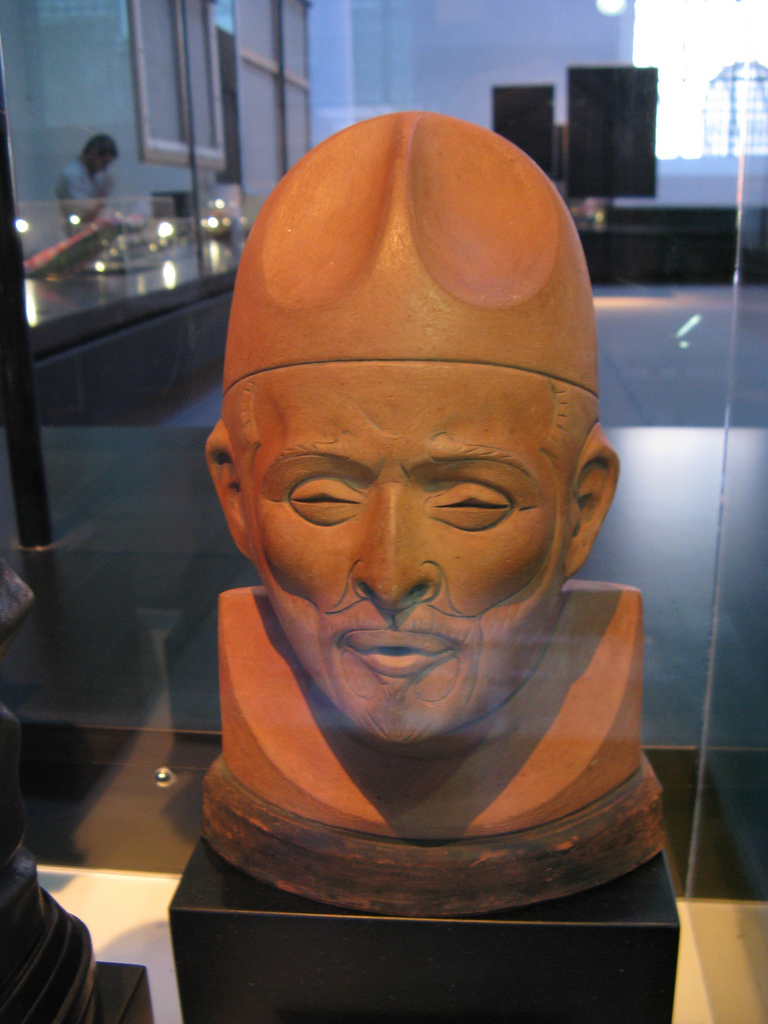
Self-portrait, 1927
