= Henri Teixeira de Mattos =

Dutch painter

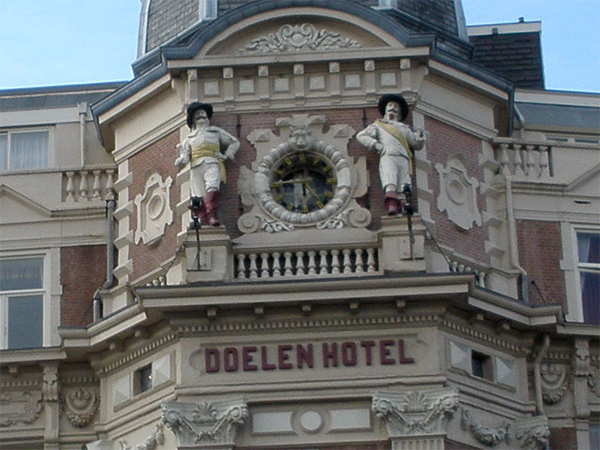
Statues of "schutters" (muskets missing)

Henri Teixeira de Mattos (1856–1908), was a 19th-century Dutch sculptor.

== Biography ==
Henri Teixeira de Mattos was born in Amsterdam and was the uncle of Joseph Mendes da Costa and Joseph Teixeira de Mattos. He studied at the Rijksakademie van Beeldende Kunsten and was a pupil of August Allebé, Bart van Hove, and Frans Stracké, receiving his diploma from the Quellinusschool. He was the teacher of Abraham Beck and Abraham Lopes Suasso. He died in The Hague.
