= Jan Derk Huibers =

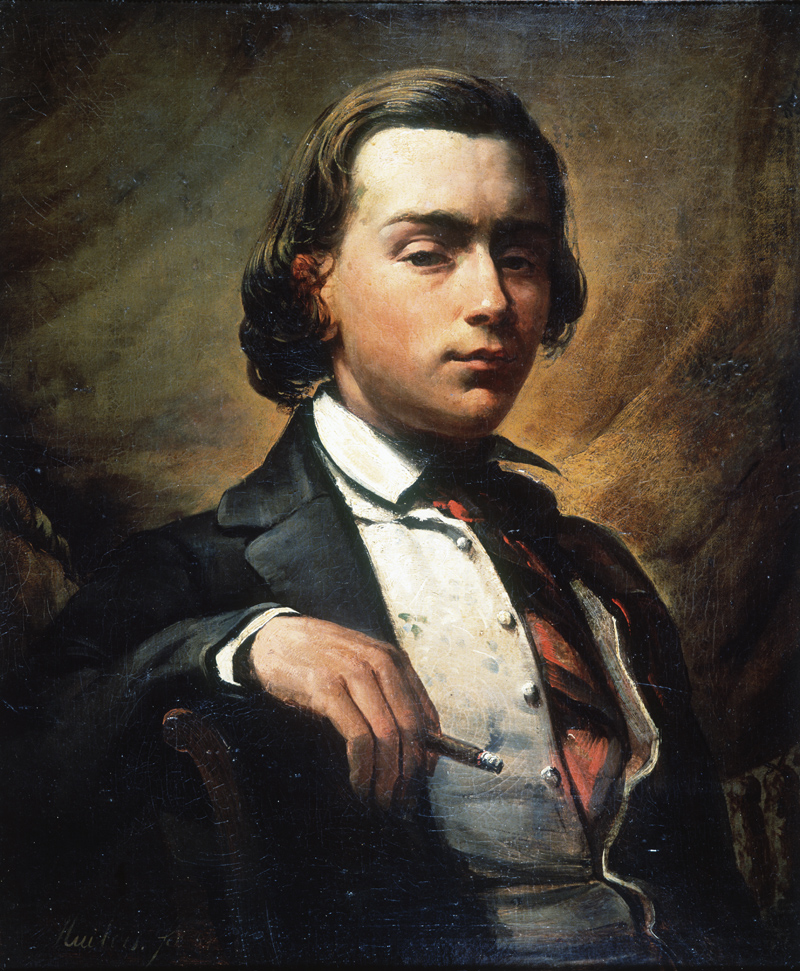
Self-portrait (1854)

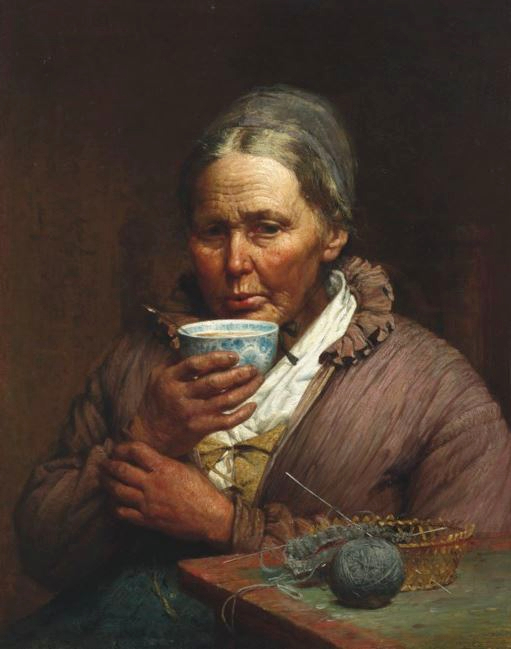
A Cup of Warmth

Jan Derk Huibers (27 December 1829, Deventer – 7 April 1918, Zeist) was a Dutch painter, graphic artist, and art teacher. He painted a wide variety of subjects, but is best known for his genre scenes. Some sources incorrectly give his year of death as 1919.

== Life and work ==
He was the son of Jan Derk Huibers, a merchant, and his wife, Maria Elisabet née Fonck. His artistic education began with evening classes at the local drawing school, where his teacher was Jacob Jansen Vredenburg. He continued his studies at the Royal Academy of Fine Arts, Antwerp, and the Rijksakademie in Amsterdam.

After completing his studies, he stayed in Amsterdam; becoming a member of Arti et Amicitiae. In 1868, he became a teacher at the drawing school operated by the Maatschappij tot Nut van 't Algemeen, a charitable organization. That same year, he married Elisabet Gerarda Hendriks, and began participating in the Exhibition of Living Masters.

From 1872, he also taught at the drawing school in Zwolle. His painting "Away from Home" won the Royal Gold Medal at an Arti et Amicitiae exhibition in 1876. He became one of the first instructors at the newly established Rijksnormaalschool voor Teekenonderwijzers, a teacher training school, in 1881. He was also a board member of the Association for Drawing Education.

In 1895, he was named a Knight in the Order of Orange-Nassau. He retired from all his positions in 1901, and received a pension. His many familiar students include Huib Luns, Co Breman, Franz Deutmann, Leo Gestel, Xeno Münninghoff, Georg Rueter, Kees Smout, Tjipke Visser and Dirk de Vries Lam.

He died at home, at the age of eighty-eight. A street in Deventer has been named after him.
