= Bart van Hove =

Dutch sculptor

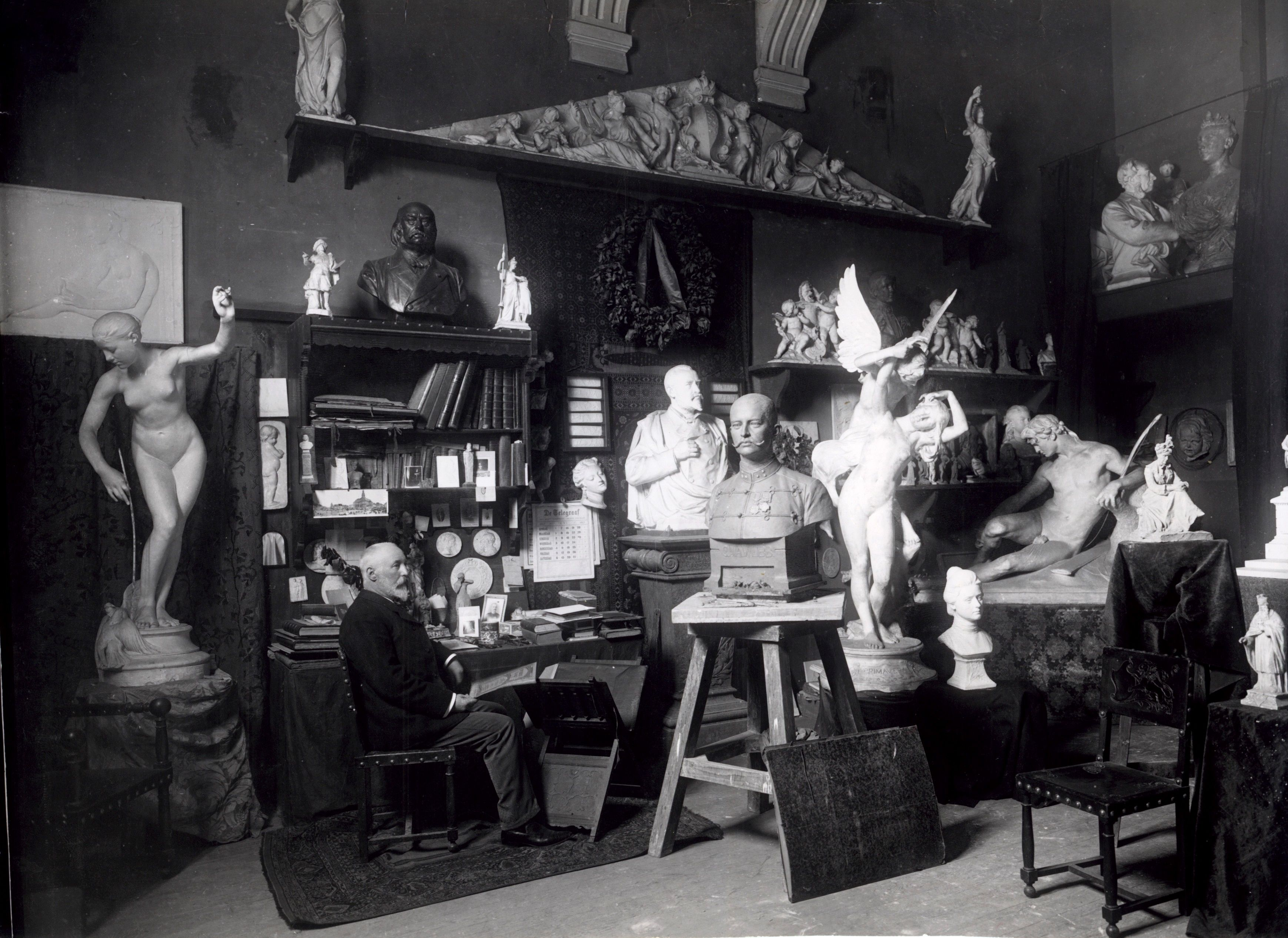
Bart van Hove in his workshop, 1903

Bart van Hove (18 March 1850 – 10 February 1914) was a 19th-century Dutch sculptor.

== Biography ==
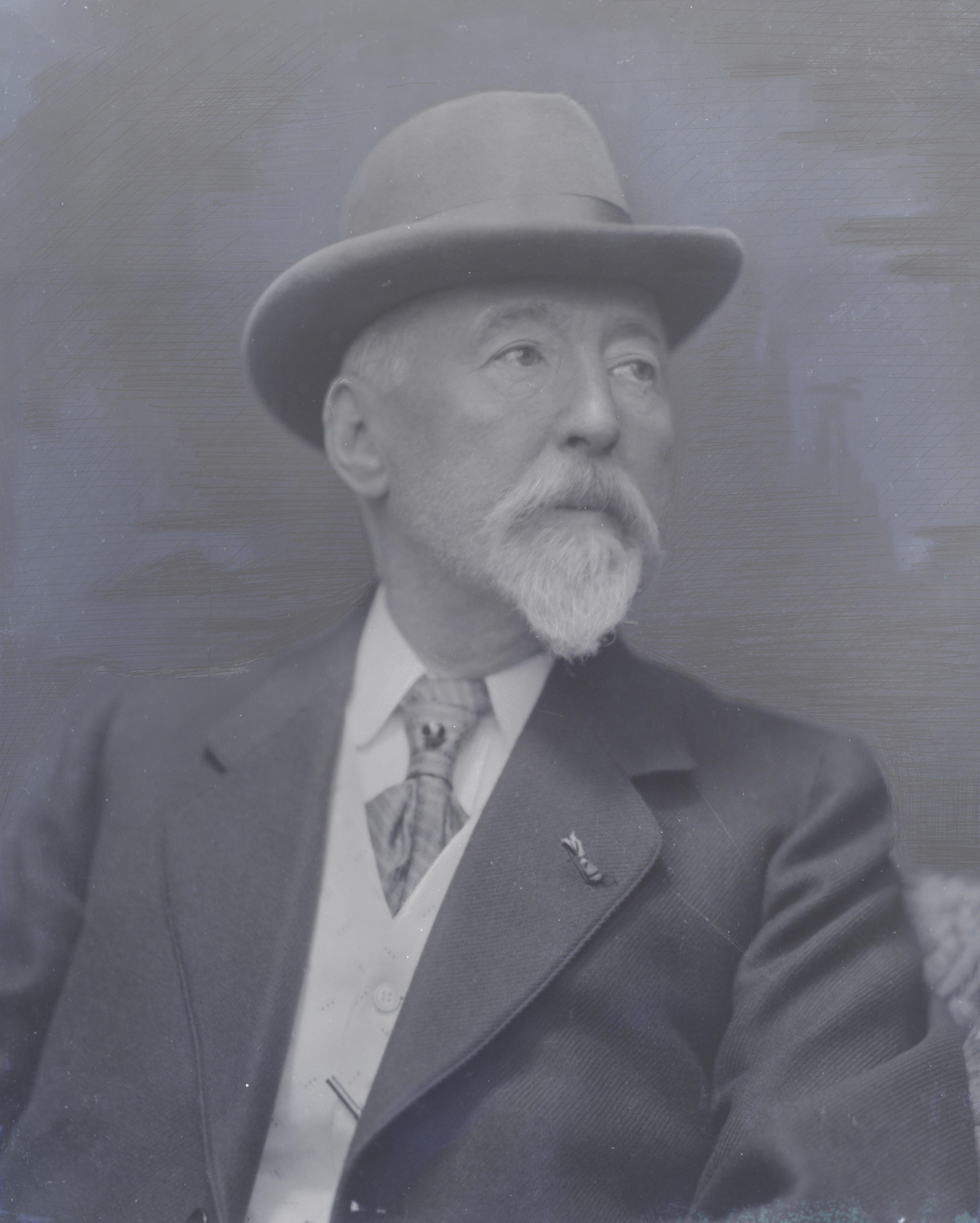
Van Hove

Van Hove was born in The Hague. According to the RKD he was the grandson of the painter Bartholomeus Johannes van Hove for whom he is named, and the son of Johannes and nephew of Hubertus. He was a pupil of Jozef Geefs and Eugène Lacomblé at the Akademie van beeldende Kunsten in The Hague. He studied 1870-1874 at the Nationaal Hoger Instituut voor Schone Kunsten in Antwerp, then won a Royal subsidy from Prince Hendrik to study in Paris under P.J. Cavelier at the Beaux-Arts from 1874-1878.

He won the Prix de Rome in 1881 to study for a year in Italy and moved to Amsterdam in 1882. In 1885 he became a teacher at the Quellinusschool in Amsterdam and in 1889 he became a director there. He was a member of Arti et Amicitiae and became the chairman from 1909 to 1913.

His pupils were Max Alexander Alandt, Jan Hendrik Baars, Thom Balfoort, Louise Beijerman, Gerard Bourgonjon, Leo Brom, Jan Bronner, Lambertus Franciscus Edema van der Tuuk, Annie Ermeling, August Falise, Chris Hammes, Albert Hemelman, Gerard Hoppen, Bernardus IJzerdraat, Hildo Krop, Louis Maria van der Maas, Joseph (II) Mendes da Costa, Elisabeth Francisca Nieuwenhuis, Frederik Amalius van Oostveen, John Rädecker, Theo van Reijn, Jan Rotgans, John Ruys, Lizzy Schouten, Jo Schreve-IJzerman, Anton Smeerdijk, Kees Smout, Jacobus Frederik Sterre de Jong, Henri Teixeira de Mattos, Frans Werner, Johannes Cornelis Wienecke, and Dirk Wolbers.

Van Hove died, aged 63, in Amsterdam.

== Works ==
As a respected teacher, Van Hove was often commissioned for public monuments. In 1886, he made the statues on top of the Teylers Museum in Haarlem on the Spaarne, entitled Science and Art crowned by Fortuna. The statues in the stairway to the auditorium were made by Van Hove in the 1880s to hold "electric lamps" since electricity was considered the trademark of the museum. The electric cords hanging sloppily down to the lamps suggests how new the idea was at the time (and that the lamps were probably first gas-lit).

Van Hove made a similar group on the top of the high school in Amsterdam named after Barlaeus, and the statue of St. Nicolas on top of the Basilica of St. Nicholas, Amsterdam. In 1888 he created the statues on the top of the City Theater of Amsterdam that burned down in 1890. In 1890 he made the monument to G.F. Westerman, the first director of Artis.

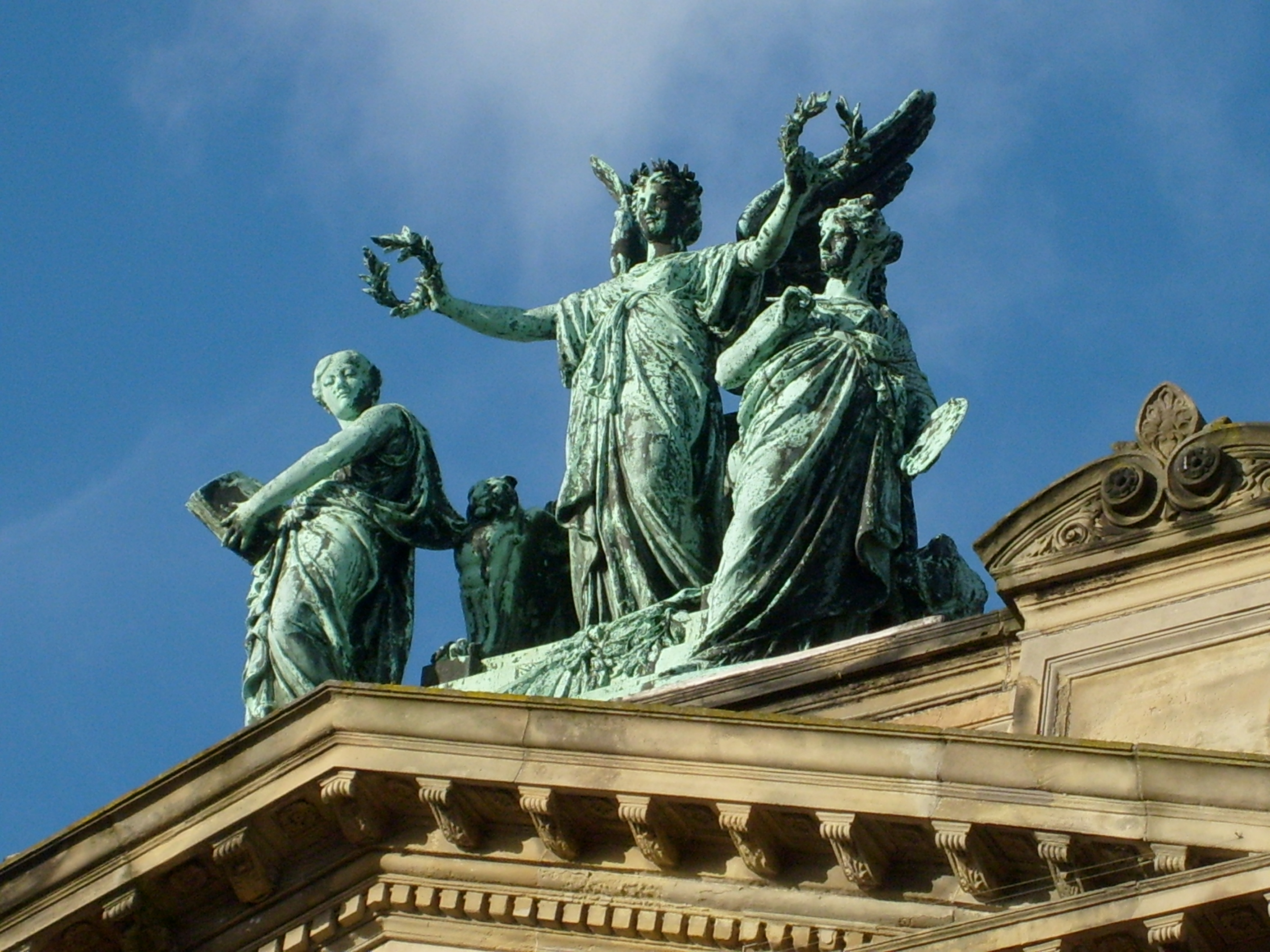
Teylers Museum (1889)

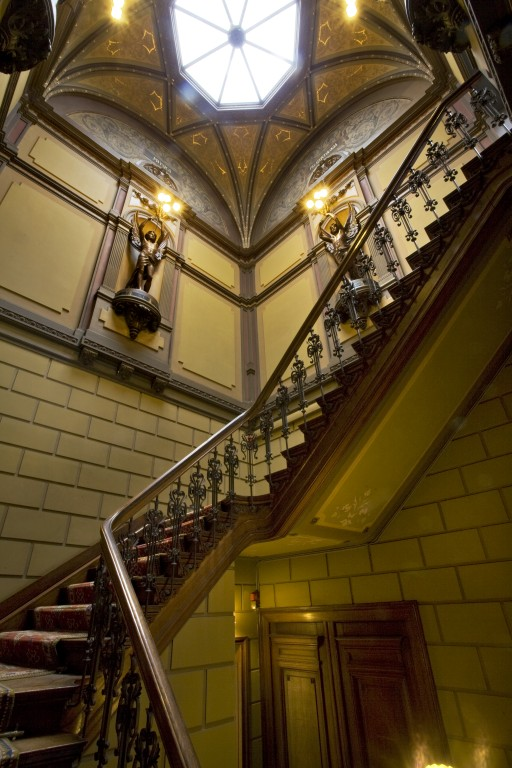
Staircase Teylers Museum

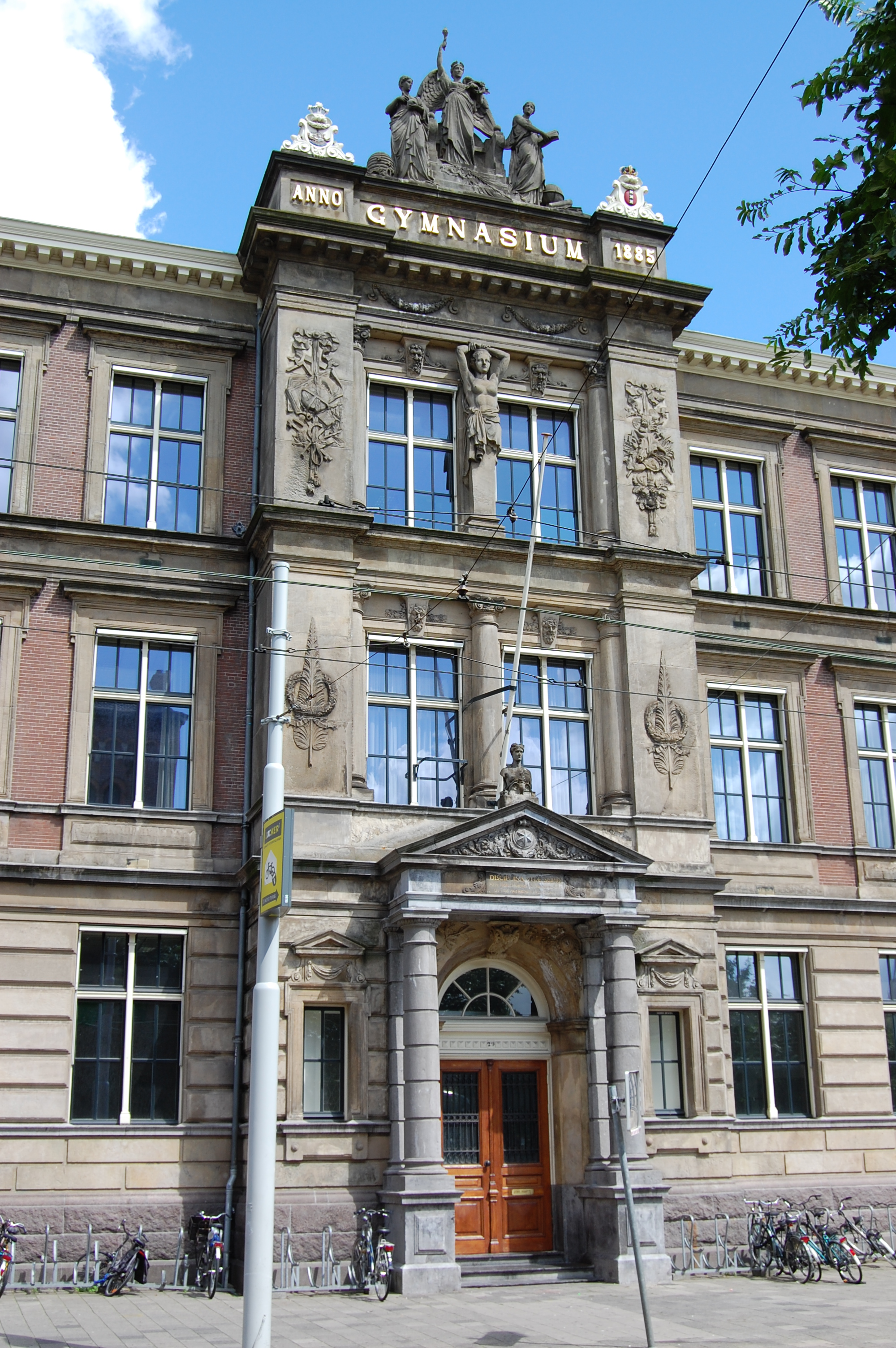
Barlaeus Gymnasium
