= Lizzy Schouten =

Dutch artist

- Born: Catherina Elisabeth Schouten; 28 April 1877; Amsterdam, North Holland, The Netherlands
- Died: 21 October 1967 (aged 90); Laren, North Holland, The Netherlands
- Other names: Lizzy Breman-Schouten
- Known for: Painting
- Spouse: Co Breman (m. 1910; died 1938)

Catherina Elisabeth Schouten (28 April 1887 – 21 October 1967) was a Dutch painter.

== Biography ==
Schouten was born on 28 April 1877 in Amsterdam. She studied at the Rijksakademie van beeldende kunsten (State Academy of Fine Arts) in Amsterdam. Her teachers included Carel Lodewijk Dake, Pieter Dupont, Bart van Hove, and Nicolaas van der Waay. Her work was included in the 1939 exhibition and sale Onze Kunst van Heden (Our Art of Today) at the Rijksmuseum in Amsterdam. She was a member of the Arti et Amicitiae, Kunstenaarsvereniging Sint Lucas, and the Kunstenaarsvereniging Laren-Blaricum.

In 1910, Schouten married fellow artist Co Breman (1865–1938). Soon after their marriage, the couple spent two years in Italy. Schouten died on 21 October 1967 in Laren, North Holland.
