= Alida van Houten =

Dutch artist

- self portrait, 1920
- Born: 22 August 1868; Groningen, Netherlands
- Died: 2 December 1960 (aged 92); Groningen, Netherlands
- Known for: Painting

Alida van Houten (1868-1960) was a Dutch painter.

== Biography ==
Van Houten was born on 22 August 1868 in Groningen. She was the sister of the artist Gerrit van Houten. She studied at the Academie Minerva. Her teachers included Ferdinand Oldewelt and Dirk de Vries Lam.

Van Houten's work was included in the 1939 exhibition and sale Onze Kunst van Heden (Our Art of Today) at the Rijksmuseum in Amsterdam. She was a member of Arti et Amicitiae, Kunstlievend Genootschap Pictura (Groningen), and Kunstenaarsvereniging Sint Lucas.

Van Houten died on 2 December 1960 in Groningen.
