= Dirk de Vries Lam =

Dutch painter

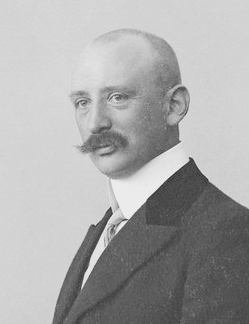
Dirk de Vries Lam (date unknown)

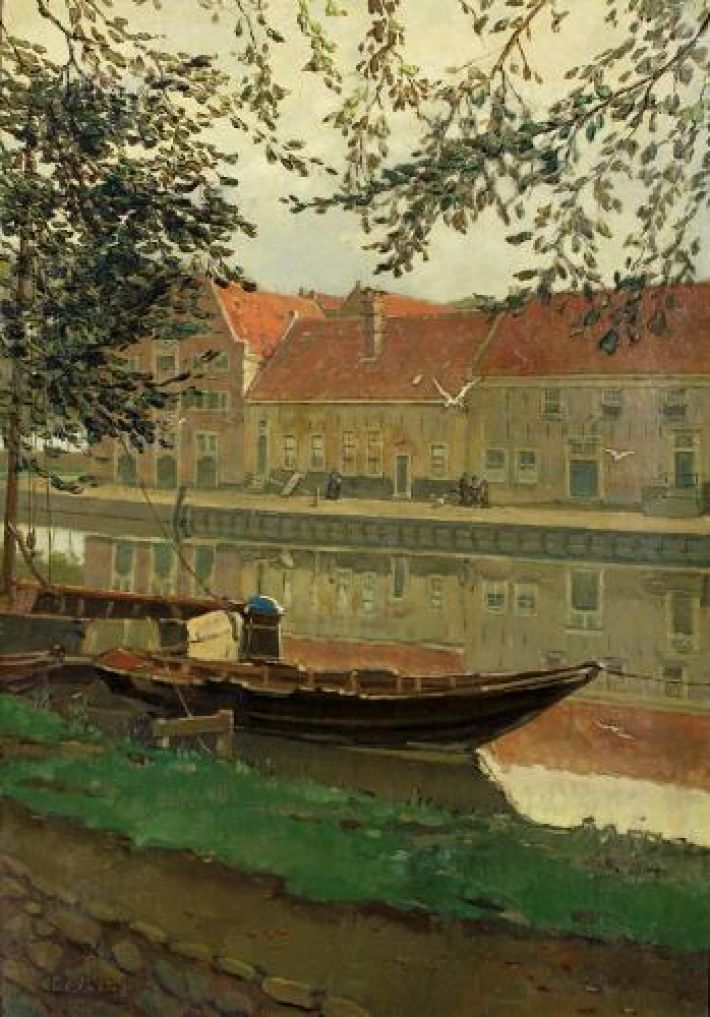
Houses on the Canal in Medemblik

Dirk de Vries Lam (20 January 1869, Leeuwarden – 5 July 1937, Groningen) was a Dutch painter who specialized in cityscapes. The name De Vries, from his mother's side of the family, was added, by official permission, in 1897.

== Life and work ==
He was the son of Herman Lam, a pharmacist, and his wife, Willempje née De Vries-Reilingh. He received his first drawing lessons at the Hogere Burgerschool in Leeuwarden. He then moved to Amsterdam, where he studied at the School of Applied Arts from 1888 to 1891. His instructors there included Jan Derk Huibers and Jacobus Roeland de Kruijff. This was followed by advanced studies at the Rijksakademie, with August Allebé and Pierre Cuypers. Upon graduating, he was awarded certificates in drawing and engineering.

Shortly after, he was appointed an instructor at the Teekenschool voor Kunstambachten (Arts and Crafts School) in Amsterdam. In 1895, he took a position as an art teacher at the Burgerschool in Enkhuizen. He also worked in Monnickendam, Volendam and Hoorn. In 1900, he married Sara Jacoba Maria de Gavere (1872–1953).

He received a major promotion in 1903; becoming Director of the Academie Minerva in Groningen. In that position, he increased the number of classes devoted to the practical and applied arts; adding courses on lithography, batik, and upholstery. He also ensured that his students learned how to paint directly from nature, rather than by copying existing works. In 1905, he added architecture to the curriculum. The Academie was incorporated as a Secondary Technical School in 1913.

He stayed there until 1934. His students included Jan Altink, Johan Dijkstra, Afina Goudschaal, Alida van Houten, Bart Peizel, Jan Wiegers and Jan van der Zee. Many of them would later belong to the artists' collective known as "De Ploeg".

In addition to painting and teaching, he was active as an art critic; contributing articles to the Groningsche Volksalmanak, among several others. He was also a board member of the Kunstlievend Genootschap Pictura, an organization devoted to promoting the visual arts.

== Sources ==
- Francis van Dijk, Leraren van de Academie Minerva : een keuze uit twee eeuwen kunstonderwijs in Groningen, H.J.W. Drijvers (Ed.). B & P, Groningen, 1998. pg.128 ISBN 90-5477-019-8
- G. Knuttel jr, "D. de Vries Lam", Elsevier’s Geïllustreerd Maandschrift, #49 Vol.97, 1939/1
