= Frank de Miranda =

Dutch sculptor, psychologist, and publicist (1913–1986)

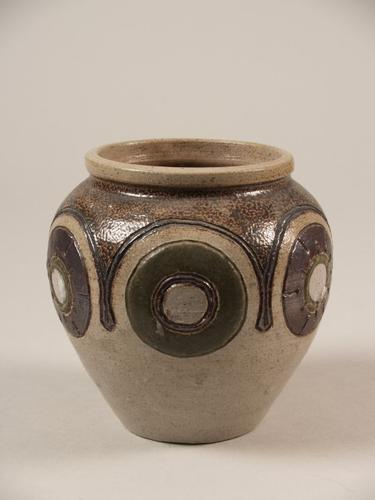
Jar with geometric decoration by Frank de Miranda, 1928-35

Frank de Miranda (8 March 1913 in Bloemendaal – 1986, in Ede) was a Dutch sculptor, psychologist and publicist.

== Life ==
Frank de Miranda was born in Bloemendaal, a town in the province of North Holland, where his father Abraham worked as designer/artist who came from an artistic family. Abraham had enjoyed a Jewish upbringing, but did not necessarily took this on his children, including Frank. Nevertheless, Miranda felt great solidarity with his Jewish background. Later on he studied the Tanakh, joined a Zionist movement, taught Hebrew, and gave Bible lessons later in life.

From 1925 to 1931 the young Frank attended to the Baarnsch Lyceum. When Miranda turned twelve in 1925, his father purchased him a pottery oven. He received lessons in pottery and sculptor from his father and from the glazed artist Joseph Mendes da Costa, which he had met at the age of eighteen. He received further training at the Amsterdam Nijverheidsschool.

De Miranda remains inspired by the work of Da Costa, with whom he kept in close contact until his death in 1939. De Miranda specialized in glazed pottery, which like Mendes da Costa's work, were usually coated with salt glaze. Besides, De Miranda include busts of wood, also inspired by Mendes da Costa's work.

From 1956 to 1959 studied Miranda pedagogy at the University of Utrecht. He then worked as a psychologist and publicist.

== Selected publications ==
- 1978 - Mendes Da Costa, Jessurun De Mesquita: Nederlandse Beeldende Kunstenaars, Joden in De Verstrooiing
- 1979 - Het heilige en de mens: religieuze en priesterlijke werkelijkheidsbenadering: religie als richtingbepaling
- 1984 - Autobiografische notities

== See also ==
- List of Dutch ceramists
