= Gerrit van Houten =

Dutch artist (1866–1934)

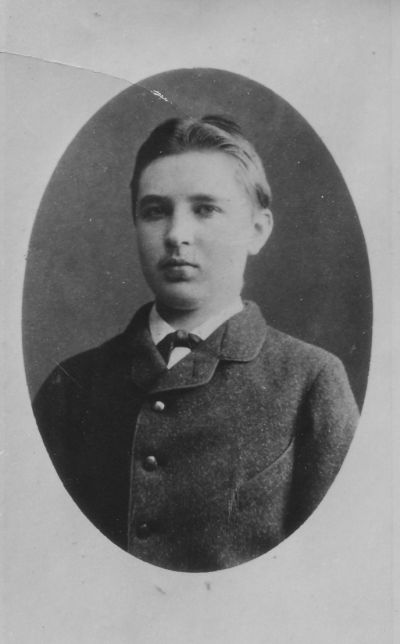
Gerrit van Houten

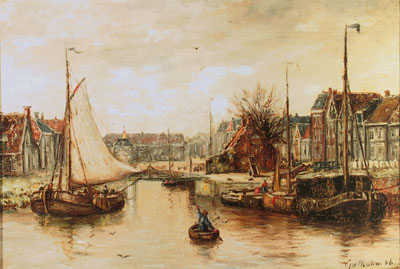
Damsterdiep in Groningen (1886)

Gerrit van Houten (also known as Gerry Wood; 29 August 1866, in Groningen – 18 January 1934, in Santpoort) was a Dutch painter and artist.

The Van Houten family lived just outside the gates of the city of Groningen on the Damsterdiep canal. Although Gerrit would still recognize number 215, the house where he was born on 29 August 1866, its surroundings would seem most strange.

The layout of the house is much the same, with the water pump still in the kitchen, although it no longer works. The stable is now used for storage. A corridor and one of the rooms in the former office would still look familiar to Gerrit, because they are exactly as they were with the door panels that he himself painted.

The house belonged to the timber merchants and sawmill run by Gerrit's father Hindrik and Hindrik's brother Jakob. The sawmill ‘De Twee Reizigers’ stood next to the house on the Damsterdiep canal. Behind the house ditches had been dug; the timber was steeped in these to increase its durability. To the west were the city ramparts and the Steentilpoort gate; in all other directions fields as far as the eye could see.

== Domestic setting ==
Gerrit grew up in an artistic family. His father Hindrik, who as well as running a business was active in politics, serving on the municipal and provincial councils, liked to draw in the little free time that he had. Although Gerrit's mother, Alida Cornelia Christina ten Bruggencate did not draw, she did have a great interest in art. Gerrit's older brother Derk also drew and painted, but stopped when he became too busy in his work at the timber merchants. Gerrit's younger sister Alida became a painter, but she did not have his talent. Then there was his aunt, Sientje van Houten, who was married to the famous painter Hendrik Willem Mesdag and who painted herself. And Gerrit's cousin Barbara, the daughter of Gerrit's uncle Samuel van Houten (the famous minister), was also a painter. It is not known whether Gerrit's younger brothers Samuel and Jan and youngest sister Sientje painted or drew.

Gerrit started drawing lessons at Academie Minerva when he was still at primary school. His father helped him every Sunday, with Derk and Alida joining in. Gerrit did well at school, but was often ill. When jaundice kept him at home for three months in the winter of 1879/1880, his parents gave him a tin of watercolours to occupy his time. Watercolour painting is a difficult technique, but Gerrit had soon mastered it.

He produced his first oil painting in 1881, a seascape. His brother Derk had lent him his paints.

The Van Houten children often spent the summer holidays with their grandparents Ten Bruggencate in Almelo, and after their grandparents’ deaths with their uncle and aunt Ten Bruggencate, who continued to live in the family home. Gerrit drew a lot in this wooded setting.

After primary school, Gerrit attended the Stedelijk Gymnasium. However, the combination of school and drawing soon became too much for him. His parents therefore decided to take him out of school at the end of the second year to allow him to focus on an artistic career.

== Emerging artist ==
As he no longer needed to attend school, Gerrit could travel to The Hague with his father in September 1882. The aim of the trip was not only to draw and paint but also to show his work to others. The Hague was the artistic centre of the Netherlands at the time. His uncle H.W. Mesdag and the art dealers Goupil & Cie tried to help Gerrit break into the art world there, but he did not succeed.

Back in Groningen Gerrit continued to try to make a name for himself as an artist. He had already managed to have his watercolour De Bornse hut, which he had painted at the end of 1881, exhibited at Kunstlievend Genootschap Pictura in March 1882. In November of the same year he again exhibited a few watercolours at Pictura. They were well received and he would exhibit work there a few more times afterwards.

The year 1883 was a year of setbacks. Gerrit's father Hindrik died on 6 May after a brief illness, aged only 50. As a consequence, the planned visit by Jozef Israels was cancelled. Once again, the young painter had missed the opportunity to get himself noticed with the aid of a famous artist.

Later that year he tried to exhibit his work outside Groningen too, even succeeding in having a seascape admitted to the Exposition Internationale in Nice.

Although Gerrit was a somewhat shy lad in daily life, he corresponded with various art societies and organizations at home and abroad. But despite all this correspondence, he never managed to sell a single work.

== Education ==
Gerrit may have stopped attending school, but this did not signal the end of his education. He received private tuition in French, German and English, and discussed how best to improve his skills as an artist with the director of the Academie Minerva, Egenberger. Egenberger concluded that there was little more for him to learn at the Academie. Gerrit's uncle, Sam van Houten, his guardian since the death of his father, advised him to follow botany and zoology classes at the University. He did this for a short while, but it soon became clear that the classes were of little use to his drawing and painting. He learnt more about the theory and practice of drawing in perspective drawing lessons with S. Berghuis.

Gerrit decided to sit the entrance exam to the Rijksacademie van Beeldende Kunsten in Amsterdam, but was rejected. On the advice of Uncle Mesdag he travelled to The Hague in October 1884, because he could follow lessons at the Academie there without sitting an entrance exam. However, this was not a success either, and Gerrit returned to Groningen after a few short months.

He no longer took lessons and was thus left to his own devices. This he found difficult, and he became depressed. The shyness that was initially no more than a personality trait gradually became social withdrawal. To break out of this he went to stay with family, first in Almelo and then in Deventer, but his condition did not improve. On doctor's orders, he was admitted to a spa and sanatorium for nervous disorders in Laag Soeren. He stopped drawing altogether in his first weeks there, but in time began to enjoy it again. At the instigation of his mother, Gerrit left the sanatorium to stay with his uncle and aunt in Almelo, who lavished care and affection upon him. His condition improved somewhat, but this proved short-lived.

As Gerrit's care was a burden on the family, his mother decided to move him elsewhere. Through an advertisement she came into contact with a Dr Fischer from Surhuisterveen, who was prepared to take Gerrit into his family. Gerrit moved to Friesland in September 1887, where he spent his time playing the piano and filling one sketchbook after the other. In 1890 he moved with the doctor and his family to Lippenhuizen, but Mrs Fischer's death in October 1891 marked the end of his stay in Friesland.

Gerrit returned to his uncle and aunt in Almelo for a short time, while the family sought a long-term solution, but his condition only worsened. In October 1892, at the age of 26, he was admitted to Oud Meerenberg in Santpoort, which would later become the Provincial Hospital of North Holland. This marked the definitive end of an artistic career that was nipped in the bud and that had already exhibited marked decline after Gerrit's twentieth. Gerrit van Houten died in Santpoort on 18 January 1934 and was buried at the Zuiderbegraafplaats cemetery in Groningen.

== The work of Gerrit van Houten ==
Gerrit van Houten left about 900 drawings, 180 watercolours and 85 oil paintings. His brothers and sisters looked after his work once he was no longer able to. Only very few works are owned by private collectors, and one or two have disappeared without trace. Gerrit is known to have destroyed one work.

Most of the drawings are sketches and detail, colour and composition studies. For Gerrit drawing was an aid. In his sketchbook, he recorded anything that might serve as the subject of a watercolour or oil painting. Even finished drawings must be seen as studies, although studies or compositions have been found for few of his oil paintings and watercolours. He probably did much of his work en plein air location. His subjects were never far away: the garden and surroundings of the house in Groningen, the landscape of the province of Twente when he was staying in Almelo, portraits and still lifes.

Once in Surhuisterveen Gerrit stopped oil painting and sometime later watercolour painting, but he carried on drawing until he was admitted to hospital in Santpoort. The drawings no longer served as studies for oil paintings or watercolours but as an end in themselves. The subjects were more or less the same as before: still lifes of flowers, windmills, the countryside around Surhuisterveen and trees. But they are rough and show that illness had affected his drawing skills. Once admitted to Santpoort, Gerrit was forbidden from drawing or painting.

== The Gerrit van Houten Foundation ==
The Gerrit van Houten Foundation was established in 1945 on the advice of the family notary. Its aim was to keep Gerrit's work together and to bring it to the attention of the public. Gerrit's brothers and sisters Jan, Samuel, Alida and Sientje formed the first board. They all admired their brother's talent and had named the Foundation as heir. Over the years, the Foundation made various attempts to have Gerrit's work put on permanent display, first in the Groninger Museum and later in the Singer Museum in Laren, but these never resulted in more than a temporary exhibition.

In 1972 the Foundation was able to purchase the Fraeylemaborg castle. A separate Foundation, to which the Gerrit van Houten Foundation belonged, was set up to administer this. Two rooms in the castle were made available for the works belonging to the Gerrit van Houten Foundation.

A day nursery is currently situated in the house where Gerrit van Houten was born. The office of the former timber merchants is now the meeting room of the Gerrit van Houten Foundation, which still owns the oil paintings, drawings and watercolours of Gerrit van Houten.

The Foundation tries to bring the work of Gerrit van Houten to the attention of the public by exhibiting selections of his work in the Fraeylemaborg and by making the collection available for museum exhibitions. In 2006 the Foundation established the Gerrit van Houten Prize, which is awarded once every five years. The aim of the prize is twofold: to bring the work of Gerrit van Houten to the attention of the public and to stimulate contemporary artists.
