= Air Bremen =

German airline

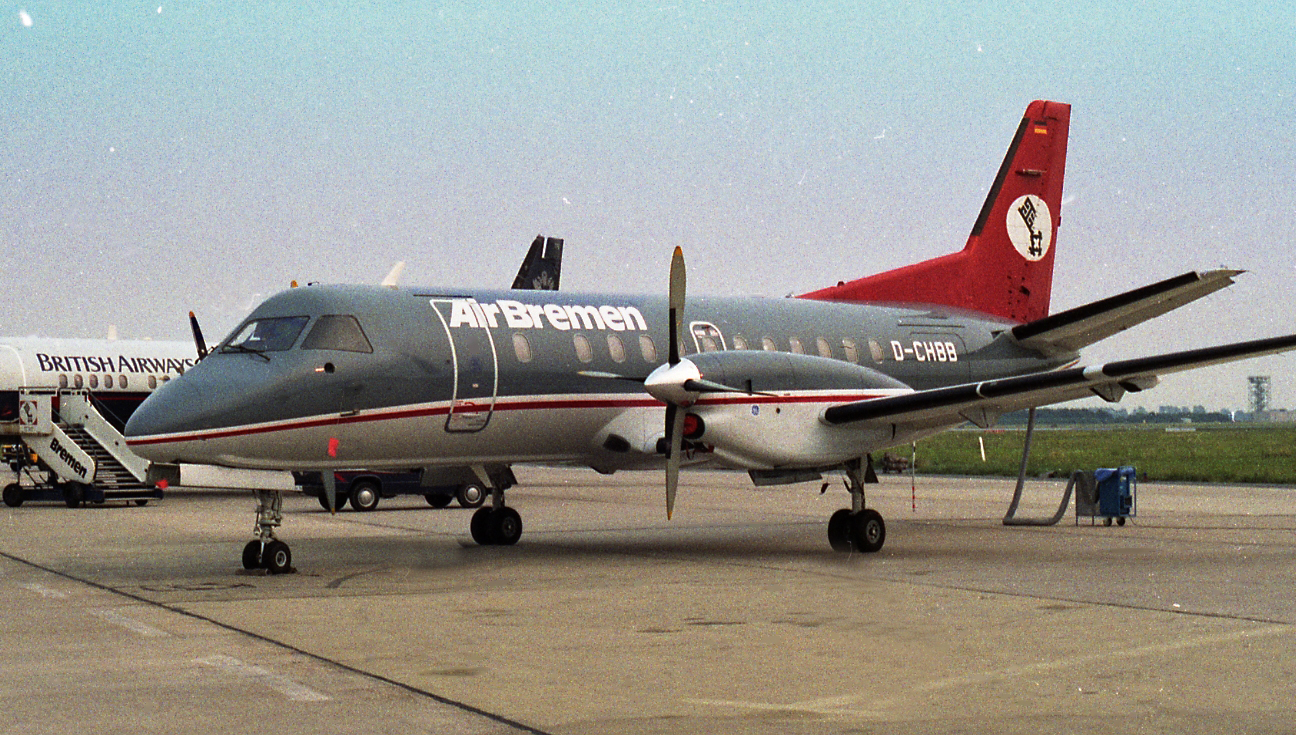
- Saab 340
IATA	ICAO	Call sign
HR	BRN	AIR BREMEN
- Founded: 6 November 1988
- Commenced operations: March 1989
- Ceased operations: 22 August 1990
- Hubs: Bremen Airport
- Fleet size: 3
- Headquarters: Bremen, Germany

Air Bremen was a small German regional airline based in Bremen operating between 1989 and 1990.

== Fleet ==
The Air Bremen fleet consisted of the following turboprop aircraft:

- 3 x Saab 340
