= German trawler V 302 Bremen =

History
- Name: Karl Kühling (1929-37); Bremen (1937–52)
- Owner: Hochseefischerei Julius Weeting AG (1929–34); Nordsee Deutsche Hochsee Fisherei Bremen-Cuxhaven AG (1934–39); Kriegsmarine (1939–45); Nordsee Deutsche Hochsee Fisherei Bremen-Cuxhaven AG (1945–53)
- Port of registry: (Weimar Republic) Bremerhaven, Germany (1929–30); (Weimar Republic) Nordenham (1930–33); (Nazi Germany) Nordenham, Germany (1933–34); (Nazi Germany) Wesermünde, Germany 1934–39); Kriegsmarine (1939–45); Wesermünde, Allied-occupied Germany) (1945–49); Wesermünde, West Germany (1949–53)
- Builder: Schiffswerft von Henry Koch AG
- Yard number: 279
- Launched: April 1929
- Completed: 21 May 1929
- Commissioned: 29 September 1939
- Out of service: November 1952
- Identification: Code Letters OVMT (1929–34); Fishing boat registration BX 202 (1929–30); Fishing boat registration ON 136 (1930–34); Code Letters DNON (1934–53); Fishing boat registration PG 475 (1934–39, 1945–53); Pennant Number V 302 (1939–45)
- Fate: Scrapped

General characteristics
- Type: Fishing trawler (1929–39, 1945–53); Vorpostenboot (1939–45)
- Tonnage: 372 GRT, 140 NRT (1929–36); 408 GRT, 156 NRT (1936–53)
- Length: 46.18 metres (151 ft 6 in) (1929–36); 50.65 metres (166 ft 2 in) (1936–53)
- Beam: 7.90 metres (25 ft 11 in)
- Draught: 3.68 metres (12 ft 1 in)
- Depth: 4.28 metres (14 ft 1 in)
- Installed power: Triple expansion steam engine, 88nhp
- Propulsion: Single screw propeller
- Speed: 11 knots (20 km/h)

V 302 Bremen was a German fishing trawler that was requisitioned by the Kriegsmarine during the Second World War for use as a vorpostenboot. She was built in 1929 as Karl Kühling and was renamed Bremen in 1937. She was returned to her owners post-war and was scrapped in 1953.

== Description ==
As built, the ship was 46.18 metres (151 ft 6 in) long, with a beam of 7.90 metres (25 ft 11 in). She had a depth of 4.28 metres (14 ft 1 in) and a draught of 3.68 metres (12 ft 1 in). She was assessed at 372 GRT, 140 NRT. She was powered by a triple expansion steam engine, which had cylinders of 40 centimetres (15 3/4 in), 64 centimetres (25 3/8 in) and 104.6 centimetres (41 3/16 in) diameter by 68 centimetres (26 3/4 in) stroke. The engine was built by the Ottensener Maschinenbau GmbH, Altona, Germany. It was rated at 88nhp. It drove a single screw propeller, and could propel the ship at 11 knots (20 km/h).

== History ==
Karl Kühling was built as yard number 279 by the Schiffswerft von Henry Koch, AG, Lübeck, Germany for the Hochseefischerei Julius Weeting AG, Bremerhaven, Germany. She was launched in April 1929 and completed on 21 May. The fishing boat registration BX 202 was allocated, as were the Code Letters OVMT. On 16 June 1930, her registration was changed to ON 136, then to PG 475 on 4 September 1934. On 10 November, she was placed under the management the Nordsee Deutsche Hochsee Fisherei Bremen-Cuxhaven AG. During 1934, her code letters were changed to DNON. Karl Kühling was lengthened in 1936. She was now 50.65 metres (166 ft 2 in) long and was assessed at 408 GRT, 156 NRT under the ownership of the Nordsee Deutsche Hochsee Fisherei Bremen-Cuxhaven AG.

In January 1937, her name was changed to Bremen. She was requisitioned by the Kriegsmarine on 20 September 1939 for use as a vorpostenboot. She was allocated to 3 Vorpostenflotille as V 302 Bremen. She was returned to her owners on 18 August 1945. In November 1952, she sprang a leak and sank in the North Sea. Although raised, she was scrapped in Hamburg, West Germany in January 1953.

== Sources ==
- Gröner, Erich (1993). Die deutschen Kriegsschiffe 1815-1945 (in German). Vol. 8/I: Flußfahrzeuge, Ujäger, Vorpostenboote, Hilfsminensucher, Küstenschutzverbände (Teil 1). Koblenz: Bernard & Graefe. ISBN 3-7637-4807-5.
