= Evert Breman =

Dutch architect (1859–1926)

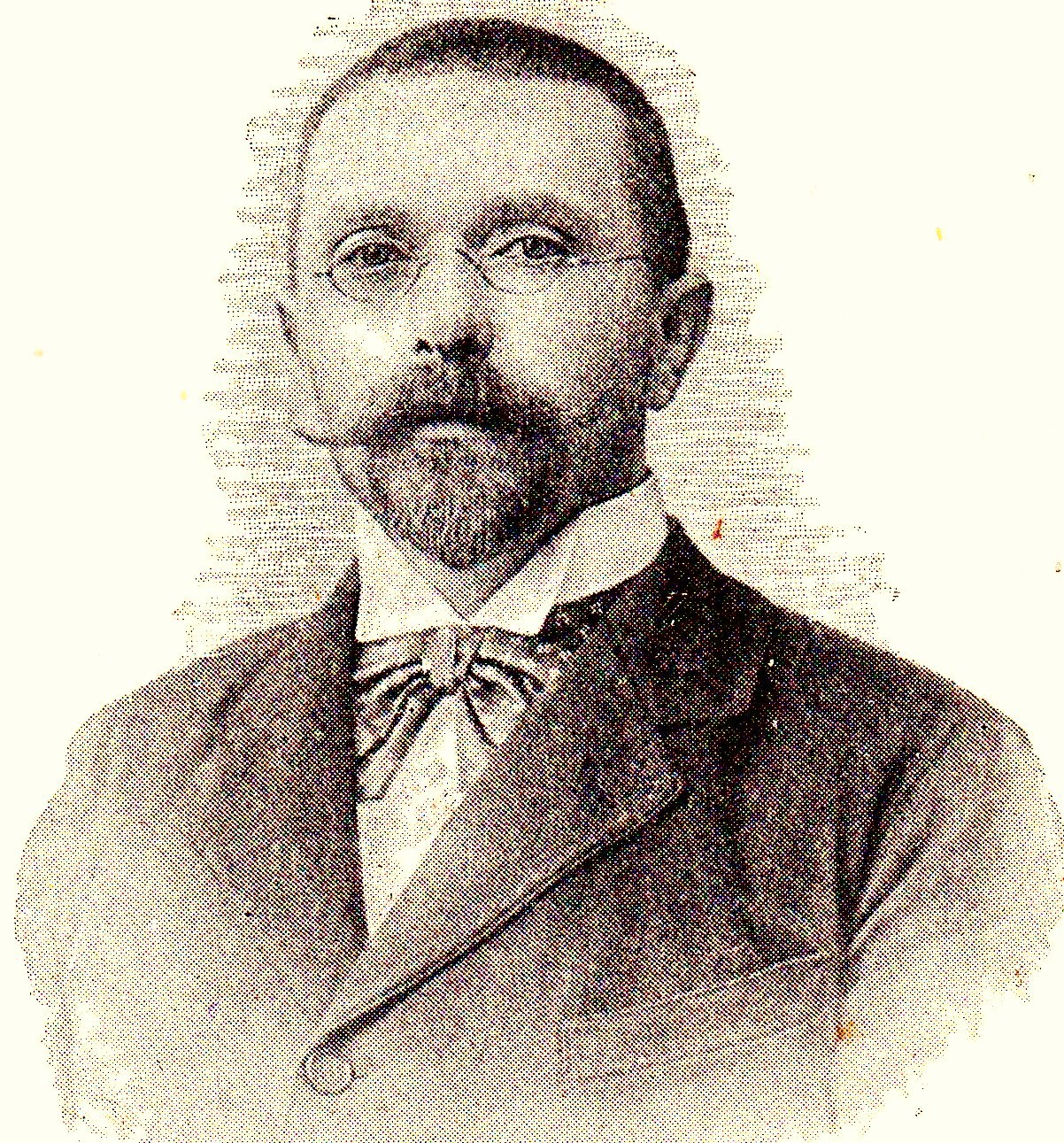
Evert Breman (From Eigen Haard, 1895)

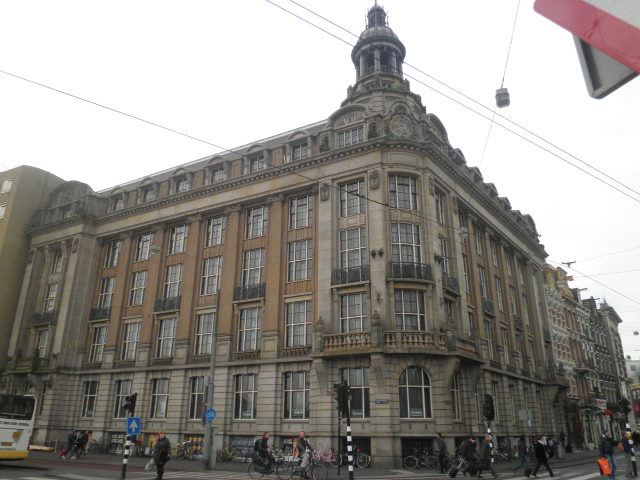
The Lloyd Building

Evert Breman (28 April 1859, Zwolle – 24 October 1926, Amsterdam) was a Dutch architect in the Renaissance Revival style.

== Biography ==
He was one of six children born to Willem Fredrik Breman (1829-1875), owner of a carpentry and blacksmithing shop, and his wife, Everarda Elsebé née Meuleman. In 1881, he and his younger brother, Jacobus (known as "Co"), left Zwolle. Co would pursue his artistic career in Brussels, while Evert went to Amsterdam. There, he apparently worked as a butcher, while studying architecture in the evenings. His experience in his father's shop had already given him some basic knowledge of construction. He designed his first buildings in 1886; two homes on the Nassaukade. His first major project, in 1888, was an office building for De Nederlanden van 1845, an insurance company.

In 1887, he married Martha Maria Neumeijer (1857-1938), the daughter of Leendert Johannes Neumeijer Sr. (d.1906), a real estate agent and amateur architect. They had two sons; the musicologist, Willem Frederik Breman, and Leendert Johannes Breman, a diplomat. One of his grandchildren would describe him as a "tyrannical father".

By 1895, he had fully established his reputation, and was hired as the principal architect of the World Exhibition for the Hotel and Travel Industry, held at the Museumplein. Most of the site was devoted to the miniature village of "Old Holland", with 16th and 17th-century façades. For his work on the exhibition, he was named a Knight in the Order of Orange-Nassau.

His largest projects were commissioned by Koninklijke Hollandsche Lloyd, a shipping company, from 1917 to 1922. These included their corporate headquarters, and the Lloyd Hotel. After 1923, he was employed in the real estate industry, as a supervisory Director for the North Holland Mortgage Bank. He died at the age of sixty-seven, and is interred at the New Eastern Cemetery. Although not an innovator, his buildings are highly regarded.
