= SS Bremen (1858) =

German steam passenger liner ship

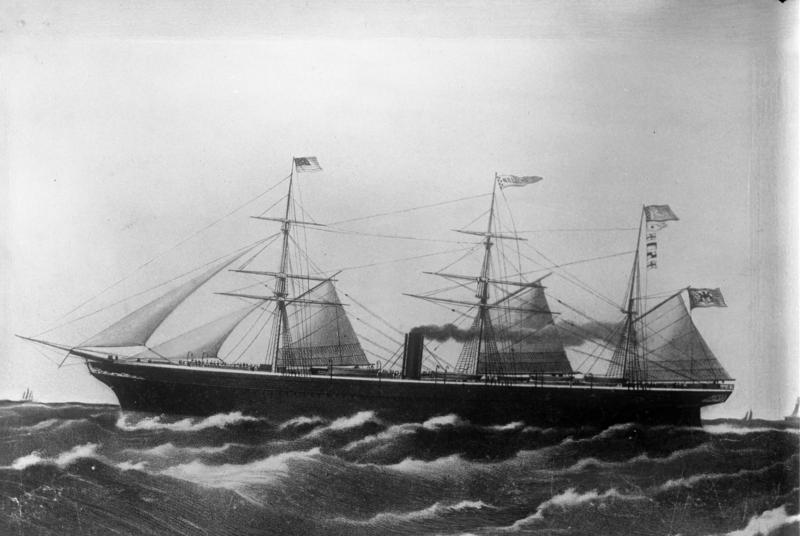

History

/Bremen / German Empire
- Name: Bremen
- Namesake: Bremen
- Owner: North German Lloyd
- Port of registry: Bremen
- Builder: Caird & Company, Greenock, Scotland
- Yard number: 53
- Launched: February 1, 1858
- In service: 1858–1874
- Fate: Sold to the British company Edward Bates & Company in June 1874

United Kingdom
- Name: Bremen
- Owner: Edward Bates & Company
- Acquired: June 1874
- In service: 1874–1882
- Fate: Grounded and sunk in the Farallon Islands, off the coast of California by fog, 1882

General characteristics
- Tonnage: 1,750 GRT
- Length: 332.86 ft (101.46 m)
- Beam: 39.00 ft (11.89 m)
- Propulsion: 1 × steam engine, 700 hp (520 kW) screw propeller
- Speed: 11.5 knots (21.3 km/h; 13.2 mph)
- Capacity: 60 First Class; 110 Second Class; 401 Steerage Class
- Complement: 102–118 Crew members

SS Bremen was a German steam passenger liner, built in Greenock, Scotland by the Caird & Company shipyard. She was Norddeutscher Lloyd's first passenger ship and the first to bear the name Bremen, the ship operated under the German flag from 1858 until her sale in 1874 and operated under the British flag until 1882, before sinking in the Farallon Islands, off the coast of California due to heavy fog.

== Construction and launching ==
The Bremen had a total cargo capacity of up to 1,000 tons, she had a steam engine with a consumption of between 2.2 and 2.5 kg of coal per hour. Caird & Company designed the Bremen as a clipper-like design and with a barque-style sailing rig. She had a funnel and three masts for sails, which increased her gross register tonnage to 1,750 tons.

The ship was launched on 1 February 1858 in Greenock, launched in the presence of the German consul Hermann Henrich Meier, which he would quote later; “And so we have moved forward with confident courage. In our coat of arms —an anchor crossing the Bremen key and enclosing it in an oak leaf wreath— you see our motto. In the anchor, we hold fast the hope that the key will open for us the routes of communication that we wish to maintain with German manhood, perseverance, and loyalty”. After successful sea trials and the final details added, the ship departed for Bremerhaven, where she was welcomed by Eduard Crüsemann, executive and co-founder of Norddeutscher Lloyd, Arnold Duckwitz, then mayor of Bremen, and the City Senate.

== Service history ==
=== Under Norddeutscher Lloyd (1858–1874) ===
She made her maiden voyage on March 19, 1858, departing from the Bremerhaven roadstead under the command of Captain Heinrich Wessels with a stop in the port city of Southampton, England before heading directly to New York City. The ship was carrying about 150 tons of cargo, including mail, 22 cabin passengers and 93 third-class passengers, the ship would make the stop in Southampton as planned and arrive in New York on July 3, 1858, making the 14-day 13-hour journey. Upon arriving in New York, the ship was witnessed in front of 450 American people and guests, the Bremen would also demonstrate a test run in Sandy Hook, New Jersey, among the guests was also the American poet and educator Henry Longfellow, the return trip took place between July 17 and 30, returning with 220 tons of cargo and 60 passengers. This was the maiden voyage for Norddeutscher Lloyd as a shipping company and competitor in the North Atlantic.

On January 14, 1860, the Bremen arrived at Southampton under sail, due to the breakage of her propeller screw, this caused the ship to be taken out of service for six months for repairs, entering service again until July 8, 1860 on the Bremen–New York route. In 1864, the ship was upgraded with a new boiler and steel screw propeller built by the German industrial company Krupp. On 5 November 1873, she would make her last service under Norddeutscher Lloyd on the Bremen–Southampton–New York route, before being decommissioned.

=== Under Edward Bates & Company (1874–1882) ===
In June 1874, the Bremen along with the New York, would be sold to the British firm Edward Bates & Company for around 19,000 pounds at the time. The sale of the ships was announced in the Provinzial-Zeitung newspaper on February 1, 1874.

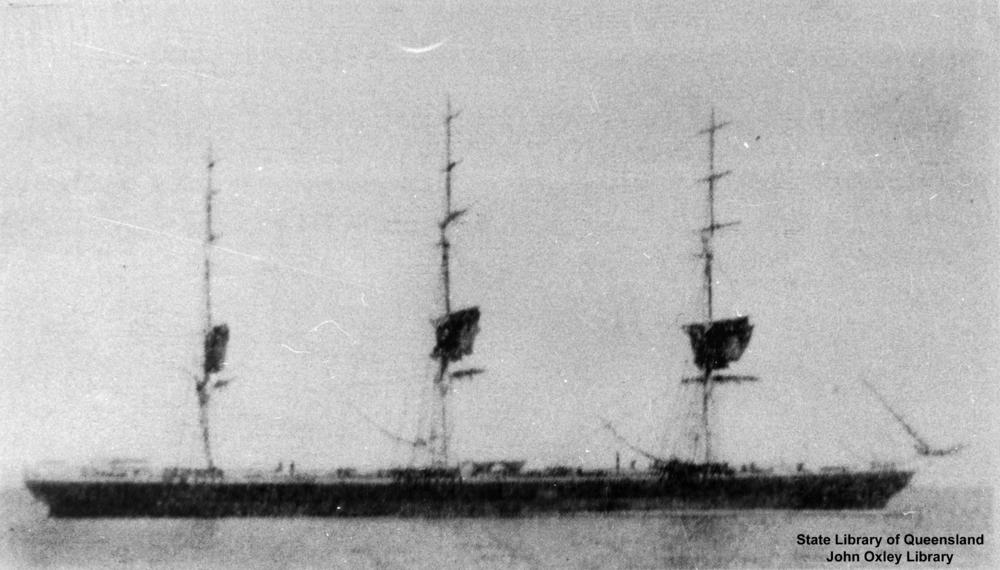
The Bremen after conversion into a sailing ship

Under his new company, the ships were converted to sailing vessels, eliminating their steam propulsion and propellers, and carrying migrants and cargo.

On October 16, 1882, the Bremen ran aground on the Farallon Islands, 10 nautical miles from San Francisco with a load of 500 barrels of Monongahela whiskey and coal, the sinking of the ship was news throughout the United States.

== Wreck ==
The shipwreck lay under the islands' shore, in front of the Farallon Island Light, with her cargo of whiskey worth around $10 million in the 1920s. In 1929, there was an attempt by Captain T. H. P. Whitelaw to salvage the sunken whisky from the wreck of the Bremen, however, he was prevented by the Prohibition Act due to Prohibition effective since February 9, 1919. Years later, Whitelaw tried to request permission from the U.S. government to extract whiskey but was never able to obtain it.
