= Co Breman =

Dutch painter

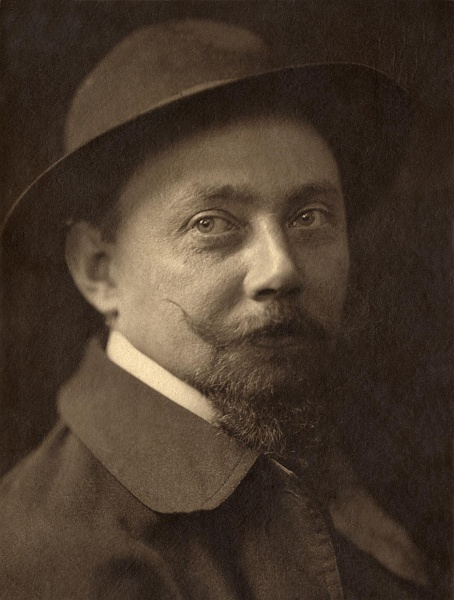
Co Breman (c.1895)

Ahazueros Jacobus Breman, known as Co (7 December 1865, Zwolle - 18 November 1938, Laren) was a Dutch painter. He specialized in landscapes, farms and interior scenes, with figures, and was one of the first Pointillist painters in the Netherlands.

== Biography ==
His father, Willem Fredrik Breman (1829-1875), owned a carpentry and blacksmithing shop. He had five siblings, including Evert Breman, a well-known architect. After his father's death, he was placed with guardians who encouraged his artistic inclinations. His first formal lessons were at a local art school operated by Jan Derk Huibers, who worked in traditional styles. In 1889, he went to Brussels, where he found work doing decorative painting while he studied at the Academie Royal des Beaux Arts. In 1893, he spent some time in Paris.

He then went to Amsterdam, where he joined the Guild of Saint Luke and Arti et Amicitiae. In 1897, based on the recommendations of his associates, he settled in Gooi. Then, he and several friends opened studios in an old brewery in Blaricum; becoming well known locally for their Bohemian lifestyles. Two years later, he had become successful enough to purchase a house, where their behavior became even more riotous. They were also regular visitors to a former pub owned by Jan Hamdorff, a hotelier, Alderman and, most importantly, art dealer, who opened a gallery there in 1913.

He was the secretary of a local painter's club called "De Tien" (The Ten), that presented regular exhibitions. He also showed his works in Madrid, Berlin, London, San Francisco and Glasgow.

From 1913, he and his wife, the artist Lizzy Schouten lived in Laren, where they had a daughter. From 1921 until his death, he was President of the "Kunstenaarsvereniging Laren-Blaricum" (Artists' Society). A street in Laren is named after him. Most of his major works may be seen at the Frans Hals Museum, the Dordrechts Museum and the Singer Museum.

== Selected paintings ==
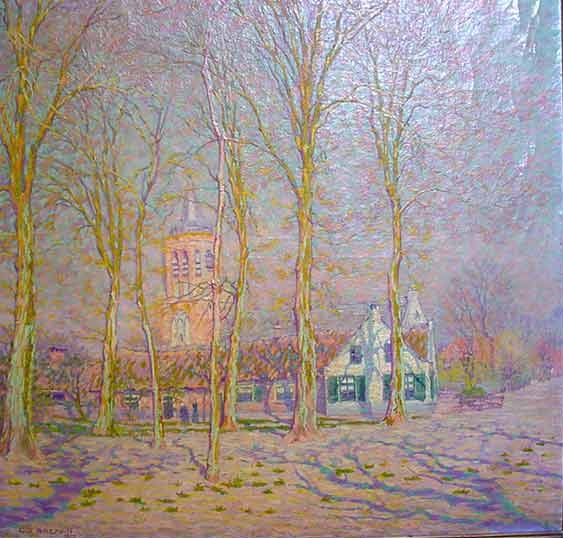
The Reformed Church
in Laren

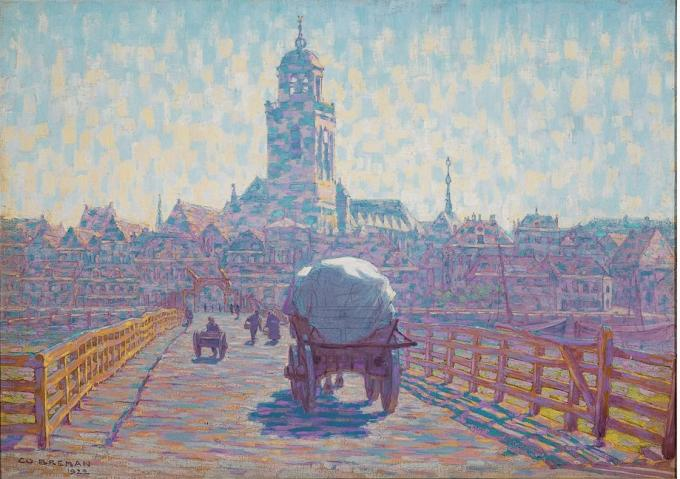
View of Deventer

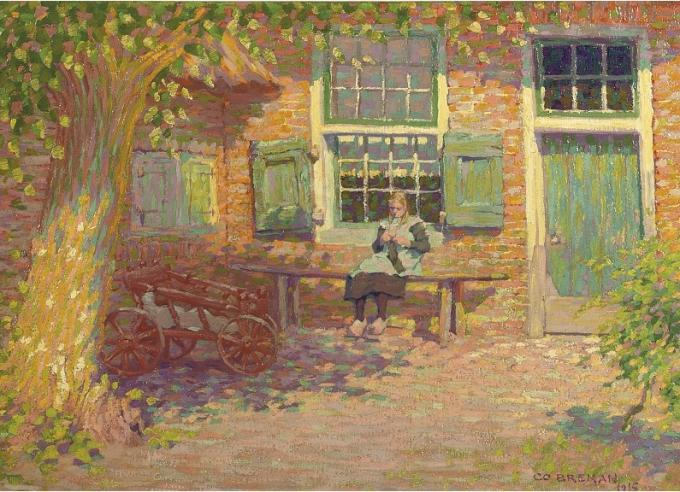
Woman at a Farm in Gooi

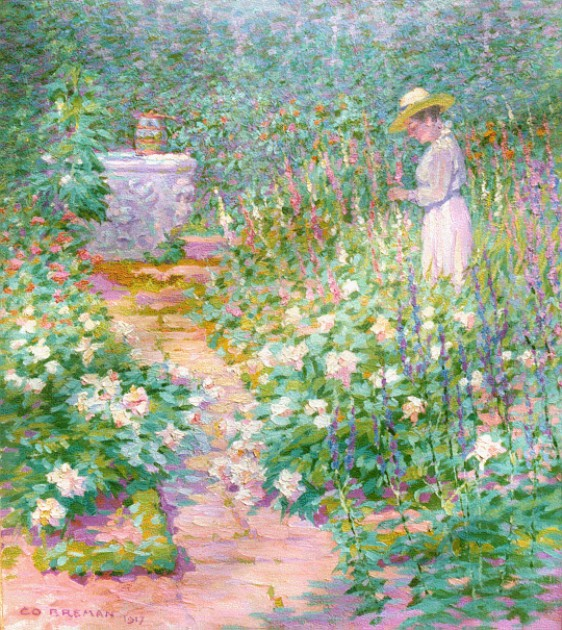
In the Garden
