= Barra Vieja Beach =

Beach in Guerrero, Mexico

The Barra Vieja Beach is a beach on the Mexican Pacific coast, located in the Acapulco de Juárez municipality, within the state of Guerrero. It is one of the main tourist attractions of the port due to its cuisine (including the famous Pescado a la talla) and for its beautiful sunsets. The beach extends for several kilometers along the coast and has a width of between 50 and 110 meters. The sand is fine and light grayish unlike the central area, the sea is open so the waves are more intense.

== Toponym ==
The area of Barra Vieja receives its name due to the formations of sand banks and sediments that accumulate at the mouth of the Papagayo River at the sea.

== Location ==
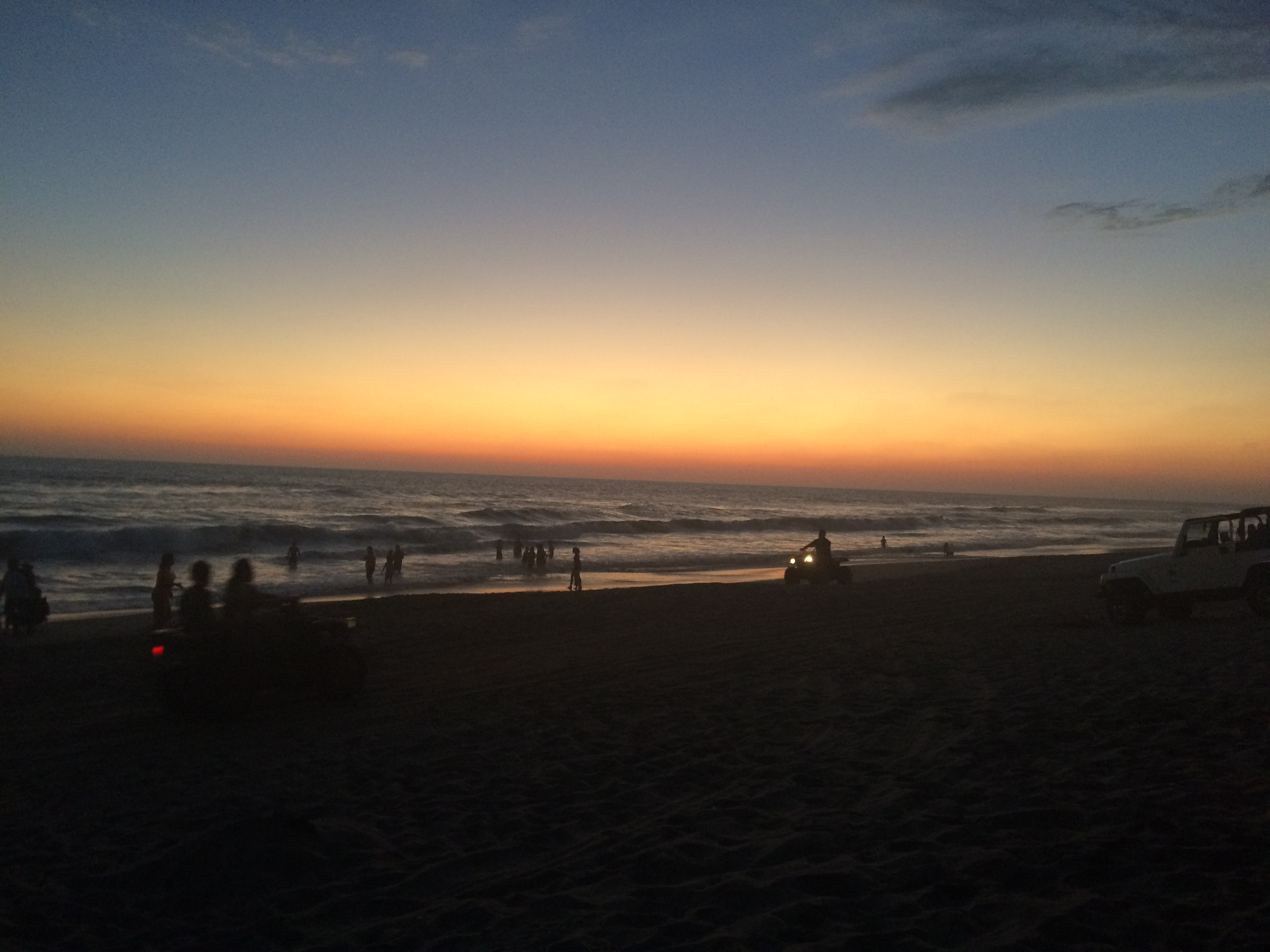
Visitors walking on the beach during sunset

It is 30 kilometers east of the city of Acapulco, in the Punta Diamante area, after the Acapulco International Airport.

As a tourist destination it has a diverse range of leisure activities such as horseback riding, all-terrain vehicle rides, surfing, masseurs, tasting regional sweets and others.
