= Bremen High School =

Bremen High School may refer to various schools in the United States:

- Bremen High School (Georgia), Bremen, Georgia
- Bremen High School (Midlothian, Illinois), Midlothian, Illinois
- Bremen High School (Bremen, Indiana), Bremen, Indiana

== See also ==
- New Bremen High School, New Bremen, Ohio
