= Joseph Teixeira de Mattos =

Dutch painter

Joseph Teixeira de Mattos (1892–1971), was a Dutch watercolor painter and pastellist who made drawings wherever he went. A large collection of his drawings is in the Teylers Museum.

== Biography ==
Teixeira was born in Amsterdam, where he became a member of Arti et Amicitiae in 1934 and began drawing animals at Artis. In 1931 he moved to Paris, and for the war years he moved to Pornic in Brittany, where he remained until he died. The Teylers museum had an exhibition of his work in 2004.

== Early career ==
Joseph Teixeira de Mattos shared his name with his uncle, who was a sculptor. He was the elder of the two sons of Jacob Teixeira de Mattos and Abigael Lopes Cardozo. Joseph showed promise as an artist while still at school. When he was only 13, he enrolled on a year-long class designed for children to train them to become art teachers. Graduation from an esteemed course did not, however, bring Joseph success as an artist, and he had to abandon the teaching career to pursue a career as an artist. During this problematic phase in his career, he received financial support from Joseph Mendes da Costa and Samuel Jessurun de Mesquita.

Teixeira de Mattos began working independently in 1916. His earliest works were mostly self-portraits made in and around Amsterdam. His family members became recurrent characters in his works. He also made several chalk drawings of the Waag on the Nieuwmarkt. Teixeira de Mattos was first exhibited in 1917 at the Galerie Walrecht.

== Motif ==
Teixeira de Mattos frequently drew animals. Crocodiles were particularly common in his works. He was known to be very diligent and obsessed with technical mastery of drawing materials.
