= Kees Smout =

Dutch sculptor (1876–1961)

Aloysius Cornelis (Kees) Smout (30 April 1876 in Bergen op Zoom - 24 August 1961 in Breda) was a Dutch sculptor.

== Life and work ==
Smout studied at the Rijksnormaalschool (1895-1899) led by Willem Molkenboer and Jan Derk Huibers and then attended the Rijksakademie van beeldende kunsten in Amsterdam. There, he was a student of Ludwig Jünger, Bart van Hove and Ferdinand Leenhoff. In 1901, he won the second prize in the Dutch Prix de Rome in the sculpture category, three years later he was awarded the first prize. This enabled him to make a study trip to France and Italy.

After this he made his way back to the Netherlands and made building models, Christian religious statues, and more. Smout later taught drawing between 1901-1904 and decorative painting between 1909-1914 at the Teekenschool voor Kunstambachten in Amsterdam, modeling lessons at the Burgeravondschool in Utrecht between 1904-1905, and lessons in modeling the human figure at the Royal Academy of Arts in The Hague between 1914-1917. His students included Piet Spijker, Jan Kriege, and A.Th. Boon.

In 1930, he won a gold medal at the Arti exhibition. He was also a member of the Arti et Amicitiae artist association in Amsterdam and the Artists' association Sint Lucas.

== Some works ==
- 1912-1913 terracotta sculpture for the Amsterdam Stock Exchange
- 1912-24 tympanum in construction ceramics for the Amsterdam Stock Exchange
- 1914 Grave monument of Piet van Nek in The New Ooster cemetery in Amsterdam. Protected as a national monument.
- 1914-16 architectural sculpture at Peek & Cloppenburg, Amsterdam
- 1926 Sacred Heart statue in Etten. Protected as a national monument.
- 1927 Sacred Heart statue in Oud Gastel.
- 1929-1930 memorial stone JJ. Schofaerts, chairman of ACOB, Kamperfoelieweg 15-17, Amsterdam
- 1930-1931 schoolhouse building sculpture, Cornelis Dirkszstraat (street), Amsterdam
- 1932 Saint Joseph for the OL. Lady of Perpetual Help Church in Santpoort-Noord
- 1933 Relief marathoners on the Marathonway in Amsterdam
- 1933 building sculpture, altar and communion rails for the Sint-Jozefkerk (St. Joseph's Church) (Zwaagdijk-Oost)
- 1935 facade statue of Augustine on Augustine Church, Amstelveenseweg/Kalfjeslaan, Amsterdam
- 1946 Monument to Antonius Mathijsen in Budel
