= Laren School =

Art movement

The Laren School is the name of an art colony located in the Dutch village Laren, in the Gooi near Hilversum. The artists of this offshoot of the Hague School chose the inhabitants of Laren and the surrounding landscape as the subject of their art.

Discovered by painter Jozef Israëls, the area around Laren School was distinguished by its unspoiled beauty and diversity of landscape, and was considered ideally situated by many members of the Hague School. After 1898, it was rediscovered by young artists known as the second generation of the Laren School, their work extending far into the 20th century. This colony of artists is significant in Dutch Impressionism, being seen as part of this international movement. The ideas fostered in the area found their way to the Modernist art movement.

== The first generation of the Laren School ==
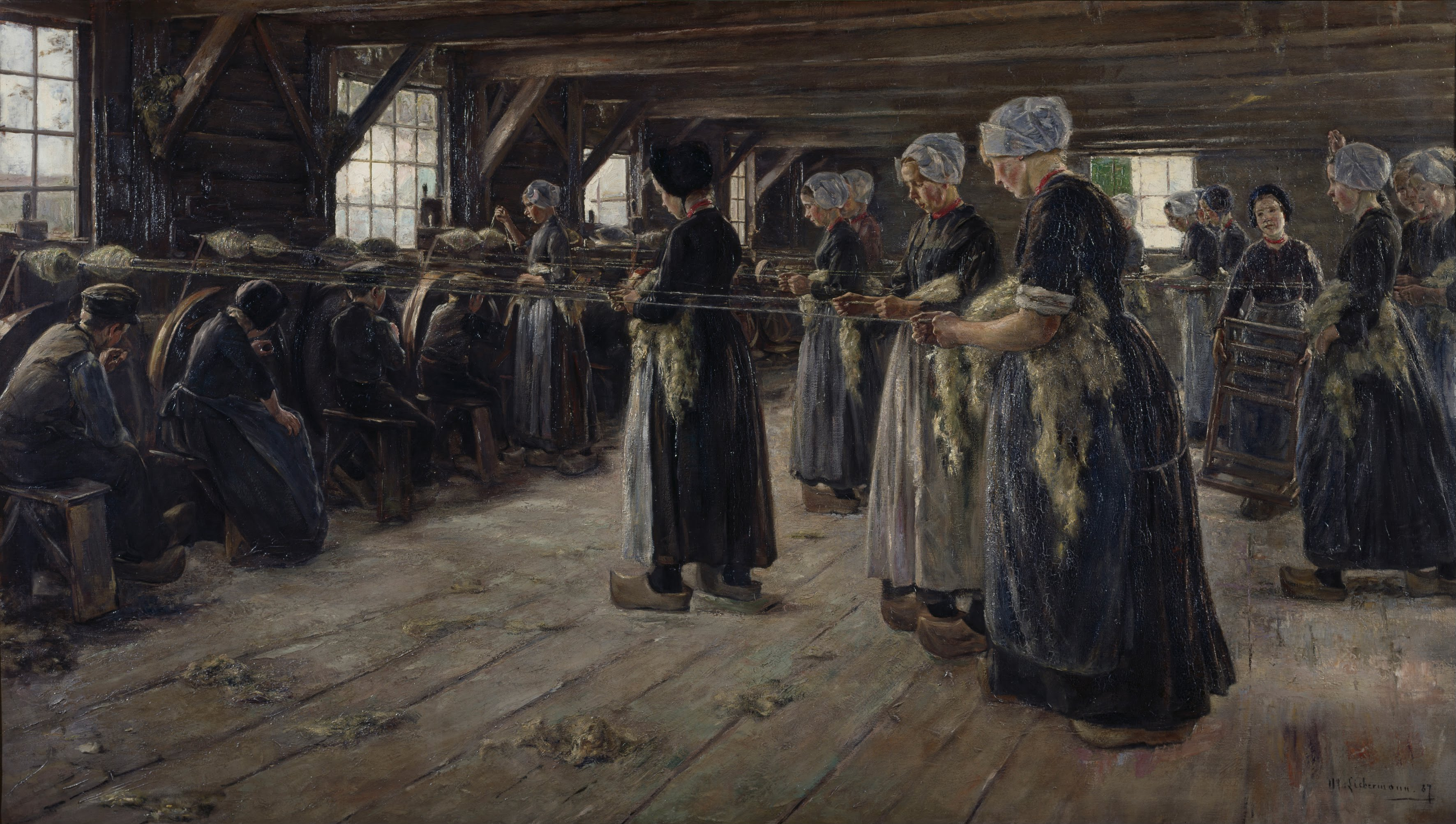
Max Liebermann (1887): Flax Barn at Laren .

The industrialisation of Rotterdam, Amsterdam and other regions of the Netherlands affected landscapes that had remained untouched for centuries. Many of these landscapes disappeared, and with them, the inspiration for earlier landscape and genre painting.

After 15 years of fame, from 1855 to 1870, the artists of the Oosterbeek School were looking for a new place to paint. Around 1870, the painter Jozef Israëls discovered the village of Laren. He visited often with his son, Isaac, whom he instructed in outdoor painting. His enthusiasm for Laren, and the surrounding landscape and agricultural activity, was infectious, and other artists from the Pulchri Studio began to join him. Albert Neuhuys and Anton Mauve were the first to follow Israëls in 1877 and in 1882. Later, Hein Kever, Willem Steelink, Hendrik Valkenburg, Wally Moes, Etha Fles, Arina Hugenholtz and Tony Offermans Jan Hendrik Weissenbruch, Willem Roelofs, and Max Liebermann (the first foreign painter at the Laren School and an old friend of Israël) came to work in Laren. Thus, the Laren School as an artist colony was born. Some of these painters settled in the region; their Laren-inspired works were shown to the public at the Pulchri Studio and affiliated galleries.

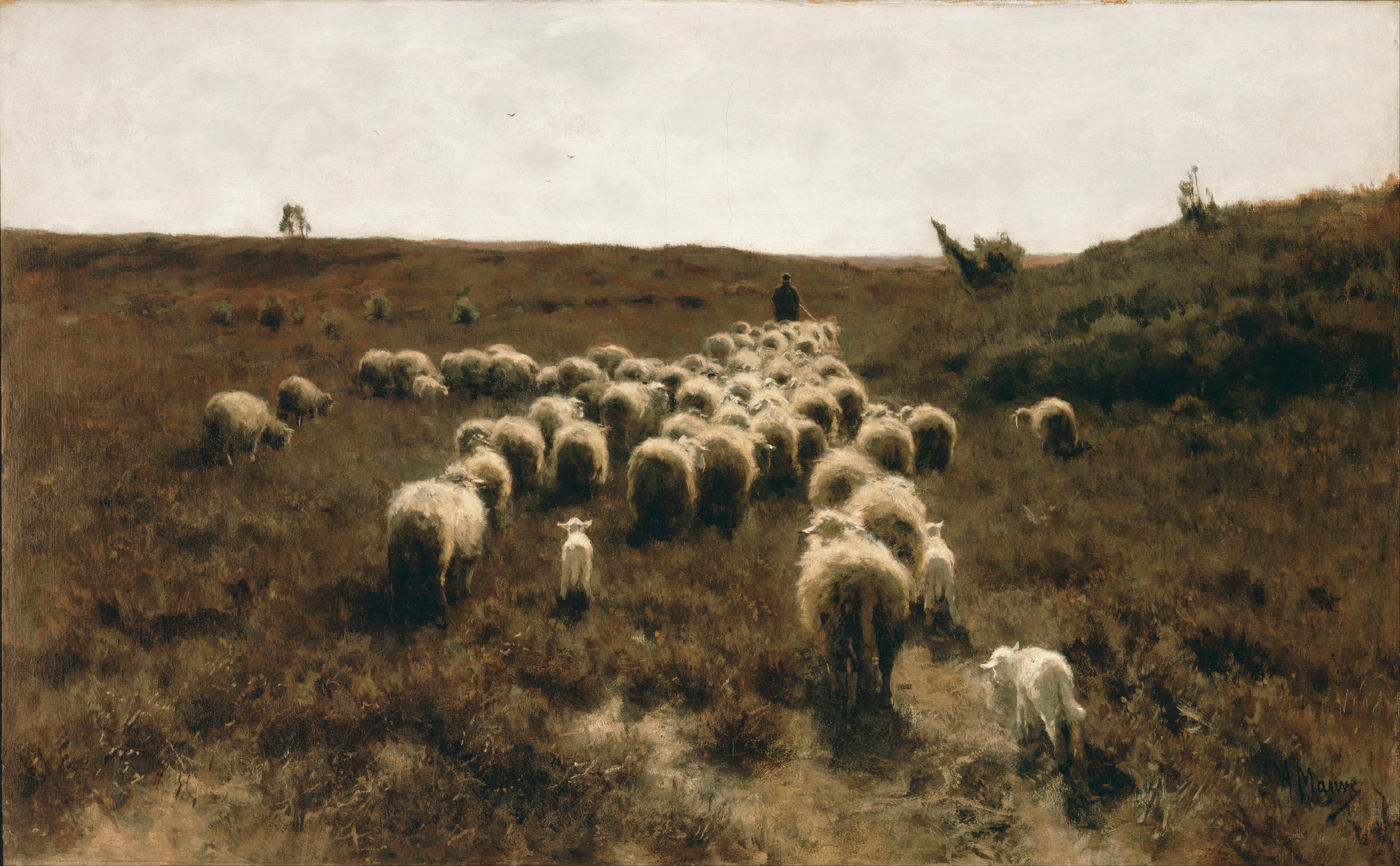
Anton Mauve (1886-87): The Return of the Flock, Laren - Rijksmuseum Amsterdam.

Neuhuys concentrated on farm life as a genre subject, but the others turned to the landscape. Art historians describe this as the Laren Style, which is regarded as part of the Hague School.

Around 1885, the first colony ceased to produce new work based on Laren and its environs.

== The second generation of the Laren School ==
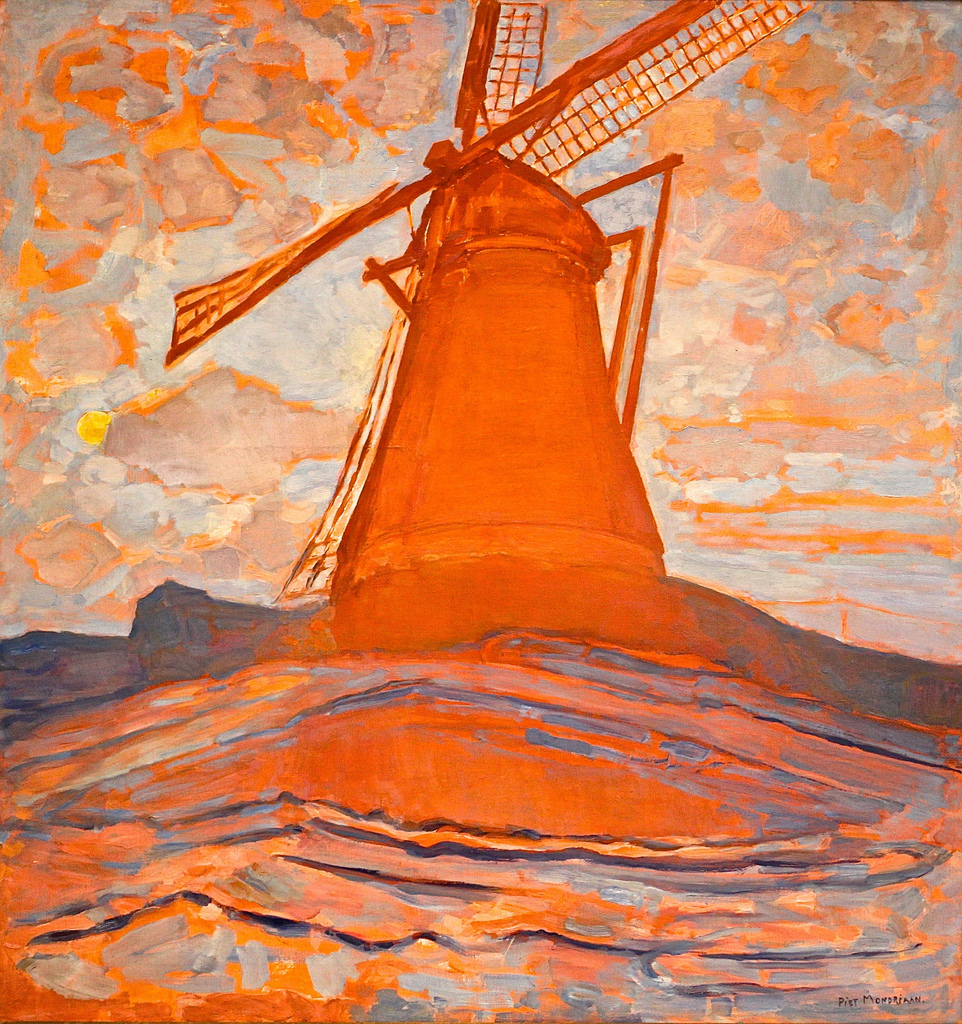
Piet Mondriaan (1917): The Windmill - Stedelijk Museum, Amsterdam

Around 1898, Laren was rediscovered by a group of young painters who gave new life to the Laren Style school of painting for the next 40 years, including nl:Otto van Tussenbroek, Evert Pieters, Bernard de Hoog, Hendrik Theodorus de Court Onderwater, nl:Andre Broedelet, Salomon Garf, Franz Deutmann, Lammert van der Tonge, nl:Jaap Dooijewaard and Bernard Pothast. Most of these were genre painters in the agricultural tradition, like Neuhuys. However some were landscape painters, notably nl:Cornelis Vreedenburgh, nl:Gerrit van Blaaderen and nl:Frans Langeveld.

The second generation of the Laren School diverged, one group following the traditions of the Hague School while the rest painted in the new style of Impressionism, embracing modernity with an enthusiasm now considered typical of the Netherlands.

In 1903, under the initiative of August Johannes le Gras (1864–1915), the Gooische Painters Association, "De Tien" (The Ten), was founded. This group organized exhibitions across the country to create new opportunities for the work of its members. The Ten included nl:Derk Meeles, nl:Toon de Jong, nl:David Schulman and nl:Emanuel van Beever.

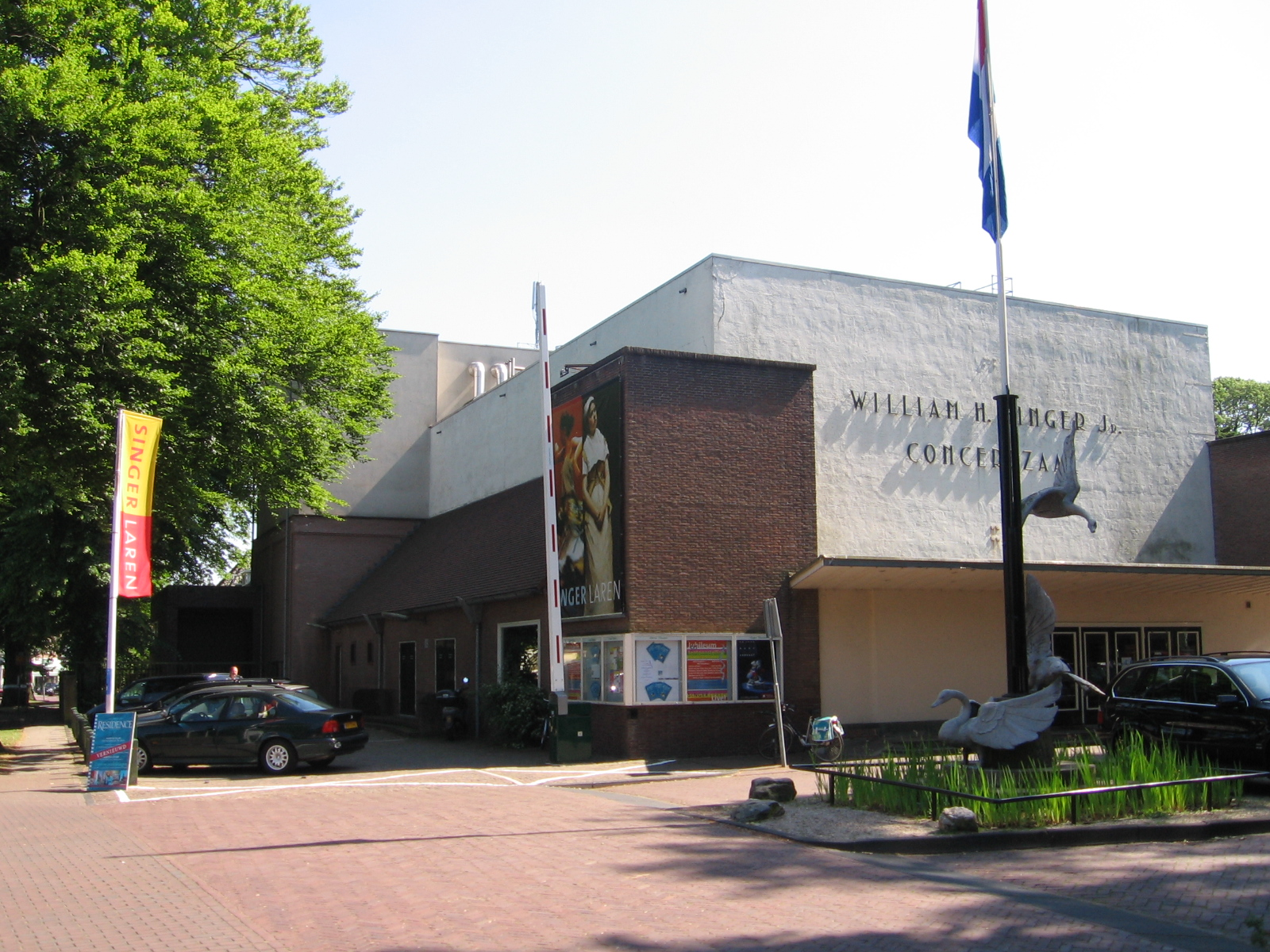
The Singer Museum of Laren.

William Henry Singer, an American painter and art collector, came to Laren in 1901. In 1911, he built a villa called De Wilde Zwanen (The Wild Swans) which, after World War II, was converted into the Singer Museum and concert hall.

At De Wilde Zwanen, painters such as Co Breman and Ferdinand Hart Nibbrig differed from the mainstream of Impressionism, painting in the style of Pointillism and Luminism. nl:Johan Coenraad Heyen Brock specialized in the representation of factories. For modernists, like Piet Mondriaan, Jan Sluyters and Leo Gestel, this studio and its location were significant in the direction they took in their art.

In 1921, the Association of Visual Artists, Laren, Blaricum, was founded by Co Breman. In 1935, the Gooische Painters Association fractured, and the members formed several distinct groups. August Johannes le Gras specialised in African landscapes and animals, Jan Pieter Veth in portraits, nl:Douwe Komter in still life.

Today, the Singer Museum exhibits works of the Laren School.

== About the name ==
From art collectors and authors, the term is often used for all painters active in Laren, and as shorthand for the continuation of the Hague School and the Oosterbeek School. Several founders of this artist colony — Jozef Israëls and his son, Isaac, along with Albert Neuhuys and Anton Mauve — were already known as Hague painters.

This artists of the Laren School are linked together by the relationship between their ideas of art, style and techniques. In Laren, the countryside was the main theme of the landscape painters. Therefore, the term 'Laren' applies primarily as a place of landscape painting. The lightening of color, by adding gold yellow, red and blue, is essential to the Laren School. Another striking feature of Laren School paintings is the romantic view of social life in this tough region of Gooiland.

== Shown painters in Singer Museum, Laren ==
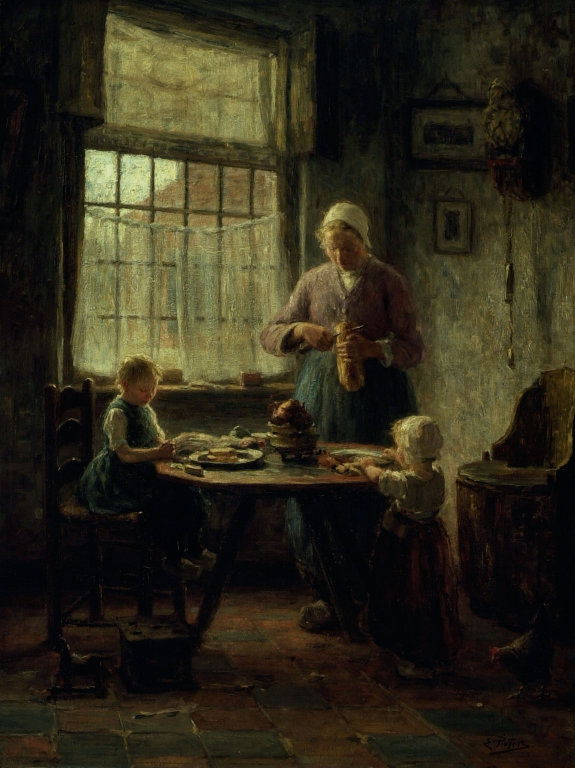
Evert Pieters (about 1890): A Family Meal - private collection.

- Marius Bauer (1867–1932)
- Johannes Bosboom (1817–1891)
- George Hendrik Breitner (1857–1923)
- Arthur Henri Christiaan Briët (1867–1939)
- Franz Wilhelm Maria Deutmann (1867–1915)
- Paul Joseph Constantin Gabriël (1828–1903)
- August Johannes le Gras (1864–1915)
- Hein Kever (1854–1922)
- Jacobus Hendricus Maris (1837–1899)
- Johannes Albert Neuhuys (1844–1914)
- Anton Lodewijk George Offermans (1854–1911)
- Ferdinand Gustaaf Willem Oldewelt (1857–1935)
- David Oyens (1842–1902)
- Evert Pieters (1856–1932)
- Paul Philip Rink (1862–1903)
- Cornelius Rudolf Hendrik Spoor (1867–1928)
- Emmanuel Ernest Geradus van der Ven (1866–1944)
- Jan Visser (1856–1938)
- Jan Hendrik Weissenbruch (1824–1903)
