= Franz Deutmann =

Dutch painter and photographer

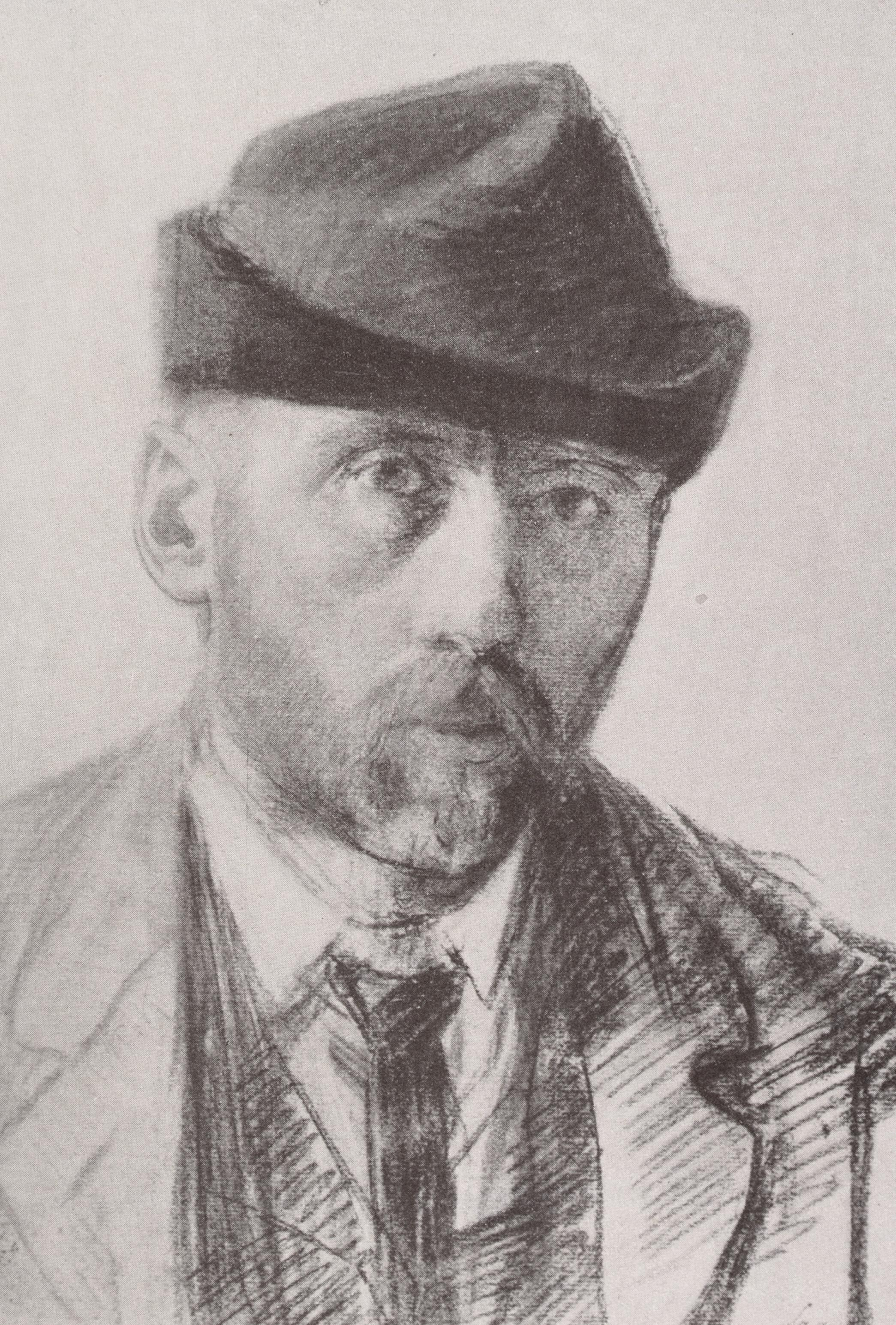
Self-portrait (c.1900)

Franz Wilhelm Maria Deutmann (27 March 1867 in Zwolle – 18 July 1915 in Blaricum) was a Dutch painter and photographer. He was a member of Arti et Amicitiae and is considered to be part of the Laren School, an offshoot of the Hague School, which is an independent part of the international movement of impressionism.

== Biography ==
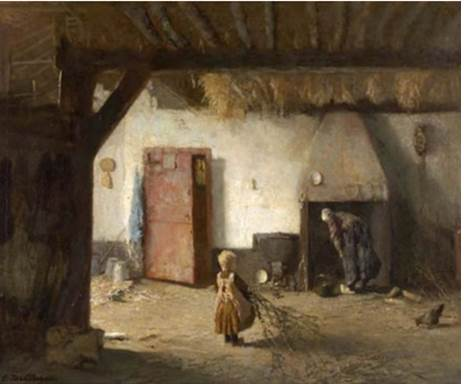
Tending the Fire

His father was Franz Wilhelm Heinrich Deutmann (1840–1906), a well known photographer. He studied painting with Jan Derk Huibers, a genre artist. After a brief stay in Germany in 1884, he enrolled at the Royal Academy of Fine Arts (Antwerp) from 1884 to 1887. During his studies at the academy he was a student of Prof. Charles Verlat.

In 1891, due to financial difficulties, he returned to Amsterdam and took a position in his father's photography studio. By 1896, he had established himself as an artist and opened his own studio. Many of his works from this period have a sad feeling to them, and it is possible that he was suffering from depression.

In 1892 he moved to the artists' colony in Laren. Plein air painting in the company of his fellow artists seems to have cheered him up. His portraits and figures were more colorful and lightly rendered, although his interiors still had a touch of melancholy. After a few years his depression returned and he stayed in his studio, doing still lifes of flowers.

His work was not as successful as most of his associates in the Laren School. After 1903, he went back to Amsterdam, but stayed there for only one year. Then he retired to Blaricum and lived in a house named "Heide-Weide" (Heide Meadows), which was later occupied by several other well-known artists and writers. After a long illness he died there in 1915, aged only forty-eight.

Franz Deutmann was a member of Arti et Amicitiae and the Kunstenaarsvereniging Sint Lucas.

His brother, Herman Deutmann, was also a photographer; well known for his portraits of the Royal Family.

== Museums with collections of his works ==
- Amsterdam Museum
- Rijksmuseum Amsterdam
- Stedelijk Museum, Amsterdam
- Groninger Museum, Groningen
- Gemeentemuseum Den Haag, The Hague
- Singer Museum, Laren

== Exhibitions ==
- 1903 Stedelijke internationale tentoonstelling van kunstwerken van levende meesters, Stedelijk Museum, Amsterdam.
- 1907 Stedelijke internationale tentoonstelling van kunstwerken van levende meesters, Stedelijk Museum, Amsterdam.
- 1912 Stedelijke internationale tentoonstelling van kunstwerken van levende meesters, Stedelijk Museum, Amsterdam.
- 1914 Tentoonstelling van werken door Franz Deutman: Laren, Rotterdam.
- 1916 Tentoonstelling van werken van Franz Deutman, Arti et Amicitiae, Amsterdam.
- 1917 Tentoonstelling. Atelier Franz Deutman, Amsterdam.
- 2005–2006 Groepstentoonstelling: Onstuitbare verzamelaar J.F.S. Esser : Mondriaan, Breitner, Sluijters e.a., Singer Museum, Laren

== Gallery ==
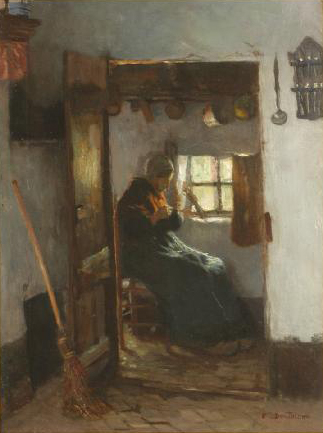
Quiet Moments

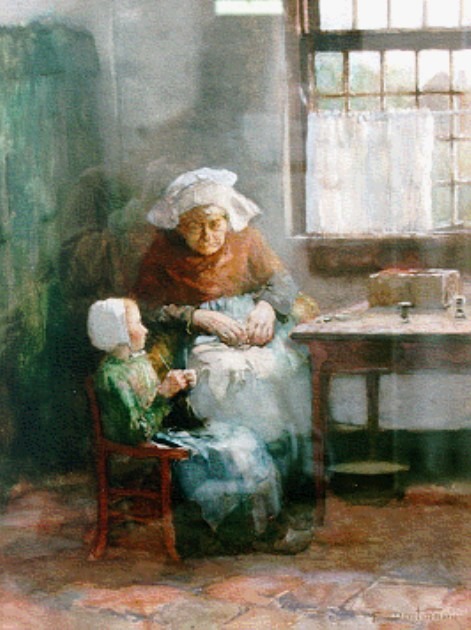
Knitting lesson (1895)-private collection.

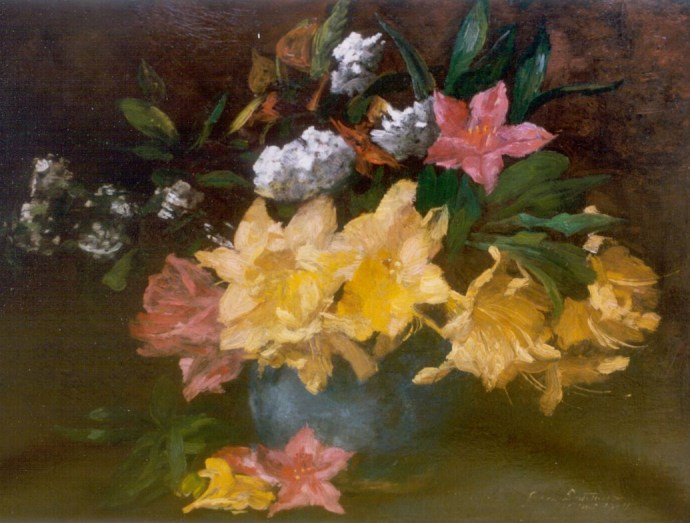
Still-life with flowers (1914)-private collection.

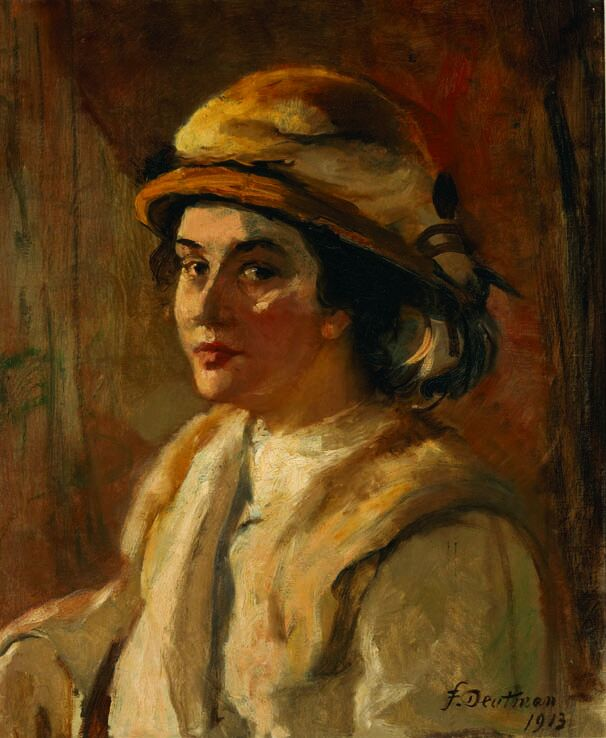
Portrait of a young lady (1913)-private collection.

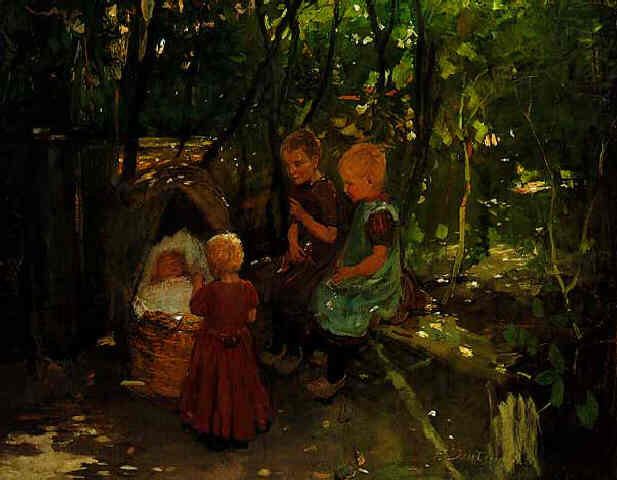
The Center of Attraction

== Biographies ==
=== Catalogs ===
- Arti et Amicitiae, (1916): Catalog van werken van Franz Deutman, Publisher Arti et Amicitiae.
- Catalog Muller + Co. (1917): Atelier Franz Deutman, Amsterdam.
- Tentoonstelling van werken van Franz Deutman: Laren, (N.H.) Unger + Van Mens, Kunstzalen, 1914, Rotterdam.

=== Books ===
- Denninger-Schreuder, Carole (2003): Schilders van Laren, Thoth - Uitgeverij, ISBN 978-9-068-68327-1.
- Heyting, Lien (2004): De Wereld in Een Dorp, - schilders, schrijvers en wereldverbeteraars in Laren en Blaricum, Meulenhoff, ISBN 978-9-029-04856-9.
- Jonkman, Mayken; Raad, Jacqueline de (2005): Onstuitbare verzamelaar J.F.S. Esser: Mondriaan, Breitner, Sluijters e.a., Waanders, Zwolle, ISBN 978-90-400-9123-0.
- Koenraads, Jan P. (1985): Laren en zijn Schilders, Boekhandel Juli Kluvers, ISBN 978-9-071-16002-8.

=== Encyclopedia ===
- Scheen, Pieter A. (1981): Lexicon Nederlandse Beeldende Kunstenaars 1750-1950. 2 Volumes, 's-Gravenhage (The Hague), Kunsthandel Pieter A. Scheen N.V., p. 115.
