= Overtoomse Veld =

Coordinates: 52°21′48.01″N 4°50′18.1″E

- Neighborhood of Amsterdam
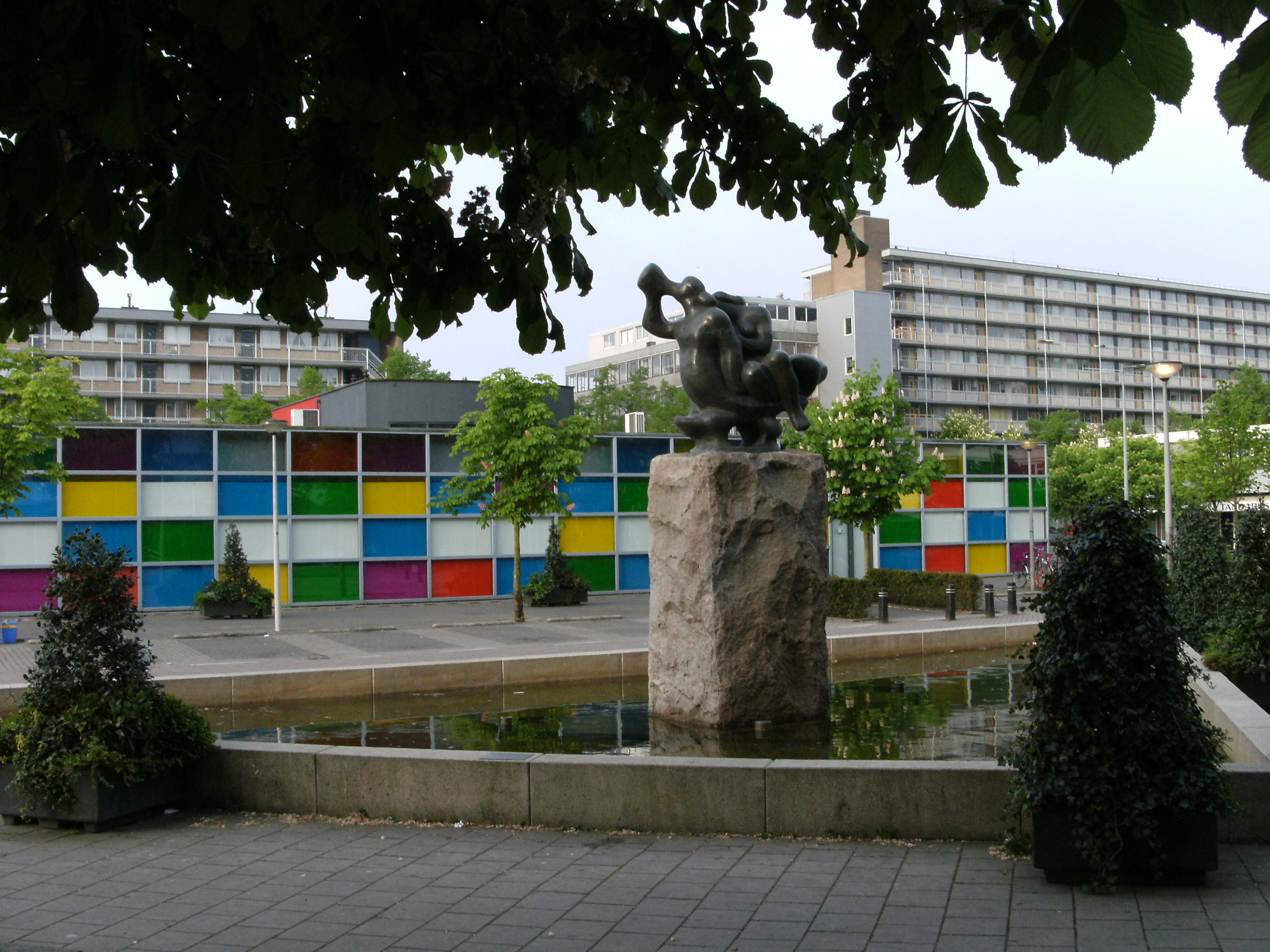
- August Allebéplein in the Overtoomse Veld
- Interactive map of Overtoomse Veld
- Country: Netherlands
- Province: North Holland
- COROP: Amsterdam
- Time zone: UTC+1 (CET)

Overtoomse Veld is a neighborhood of Amsterdam, Netherlands. It is named for the Overtoomse Sluis, which was an old portage point dating from the 14th century on a major cargo route to and from Amsterdam at the junction of two waterschap areas, Hoogheemraadschap van Rijnland and Hoogheemraadschap van Amstelland.

In neighborhood Overtoomse Veld-Noord the following streets are named after Dutch painters from the 19th and 20th century:

- August Allebé
- Louis Apol
- Marius Bauer
- Antoon Derkinderen
- Jan Eisenloeffel
- Johan Greive
- Henk Henriët
- Johannes Hilverdink
- Theo van Hoytema
- Johan Jongkind
- Karel Klinkenberg
- Willem van Konijnenburg
- Chris Lebeau
- Charles Leickert
- Jan Mankes
- Wally Moes
- Piet Mondriaan
- Willem Nakken
- Ferdinand Hart Nibbrig
- Willem Nuijen
- Johan Thorn Prikker
- Suze Robertson
- Willem Roelofs
- Willy Sluiter
- Jan Sluijters
- Lawrence Alma-Tadema
- Jan Toorop
- Jan Veth
- Jan Voerman
- Anthonie Waldorp
- Hendrik Werkman

In neighborhood Overtoomse Veld-Midden the following streets are named after philosophers:

- Rudolf Carnap
- Gottlob Frege
- Gerrit Mannoury
- Ludwig Wittgenstein
- Wilhelmina of the Netherlands

For the Delflandpleinbuurt area in Overtoomse Veld-Zuid, the names come from places in Delfland:

- Abtswoude
- Delfland
- Hook of Holland (Hoek van Holland)
- Honselersdijk
- Kwintsheul
- De Lier
- Loosduinen
- Maassluis
- Naaldwijk
- Nootdorp
- Overschie
- Poeldijk
- Rijswijk
- Rodenrijs
- Schipluiden
- Vlaardingen
- Voorburg
- Westerlee
