= Willem Steelink Jr. =

Dutch painter

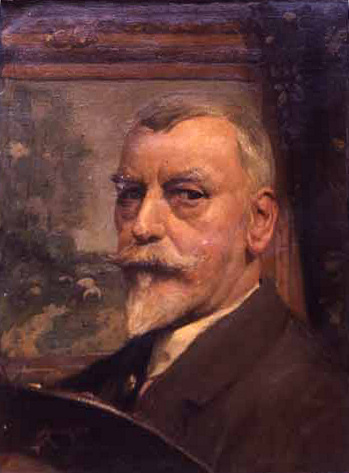
Self-portrait (c.1900)

Willem Steelink Jr. (16 July 1856, Amsterdam – 27 November 1928, Voorburg) was a Dutch painter and graphic artist, associated with the Laren School.

== Biography ==
His father, also named Willem, was a well-known painter and engraver who gave him his first lessons. From 1873 to 1879, he studied with Barend Wijnveld at the Rijksakademie, then went to Antwerp, where he studied at the Royal Academy of Fine Arts with Charles Verlat.

He initially focused on portraits, genre scenes and historical paintings, done in a style influenced by the Romantic style of his father. In 1880, he visited the moors around Gooi and began to paint in the style of the Hague School. Together with his friend, Hein Kever, he spent several summers in Laren where he came under the influence of the Laren School, inspired by Anton Mauve. He continued to move about, living in Hilversum, Scherpenzeel and Laren before settling in The Hague. The picturesque village of Heeze became one of his favorite places to work. Sheep, and their shepherds, was his favorite subject.

He was also known for his graphic work and etchings, and made copies of famous works by Jozef Israëls and Johannes Bosboom. Later, he did illustrations, mostly for historical works and children's books, but also for an edition of the New Testament in Sundanese.

His works were popular and sold well in Germany, England and Canada. He was a member of many artistic organizations, including Arti et Amicitiae and the Pulchri Studio, and received the Belgian Order of the Crown and the French Order of Saint Lazarus. He was also an officer of the Order of Orange-Nassau. In 1921, he moved to Voorburg, where he died. The largest collection of his works may be seen at the Gemeentemuseum in The Hague.

== Selected paintings ==
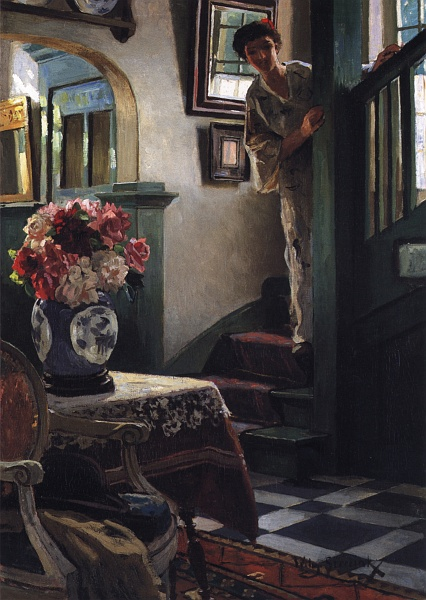
Joyous Welcome (1916)

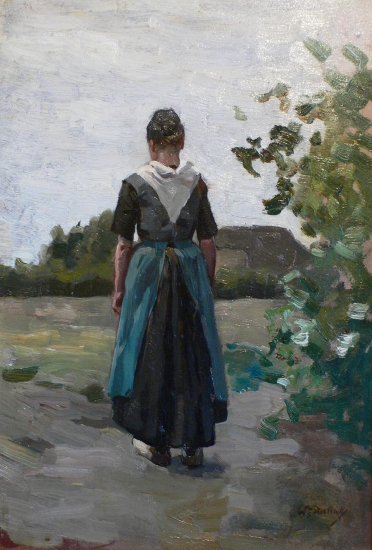
Peasant Woman (c.1900)

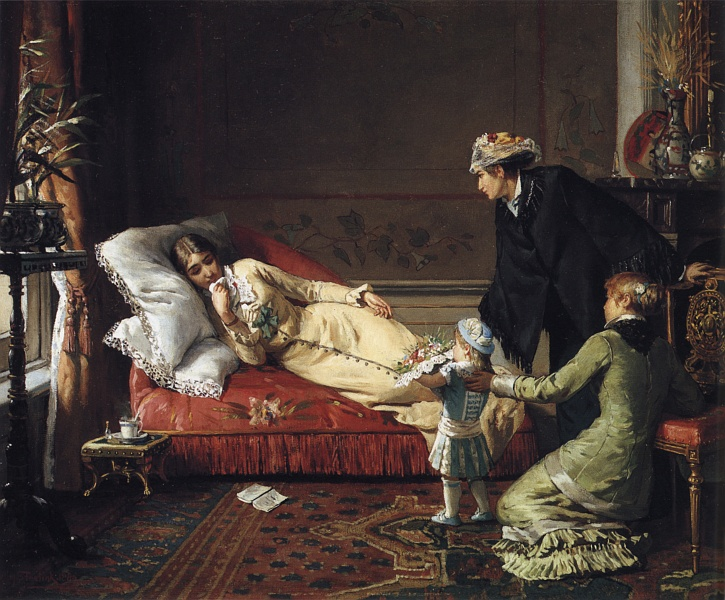
Unexpected Visitors (1880)

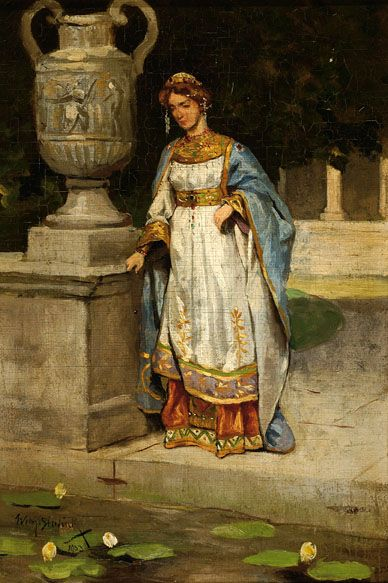
Roman Woman (c.1895)
