= Evert Jan Ligtelijn =

Dutch painter

- Born: 13 November 1893; Amsterdam, Netherlands
- Died: 26 December 1975 (aged 82); Laren, North Holland, Netherlands
- Known for: Painting
- Movement: Impressionism

Evert Jan Ligtelijn, pseudonym Luciénte, (13 November 1893, in Amsterdam – 26 December 1975, Laren) was a Dutch painter.
