= Arina Hugenholtz =

Dutch painter

- Born: 20 September 1848; Cillaarshoek, Netherlands
- Died: 4 April 1934 (aged 85); Laren, Netherlands
- Known for: Landscape and genre painting
- Movement: Laren School

Arina Hugenholtz (20 September 1848 – 4 April 1934) was a Dutch painter. She is known for her landscape and genre paintings.

== Biography ==
Hugenholtz was born 20 September 1848 in Cillaarshoek. She attended Royal Academy of Art at The Hague and the State Academy of Fine Arts in Amsterdam. She studied with Anton Mauve.

Hugenholtz exhibited her work at the Palace of Fine Arts at the 1893 World's Columbian Exposition in Chicago, Illinois.

In 1894 she settled in Laren, where she had a studio built and she was associated with the Laren School

Hugenholtz died 4 April 1934 in Laren.

Her works are in the Singer Museum in Laren and the Frans Hals Museum in Haarlem.

== Gallery ==
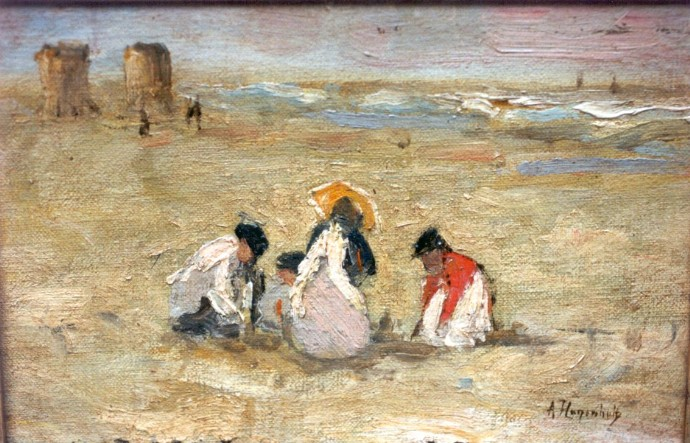
Children on the beach circa 1920
