= Wally Moes =

Dutch painter

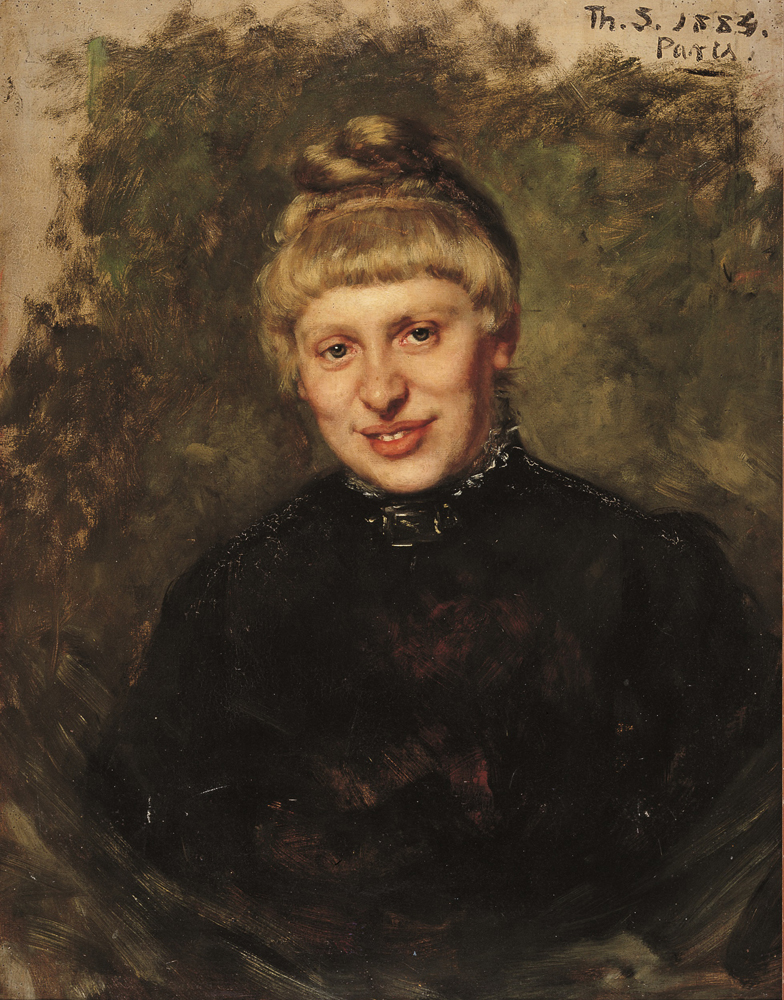
- Portrait of Wally Moes by Thérèse Schwartze, 1884
- Born: Wilhelmina Walburga Moes; 16 October 1856; Amsterdam, Netherlands
- Died: 6 November 1918 (aged 62); Laren, North Holland, Netherlands
- Known for: Painting

Wilhelmina Walburga "Wally" Moes (16 October 1856 – 6 November 1918) was a Dutch genre painter and writer. She specialized in pictures of children.

== Biography ==
Moes was born in Amsterdam where she attended the Rijksacademie voor Beeldende Kunsten in Amsterdam and followed lessons under August Allebé in the "ladies' class", together with the pupils Arina Hugenholtz, Alida Loder and Antoinette Zimmerman. In 1878 she left with a few other pupils after their petition to dismiss a few professors was refused. She returned in 1880 when Allebé became director. She remained on friendly terms with him and they continued correspondence after she graduated.

In the summer of 1880 Moes met the portrait painter Thérèse Schwartze who introduced her to her network of friends and patrons. After a short stay in Germany she returned to Amsterdam and graduated officially in 1884. That January she travelled with Schwartze to Paris where they worked on their submissions for the Paris Salon. Only one of her paintings was accepted and it was hung very high up on a wall. In May the painters returned to Amsterdam and Moes began her own workshop in the home of her mother on the P.C. Hooftstraat. That same summer she went to the art colony Laren for the first time where she met the painters Anton Mauve, Max Liebermann and Jan Veth.

Though she was not an etcher, she received an invitation in 1885 to make a submission for the newly formed Dutch Etcher's Club and submitted an etching for several years after that to their yearly magazine. In this period she became a member of Arti et Amicitiae and sold a painting to Museum Boijmans van Beuningen. Moes exhibited her work at the Palace of Fine Arts at the 1893 World's Columbian Exposition in Chicago, Illinois.

In 1898 she moved to Laren where she lived in Hotel Hamdorff, a meeting place for artists. In 1908 she had to move out due to arthritis and gave up painting and began to write stories, living in a converted home that Veth had helped her to set up in Laren. Her decades of work specializing in everyday scenes of Laren's people earned her a place in the town's history: A local prize for volunteer work is named after her.

Moes died in Laren and Jan Veth read her eulogy. Her autobiography wasn't published until 1961.

== Selected paintings ==
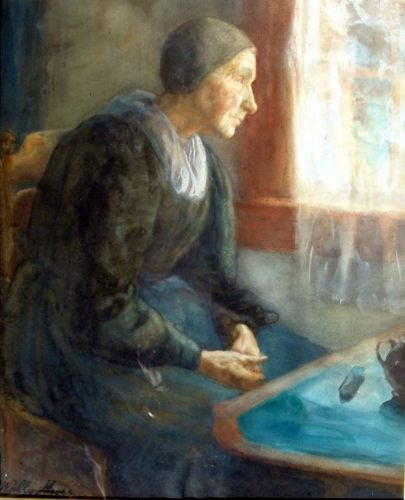
Figure at a Window

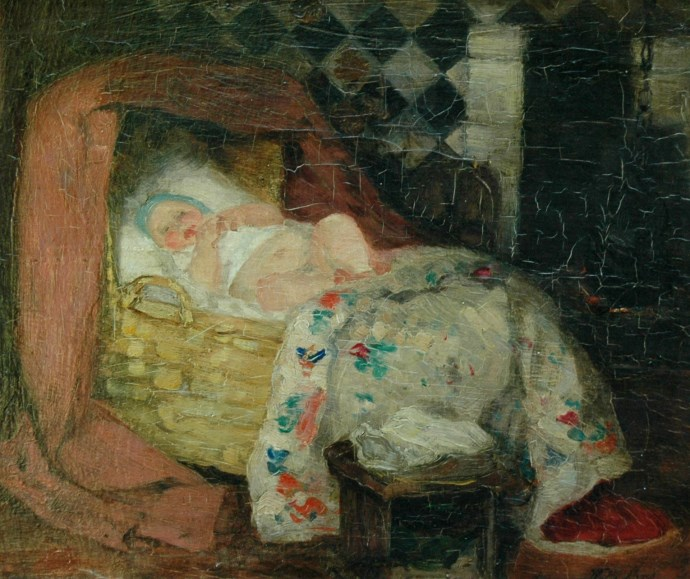
Interior with Baby in Bassinet

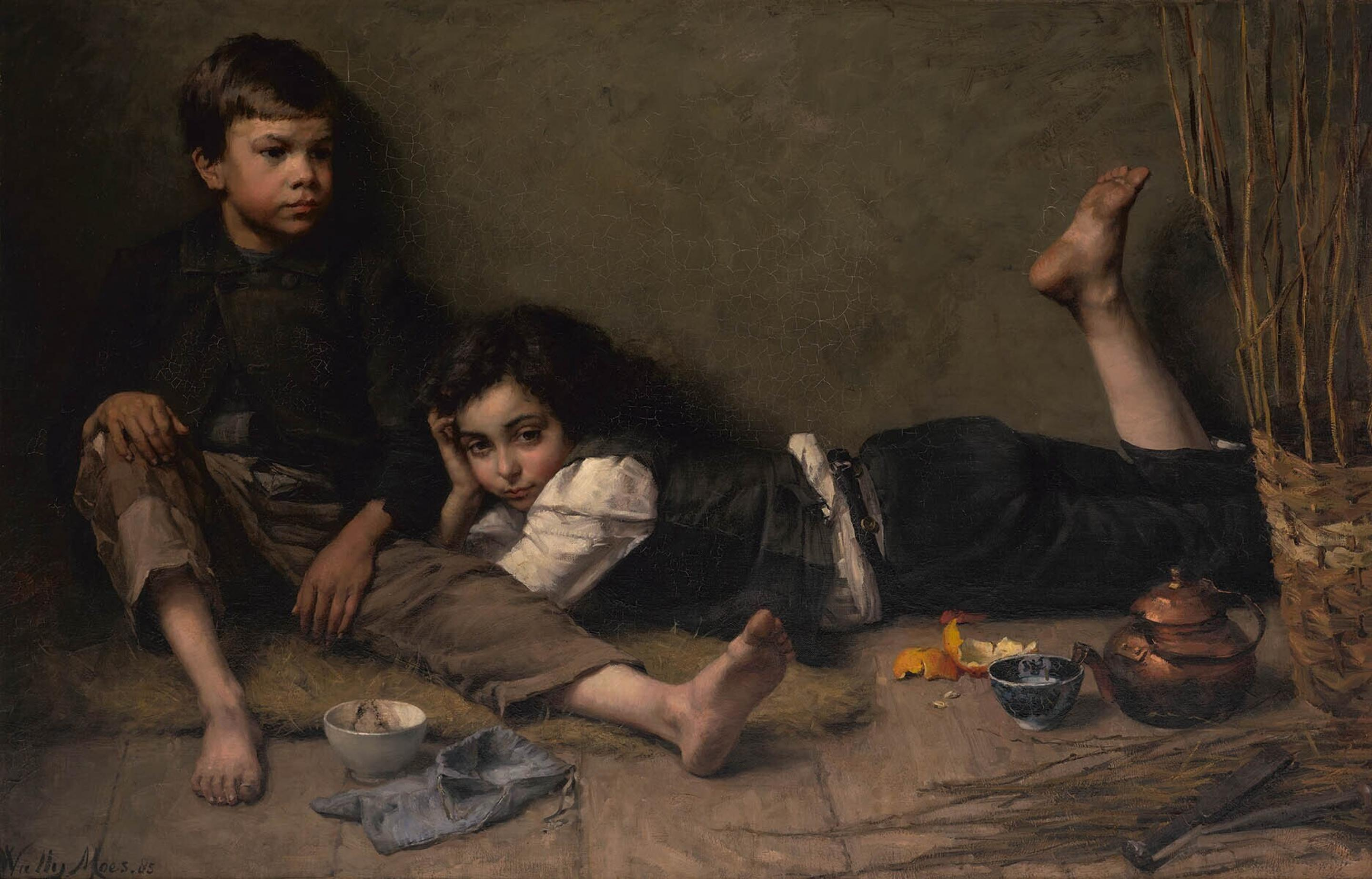
Lunch Hour

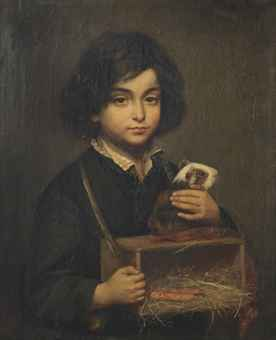
Boy with Guinea Pig
on its Box
