= Louis Apol =

Dutch painter

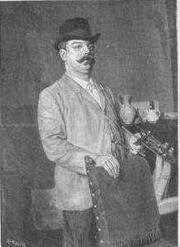
Photo of Louis Apol around 1904

Lodewijk Frederik Hendrik (Louis) Apol (6 September 1850 in The Hague - 22 November 1936 in The Hague) was a Dutch painter and one of the most prominent representatives of the Hague School.

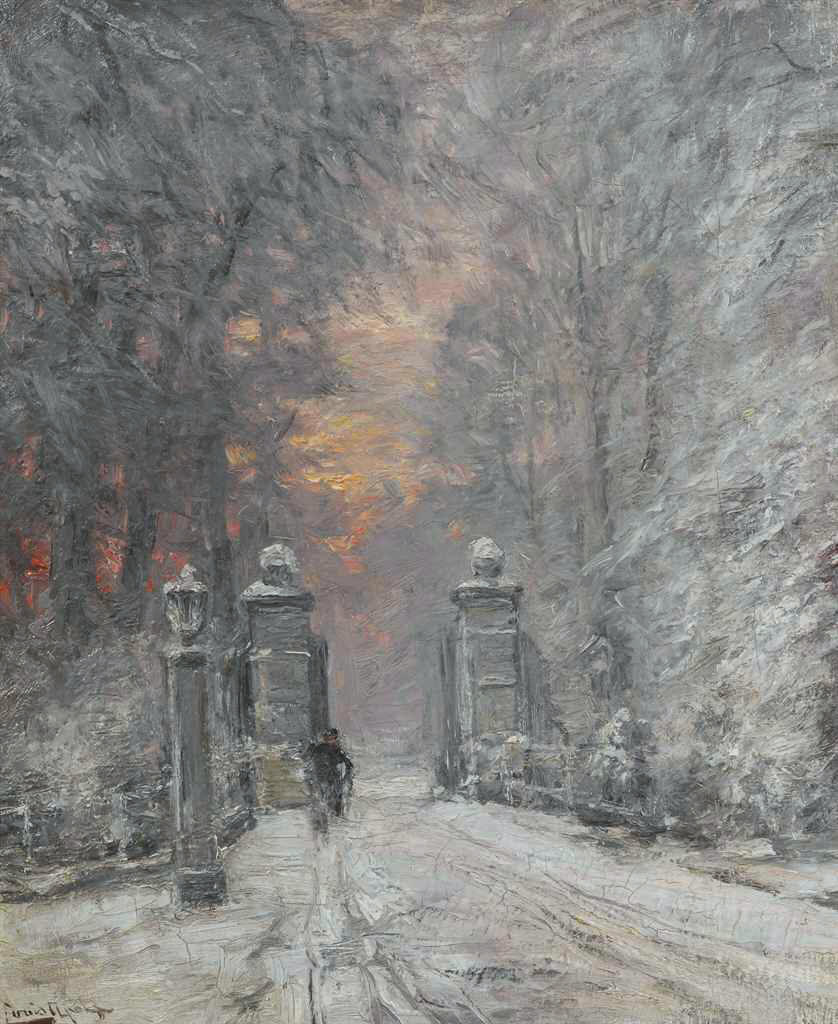
Winter, oil on canvas

Apol's talent was discovered early in his life and his father ordered private lessons for him. His teachers were J.F. Hoppenbrouwers and P.F. Stortenbeker. He received a scholarship from the Dutch King Willem III in 1868. Apol specialized in winter landscapes; people are seldom depicted in his paintings. He mostly painted snowy forest landscapes with subtle man-made artefacts, such as a bridge or fence.

In 1880 Apol took part in an expedition on the SS Willem Barents to Spitsbergen in the Arctic Ocean. The impressions of this journey were a source of inspiration during his whole life.

His work is widely spread and found in the USA, Canada, United Kingdom, Belgium, Germany and the Netherlands. The Rijksmuseum Amsterdam and the Gemeentemuseum Den Haag have work of Louis Apol in their collection. A street is named after him in the neighborhood of streets named after 19th and 20th century Dutch painters in Overtoomse Veld-Noord, Amsterdam.
