= Bernard de Hoog =

Dutch painter (1867–1943)

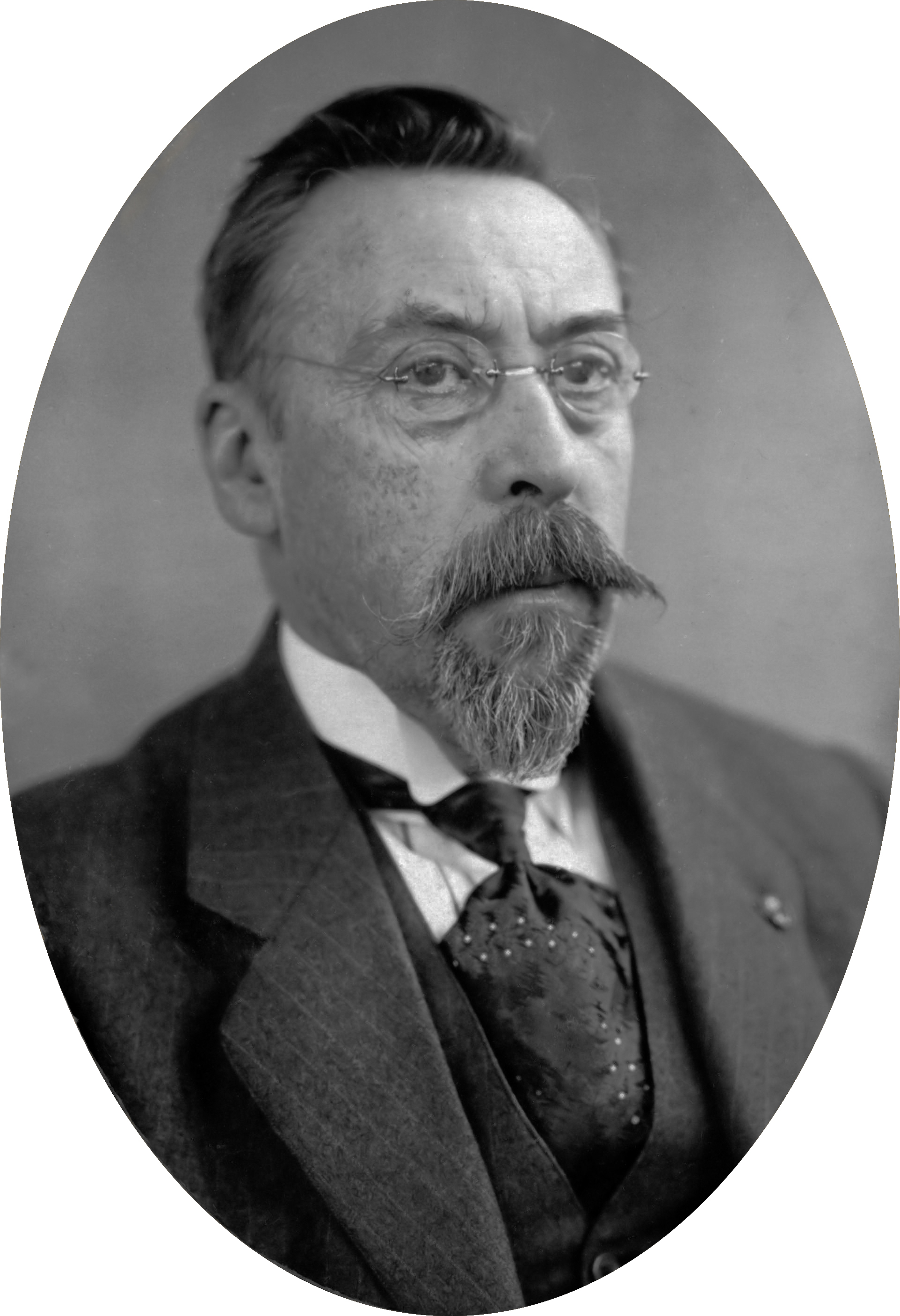
- De Hoog, 1929
- Born: 19 November 1867; Amsterdam, Netherlands
- Died: 1943 (aged 75–76); The Hague, Netherlands
- Known for: Painting

Bernard de Hoog (born 19 November 1867 in Amsterdam, died in The Hague, 1943) was a Dutch painter influenced by the Hague School.

Bernard showed talent as a schoolboy, but his request to study art was refused. He spent two or three years working in an office and the merchant who found sketches and drawings instead of figures in the ledgers gave him a commission to make a portrait of his wife. With the merchant's encouragement, Bernard was sent to a drawing master and afterwards to a drawing academy.

The last few years as a student were made easier by his success in gaining the subsidy from the Dutch Queen, which he held for two years. He worked for some time under one of the greatest Dutch animal painters, Johannes Cornelis 'Jan' van Essen (1854–1936), and copied many of the old masters, such as Pieter de Hooch and Frans Hals. His painting from nature enabled him to understand the old masters. During the year 1886 De Hoog's talent became noticed. He had admired the paintings of Jozef Israëls and Albert Neuhuys. The first great picture that he exhibited was shown in Amsterdam, entitled 'During the Sermon in the new Church'.

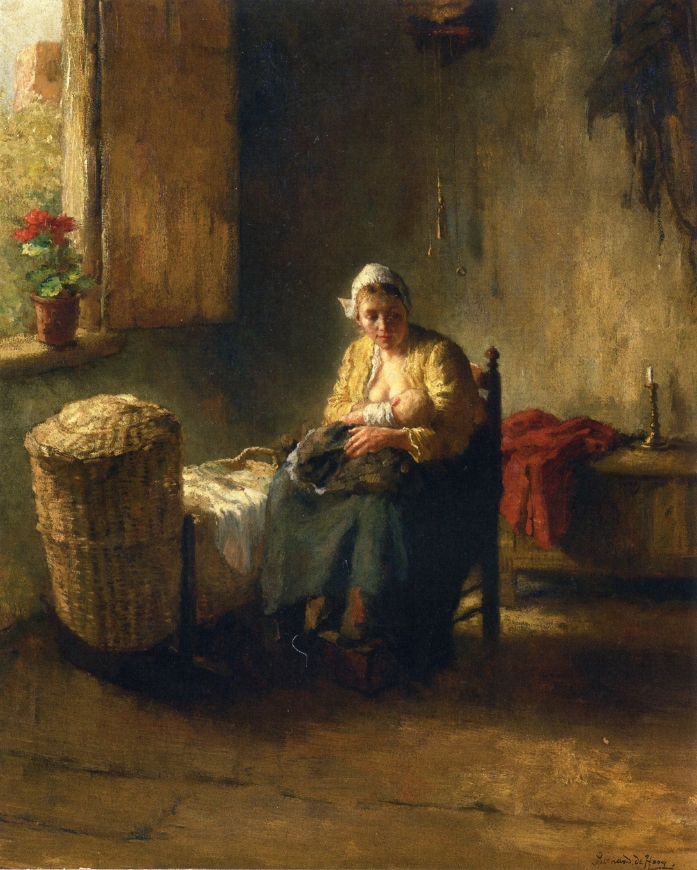
The Mother

Soon De Hoog came to be a painter of interiors, because he lived in a village rich in them. He painted interiors for four years, and then migrated to other provinces with his family. His effective talent was by this time fully appreciated, and people understood his originality. Although influenced by the work of Israëls, no one can deny the individuality of De Hoog.

De Hoog followed the Hague School, primarily a movement of realism, a reaction against the previous mood of romanticism. He was advocating the simple country life, a happy and innocent atmosphere where children play a major part. He painted many small pictures of the life of the country people, of the homes of the peasants, with the light shining through the ancient windows. De Hoog had a developed mind and excellent taste. In the simple appearance of the simple life of the Dutch people he discovered a beauty of thought which dictated his management of tone, he knew exactly the way to express the sentiment that was in him.

On the Continent his pictures attracted much attention, and he was well received in the Netherlands, where his popular scenes were exhibited and sold at many provincial and National galleries. His paintings were also readily exported around the world, especially to the US, Canada, and England.

De Hoog's work was included in the 1939 exhibition and sale Onze Kunst van Heden (Our Art of Today) at the Rijksmuseum in Amsterdam.

De Hoog died at the Hague in 1943.

== Sources ==
- The International studio, Volume 36. 1909: The John Lane Company. 1909. pp. 282–285.
