= Ferdinand Hart Nibbrig =

Dutch painter (1866–1915)

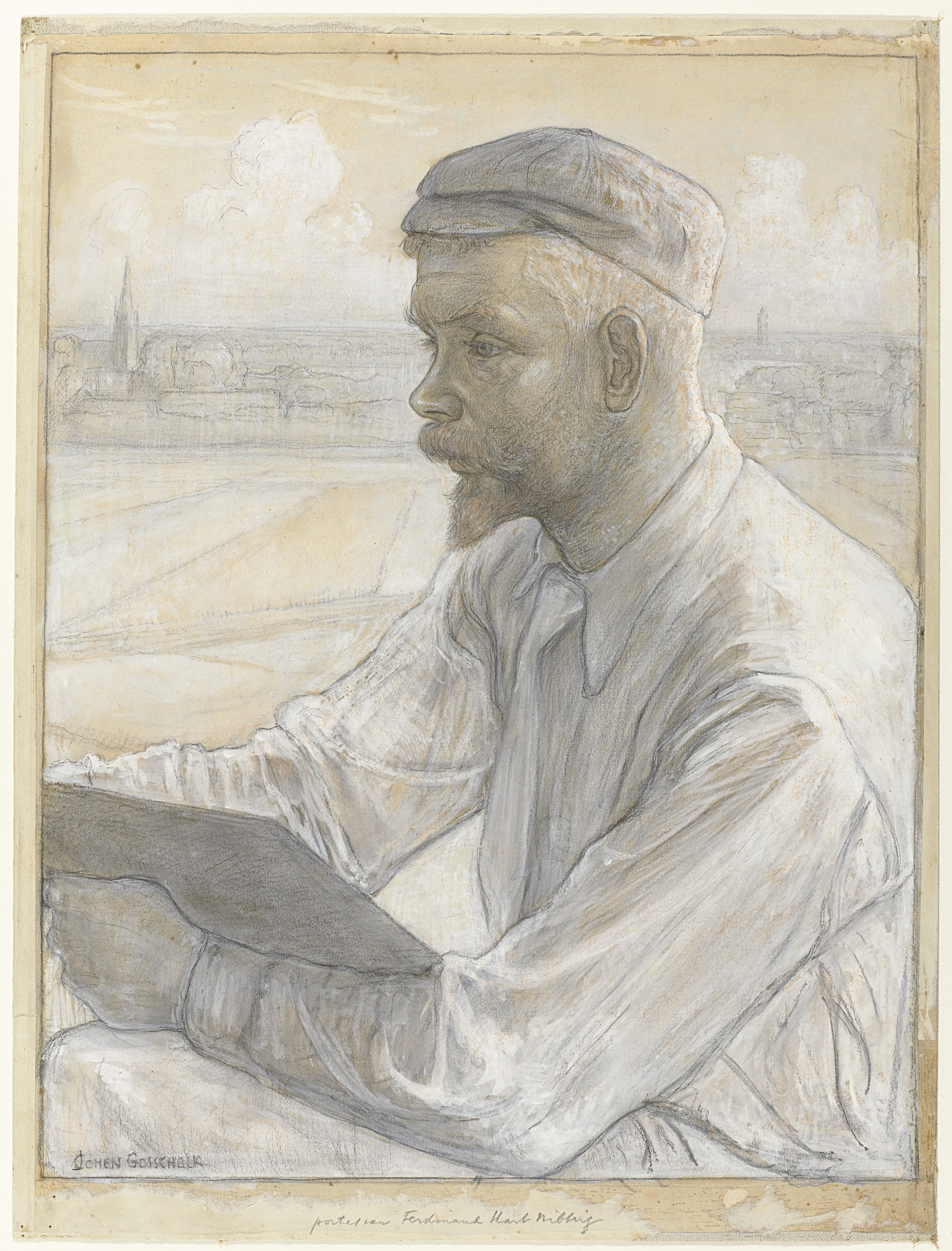
- Portrait by Johan Cohen Gosschalk
- Born: 5 April 1866; Amsterdam, Netherlands
- Died: 12 October 1915 (aged 49); Laren, Netherlands
- Movement: Luminism
- Spouse: Johanna Bartruida Moltzer

Ferdinand Hart Nibbrig (5 April 1866 – 12 October 1915) was a Dutch painter and Theosophist. He was one of the first artists who introduced luminism to the Netherlands. Hart was his mother's maiden name. He adopted it in 1884 when all of her brothers had died without issue. During his student years he was a renowned amateur racing cyclist.

== Biography ==
Hart Nibbrig was born to a family of merchants. His grandfather, who had several well-known artists as friends, noticed Ferdinand's talent for drawing and advised his father to have him given lessons by Johan Adolph Rust (1828–1915), a noted marine painter who taught at the local technical school. His formal artistic training began at the Quellinusschool from 1881 to 1883, followed by five years at the Rijksakademie. This was followed by a year in Paris at the Académie Julian and the Atelier Cormon.

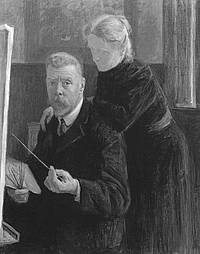
Self-portrait with his wife, Johanna

Initially, he painted in the style of Amsterdam Impressionism but, while in Paris, came under the influence of Vincent van Gogh and Georges Seurat and adopted Pointillism. His first studio, in Amsterdam, had originally belonged to Jozef Israëls. Later, he lived in Laren, North Holland, but worked throughout the Netherlands, especially in Vlieland and Zoutelande. He also travelled to Germany and Algeria, which proved to be a disappointment because it was too hot to work and he could not find any models.

In 1895, he married Johanna Bartruida Moltzer (1869–1957), whom he met while doing portraits of her family. After 1906, he began to feel that Laren was losing its character and moved to Rhenen, Utrecht. During this time, he reverted to older styles of painting.

He returned to Laren a year later, however; in 1910, he built a house, designed by Georg Sturm. He also took numerous students; most notably Jacoba van Heemskerck.

In 1908, his wife left the Dutch Reformed Church to become a Theosophist. Ferdinand followed suit, joining the lodge in the Gooi and hosting meetings in their home. After his death, Johanna moved to Dornach, Switzerland, where Rudolf Steiner had established a private institute.

A permanent exhibition of his paintings, drawings and lithographs was established at the Singer Museum in 1981. A street is named after him in the Overtoomse Veld neighbourhood of Amsterdam; an area which features streets named after 19th- and 20th-century Dutch painters.

== Selected paintings ==
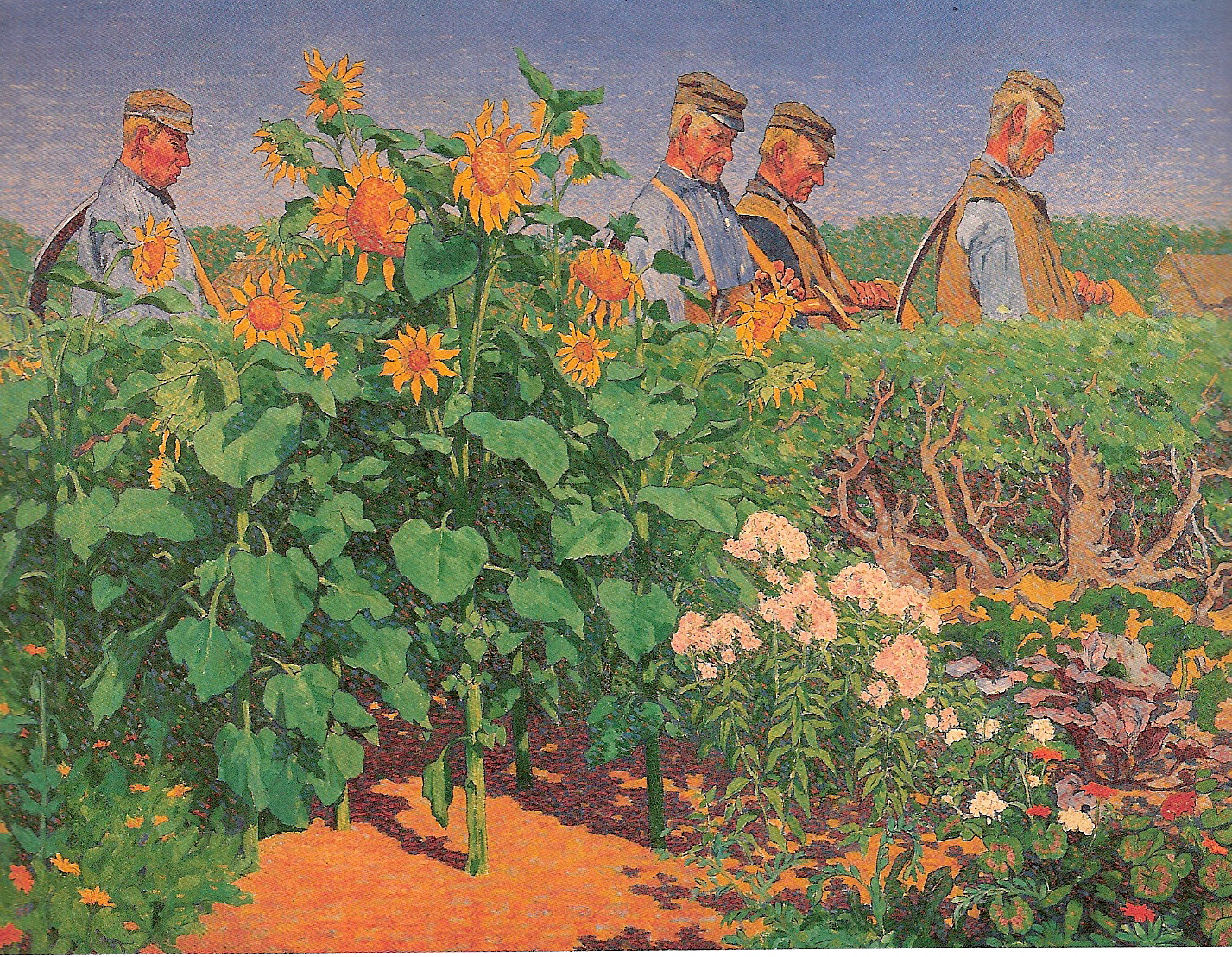
Harvest (1894)

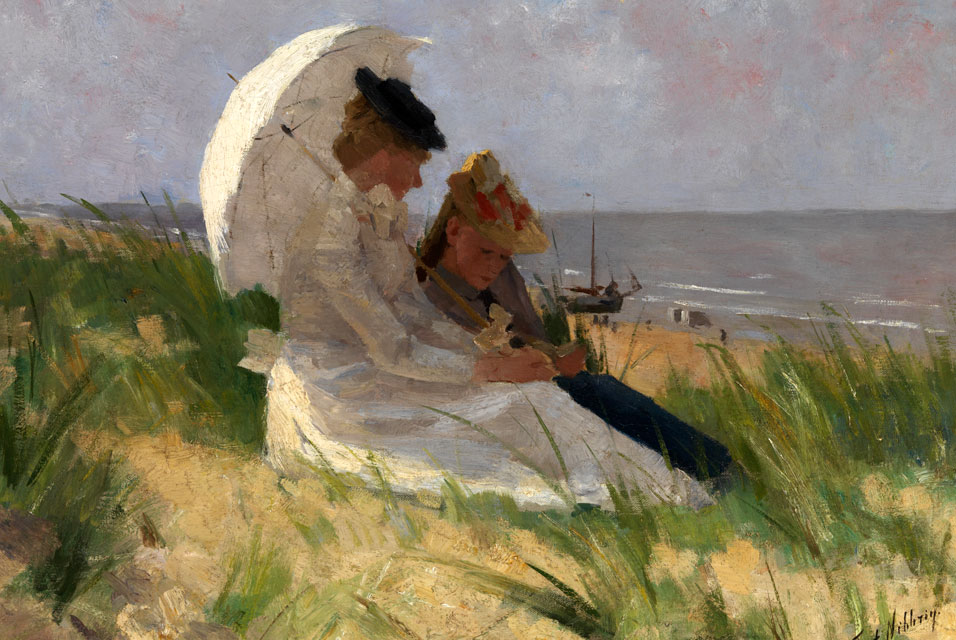
On the dunes in Zandvoort (1892)

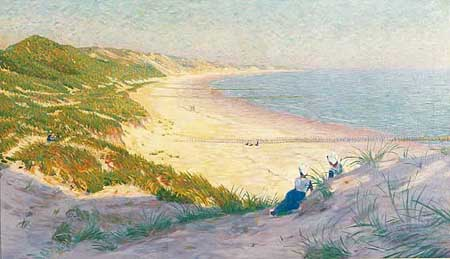
Zoutelande (c.1910)

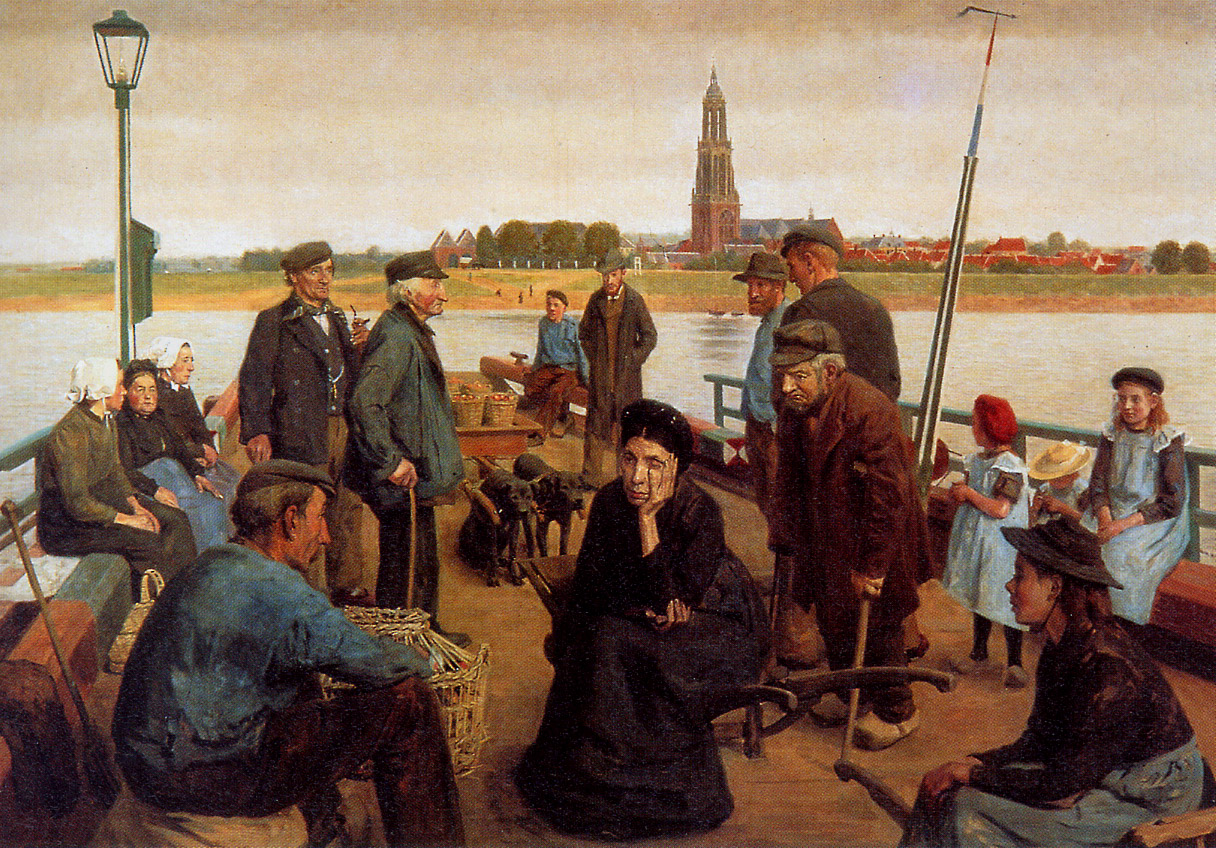
The Ferry at Rhenen (1907)
