= Singer Laren =

Art museum and concert hall in Laren, the Netherlands

Coordinates: 52°15′34″N 5°13′20″E

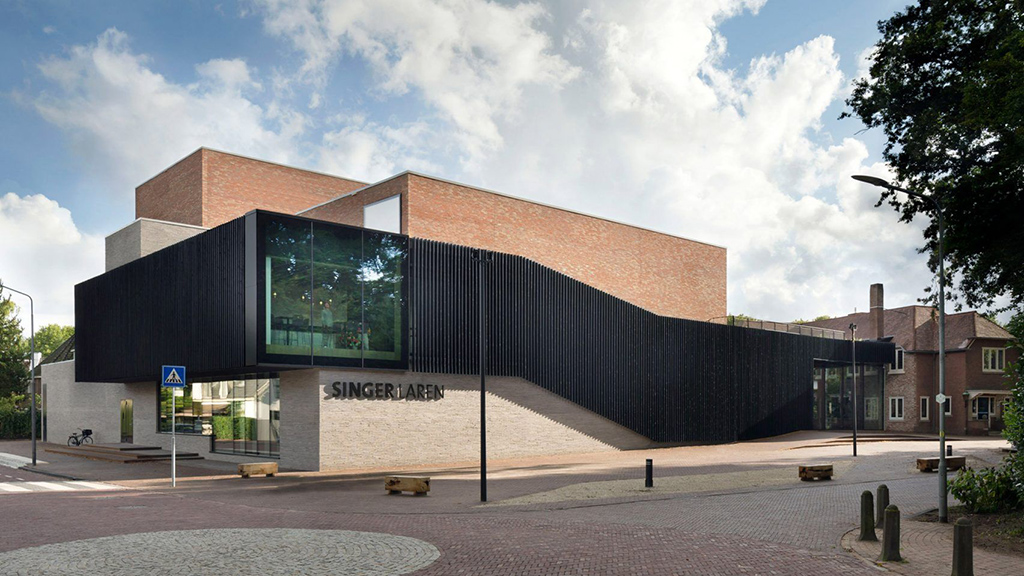
- Established: 1956
- Location: Oude Drift 1 Laren, the Netherlands
- Type: Art museum
- Director: Jan Rudolph de Lorm
- Website: https://www.singerlaren.nl/en/

Singer Laren is a museum and concert hall located in Laren, in the Netherlands. The museum is devoted to presenting and preserving the collection of the American artist William Henry Singer Jr. (1868–1943) and his wife Anna (1878–1962).

The museum was established in 1956. The core collection from the Singer family is largely drawn from art created in the period from 1880 to 1950, including paintings from the French Barbizon School and the Dutch Gooische School. The broader museum collection is continually expanding, with a focus on modernist works from movements such as neo-impressionism, pointillism, expressionism, cubism and geometric abstraction.

Doede Hardeman was announced as the new director of Singer Laren, starting 1 November 2025.

== William Henry Singer ==
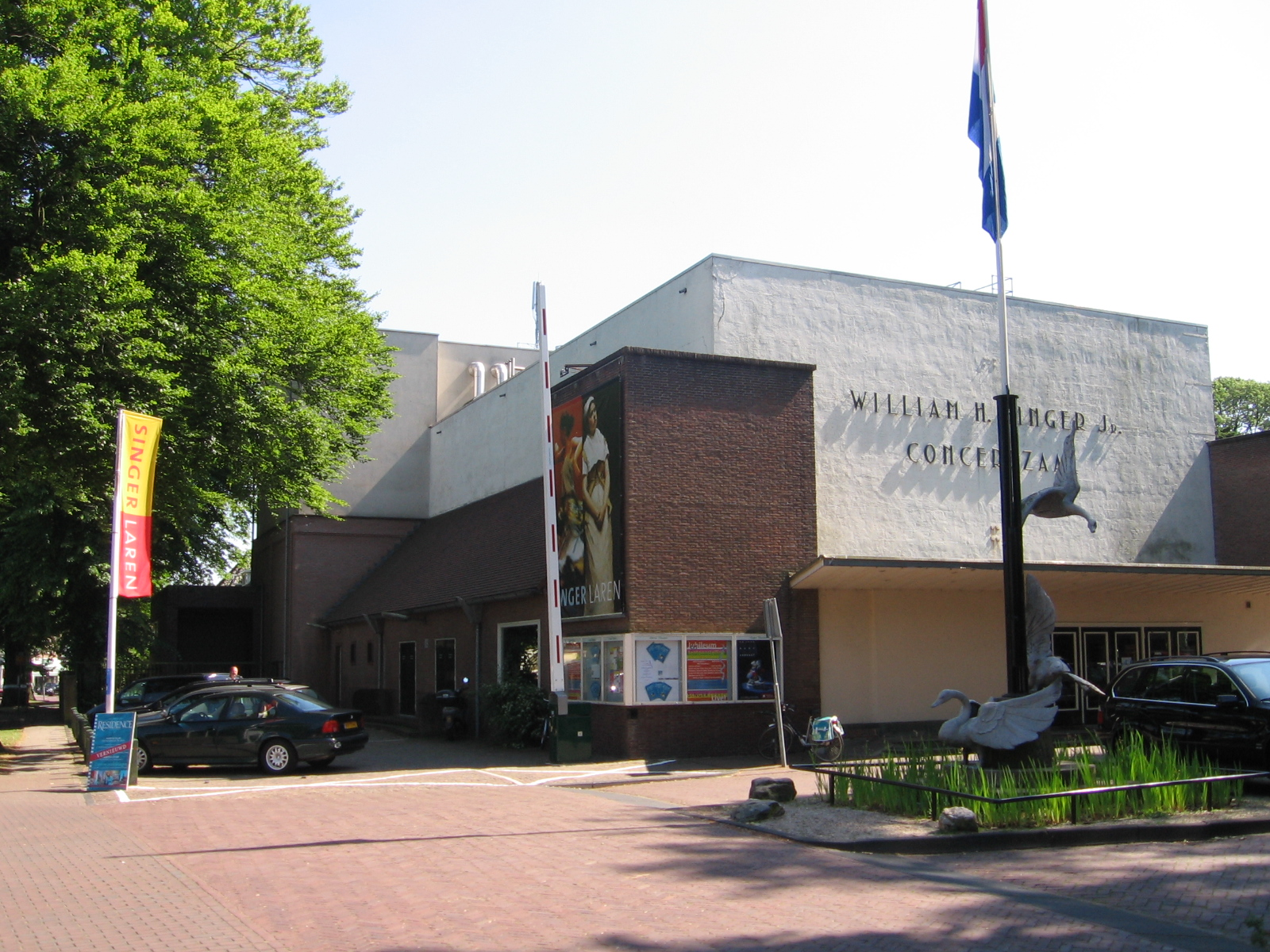
Singer museum and sculpture De Zwanen in Laren, June 2006

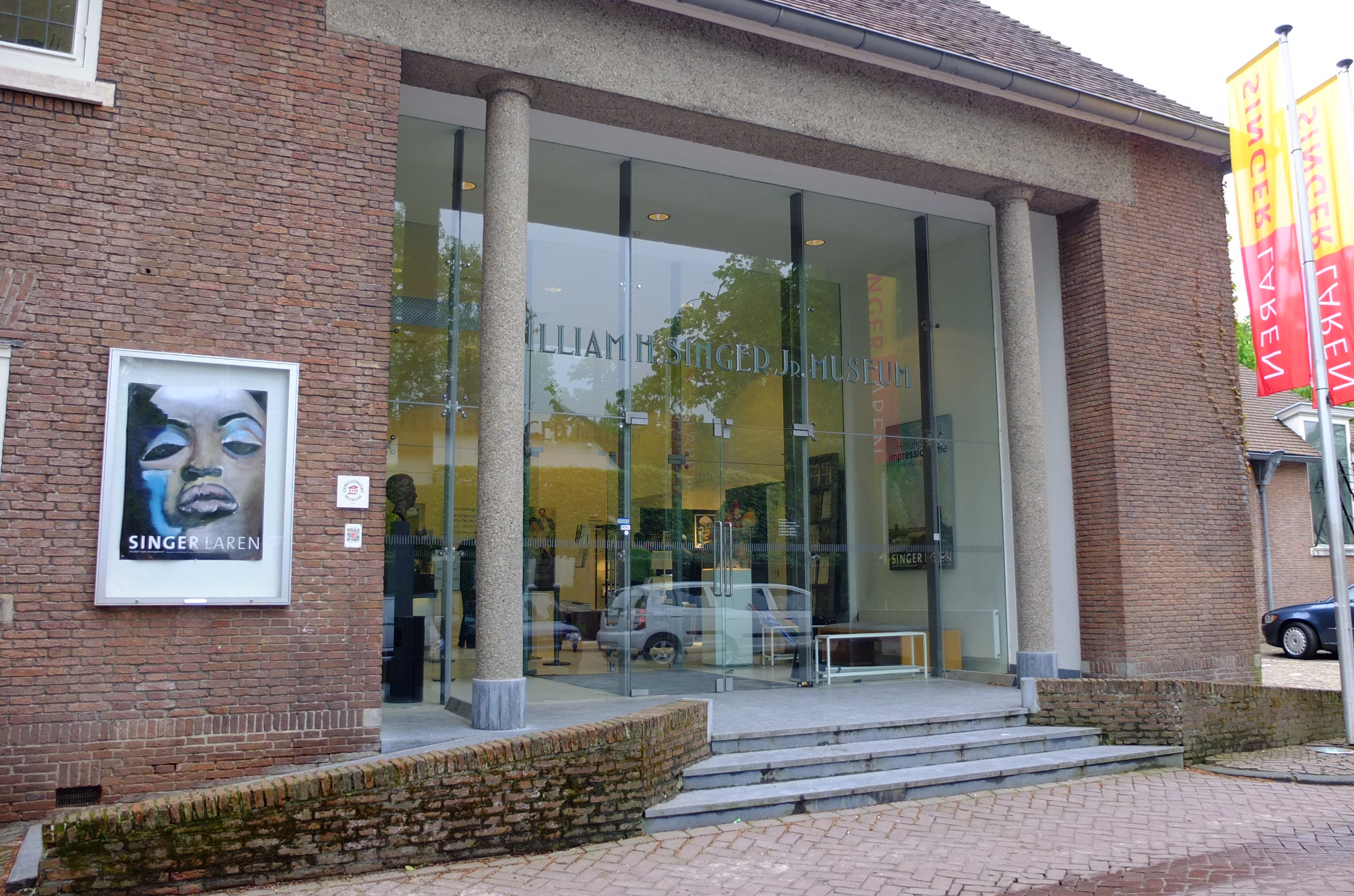
Singer museum, April 2012

William Henry Singer was the son of a steel baron of the same name who sold his company Pittsburgh Bessemer Steel Co. to Andrew Carnegie. Against the wishes of his father, young Singer became an artist and after marrying Anna Spencer-Brugh in 1895, he moved to Monhegan, Maine to join the artist colony there. His father was disappointed that he chose art rather than business and insisted he earn his living as an artist. His seascapes sold well, however, and together with the artist Martin Borgord, the couple traveled to Paris where they studied art at the Académie Julian in 1901.

Attracted by the artist colony in Laren, made famous by the Dutch painters Jozef Israëls, Anton Mauve, Jacob Maris, Albert Neuhuys, and their pupils such as Matthijs Maris, Arina Hugenholtz, they decided to settle there. They were not the first foreigners to visit the artist colony in Laren; Max Liebermann, who often spent summers painting in the Netherlands, visited in the company of Isaac Israëls, Josef's son. The Singers knew them and others such as the pointillists Co Breman & Ferdinand Hart Nibbrig. They remained special friends with Martin Borgord, with whom they traveled to Norway. Other close friends were the painters Walter Griffin, Henri Le Sidaner and Jacob & Willem Dooijewaard.

== Museum building ==
In 1954 Anna Spencer-Brugh (Singer's widow) founded the Singer Memorial Foundation. Two years later, the museum, designed by the Dutch architect Wouter Hamdorff, was opened. It was an expansion of the Singer's home, "De Wilde Zwanen", on the Oude Drift, with a concert hall attached.

An architecture competition for reconstruction of the complex was organised in 2012. The winners - the architect Sanne Oomen from the architectural firm denieuwegeneratie (The New Generation) - were commissioned for the project. The final design was prepared by Oomen Ontwerpt, Oscar Vos and Thomas Dieben (denieuwegeneratie, later KRFT) in collaboration with VDNDP architecten. The work was completed in 2017.

== Collection ==
The museum hosts the Singer collection of paintings and sculpture and artifacts, by members of the Laren School, the Hague School (Pulchri Studio), and Bergen School (art), and also has examples of Expressionism. Some of the more prominent names in the collection acquired since 1956, are Bart van der Leck, Jan Sluijters, Leo Gestel, Chris Beekman, Jan Toorop, Else Berg, Mommie Schwarz (the husband of Else Berg), Gustave De Smet and Herman Kruyder.

The museum also organises a regular series of exhibitions of modernist and contemporary art.

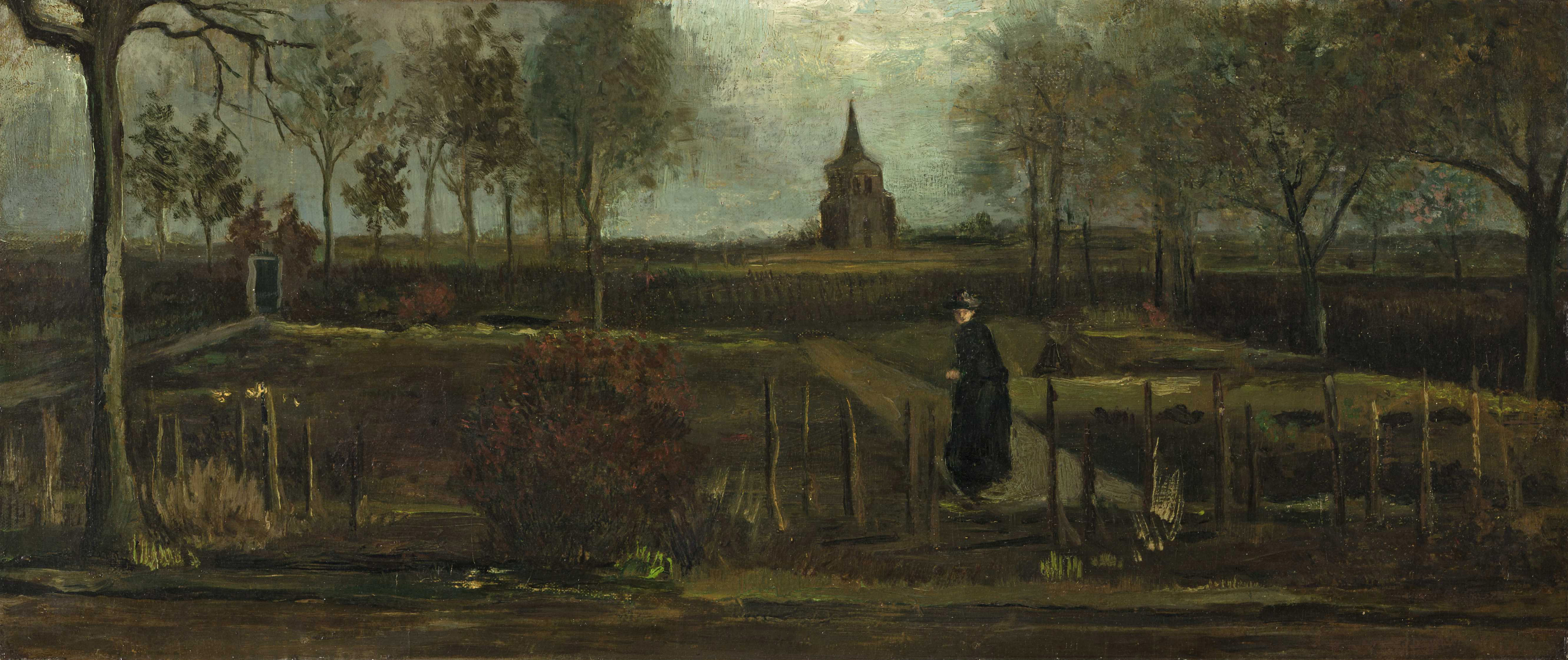
The Parsonage Garden at Nuenen, 1884, by Vincent van Gogh. It was recovered in 2023 after being stolen in 2020.

== Governance and organisation ==
The museum attracted around 300,000 visitors in 2024.

As of 2024, the museum employed 110 staff (which amounted to around just over 60 full-time positions) The budget was between 8 and 9 million Euros per year.

== Recovery of Van Gogh painting ==
On the morning of 30 March 2020, a painting, The Parsonage Garden at Nuenen by Vincent van Gogh, on loan from the Groninger Museum, was stolen while the institution was closed to the public during the COVID-19 pandemic. The painting was recovered in September 2023.
