= Albert Neuhuys =

Dutch painter

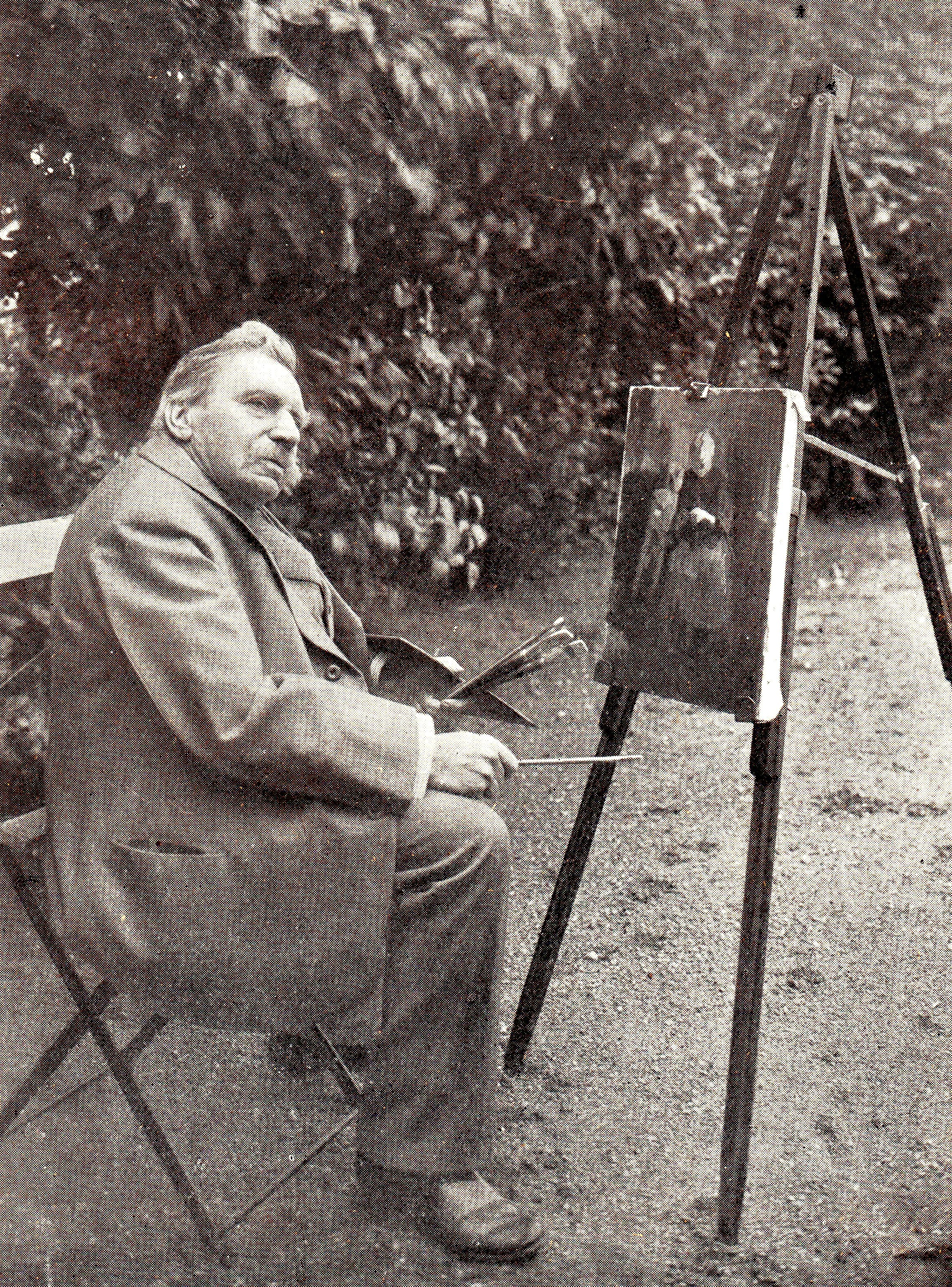
Albert Neuhuys

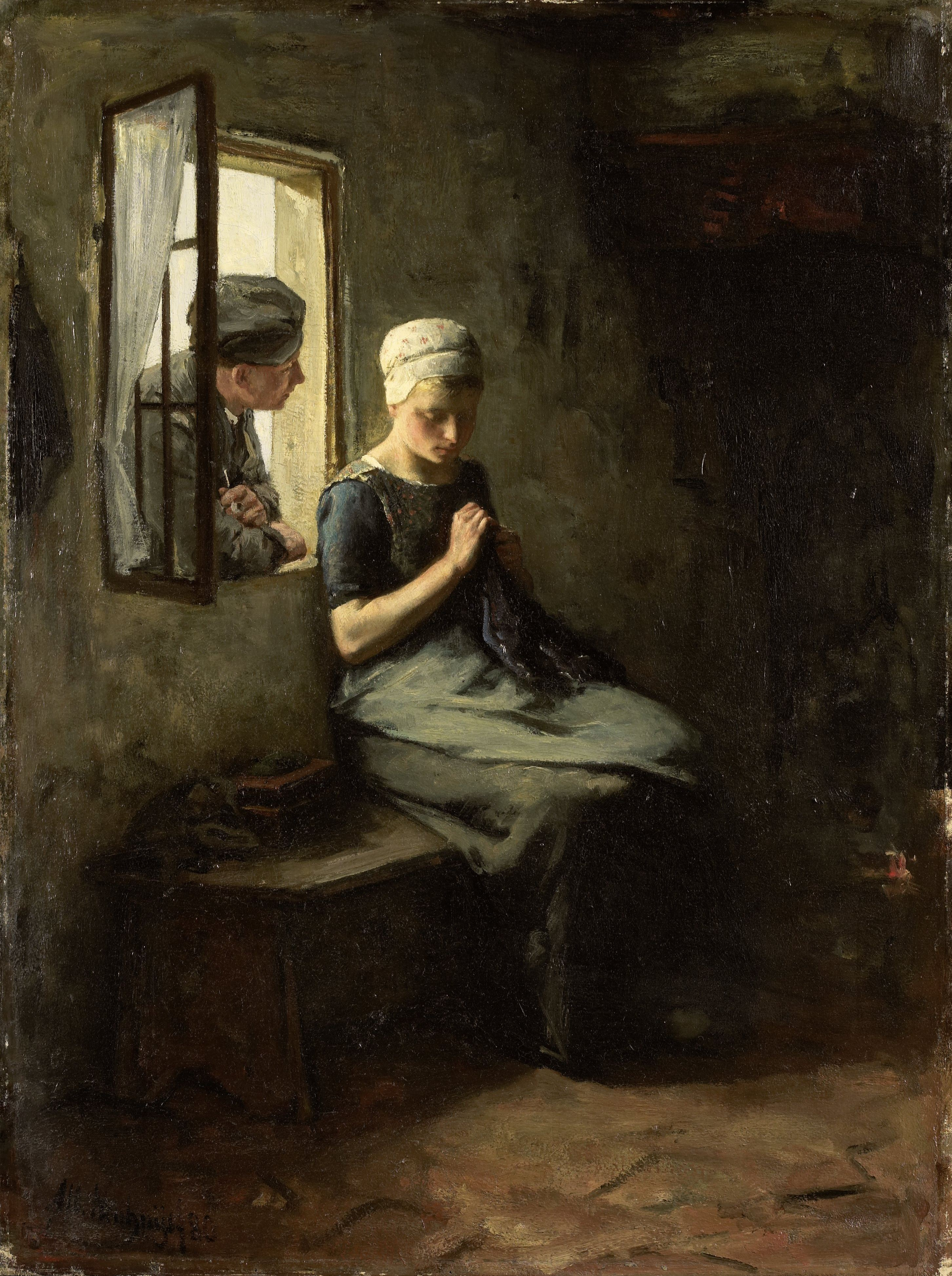
The Fishermans Fancy ('Vissersvrijage')

Johannes Albert Neuhuys (10 June 1844 – 6 February 1914) was one of the best-known painters of the Laren School and a friend of many of the Hague School painters.

== Biography ==
Neuhuys was born in Utrecht. He went to the Municipal Drawing School in Utrecht from 1858 to 1860 and then worked for the lithographer Van de Weyer in Utrecht, who went bankrupt two years later. From that time on, Neuhuys devoted himself to drawing and painting. From 1868 to 1872, he took lessons at the Antwerp Academy, where he was supported by a royal stipend. Here he painted interiors, specializing in the shine of satin clothes, after the example of the 17th-century artist Pieter de Hooch.

In 1872, Neuhuys moved to Amsterdam, where he met Jozef Israëls, Anton Mauve and the brothers Jacob Maris and Matthijs Maris. In 1876, he moved to The Hague. Much like the other Hague School painters, his detailed manner of painting changed to a much looser stroke. His use of color was also inspired by Jacob Maris and his watercolors became known for their sparkling transparency and the use of light.

The increasing urbanization around The Hague forced the painters of the Hague School to look further afield for their subjects. When Israëls told Neuhuys how picturesque Laren was, he moved, in 1883; two years later, Anton Mauve also moved there and, together with him, Neuhuys was regarded as the founder of the Laren School. He painted the farmers and weavers in their homes and rented a flax barn where he drew and painted spinners.

In 1885, he moved to Hilversum. From 1900 to 1910 he lived in Amsterdam, where he was known to many for his colorful Laren rural interiors work. He moved to Zurich in 1910 but continued to visit Laren in the spring and autumn. He died on 6 February 1914 in Orselina near Locarno, and was buried in Oud Eik en Duinen, a cemetery in The Hague.

== Sources ==
- Sillevis, John and Tabak, Anne, The Hague School Book, Waanders Uitgegevers, Zwolle, 2004 (pp 323–330)
