= Laren, North Holland =

Laren
- Town and municipality
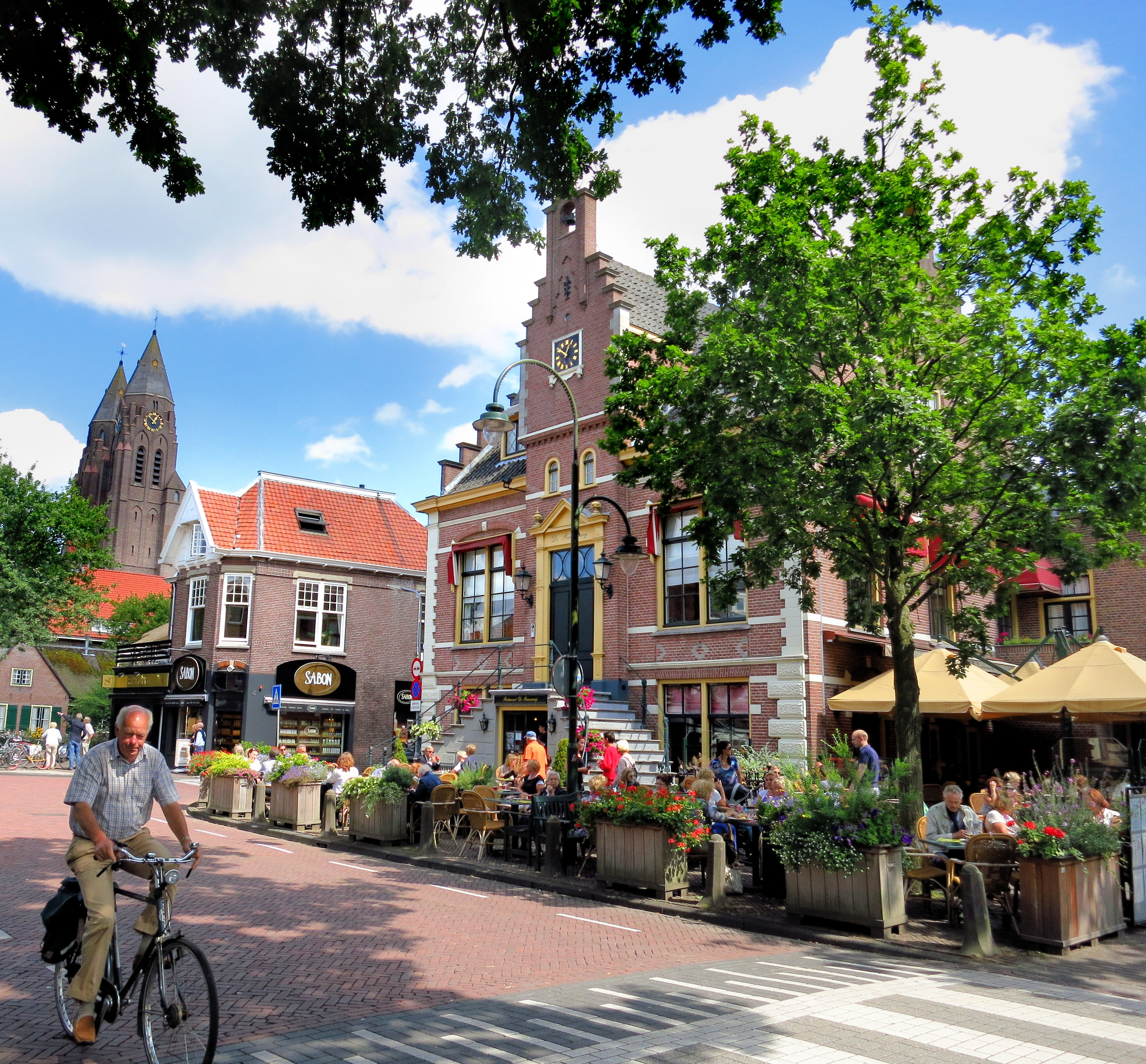
- Laren town centre

- Flag Coat of arms

- Location in North Holland
- Coordinates: 52°15′N 5°14′E
- Country: Netherlands
- Province: North Holland

Government
  - Body: Municipal council
  - Mayor: Robert van Rijn (VVD)

Area
  - Total: 12.41 km^{2} (4.79 sq mi)
  - Land: 12.41 km^{2} (4.79 sq mi)
  - Water: 0.00 km^{2} (0 sq mi)
- Elevation: 5 m (16 ft)

Population (January 2021)
  - Total: 11,398
  - Density: 918/km^{2} (2,380/sq mi)
- Demonym(s): Laarder, Larenaar
- Time zone: UTC+1 (CET)
  - Summer (DST): UTC+2 (CEST)
- Postcode: 1250–1252
- Area code: 035
- Website: www.laren.nl

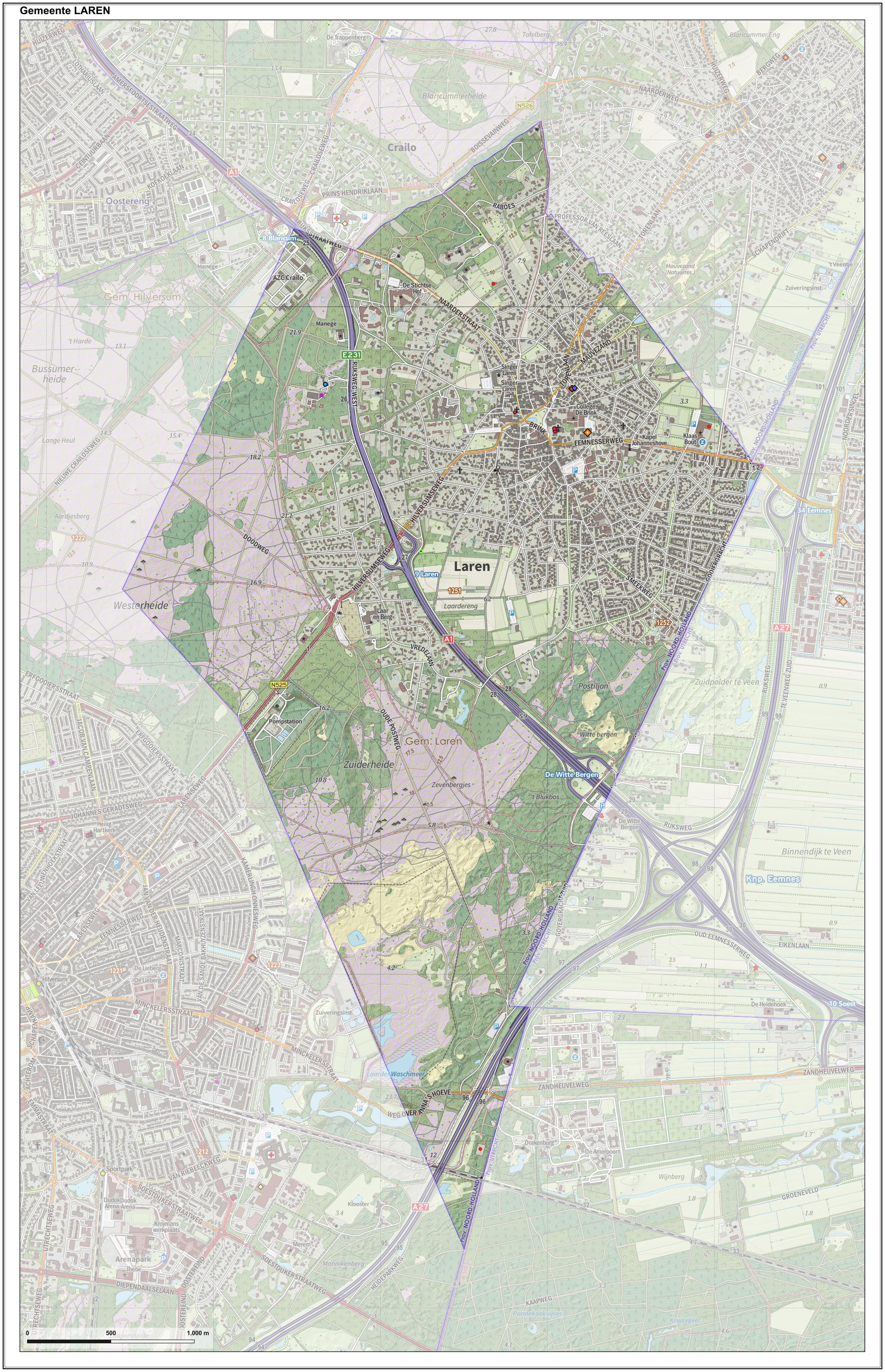
Map of Laren, 2015

Laren (Dutch pronunciation: [ˈlaːrə(n)]) is a town and municipality in the province of North Holland, Netherlands. Located in the Gooi region, it is the oldest town in the area. Together with its neighbor Blaricum, Laren is among the most affluent towns in the Netherlands.

Nationally, Laren is well known for its history as a late 19th-century art colony, preserved in the museum Singer Laren, its retirement home for elderly artists Rosa Spier Huis, as well as its wide array of shops. Laren is part of the Amsterdam metropolitan area, situated east of Amsterdam.

== Government ==
The municipal council of Laren consists of 15 seats, which since 2026 has been divided as follows:

- VVD – 5 seats
- Larens Behoud – 4 seats
- D66 – 2 seats
- Groen Laren – 2 seats
- Liberaal Laren – 1 seat
- CDA – 1 seat

== Demographics ==
In 2007, Laren had the following demographic data:

- Birth rate: 7.29 per 1,000
- Death rate: 17.94 per 1,000
- Natural growth rate: -1.07% per year

In August 2017, there were 11,135 inhabitants in Laren. The municipality has a population density of 897 people/km^{2} (2,320 people/mi^{2}).

== Notable residents ==
=== The arts ===
- Johan Briedé (1885–1980) artist, illustrated H. G. Wells' books
- Maurits Cornelis Escher (1898–1972), graphic artist, illustrator and printmaker, lived in Rosa Spier Huis from 1970
- Barthold Fles (1902–1989) a Dutch-American literary agent, author and translator; lived in Rosa Spier Huis from 1986
- Maarten Krabbé (1908 in Laren – 2005) a painter and art educator
- Hannie Lips (1924 – 2012 in Laren) a broadcaster and TV announcer
- Anton Mauve (1838–1888), painter, Hague School & Laren School, lived in Laren 1886/1888
- Johnny de Mol (born 1979 in Laren) an actor and presenter
- Albert Neuhuys (1844–1914), painter Laren School
- Roberto Vander (born 1950 in Laren) a Dutch-Chilean actor and singer
- Saar de Swart (1861–1951) a sculptor

=== Public service ===
- Jan van den Brink (1915 in Laren – 2006) a politician and banker
- Gerard Croiset (1909 in Laren – 1980) a parapsychologist, psychometrist and psychic
- Paul Joan George Kapteyn (born 1928 in Laren) a judge at the European Court of Justice
- Pim van Lommel (born 1943 in Laren) a cardiologist, author and researcher into near-death studies
- Maria Montessori (1870–1952) an Italian physician and education reformer, lived in Laren 1936/1939
- Roelof Nelissen (1931–2019) a politician and businessman; lived in Laren
- Mona Louise Parsons (1901–1976) a Canadian actress, nurse and member of an informal Dutch resistance network
- Elbert Roest (born 1954) a historian, politician, former teacher and former mayor of Laren
- Henk Zanoli (1923 in Laren – 2015) a lawyer and member of the Dutch resistance in WWII

=== Sport ===
- Willemien Aardenburg (born 1966 in Laren) a former Dutch field hockey player, team bronze medallist the 1988 Summer Olympics
- Thomas Boerma (born 1981 in Laren) a field hockey player, competed at the 2008 Summer Olympics
- Jacobine Veenhoven (born 1984 in Laren) a Dutch rower, team bronze medallist at the 2012 Summer Olympics
- Marcel van der Westen (born 1976 in Laren) a retired hurdler

== Gallery ==
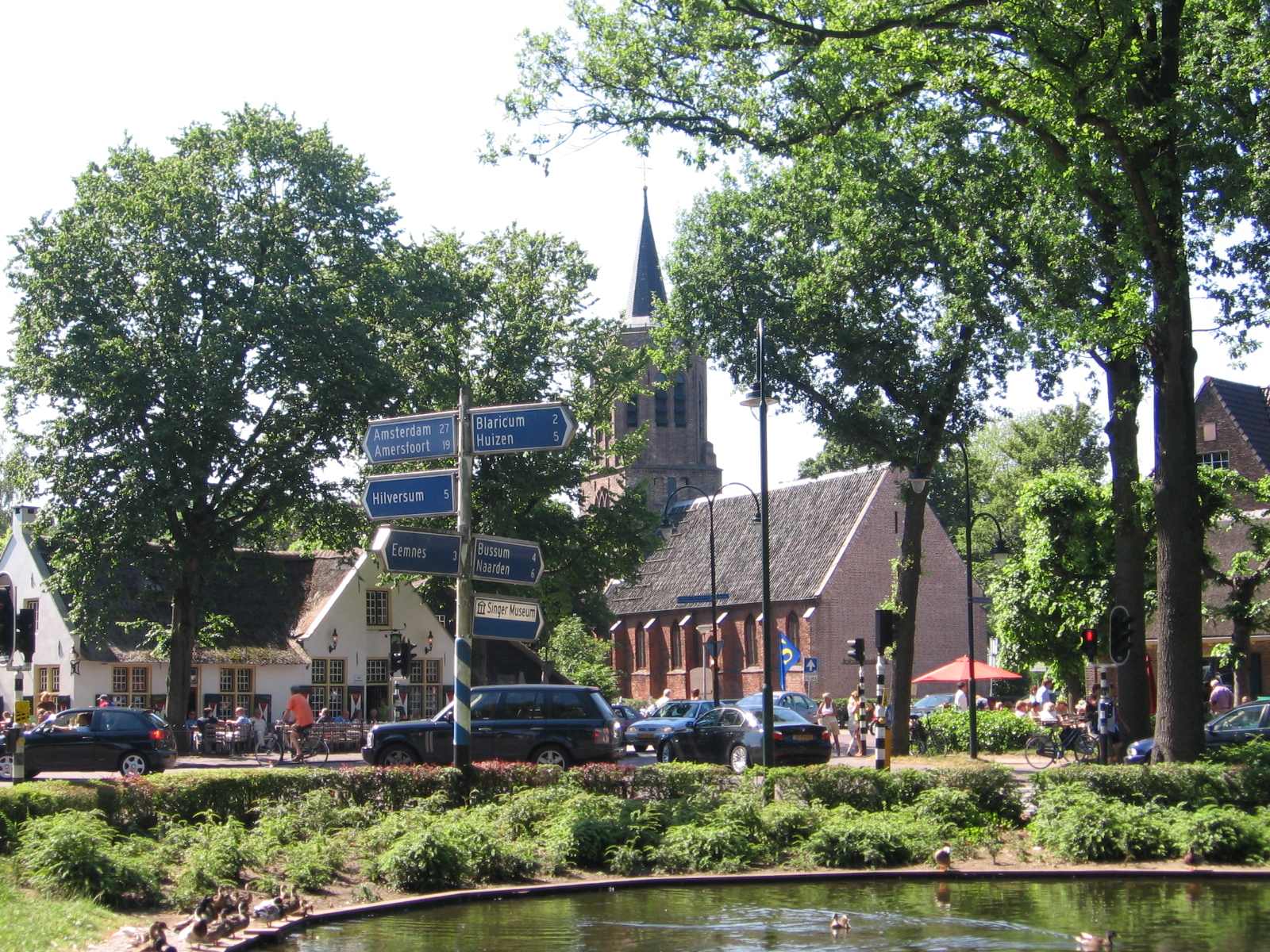
Town centre

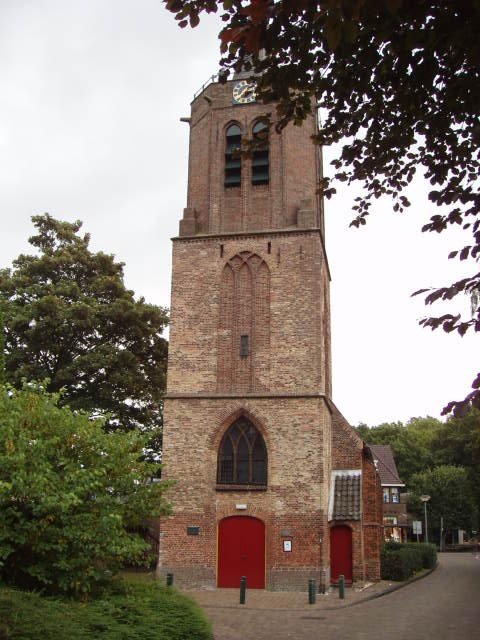
De Hervormde Kerk

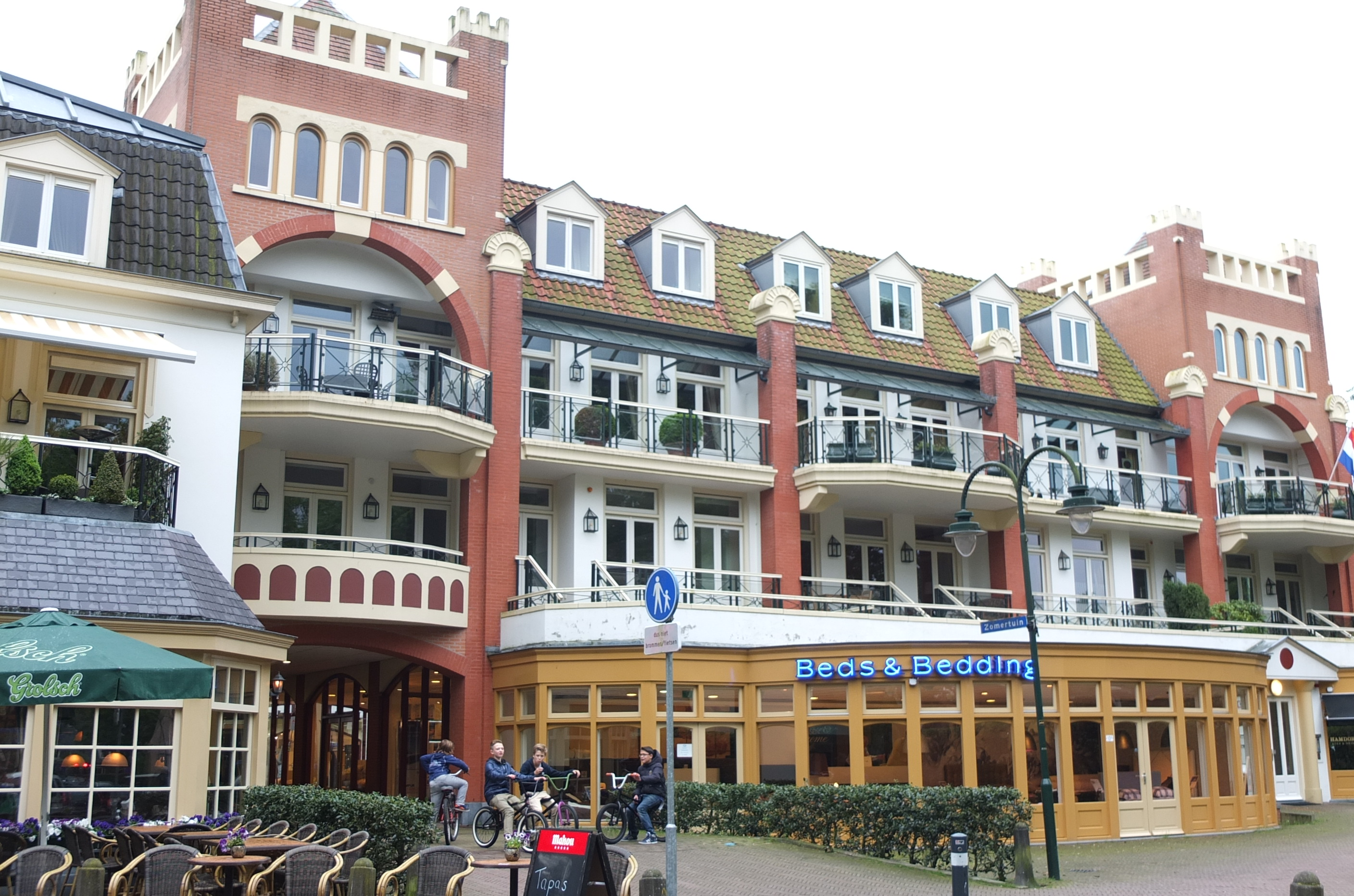
Laren

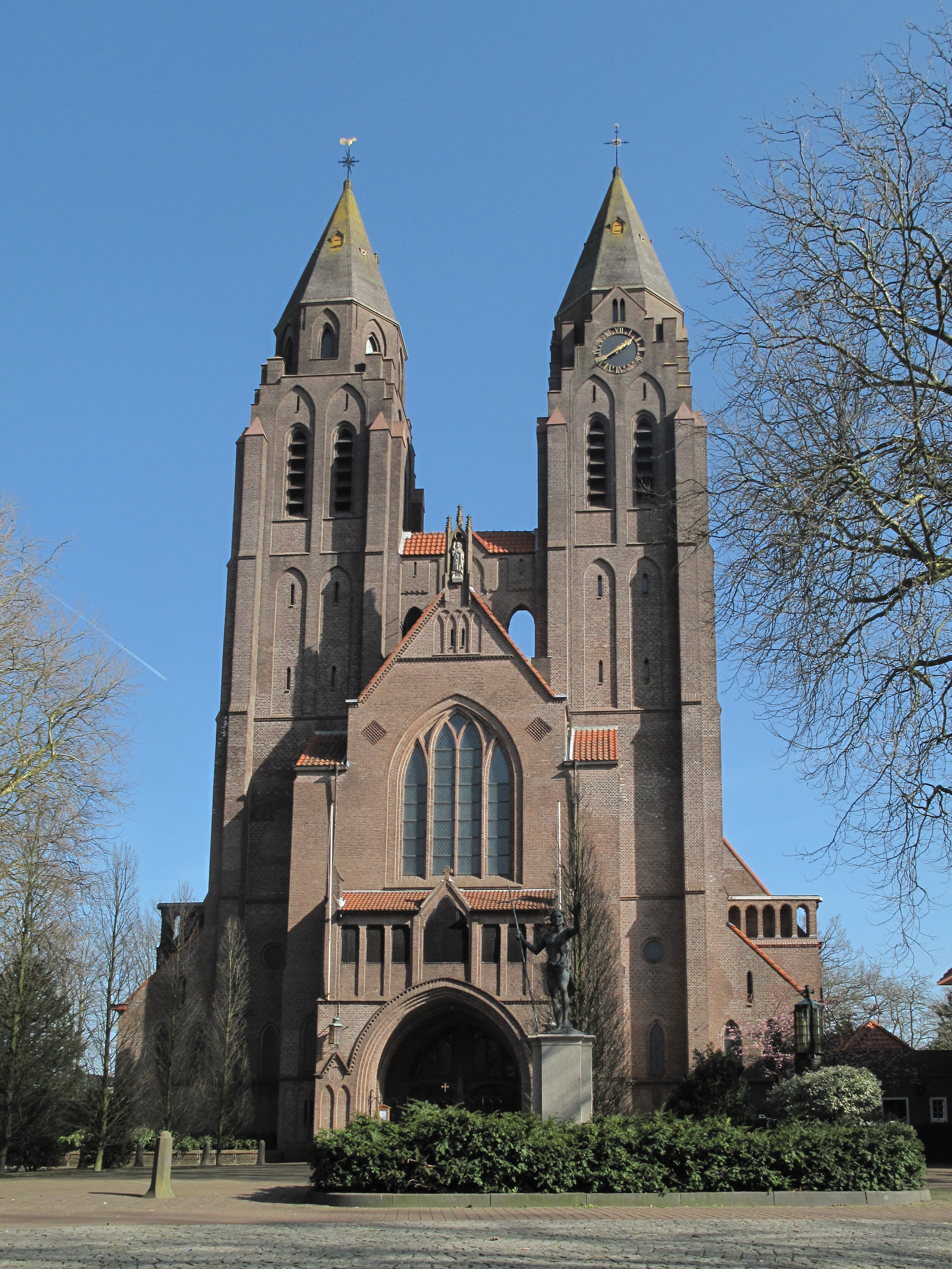
Laren, basilica: de Sint Jansbasiliek

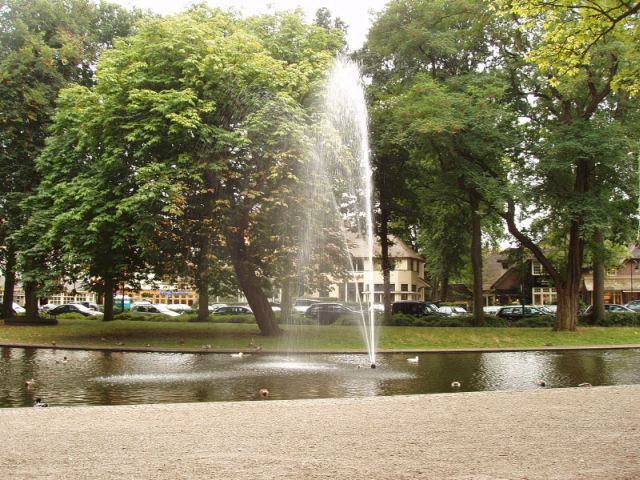
The Coeswaerde
