= John Rädecker =

Dutch painter and sculptor (1885–1956)

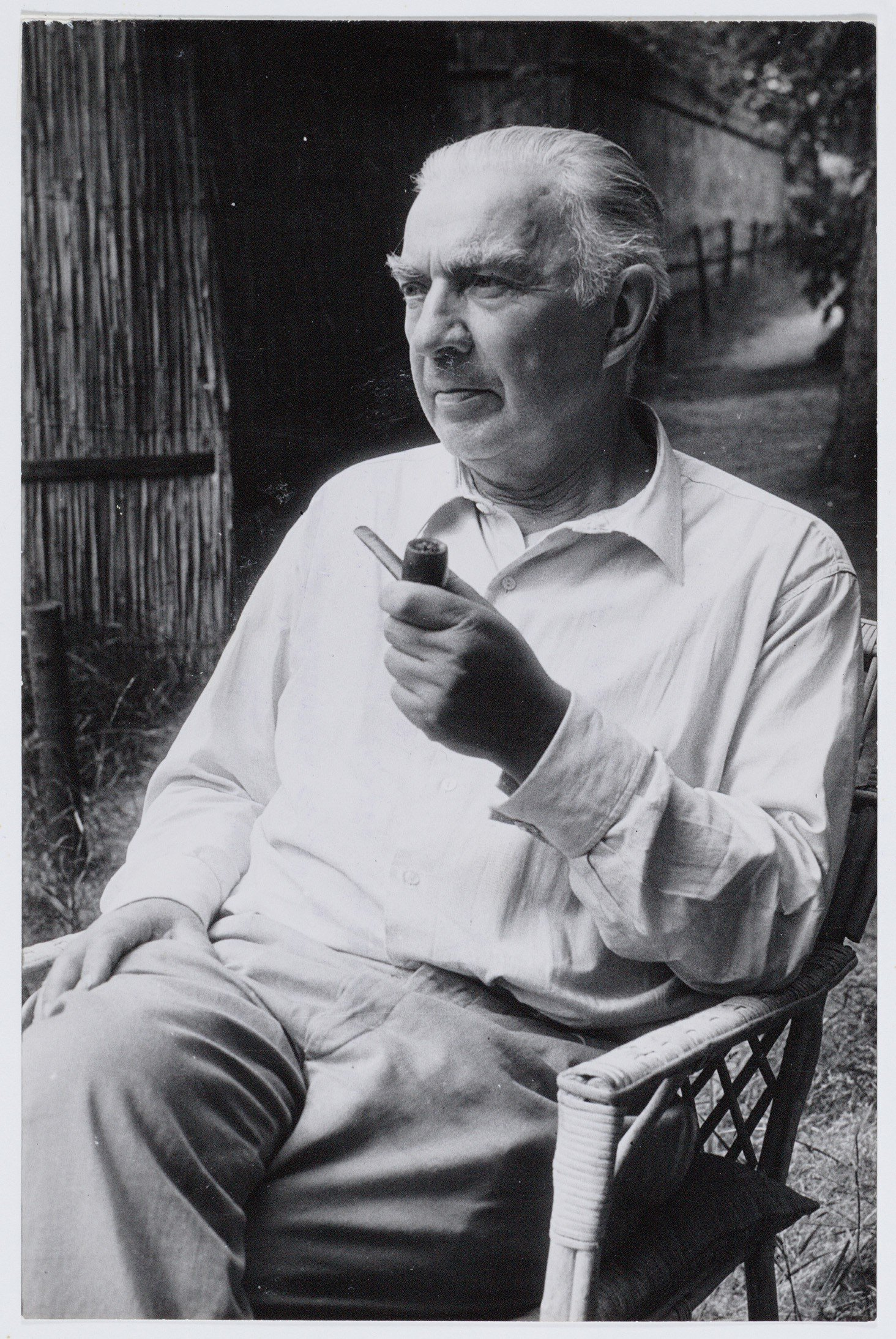
- Born: 5 September 1885; Amsterdam
- Died: 12 January 1956 (aged 70); Amsterdam
- Occupation: Painter, sculptor, drawer, visual artist, illustrator, graphic artist, pastellist, lithographer
- Children: Han Rädecker

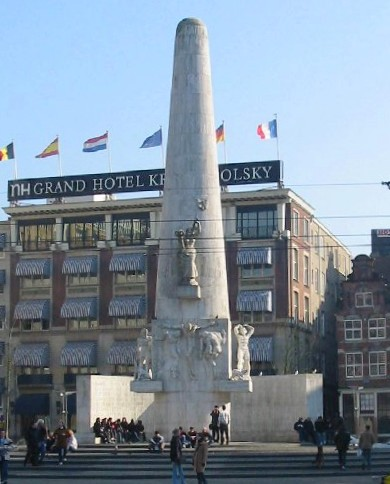
Amsterdam national monument on the dam

John Rädecker (5 December 1885, Amsterdam – 12 January 1956, Amsterdam) was a painter and sculptor from the northern Netherlands, best known for his National Monument on the Dam.

== Biography ==
According to the RKD he was a pupil of Bart van Hove and a member of various painting societies such as the Hollandse Aquarellisten Kring and the Haarlem-based De Groep, as well as being a sculptor. The Teylers Museum has a portrait of his daughter by his hand on show in their "Modern", or "Second" art gallery. He designed the National Monument and asked Adriaan Roland Holst to write the poem at the base. When he died, the monument was finished by his sons Johan ("Han") and Jan Willem.

== Public collections ==
Among the public collections holding works by John Rädecker are:

- Museum de Fundatie, Zwolle, The Netherlands
- Teylers Museum
- Amsterdamse School Museum Het Schip, Amsterdam, Netherlands
