= Teylers Tweede Schilderijenzaal =

Teylers Museum rooms

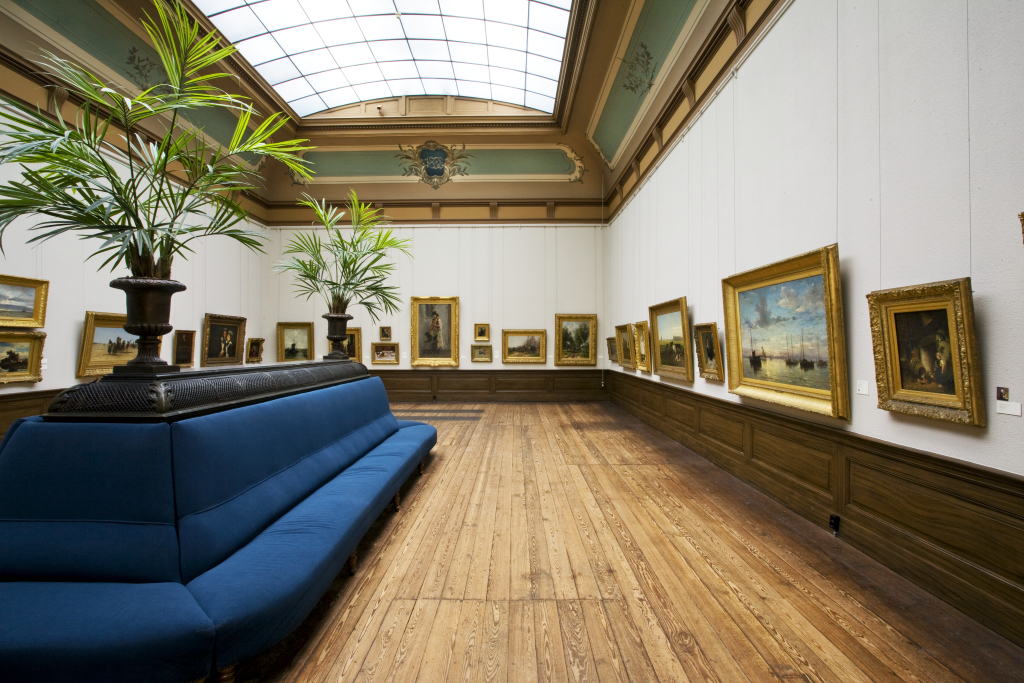
Tweede Schilderijenzaal

The Tweede Schilderijenzaal, or Painting Gallery II, is one of two art gallery rooms in Teylers Museum. The Tweede Schilderijenzaal was built in 1893 as an extension of the first gallery.

== History ==
In 1884 the expansion of the museum, called "Nieuwe Museum" (New Museum), with the addition of the entrance on the Spaarne and the new Fossil rooms, had just been completed to commemorate 100 years of exhibits in the Oval Room. The only part of the museum that had not profited from the expansion was the painting gallery, and this was finally done in 1893 by the regular building crew that the museum kept on hand for renovations. The new gallery was not only meant for extra exhibition space on the walls, but tables were set up for print and drawing viewing in the portfolio holders, a practice which has been kept up until today, although the prints in the viewing portfolios are now copies rather than originals.

== Paintings ==
List of painters in alphabetical order, accompanied by an example hanging in the second gallery:

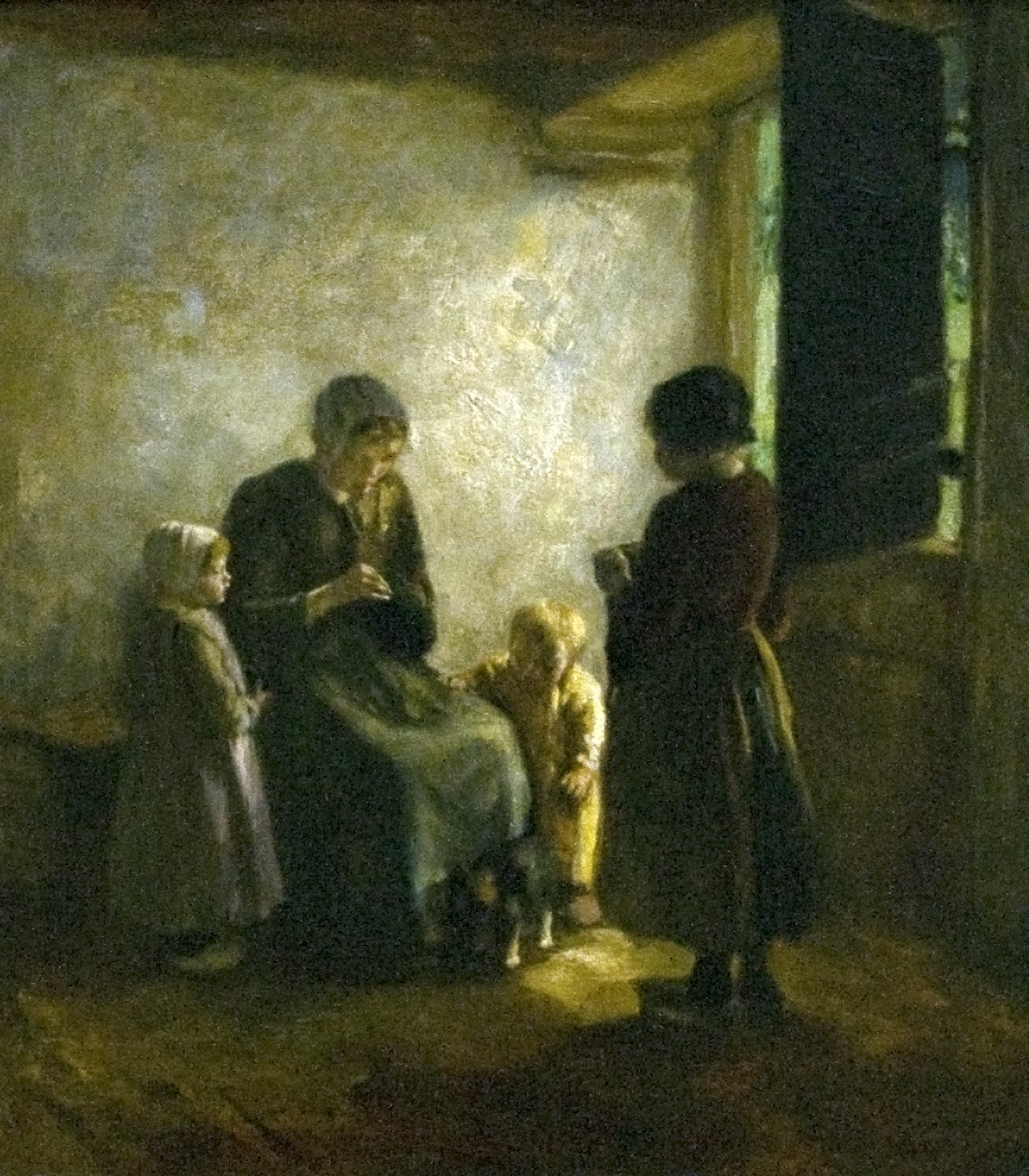
The open door, 1905, by Albert Neuhuys

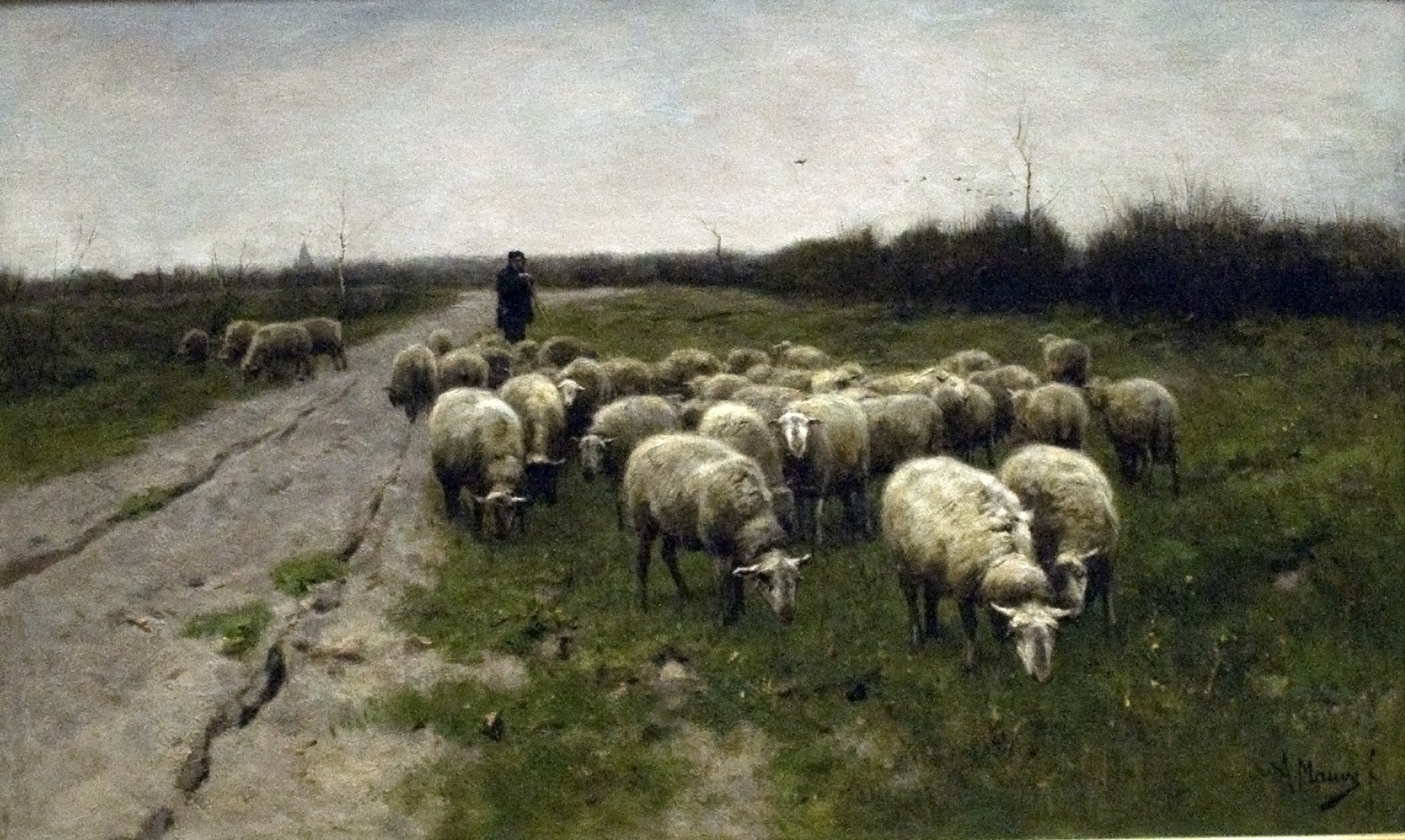
Sheepfold, 1880, by Anton Mauve

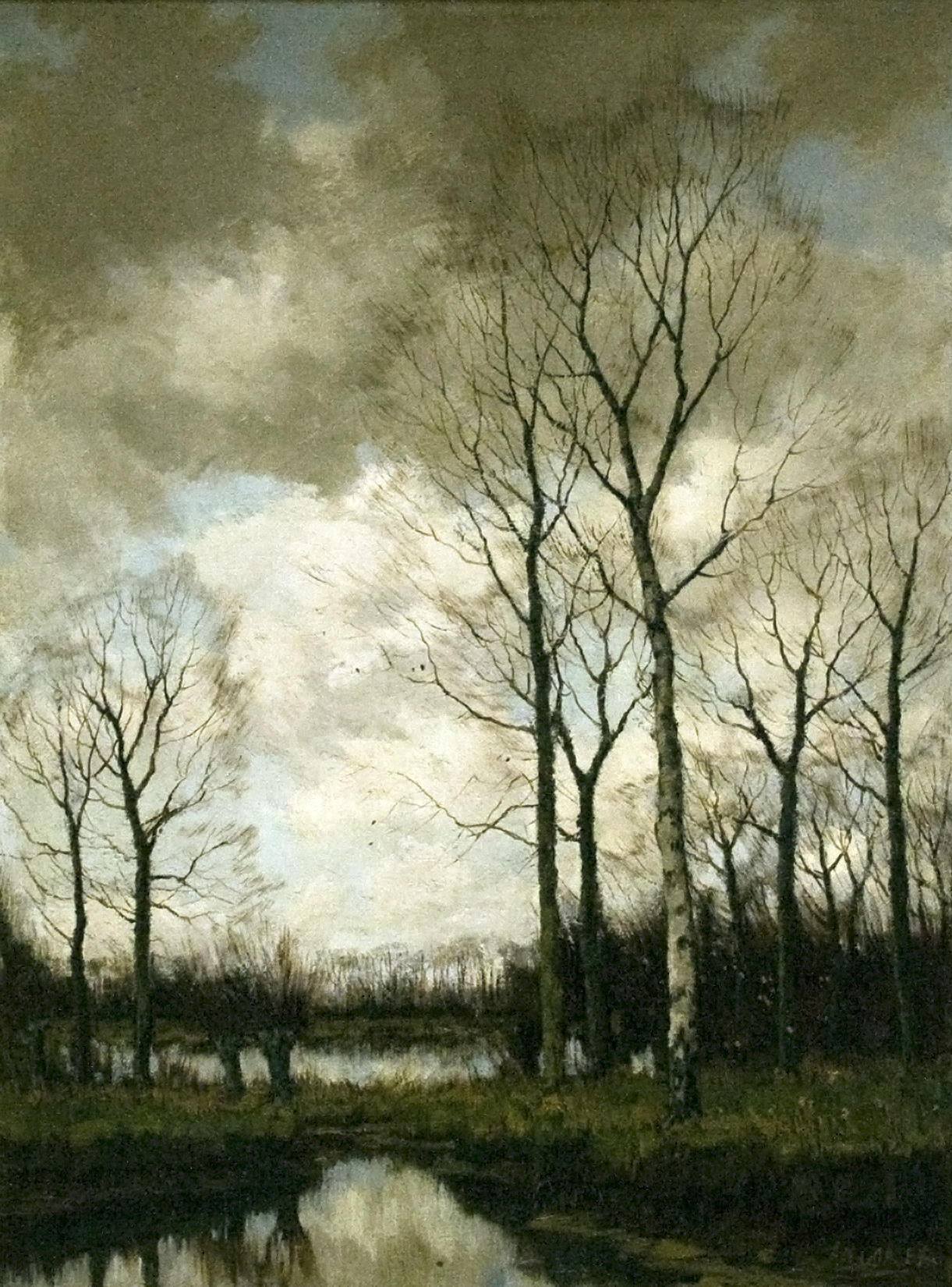
November mood, 1905, by Arnold Marc Gorter

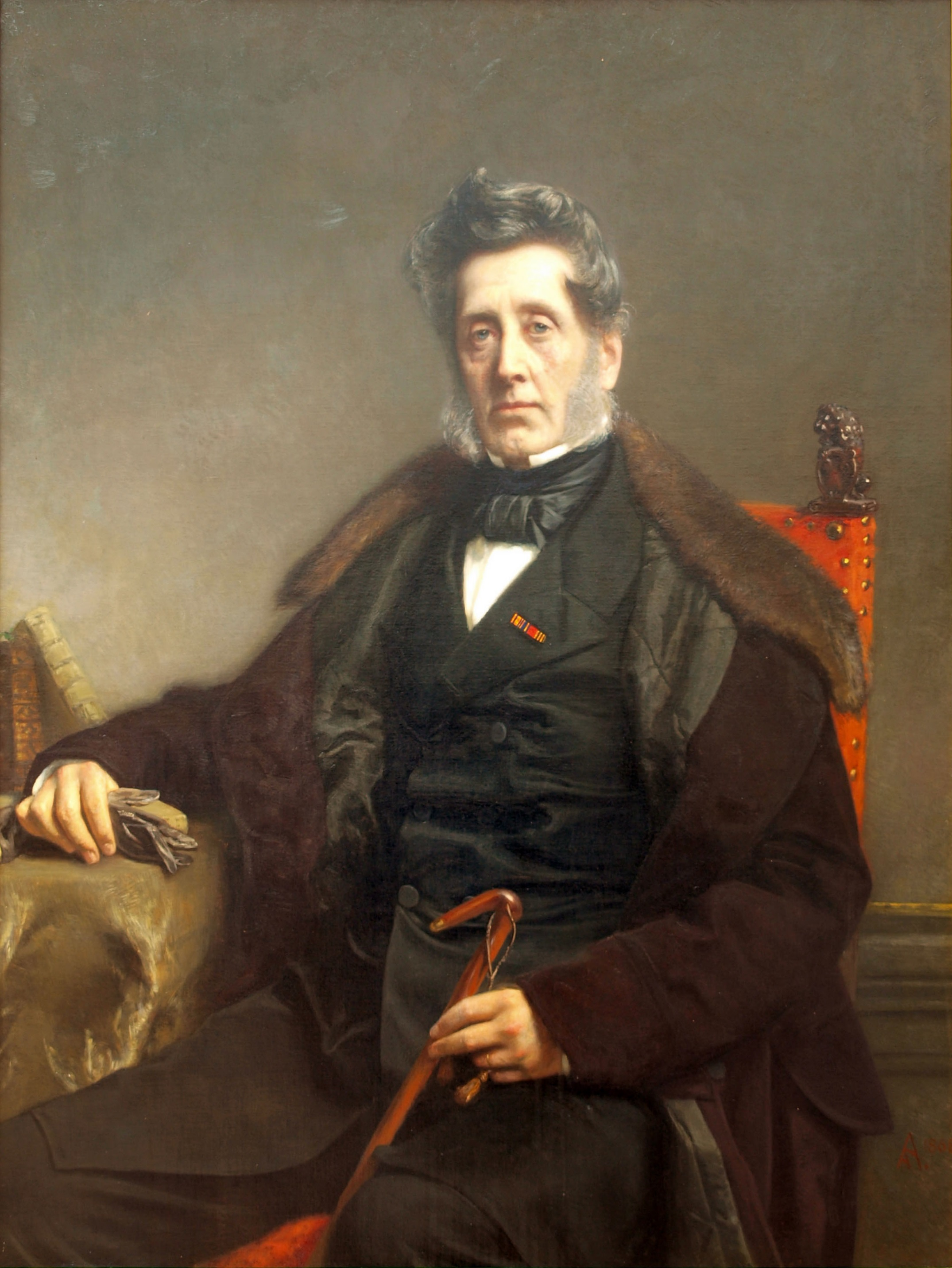
Portrait of Johannes Luden, 1868, by August Allebé

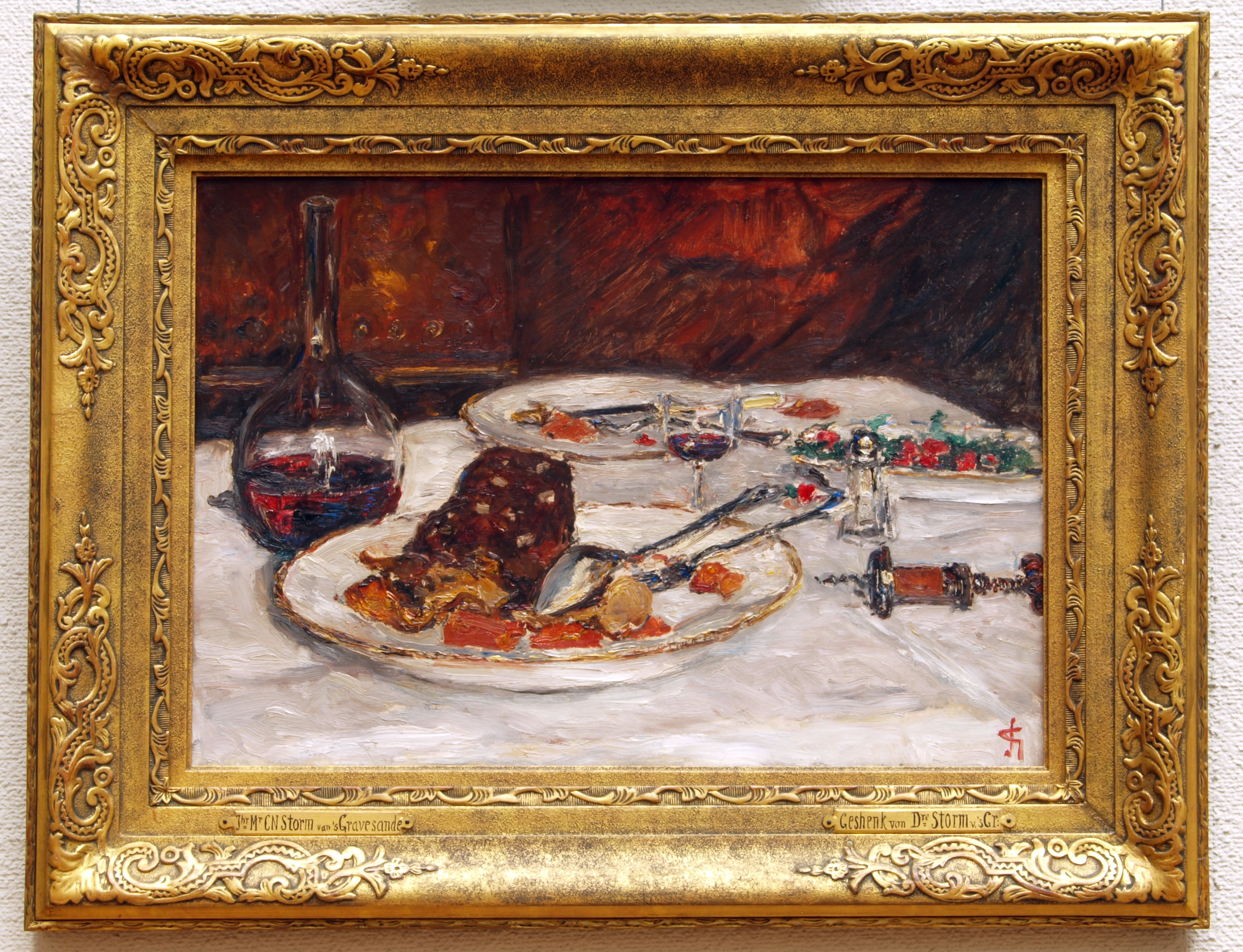
Still life "Boef à la mode", 1906, by Carel Nicolaas Storm van 's-Gravesande

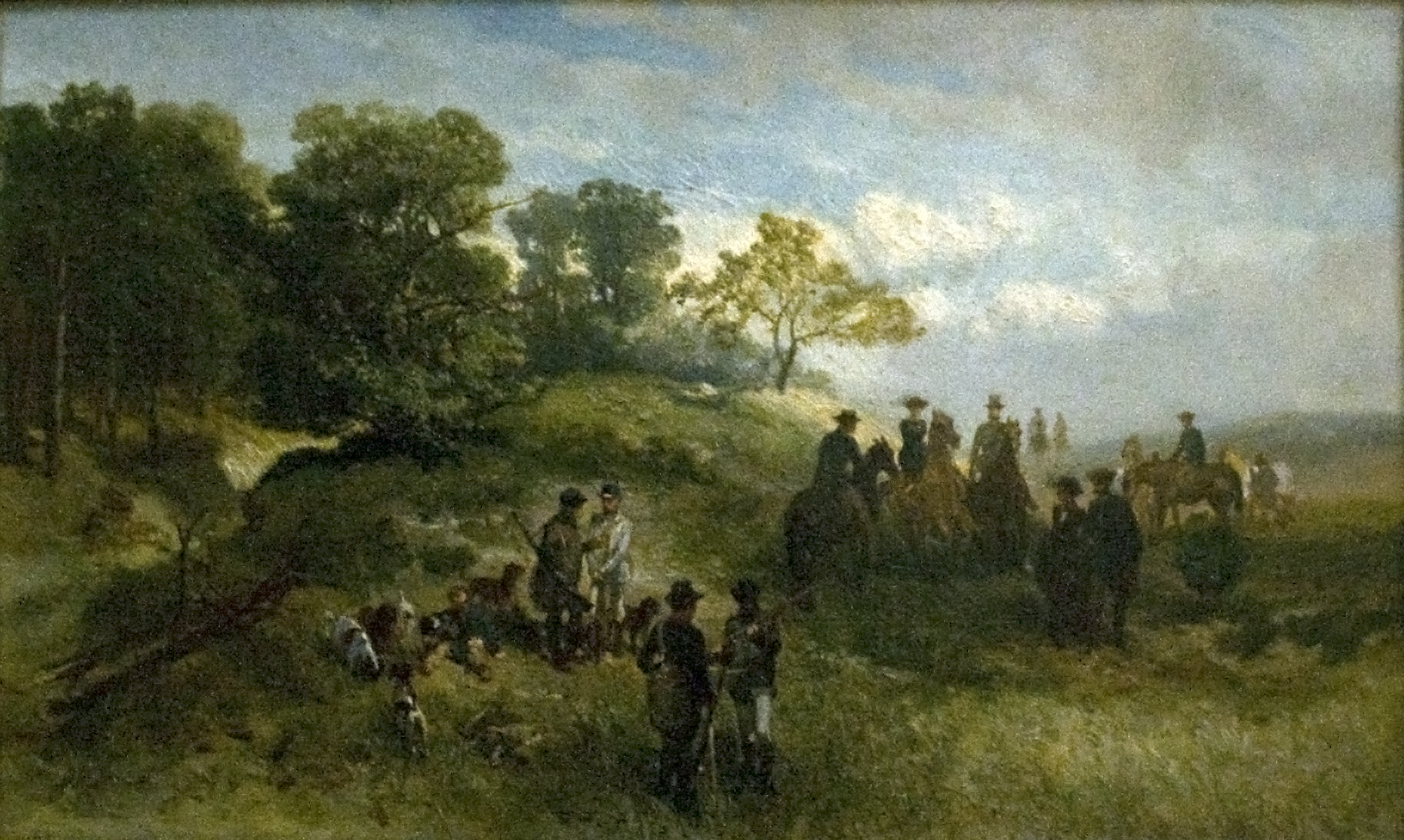
Hunting company, 1857, by Charles Rochussen

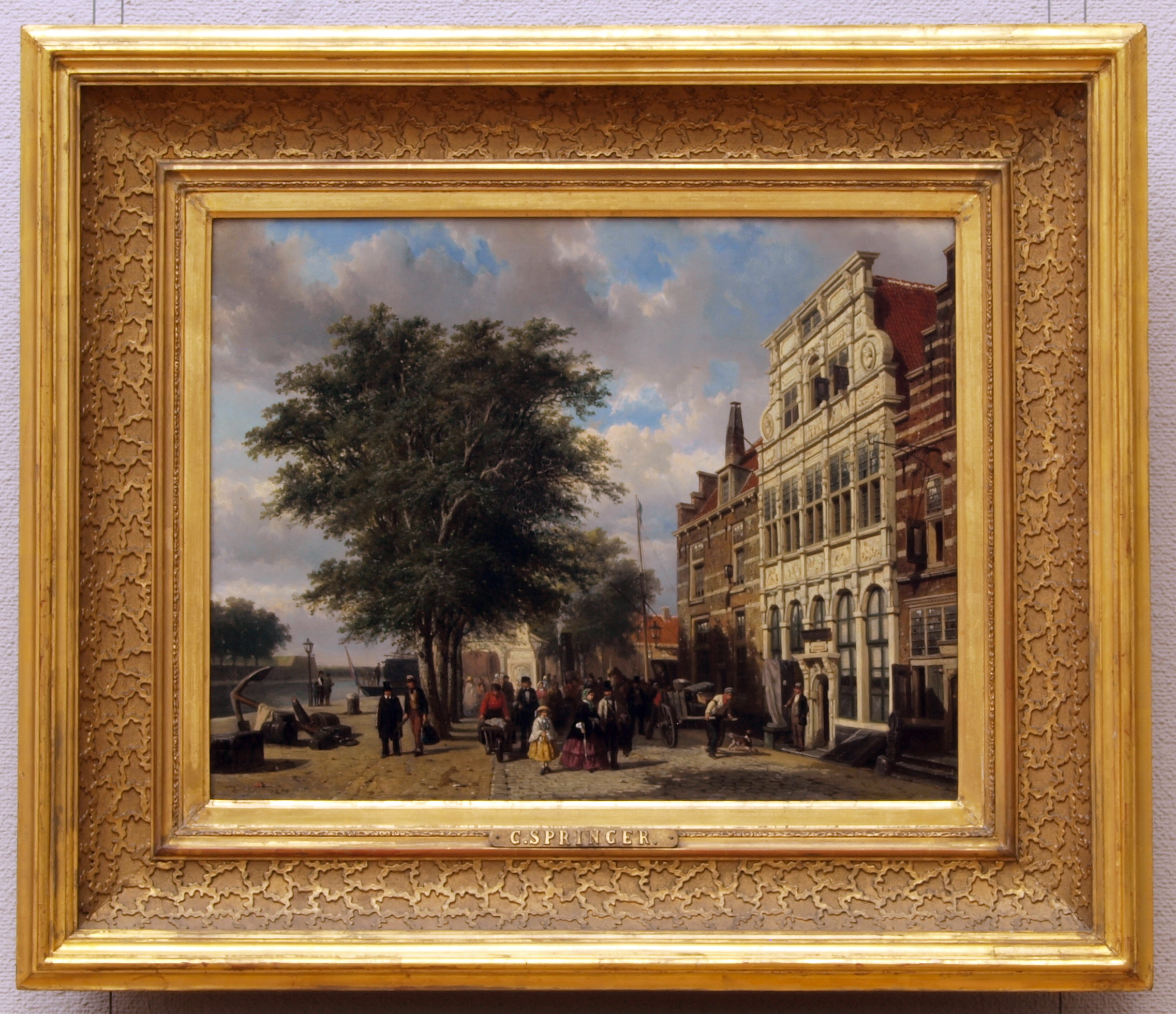
The port at Middelburg, 1859, by Cornelis Springer

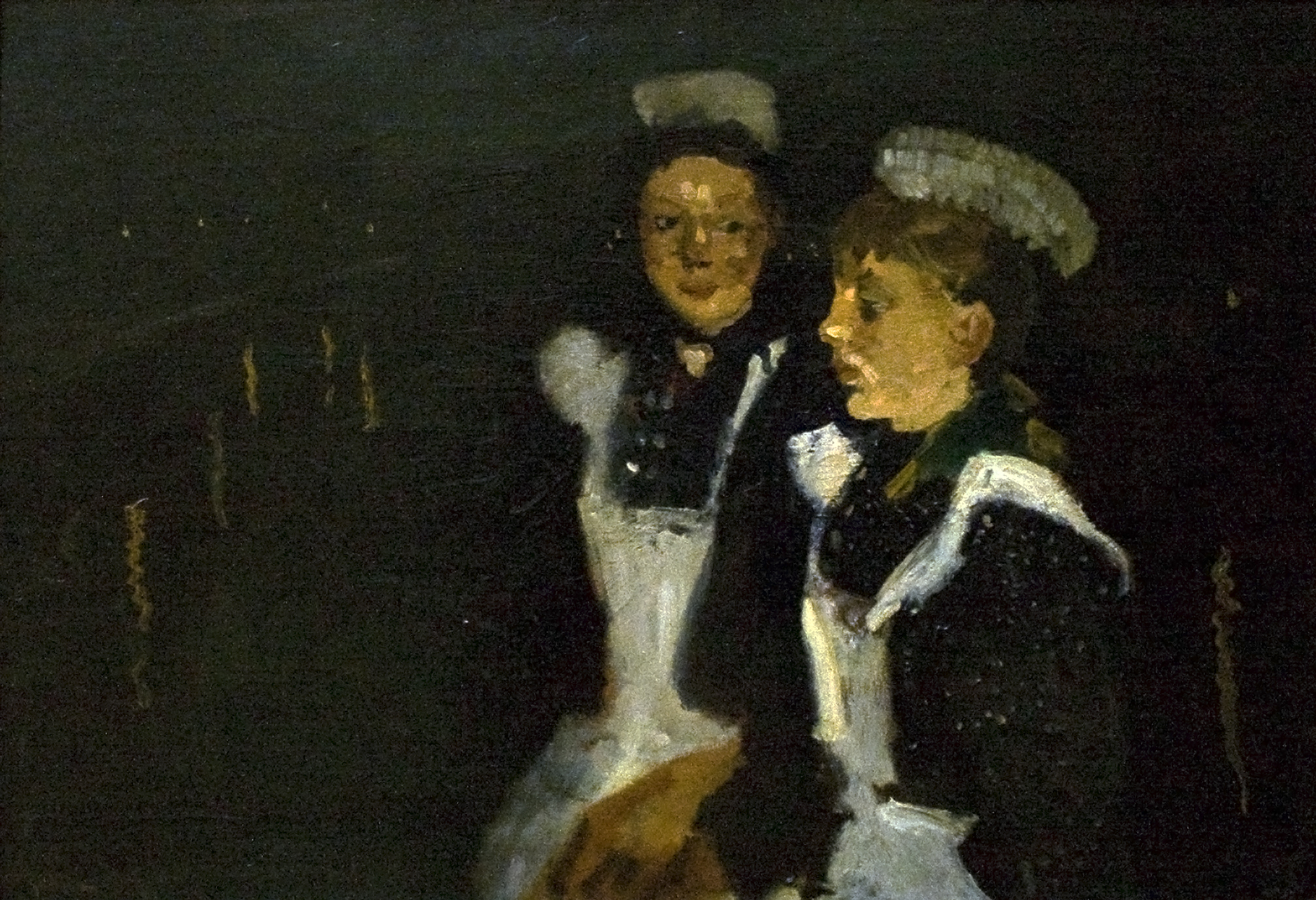
Two servants, 1890, by George Hendrik Breitner

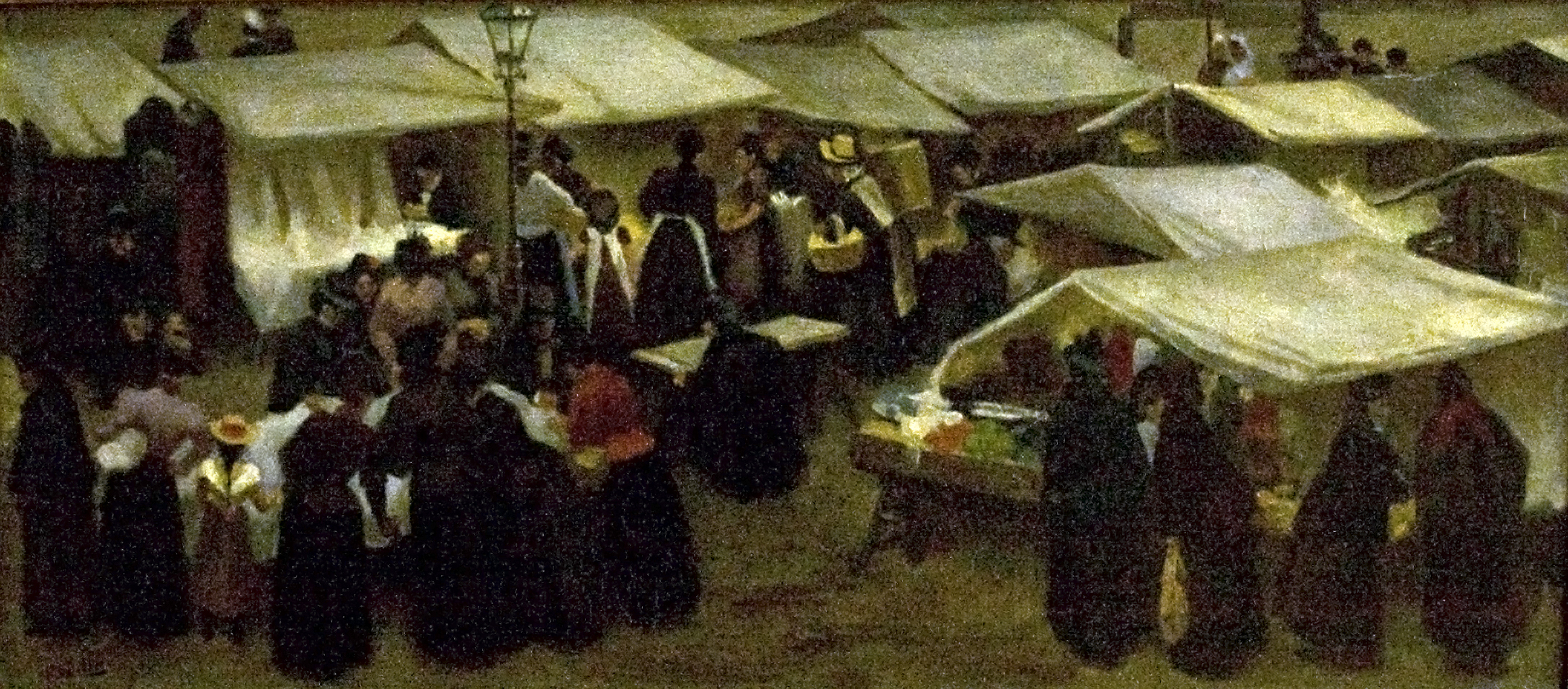
Nieuwmarkt in Amsterdam, 1897, by Hendrik Adriaan Christiaan Dekker

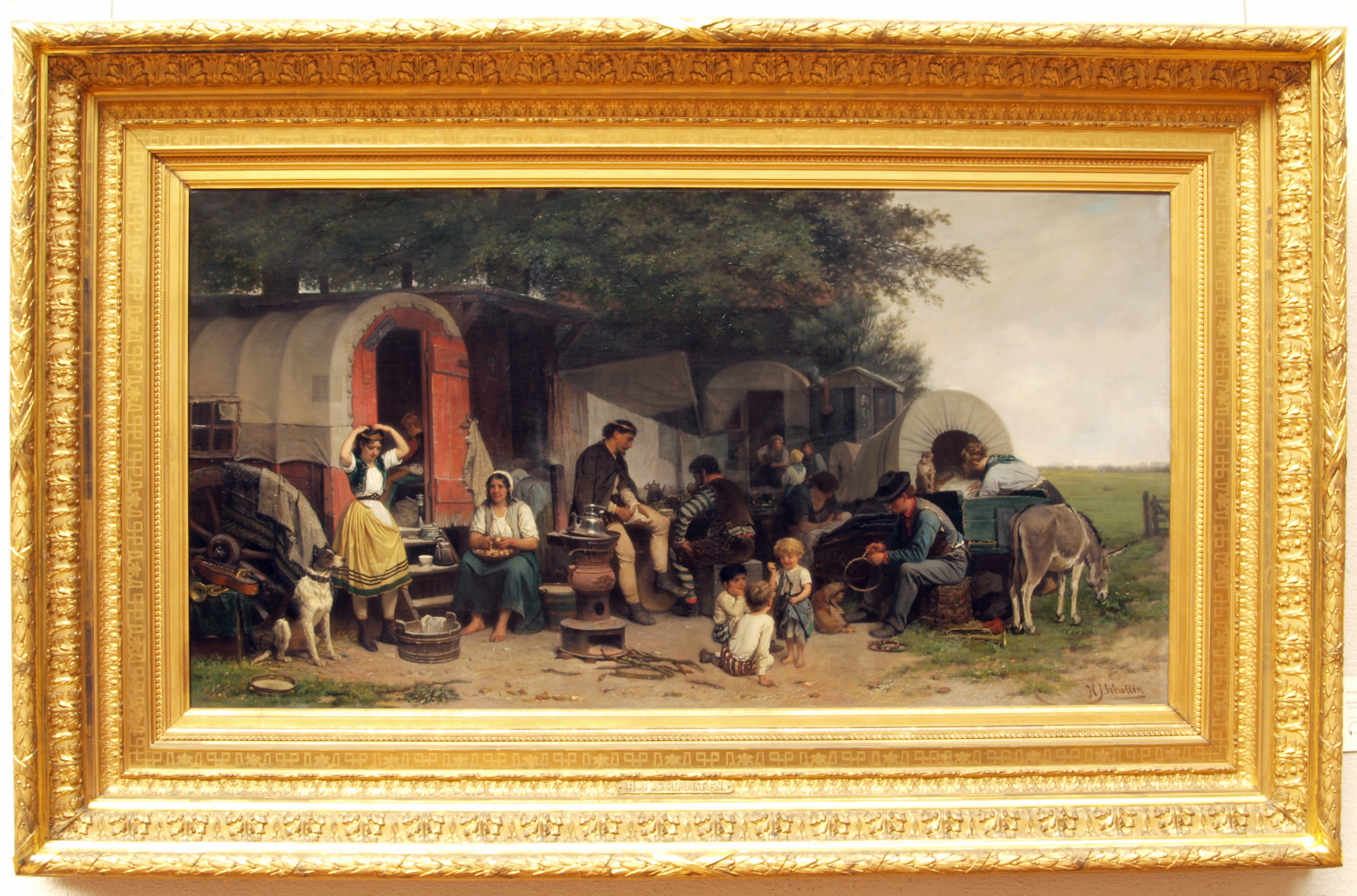
Circus guests, 1870, by Hendrik Jacobus Scholten

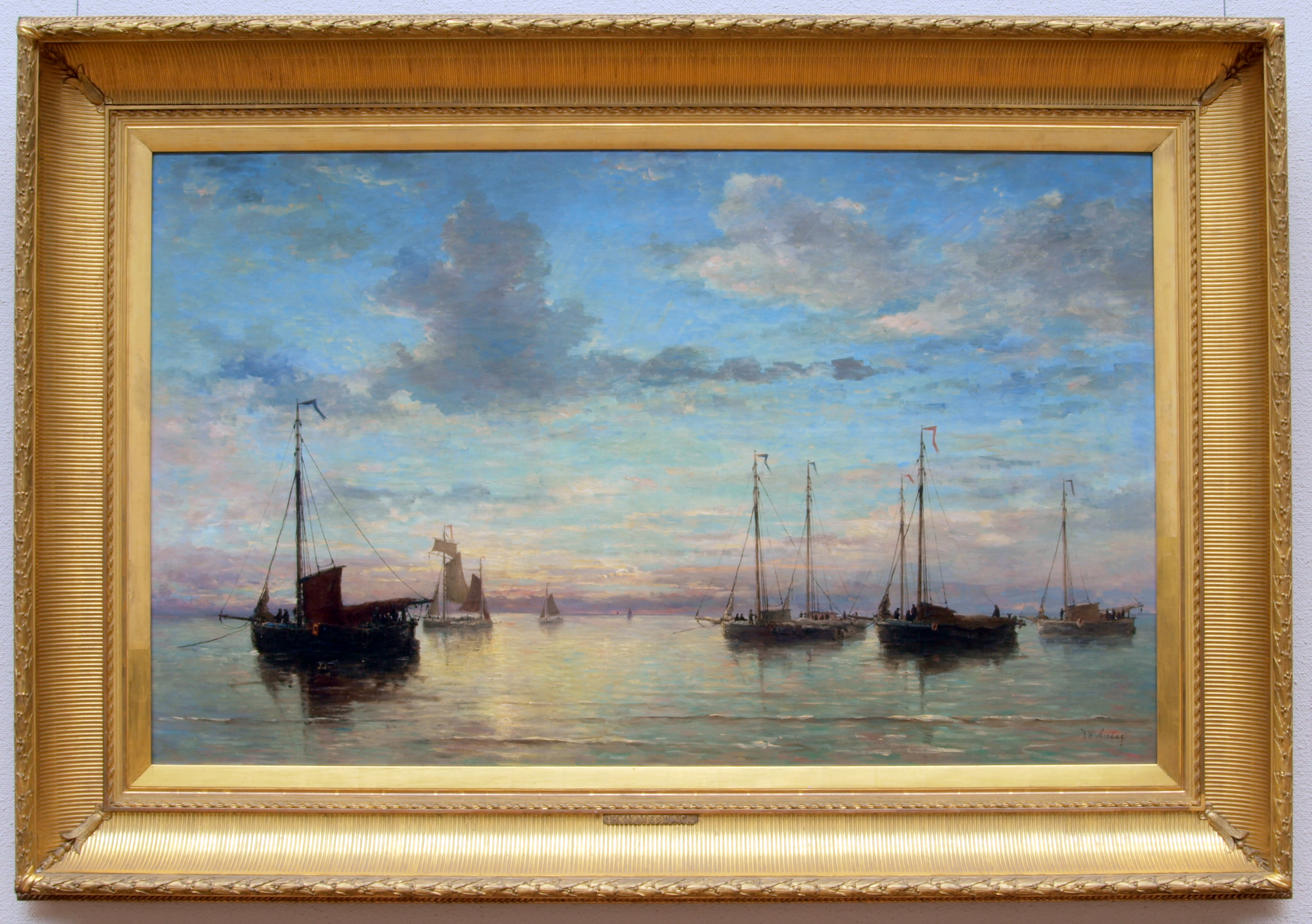
Sunset at sea, 1870, by Hendrik Willem Mesdag

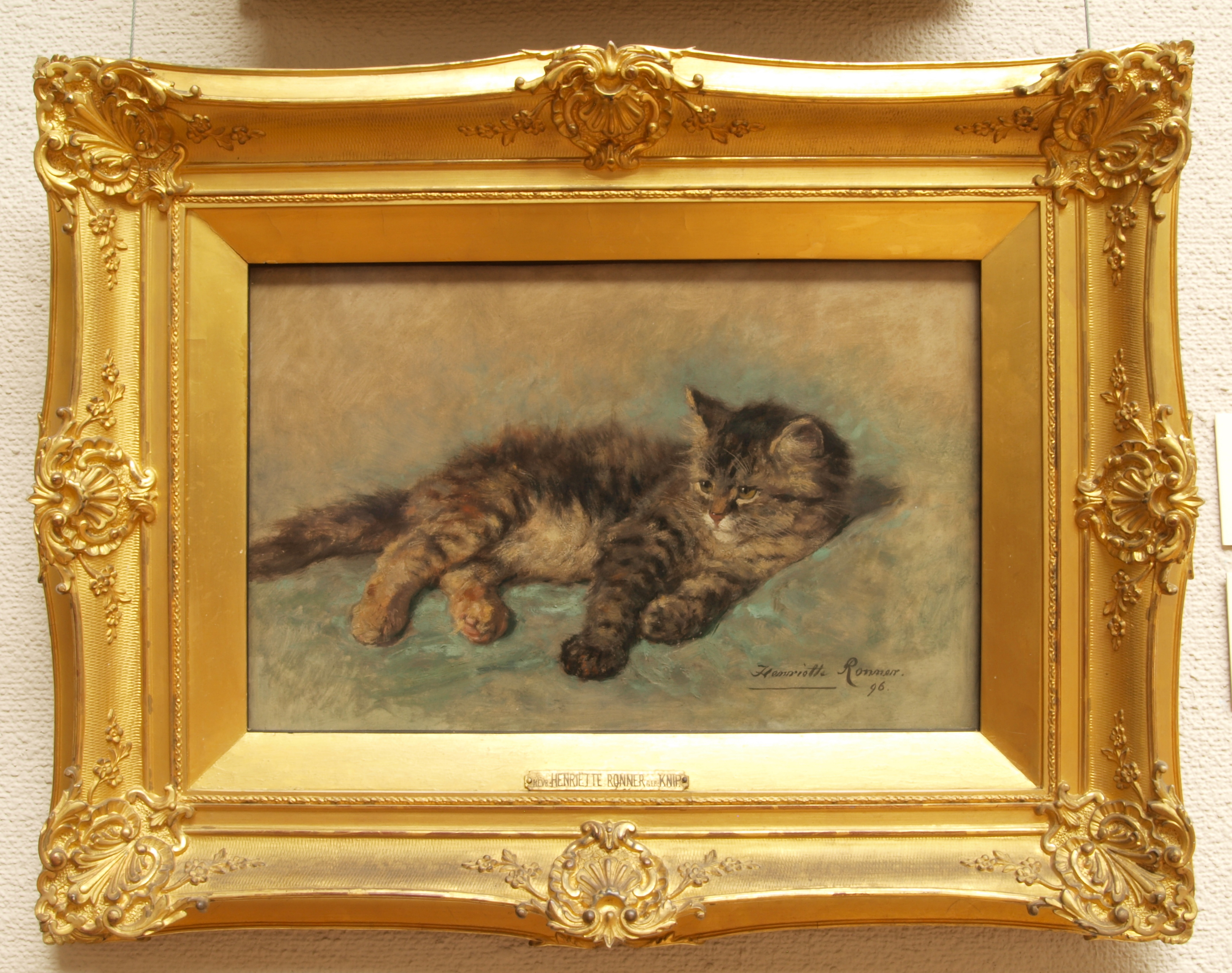
Cat, 1896, by Henriëtte Ronner-Knip

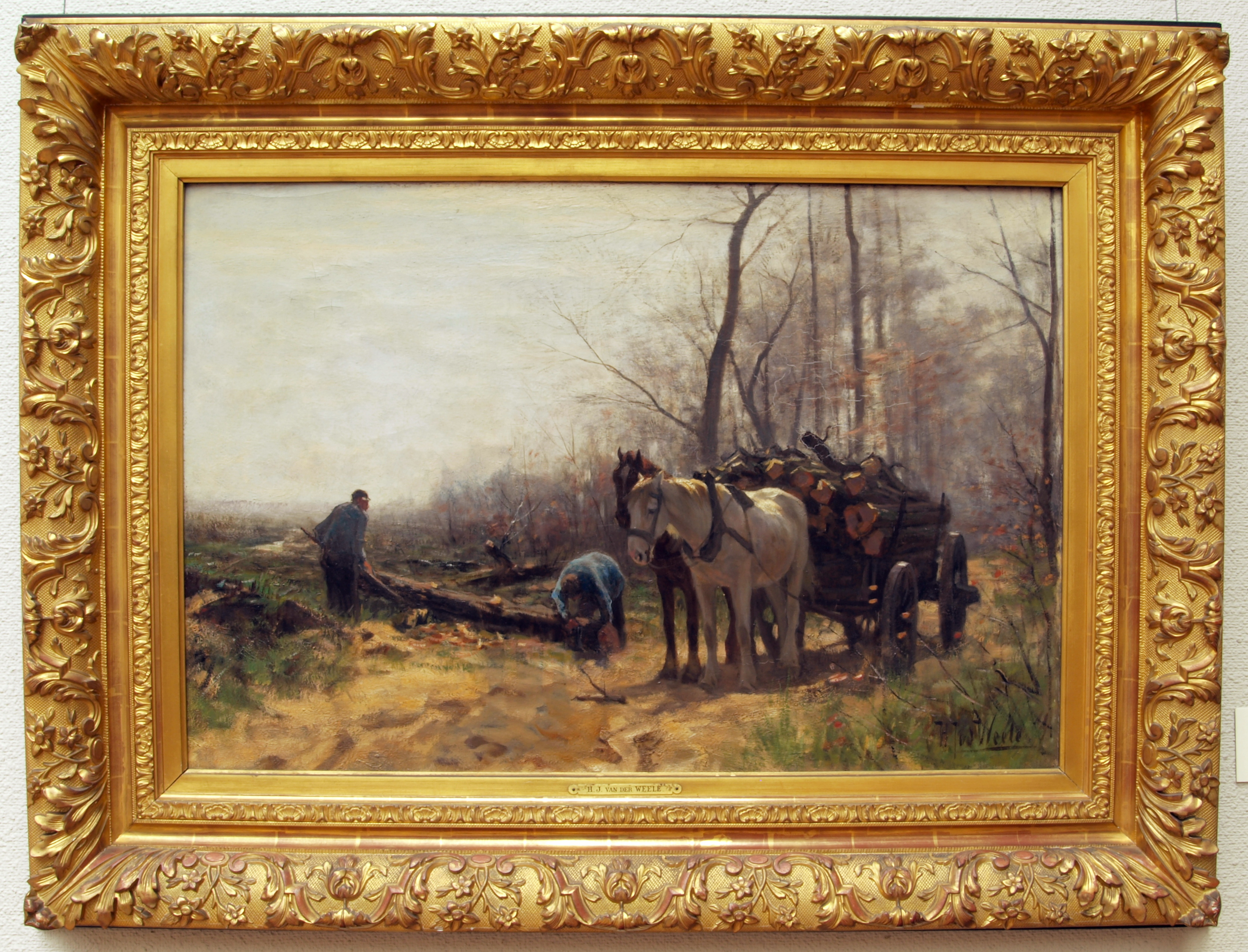
Loading wood, 1890, by Herman Johannes van der Weele

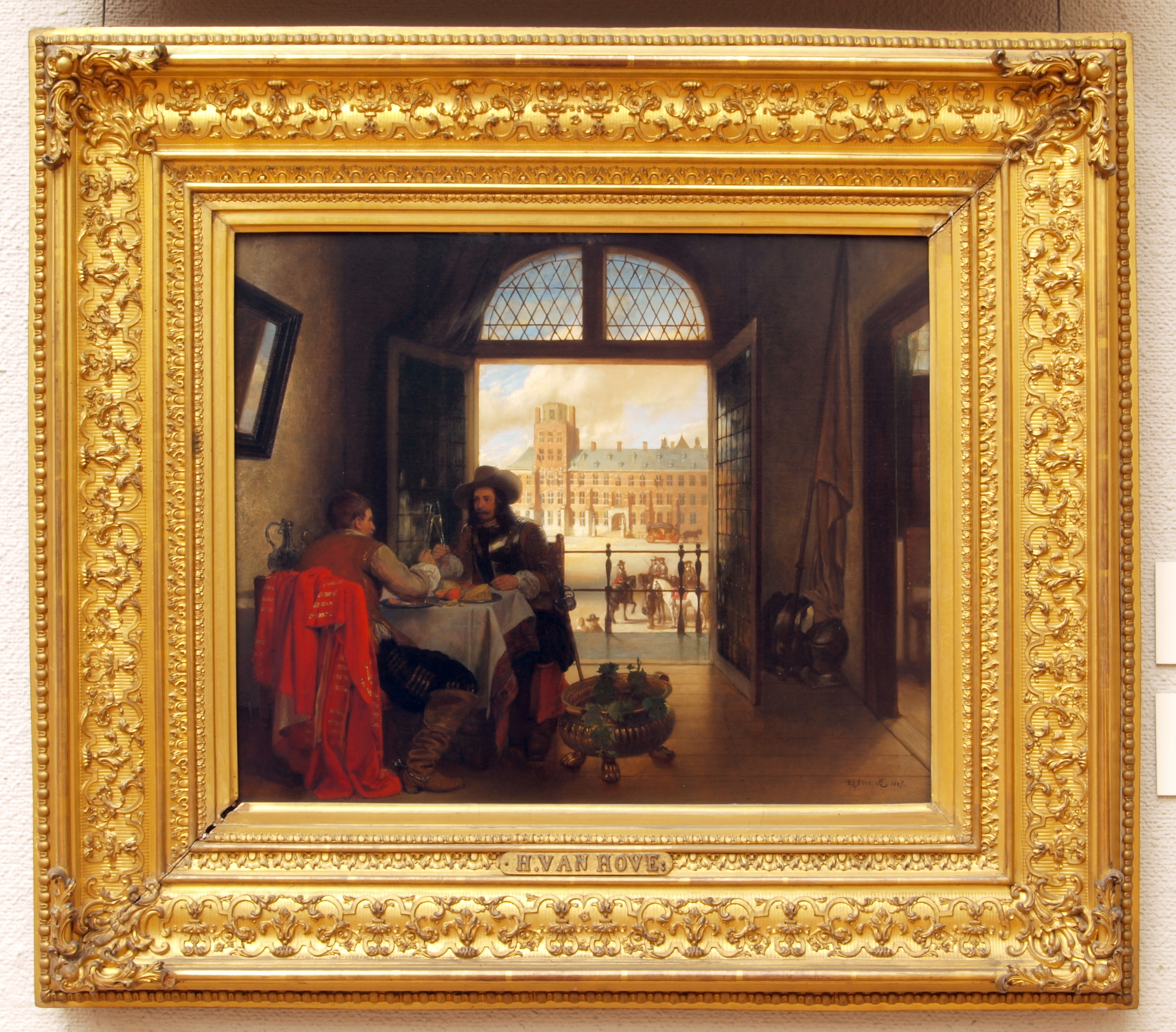
The Farewell, 1847, by Hubertus van Hove

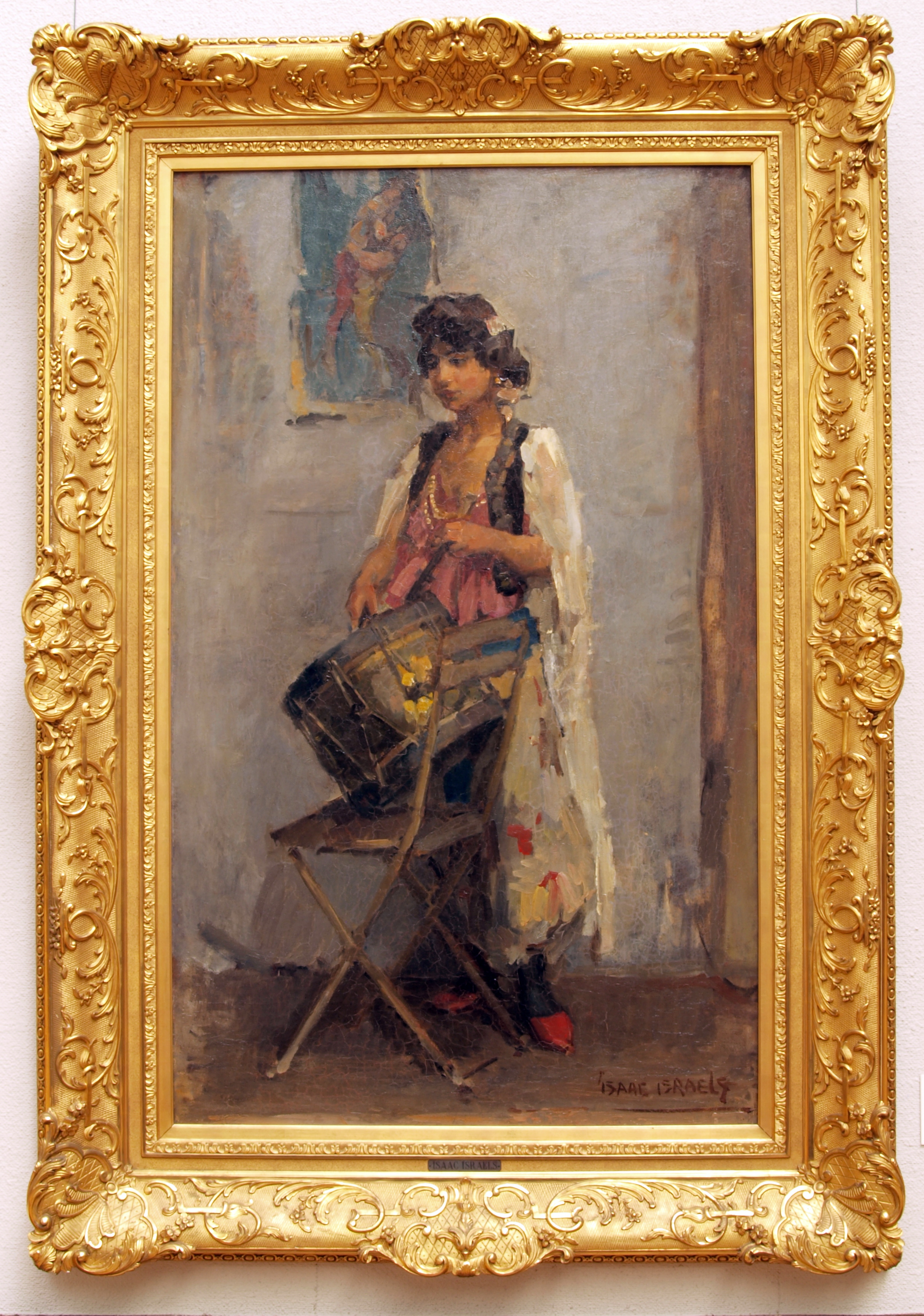
Drummer girl, 1908, by Isaac Israëls

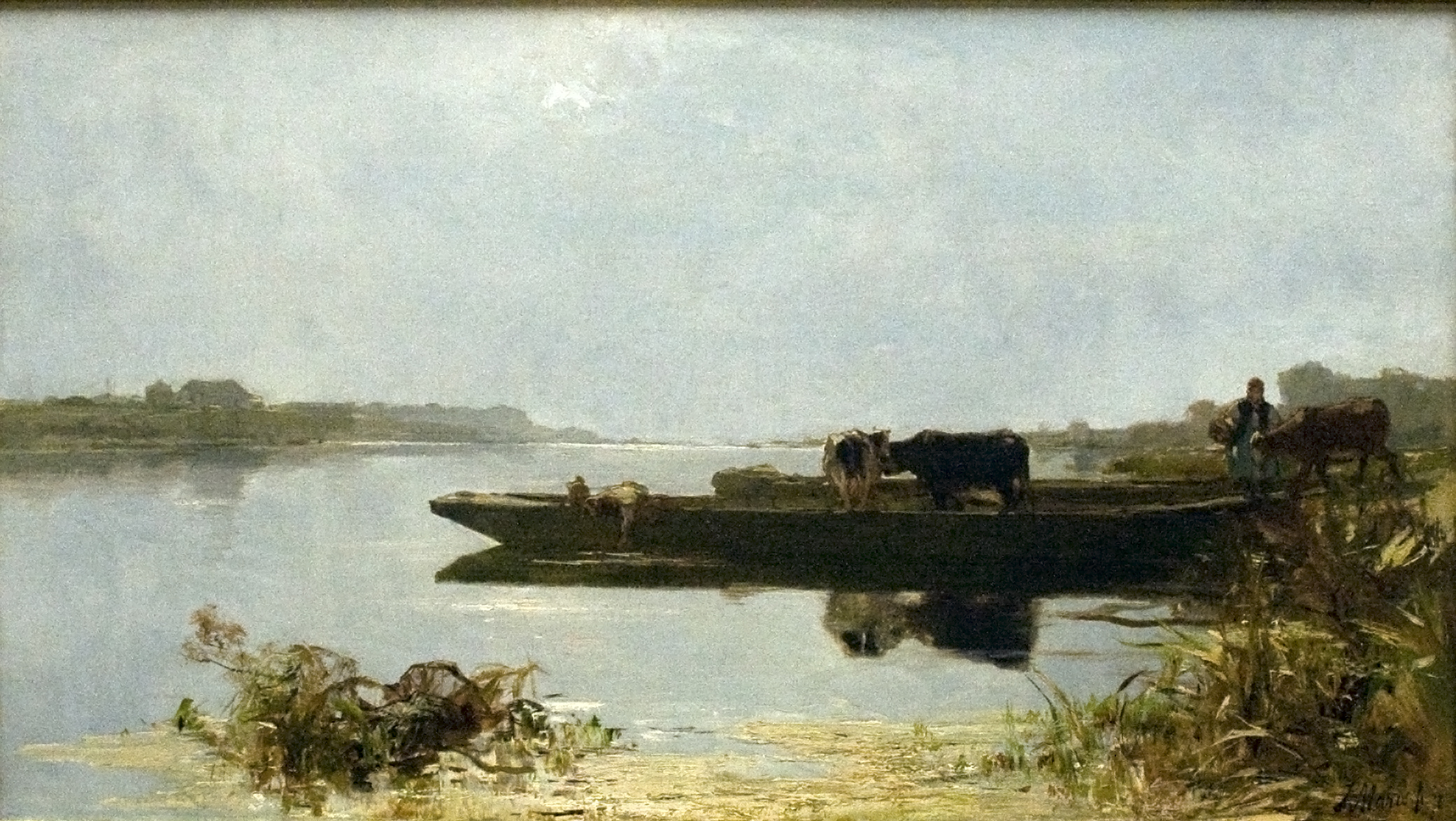
The ferry boat, 1870, by Jacob Maris

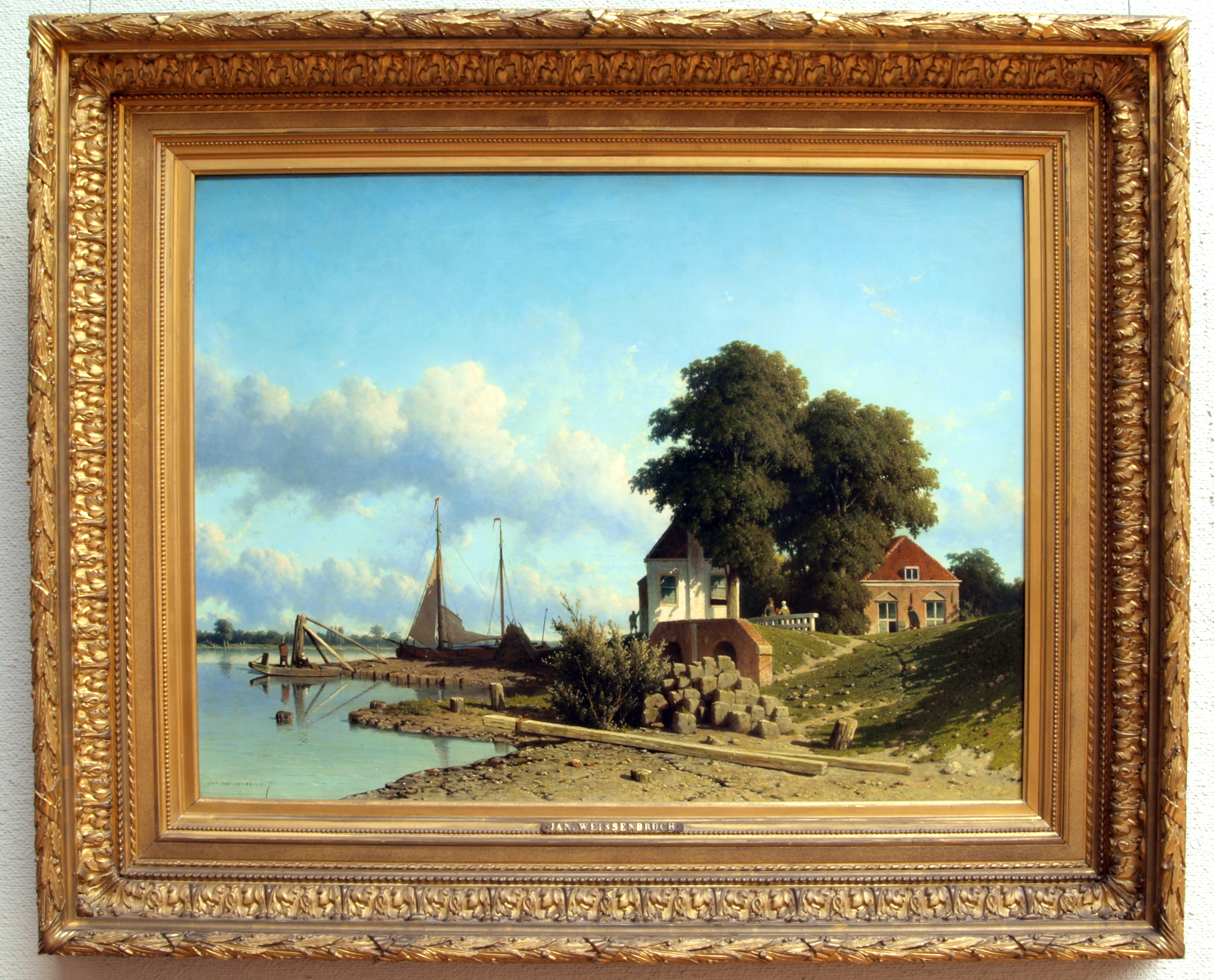
By the Lek at Elshout, 1850–1854, by Jan Weissenbruch

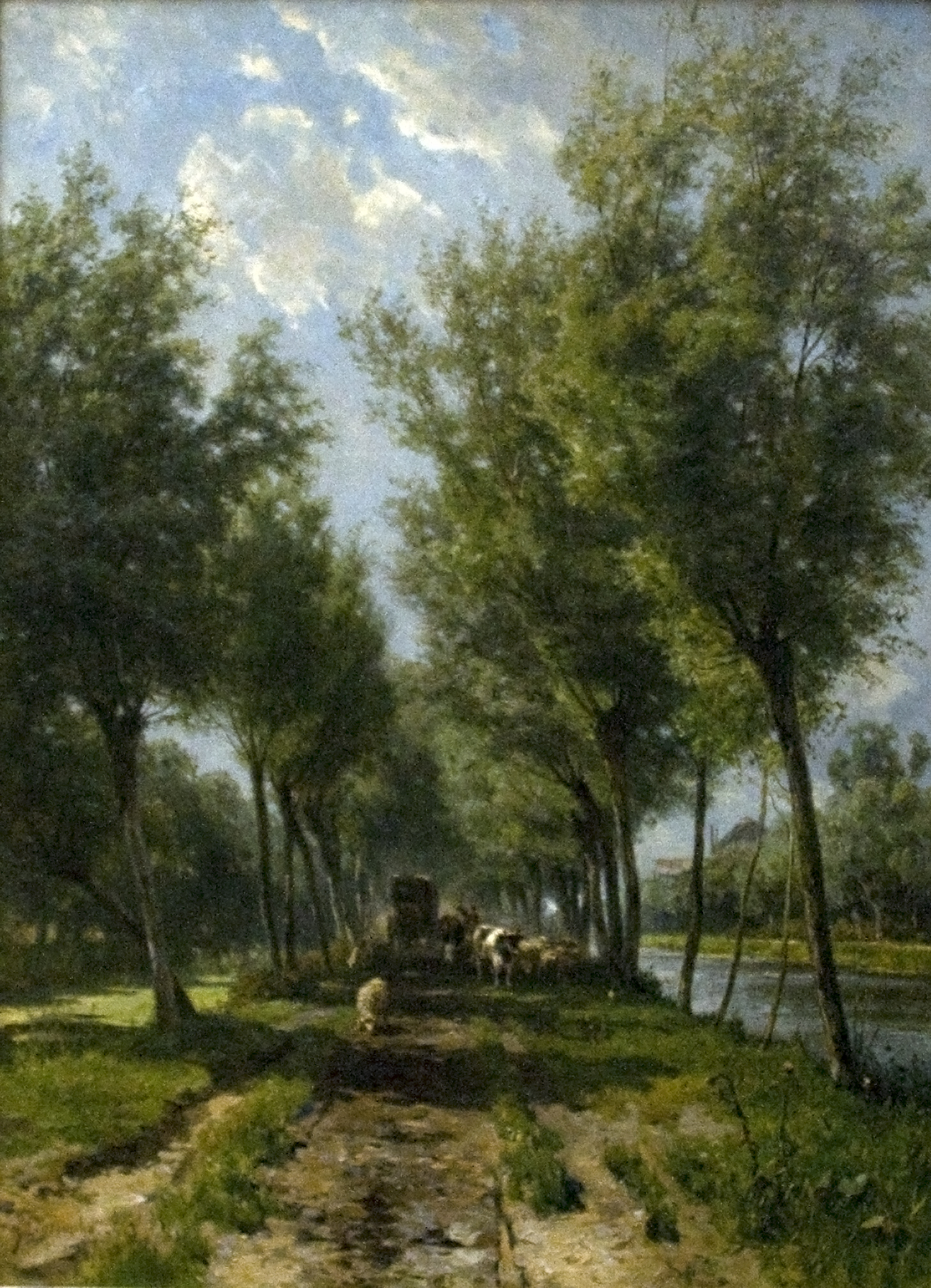
The road to Polsbroekerdam, 1860, by Jan Willem van Borselen

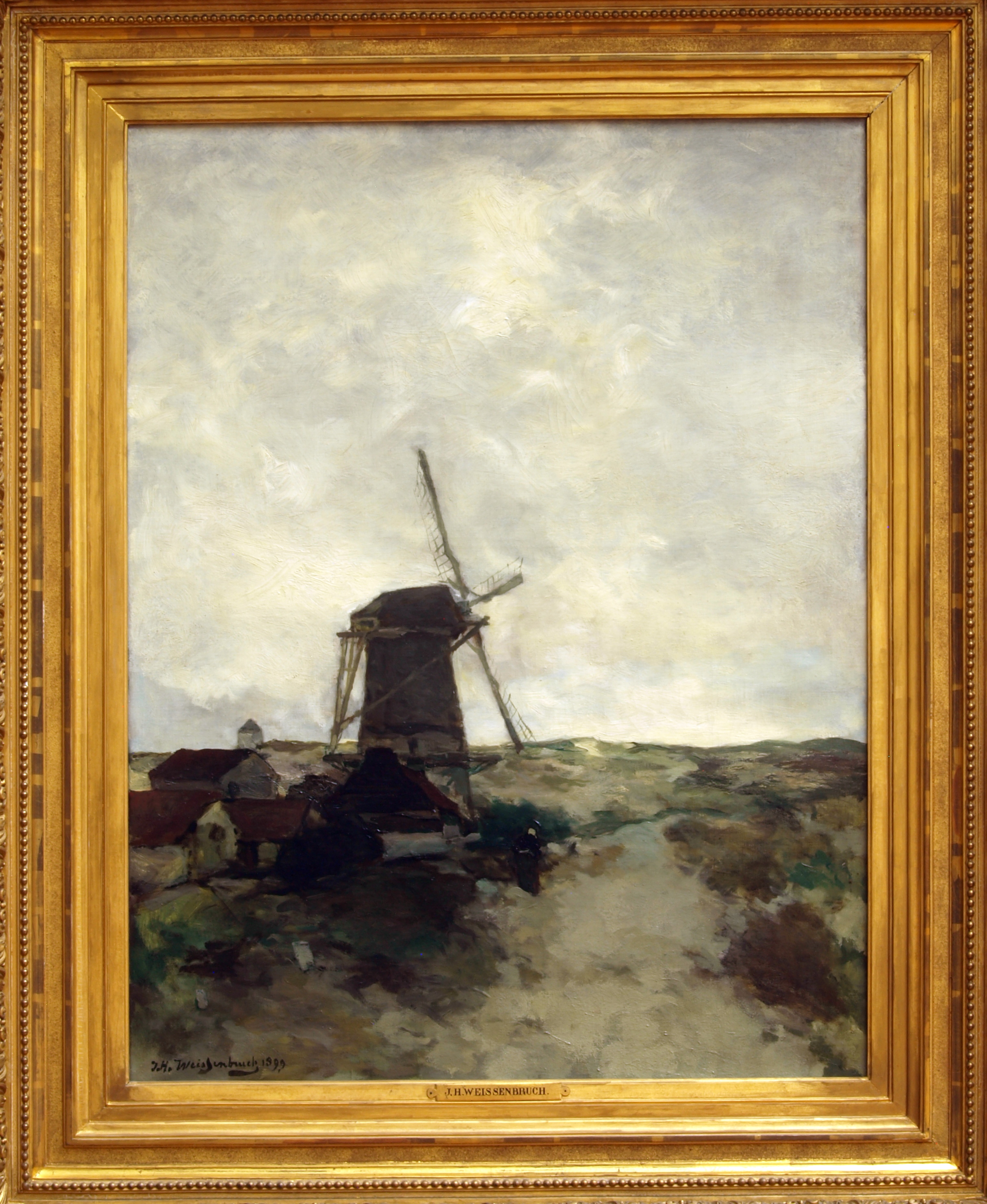
The mill, 1899, by Jan Hendrik Weissenbruch

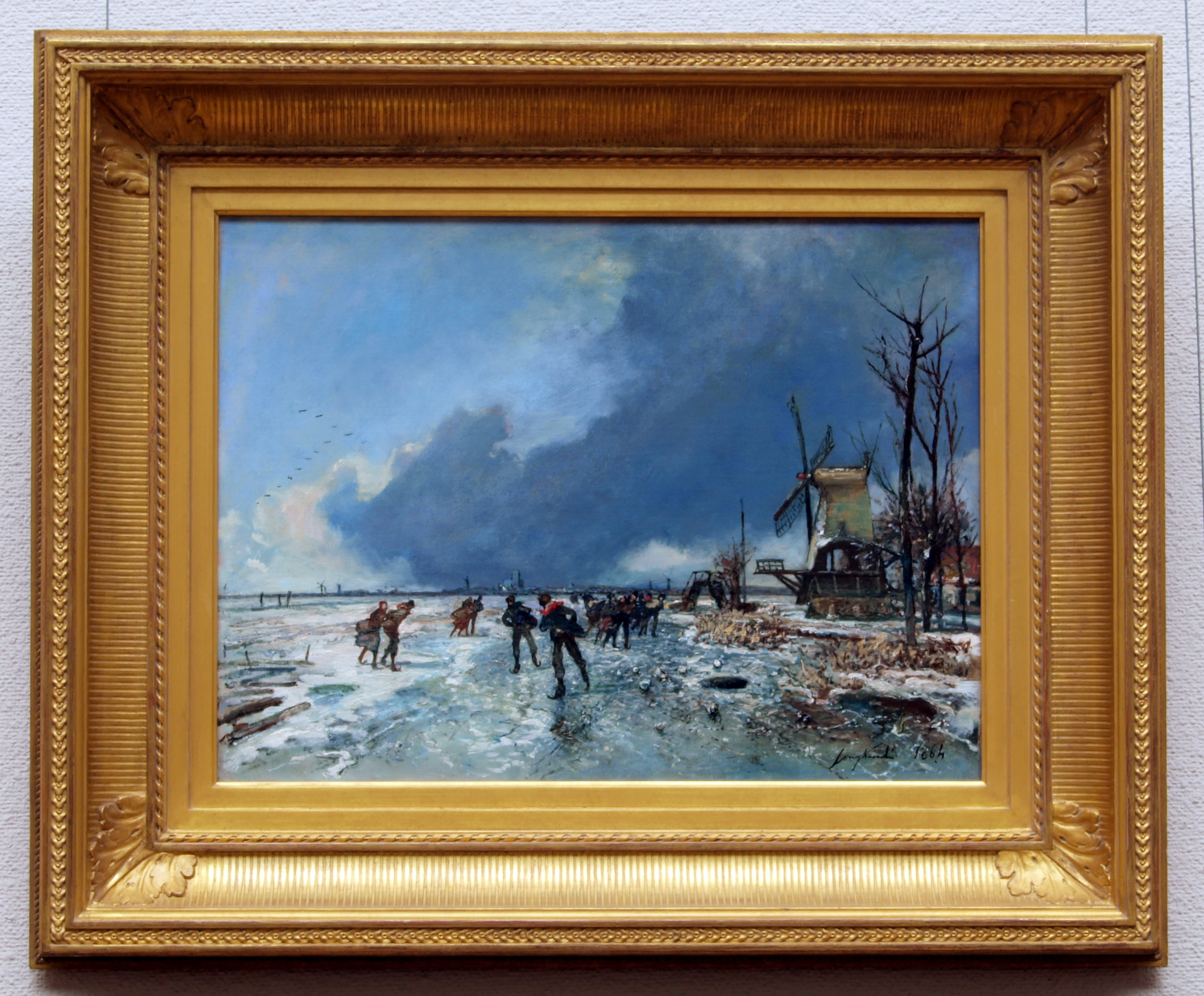
Winter landscape with skaters, 1864, by Johan Jongkind

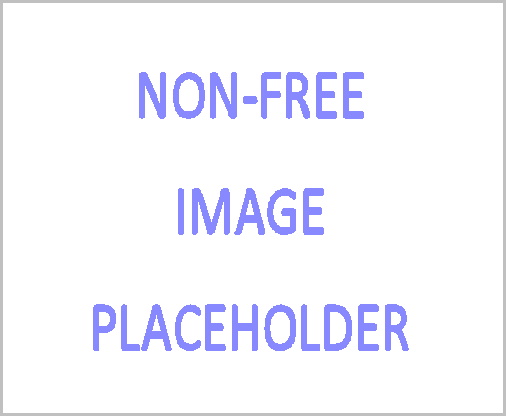
Street singers, 1928, by Johan van Hell

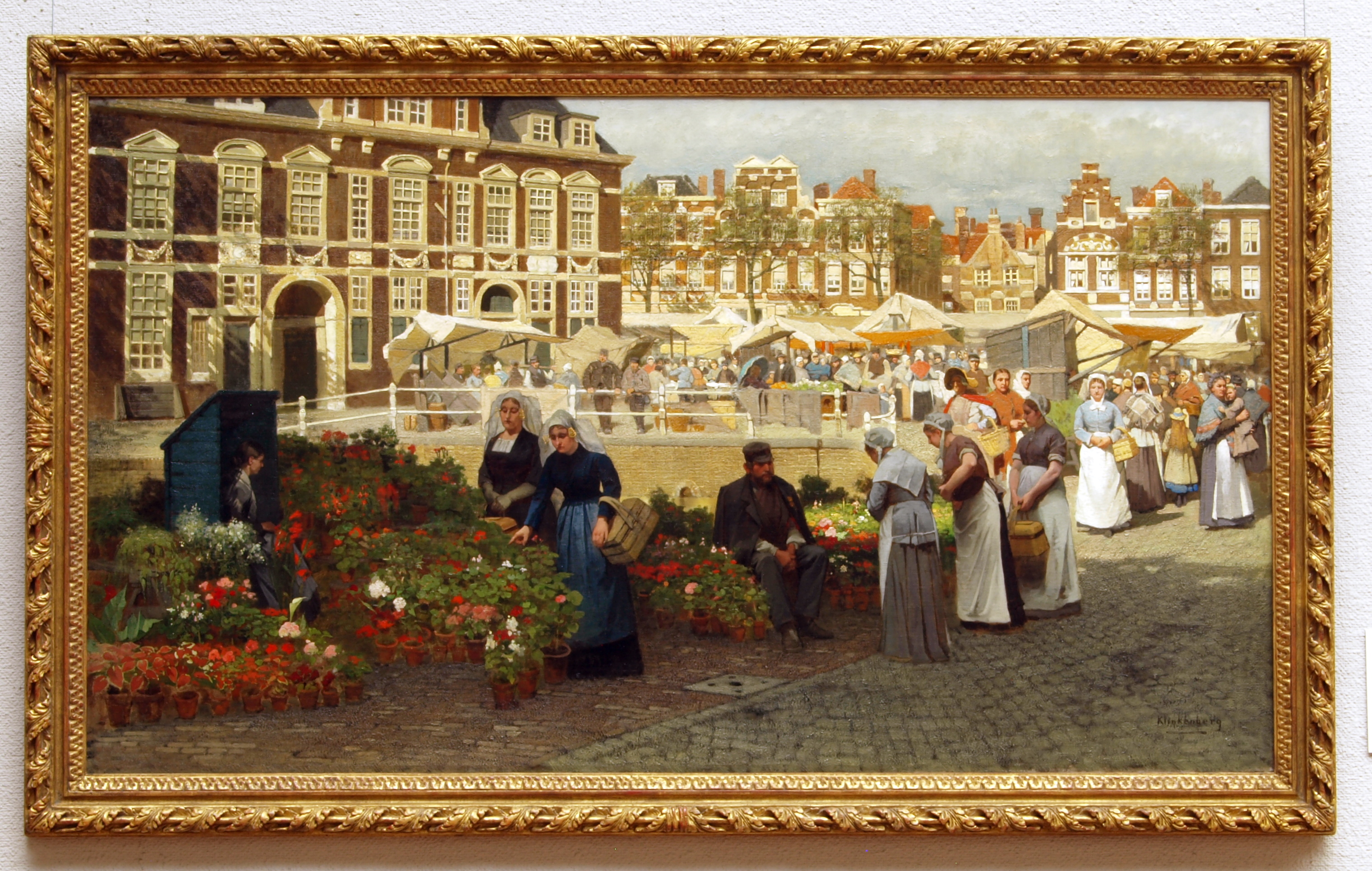
Flower Market in the Hague, c. 1880–1904, by Johannes Christiaan Karel Klinkenberg

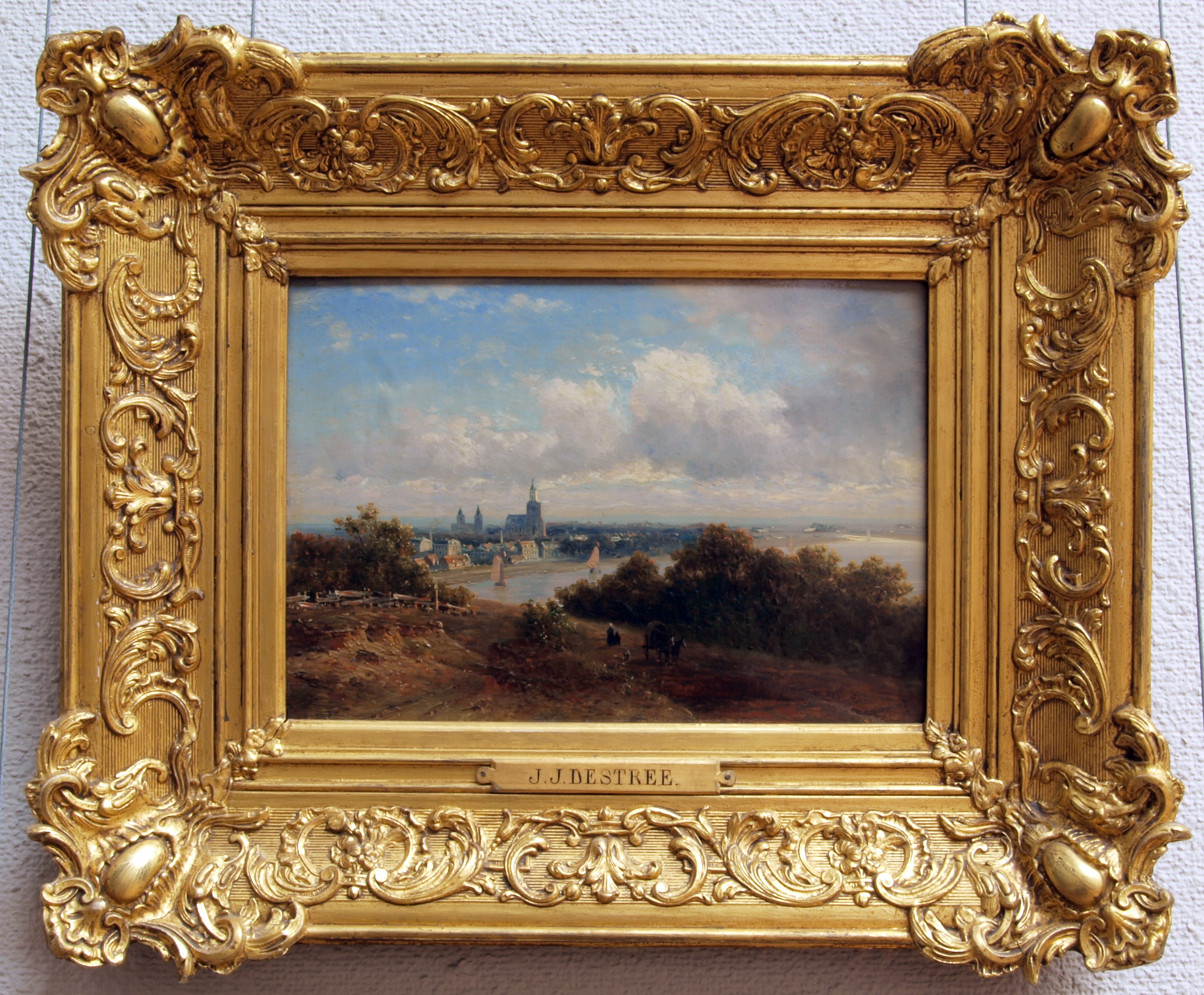
A view of Arnhem, 1852, by Johannes Joseph Destrée

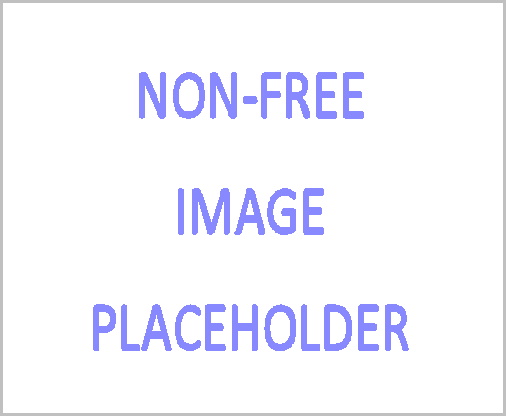
Portrait of Annie Rädecker, 1919, by John Rädecker

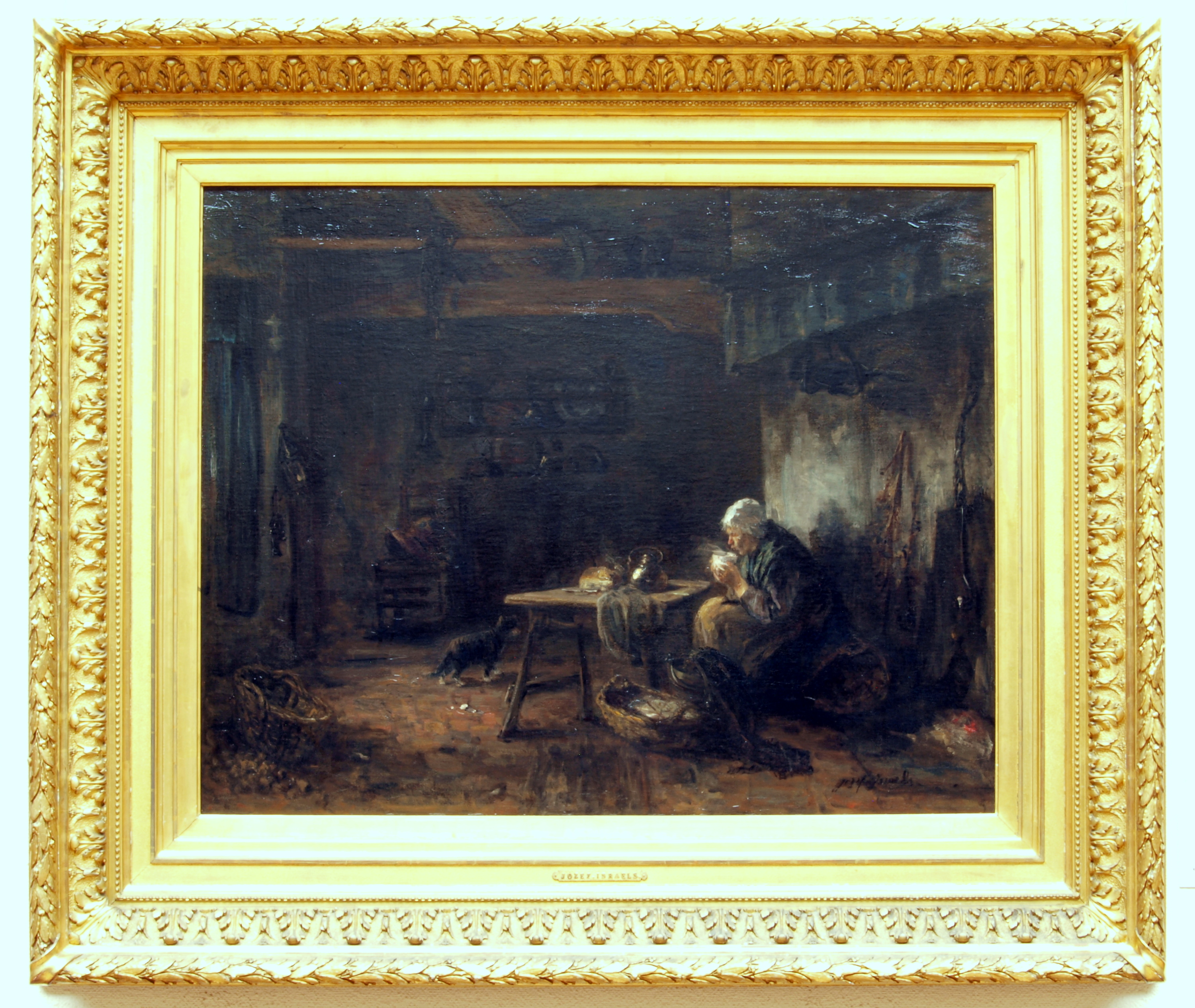
Hot drink, 1887, by Jozef Israëls

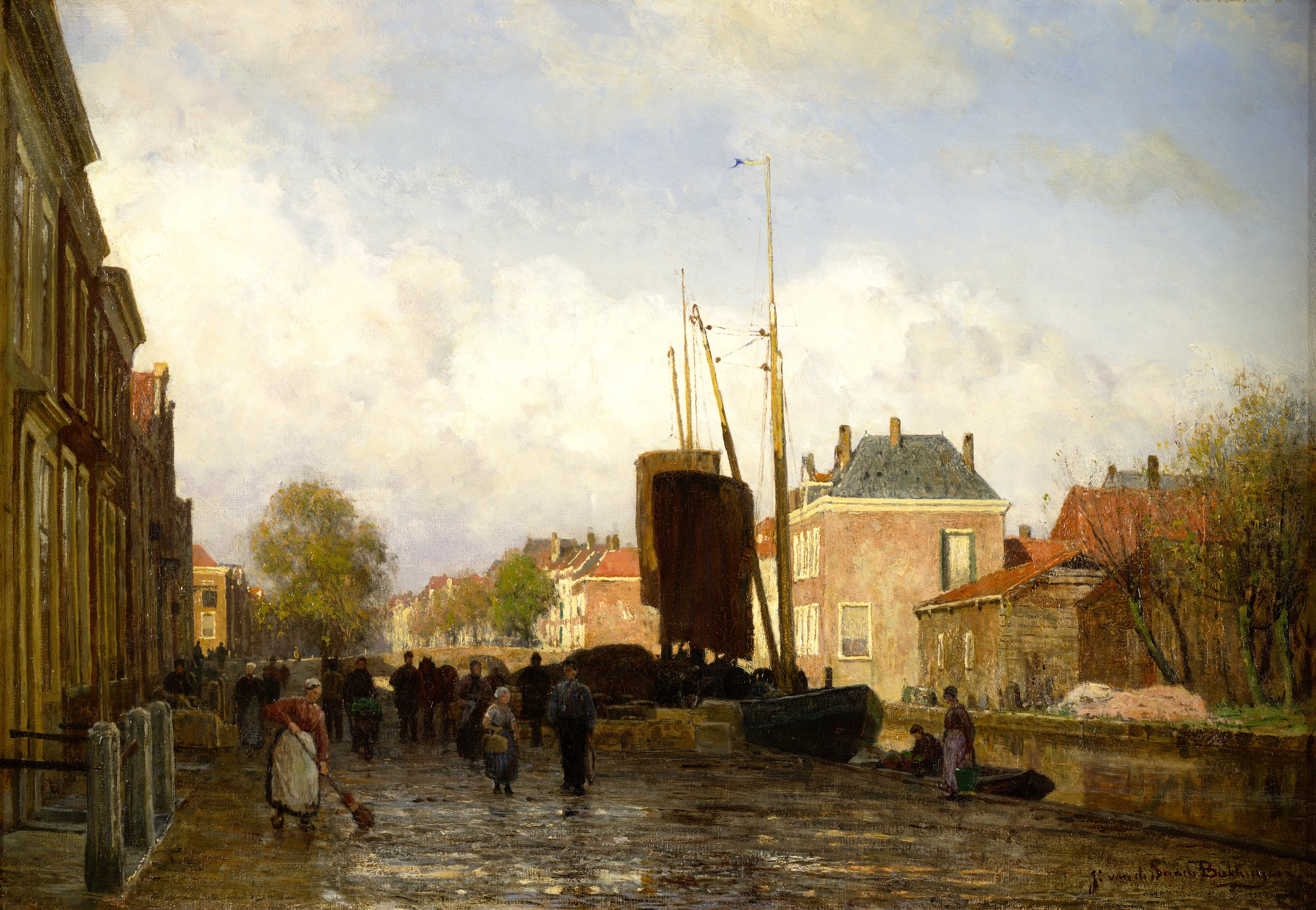
Het Zieken in the Hague, 1870, by Julius van de Sande Bakhuyzen

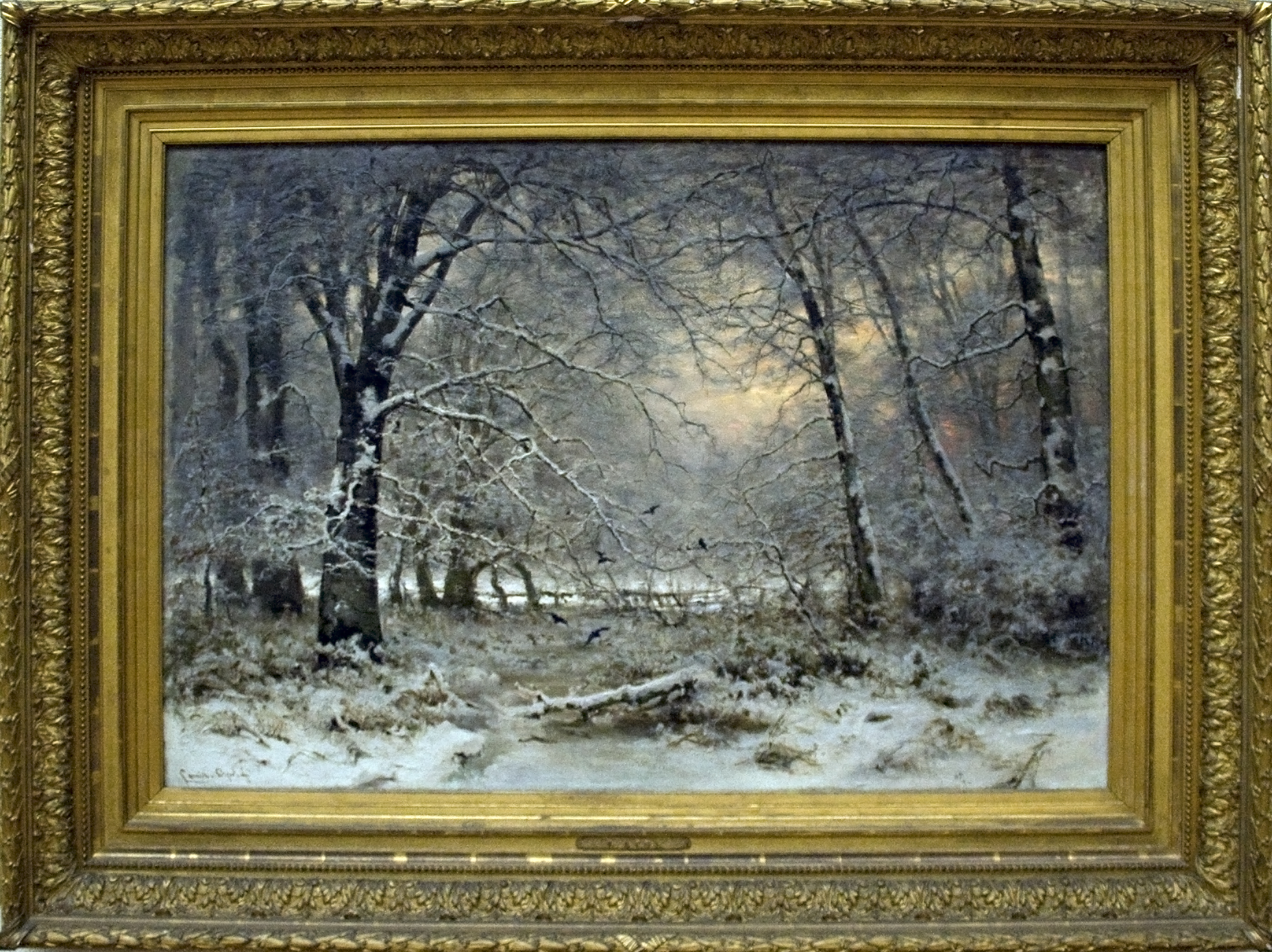
Forest in Winter, 1875, by Louis Apol

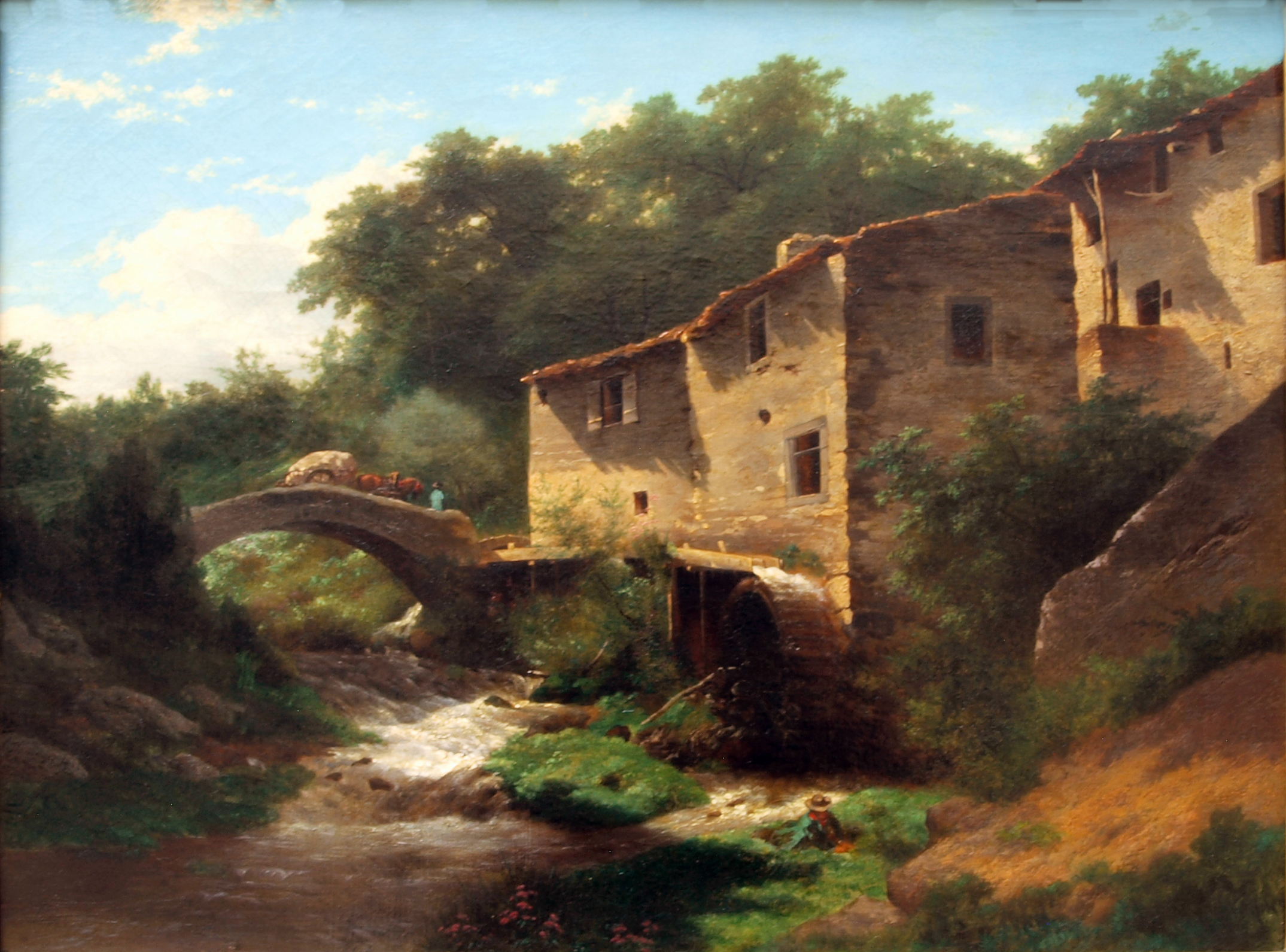
Landscape with water mill and stone bridge, 1854, by Louwrens Hanedoes

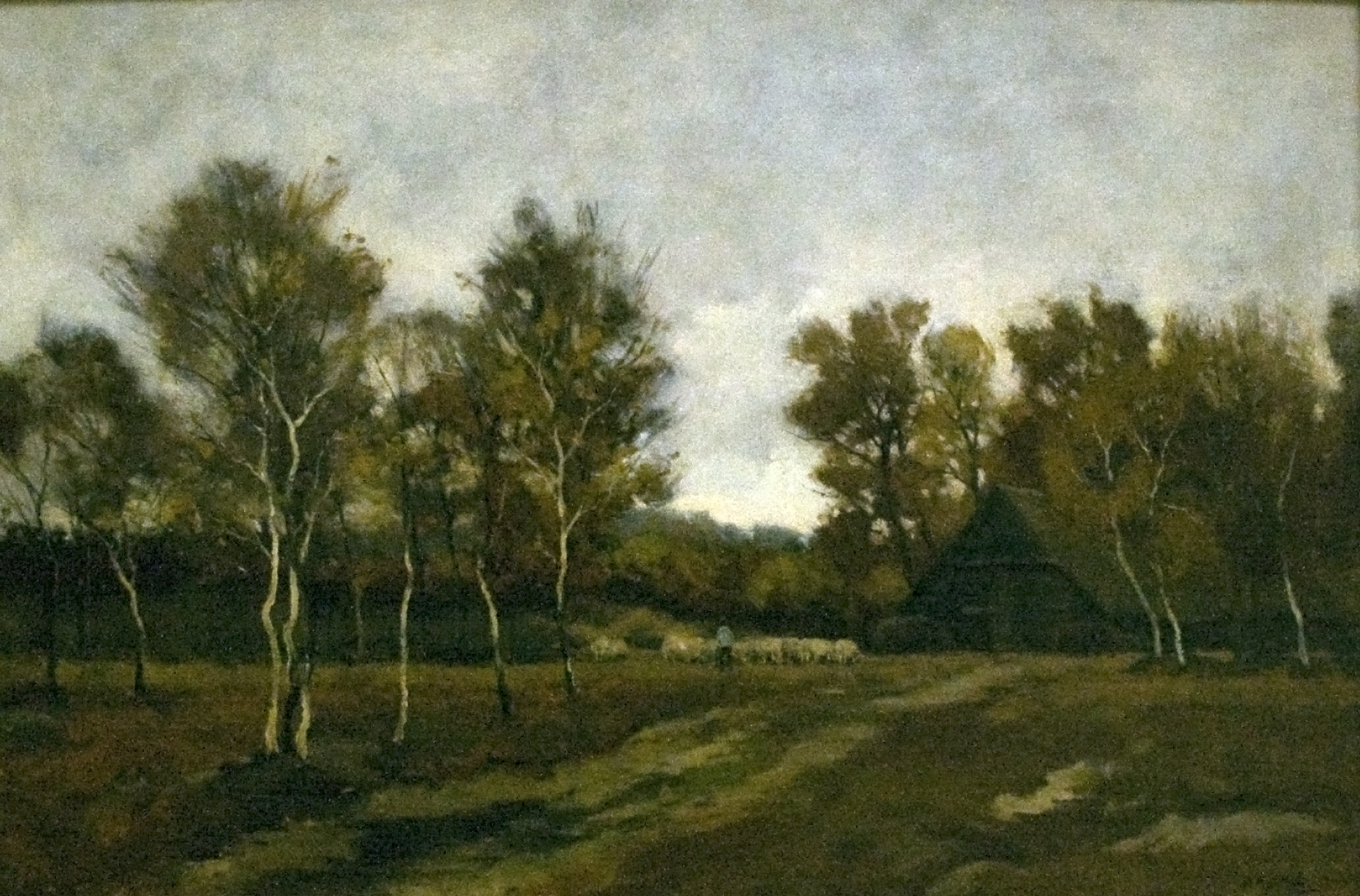
Sheepfold, 1893, by Nicolaas Bastert

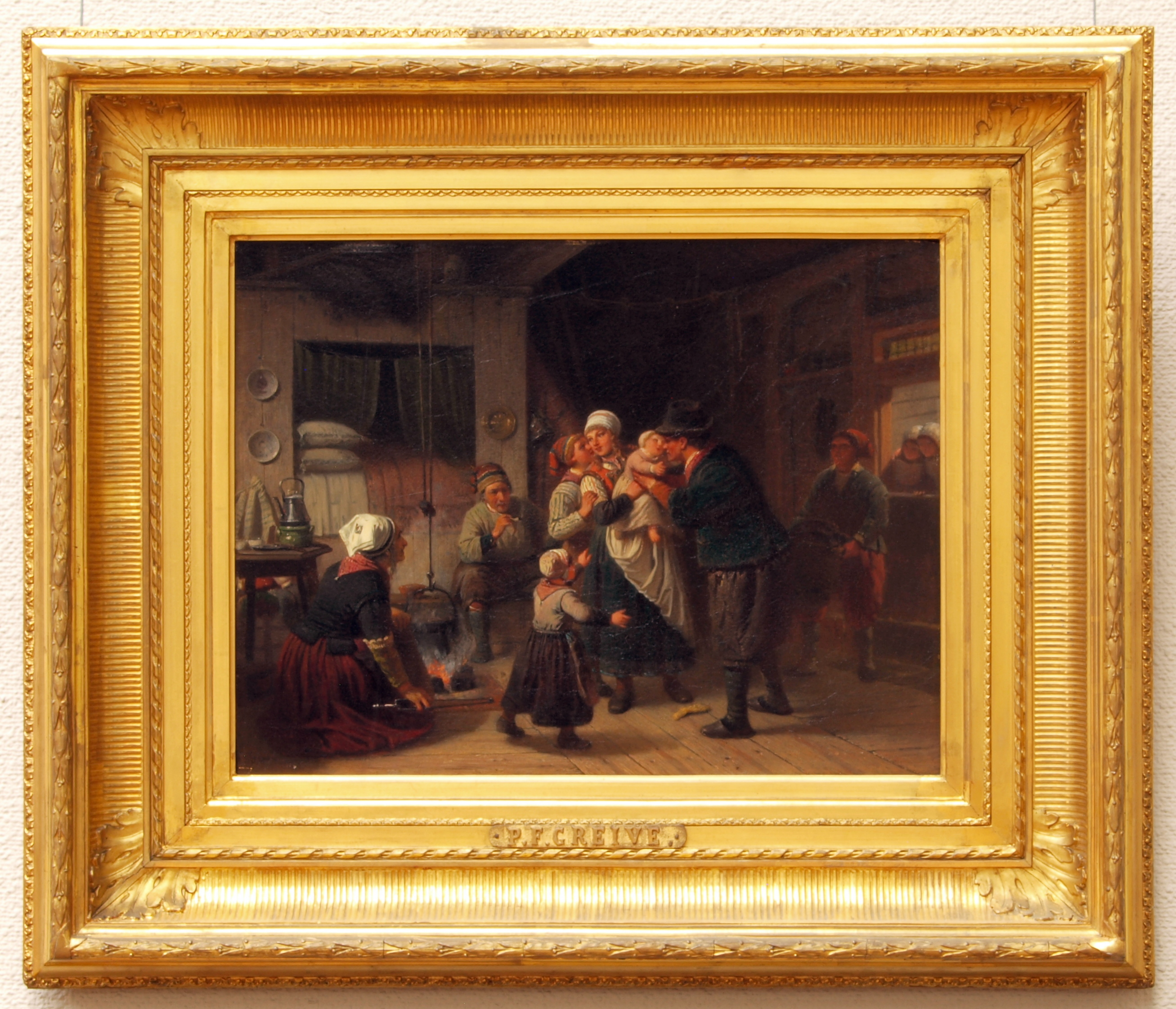
Return of the herring fishermen, 1860, by Petrus Franciscus Greive

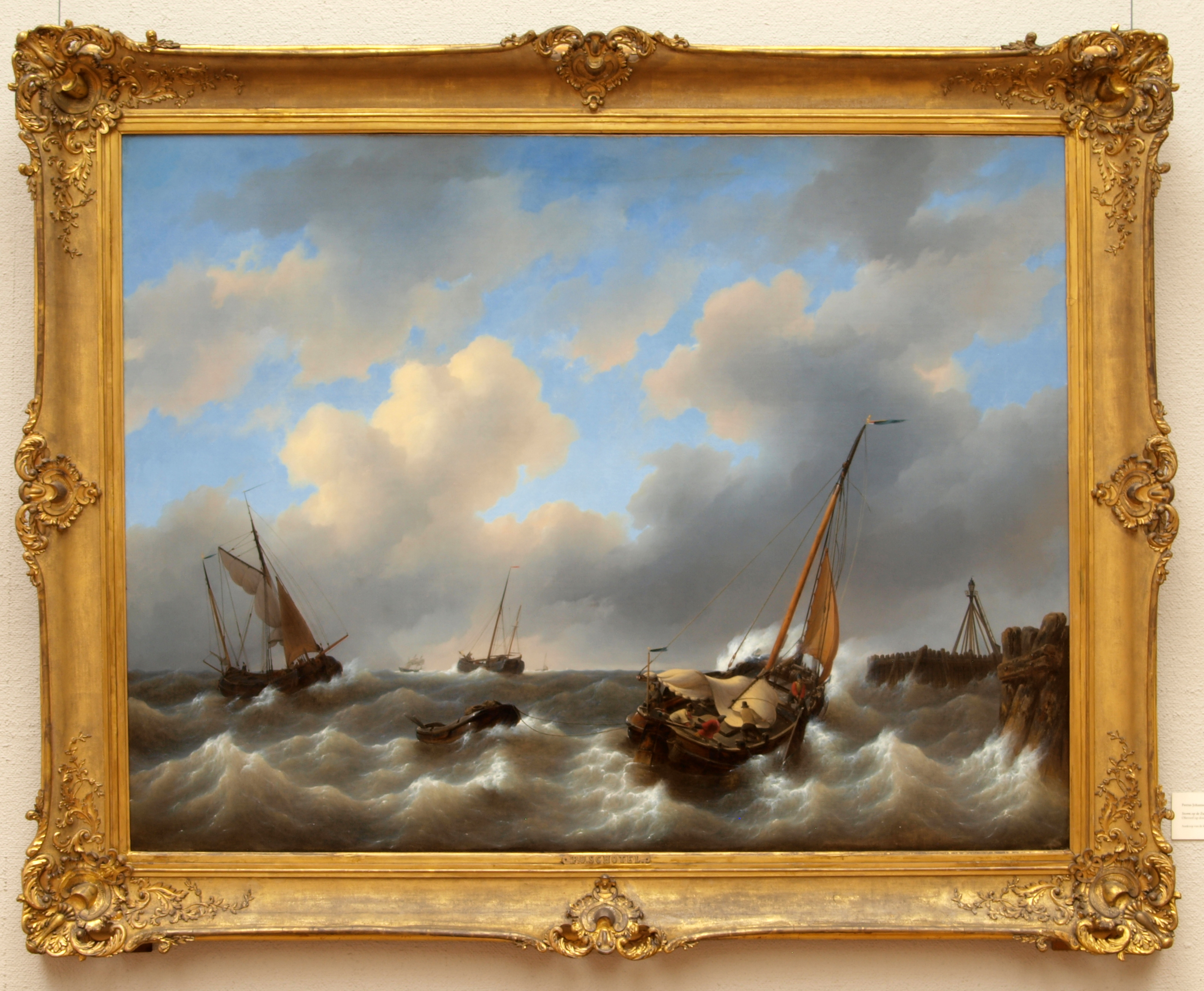
Storm on the Zuiderzee, 1840, by Petrus Johannes Schotel

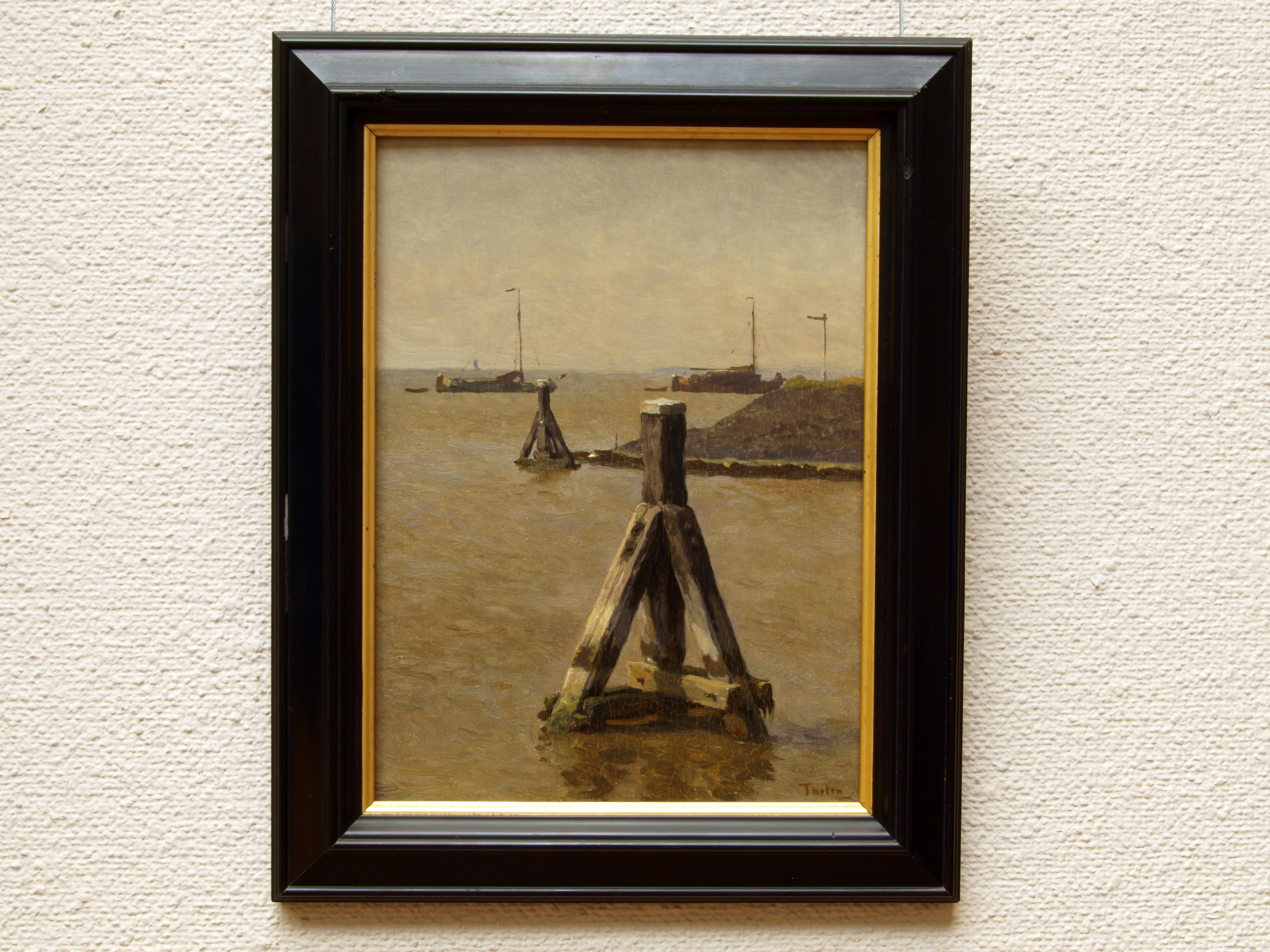
Bollard (Dukdalf), 1880, by Willem Bastiaan Tholen

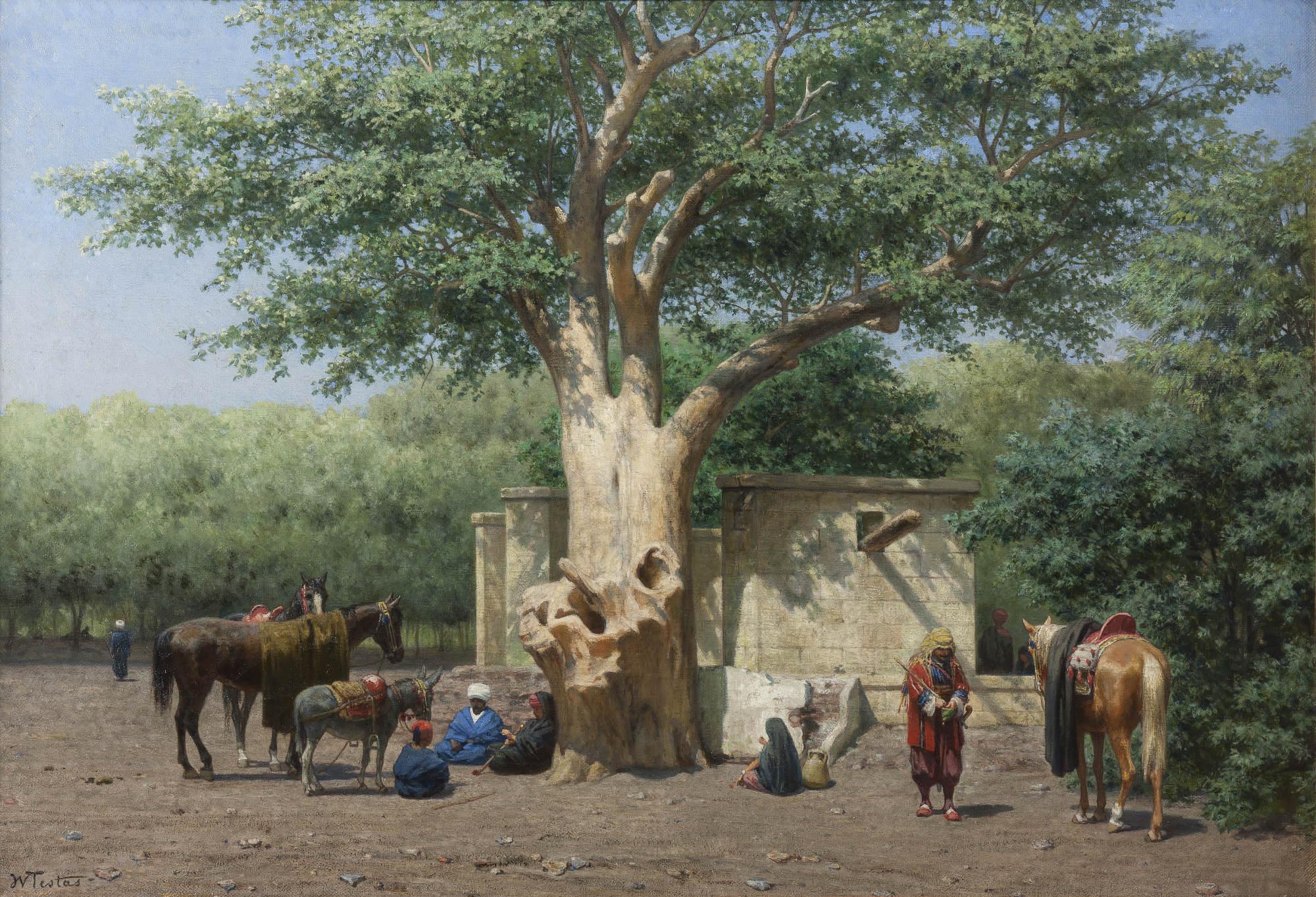
The well and sycamore in Ezbekieh Square, Cairo, c1858-60, by Willem de Famars Testas

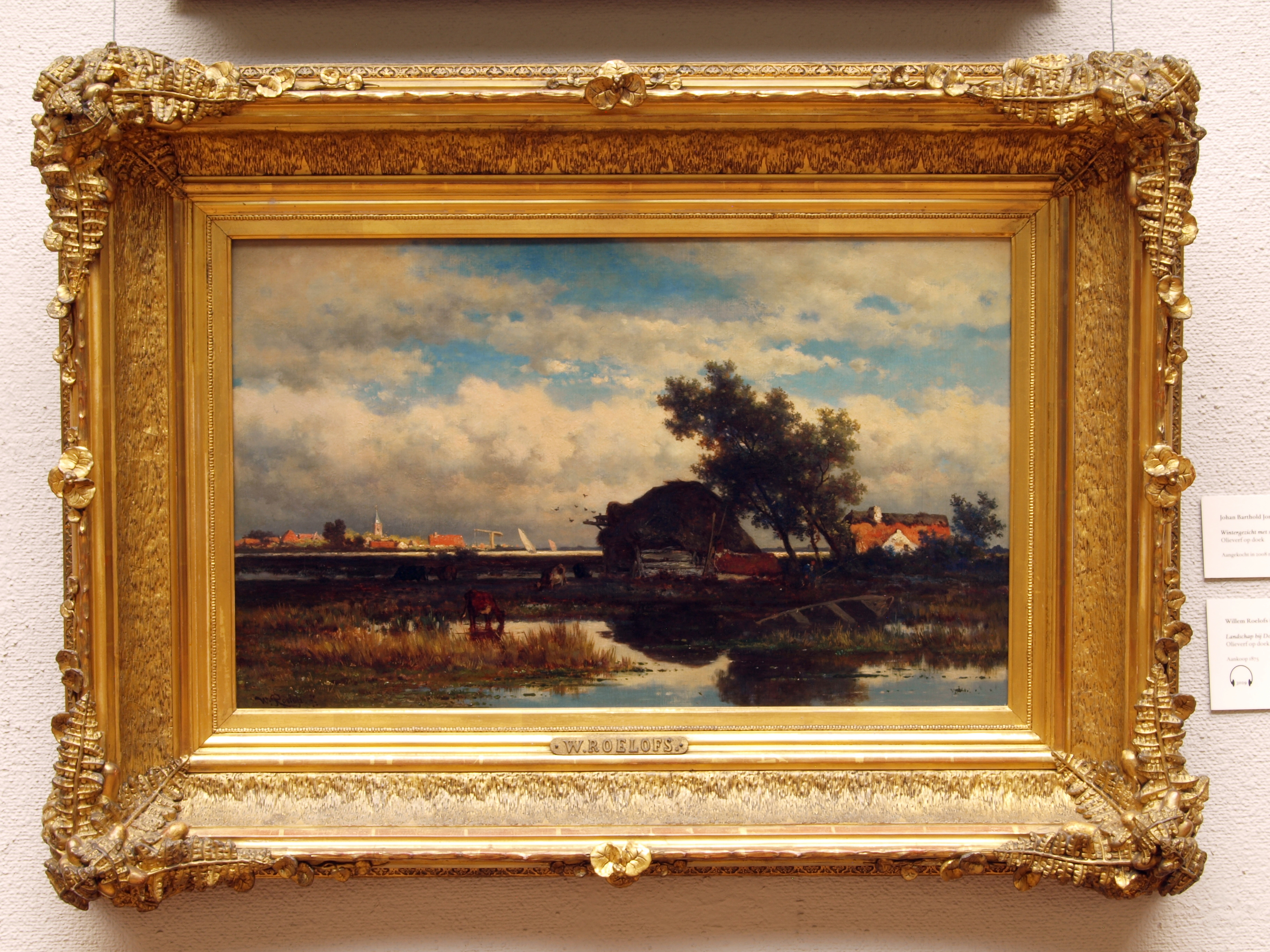
Landscape at Dordrecht, 1875, by Willem Roelofs

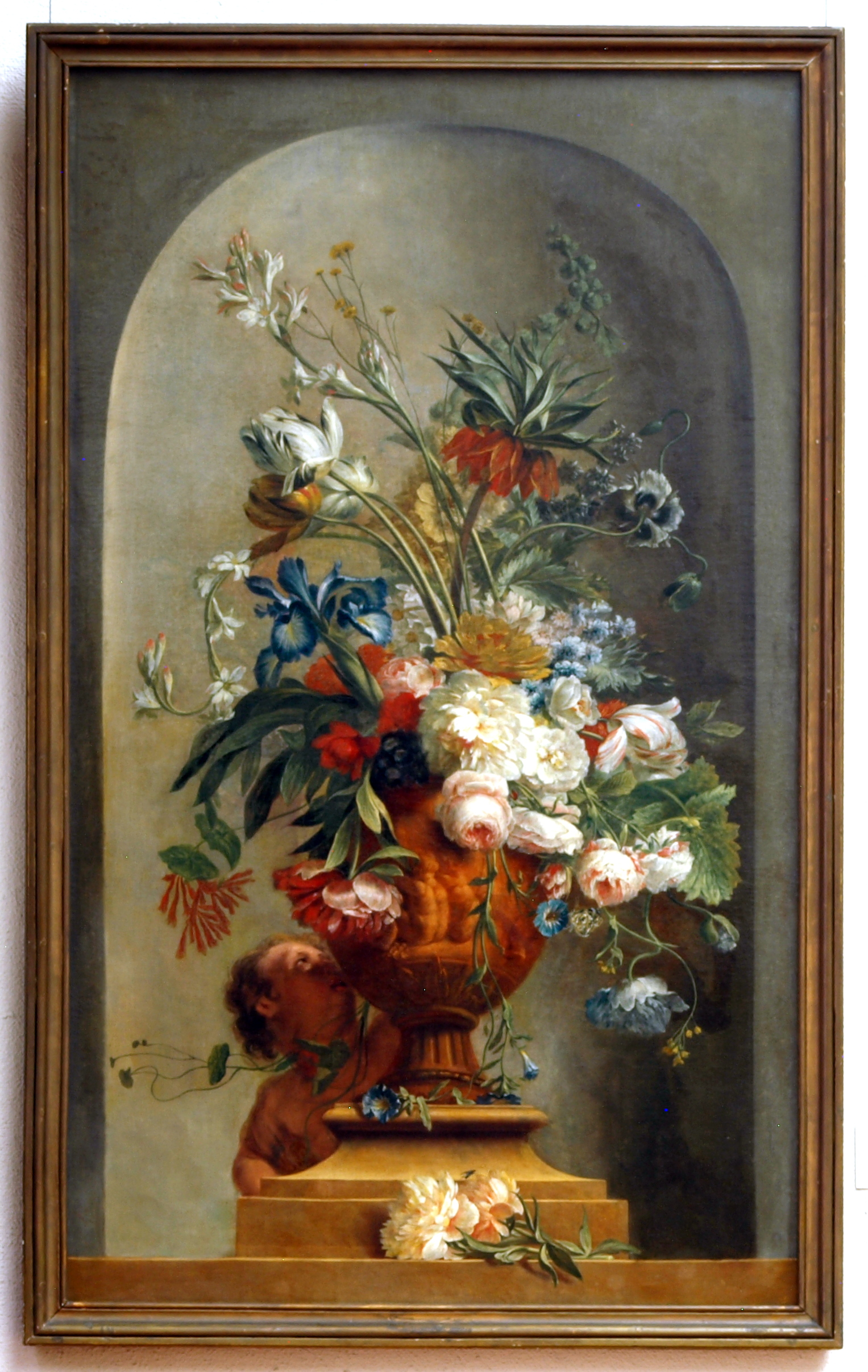
Flower still life in an urn in a niche with a cherub, c 1800–1820, by Wybrand Hendricks
