= Dekkersduin =

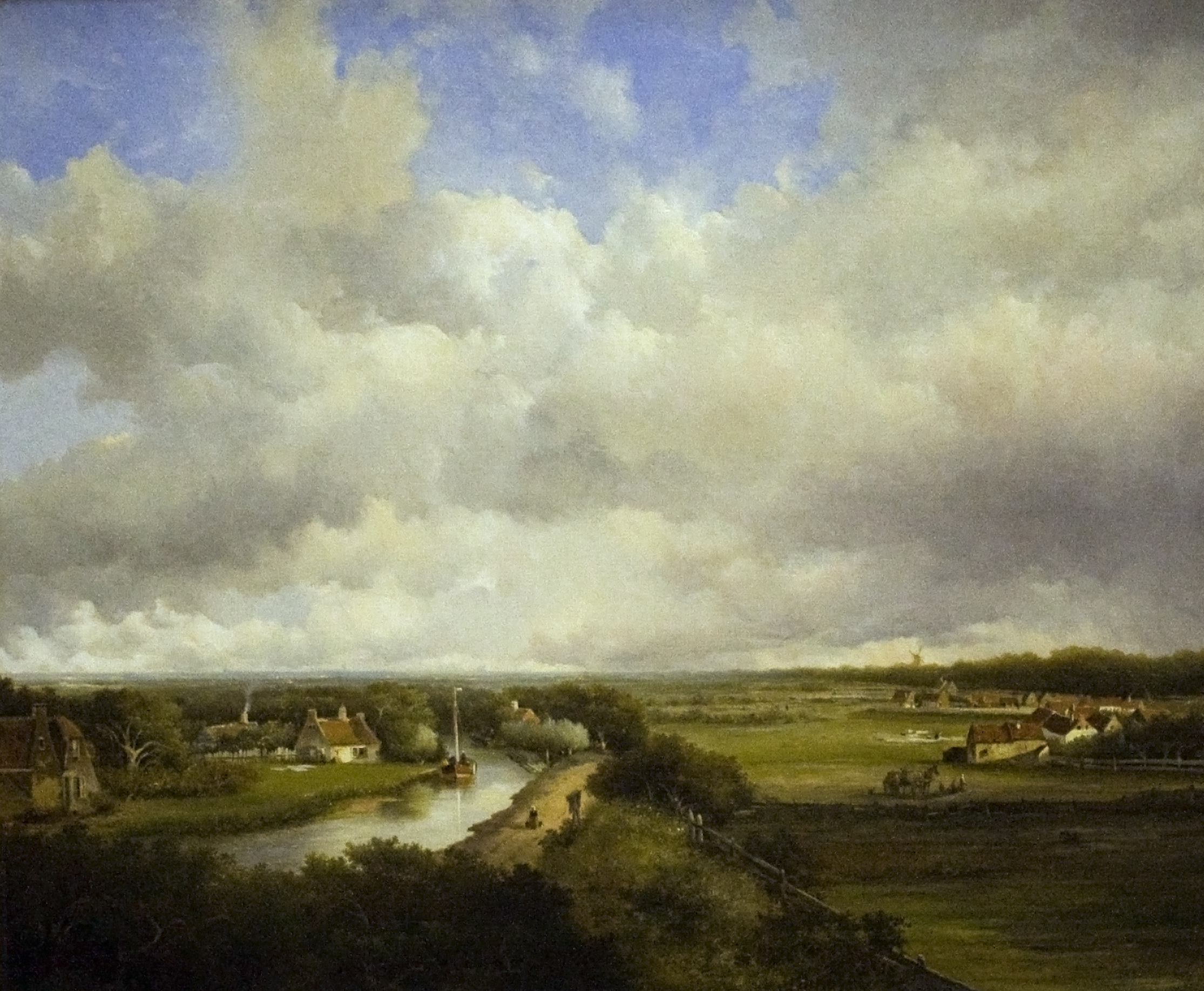
View from Dekkersduin as painted by Weissenbruch

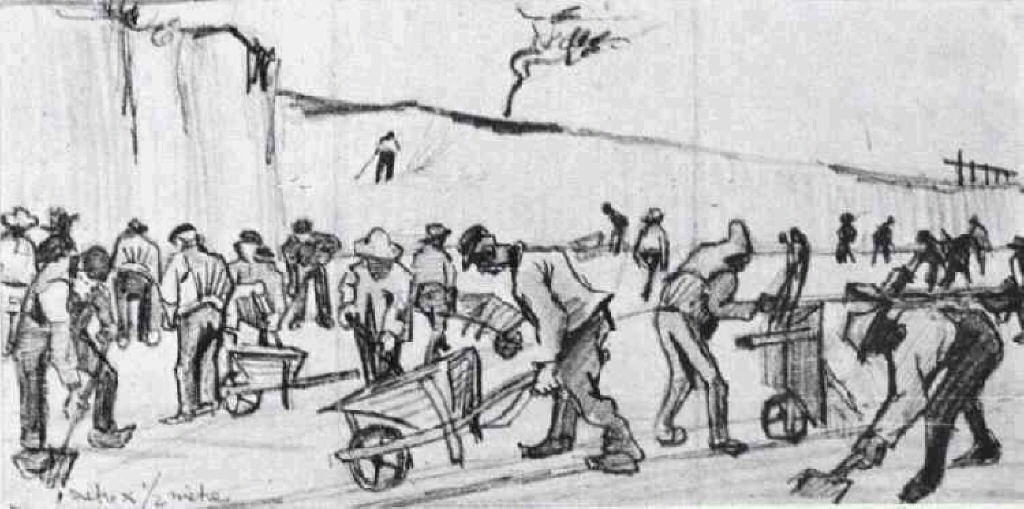
Workmen removing the sand c.1882; drawing by Vincent van Gogh

Dekkersduin (or Oostblok) is a former dune in The Hague, Netherlands. The dune existed in the 19th century at the current location of the district Duinoord, west of the current Peace Palace and was located roughly 2 kilometers from the sea. The dune was popular amongst landscape painters, such as Jacob Maris and Jan Hendrik Weissenbruch, because it offered a good outlook to the area to produce perspectives. A painting with the same name, Dekkersduin, by Weissenbruch shows the panorama from this dune.

The dune disappeared over time because the sand was removed for use in construction.

== Sources ==
- http://www.mesdagvancalcar.nl/Leesstukken/SchildersDekkersduin.htm
