= Dekkersduin (painting) =

1849 painting by Johan Hendrik Weissenbruch

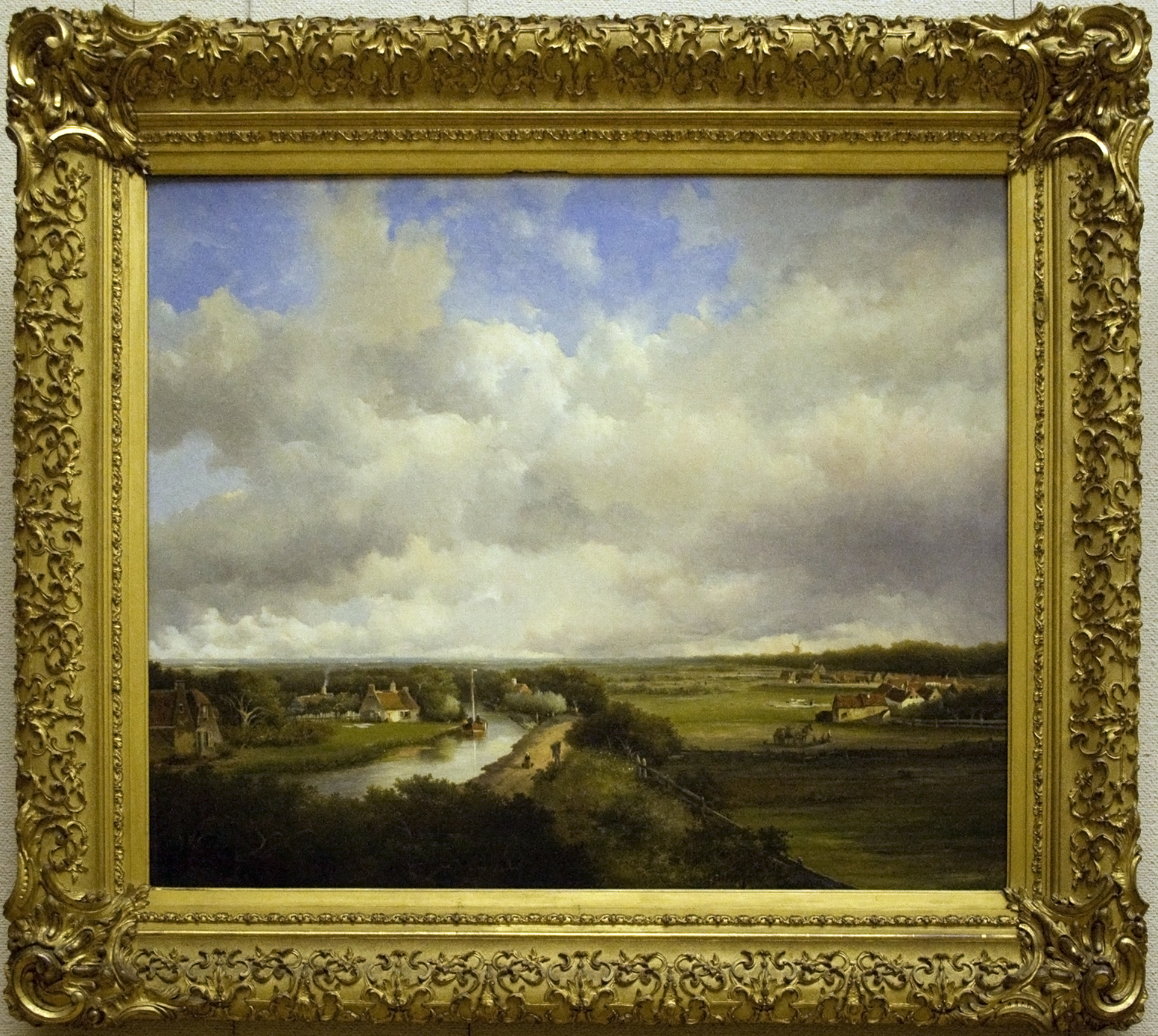
The painting Dekkersduin

Dekkersduin is a painting by the Dutch landscape painter Jan Hendrik Weissenbruch that he made in 1849. The painting offers a panorama view from the old hill in The Hague called Dekkersduin, for which it is named. The painting offers a now-historical view westwards towards Scheveningen along what would become the "Afvoerkanaal", a canal to refresh the water in the city canals with water from the dunes. The dune Dekkersduin was a favored place used by Weissenbruch and other painters of the Hague School because they liked the light effects on the plains. Today the entire area displayed in the painting has been built up and the hill itself has been leveled to make room for homes, offices, and parks and only the turn in the canal offers a clue to the original position of the painter.

The painting was purchased from the artist by the Teylers Museum in Haarlem, where it hangs in the permanent collection.
