= Jan Hendrik Weissenbruch =

Dutch painter (1824–1903)

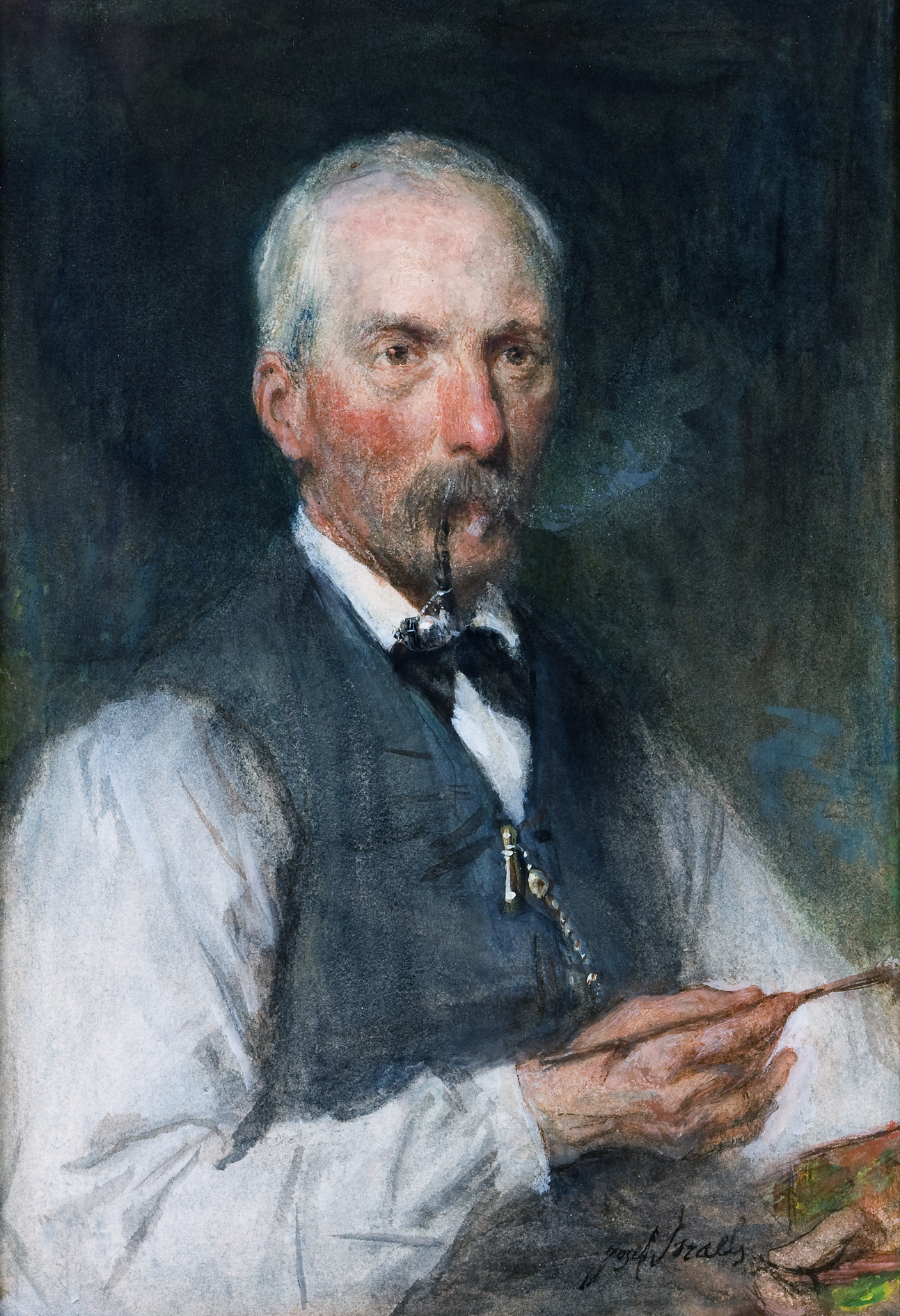
Jan Hendrik Weissenbruch, by Jozef Israëls (1882)

Jan Hendrik Weissenbruch, also known as Hendrik Johannes Weissenbruch (born 19 June 1824 in The Hague – died 24 March 1903 in The Hague) was a Dutch painter of the Hague School. He is noted especially for his watercolours.

== Biography ==
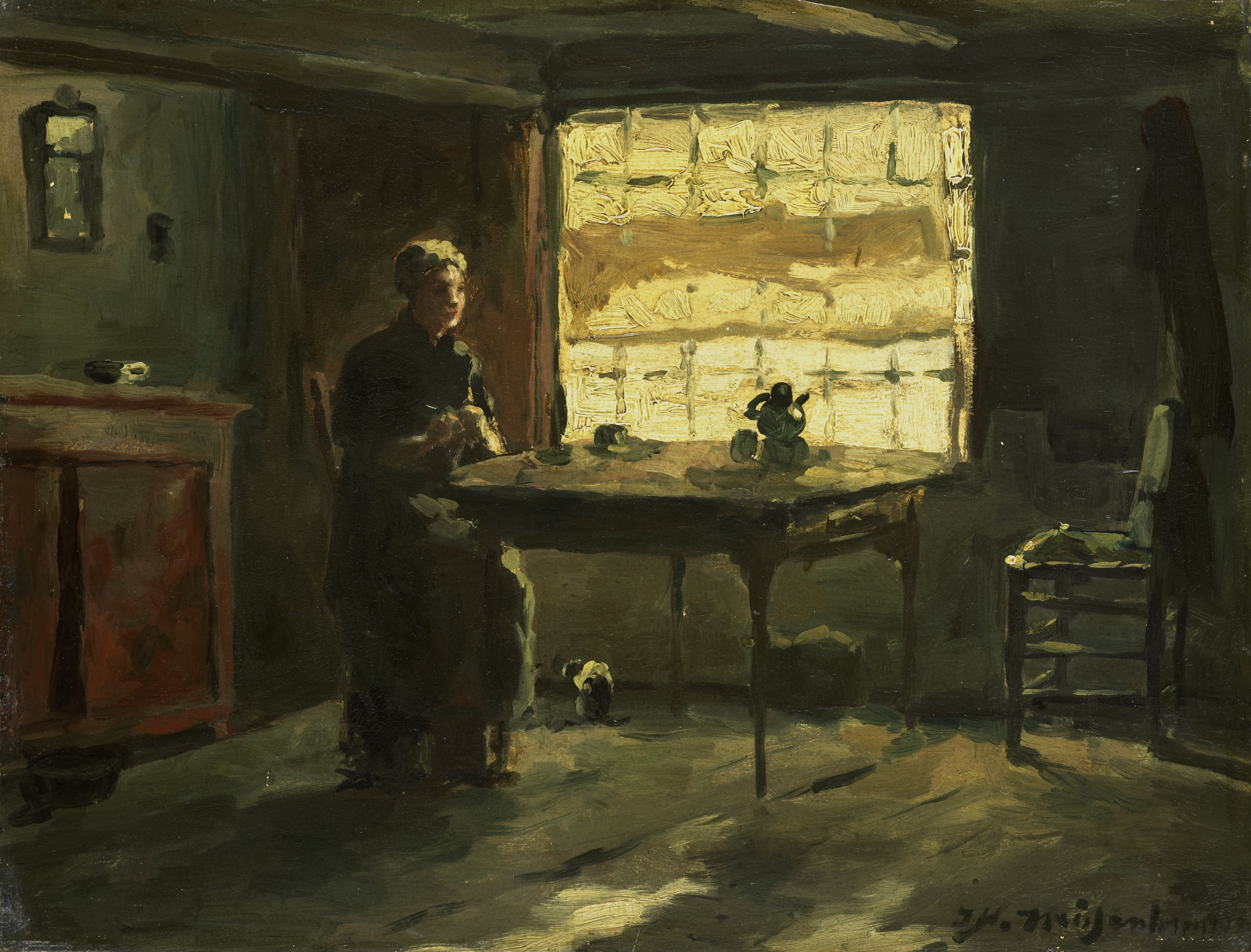
Farmhouse interior, oil on panel, between 1870 and 1903. Rijksmuseum, Amsterdam.

Hendrik Johannes Weissenbruch, also known as Jan Hendrik, was born in The Hague on 19 June 1824, the second son of Johannes Weissenbruch and Johanna Hendrika Zaag. He came from an artistic family. His father Johannes, a chef and restaurateur, painted in his free time and collected art on a small scale. Among Johannes' collection were works by Andreas Schelfhout and Bartholomeus van Hove. Johannes' cousin Jan (1822–80) was a well-known painter of townscapes. Another cousin Frederik Hendrik (1828–87) was a lithographer, while his younger brother Frederik Johan, his uncle Daniel and his nephew Isaac (1826–1912) were all engravers.

When Jan was sixteen years old he received drawing lessons from Johannes Low. In 1843, he took evening classes taught by Bartholomeus van Hove at the Hague Academy of Art. During the day Weissenbruch worked in Van Hove's studio, together with Johannes Bosboom and Salomon Verveer, helping to make pieces of scenery for the Royal Theatre.

Weissenbruch's early work showed the strong influence of the romantic painter Andreas Schelfhout. Schelfhout's influence can be seen in Weissenbruch's early landscapes, painted in precise detail. His magnificent, cloudy skies show his admiration for the seventeenth-century artist Jacob van Ruisdael, whose work he saw at an early age in the Mauritshuis in The Hague. When he was invited to take lessons from this very celebrated artist, his older friend, Bosboom, advised him not to accept. 'I can't simply say "no, thank you" to Schelfhout!" sputtered Weissenbruch. Whereupon Bosboom said: "you should do that, Weiss! You have to learn to stand on your own and see through your own eyes." In 1847, Weissenbruch first exhibited at the Exhibition of Living Masters, and he became one of the founders of the Pulchri Studio.

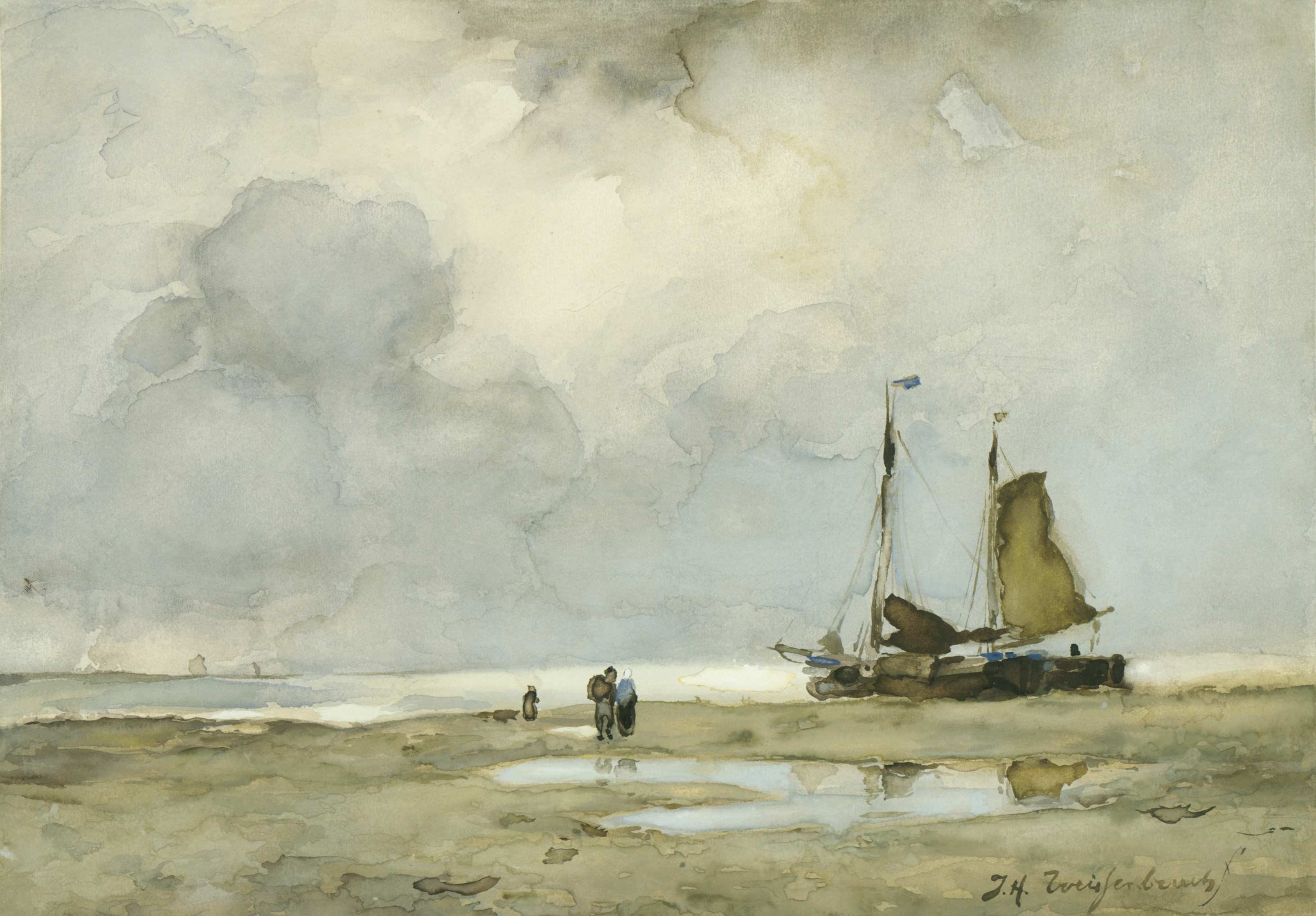
Jan Weissenbruch (1895): Strandgezicht Rijksmuseum, Amsterdam

In 1849, two years after Weissenbruch staged his first exhibition, the Teylers Museum in Haarlem acquired one of his panoramic landscapes. However, that early success did not last very long. In spite of the prestige he had earned among his colleagues, he did not achieve public acknowledgement until the late 1880s. During this intermediate period, Weissenbruch went from being a characteristic painter of Dutch Romanticism to one of the best representatives of the Hague School. His lively dune landscapes led to a series of atmospheric impressions of the Dutch polders, in which the artist paid special attention to his representation of the cloudy skies with its light and shadows and the dynamics of the permanent winds. The contrast from the sky to the water is very important to him, too. Thus he belonged to the Kortenhoef School, one of the followers of the Oosterbeek School. These beautiful oil and watercolour landscapes were painted, almost without exception, with free and delicate brushstrokes.

The sky above the polders began to play a more important role. His use of color gradually became more restrained and his application of paint increasingly broader and looser. This made his landscapes more atmospheric, the bearers of light and clouds. He stressed the importance of both of these elements when he said, "The sky in a painting, that is what is most important! Sky and light are the great magicians. The sky determines what the painting is. Painters can never pay too much attention to the sky. We live from light and sunshine, and go with or palette through the dry periods."

Weissenbruch enjoyed working outdoors in the countryside. He usually found his subjects in the area around The Hague where he lived, rarely going far from home. Around 1875, Weissenbruch discovered the area around Noorden (Nieuwkoop), a remote polder area with lakes about 30 miles east of The Hague. He increasingly went there to paint, partly because the landscape around The Hague was becoming more and more disturbed by the rise of industrialization.

Critics argue that Weissenbruch only fully developed his talents in the last twenty years of his life. However, his fame, along with that of the Hague School, had already reached Canada, where the Art Association of Montreal appreciated the work of the Hague painters in their Loan Exhibitions from 1876 onward. In 1897, thirteen works by Weissenbruch were exhibited in Montreal. The Canadian Edward B. Greenshields published The Subjective View of Landscape Painting, with Special Reference to J.H. Weissenbruch from Works of Him in Canada in 1904, followed by Landscape Painting and Modern Dutch Artists, published in New York in 1906.

In 1900, at the age of seventy, he took a trip to Barbizon where he painted his famous forest scene. The journey to Barbizon must have been a kind of pilgrimage for him, since it was in this area that French painters, in around 1830, had first begun to paint in the open air on a large scale. These 'painters of Barbizon' strove for a natural representation of the landscape, paying particular attention to the mood and the light. Nature for Weissenbruch was also of the utmost importance.

== Paintings ==
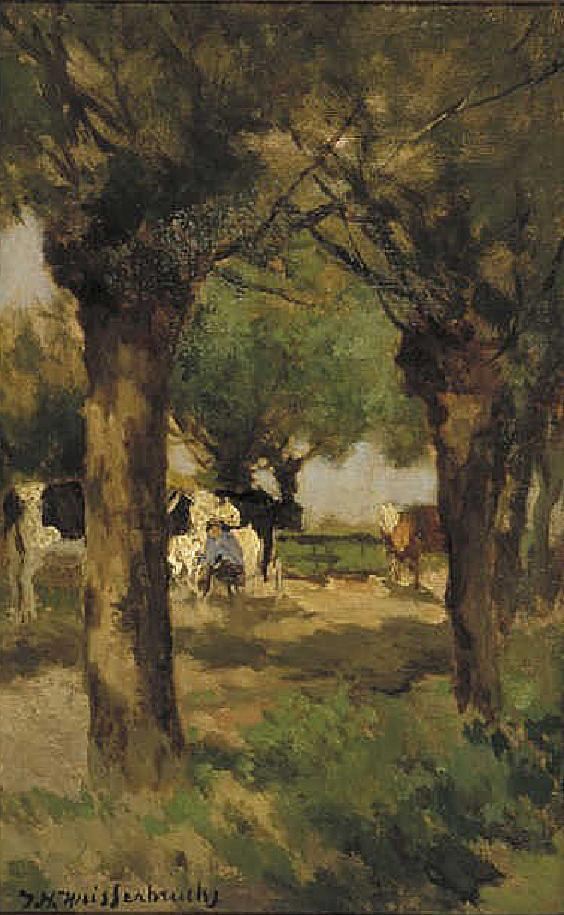
Milking Cows under the Willows, undated Museum Boijmans Van Beuningen

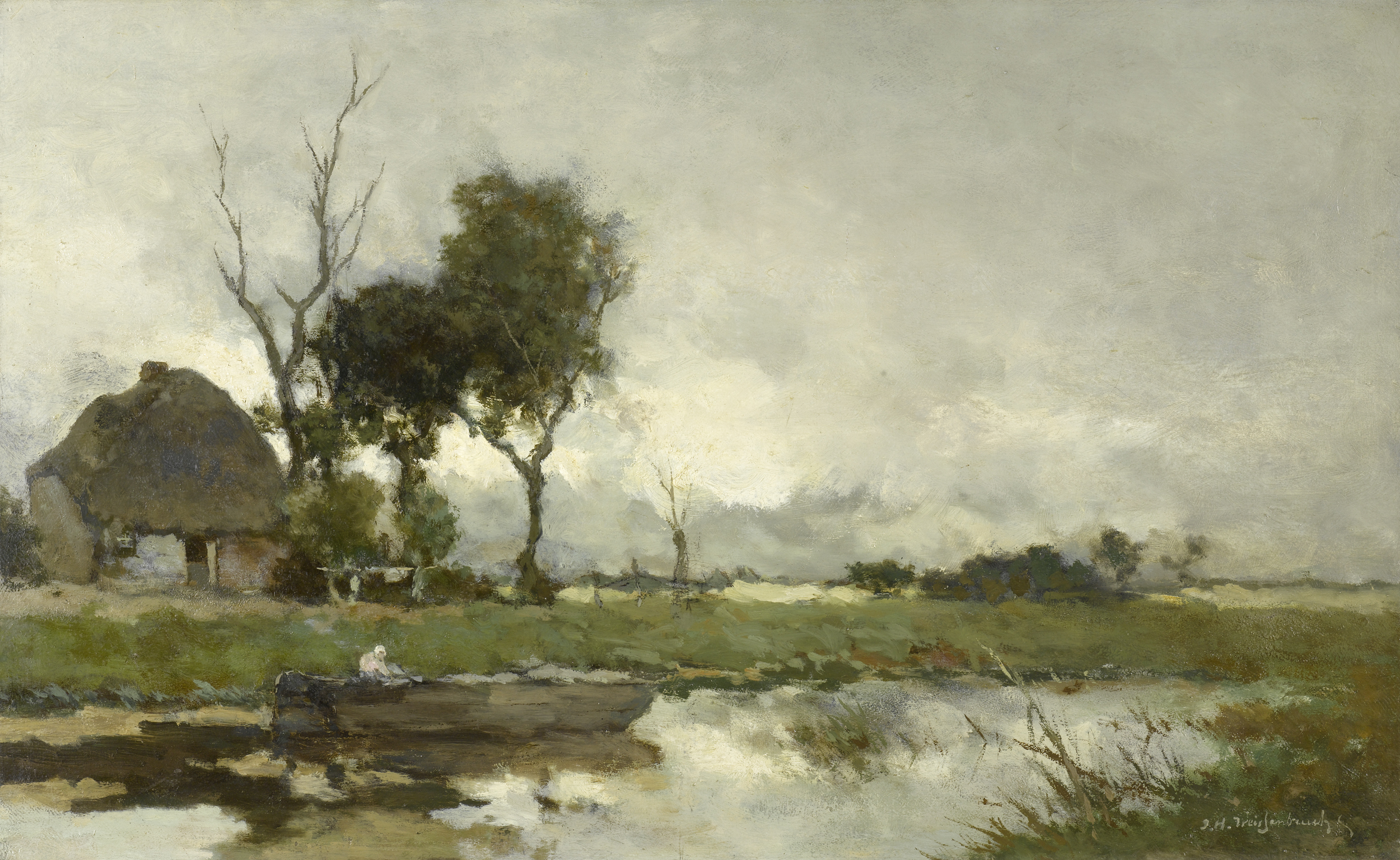
Autumn Landscape, undated Rijksmuseum Amsterdam

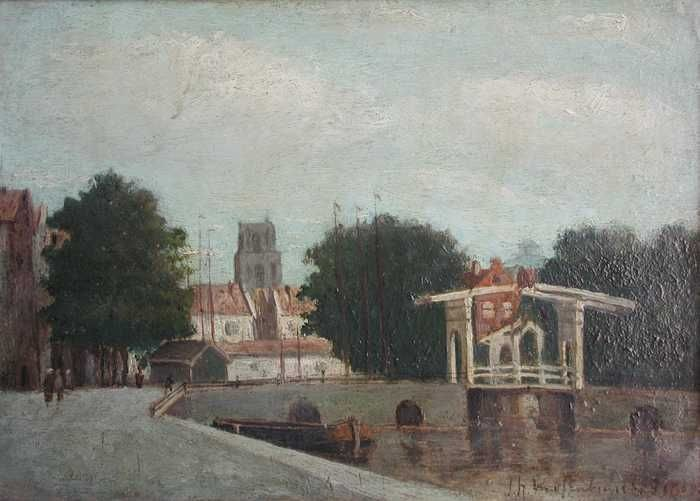
View on the Leuve harbor and bridge in Rotterdam, 1859, oil-painting on wooden panel

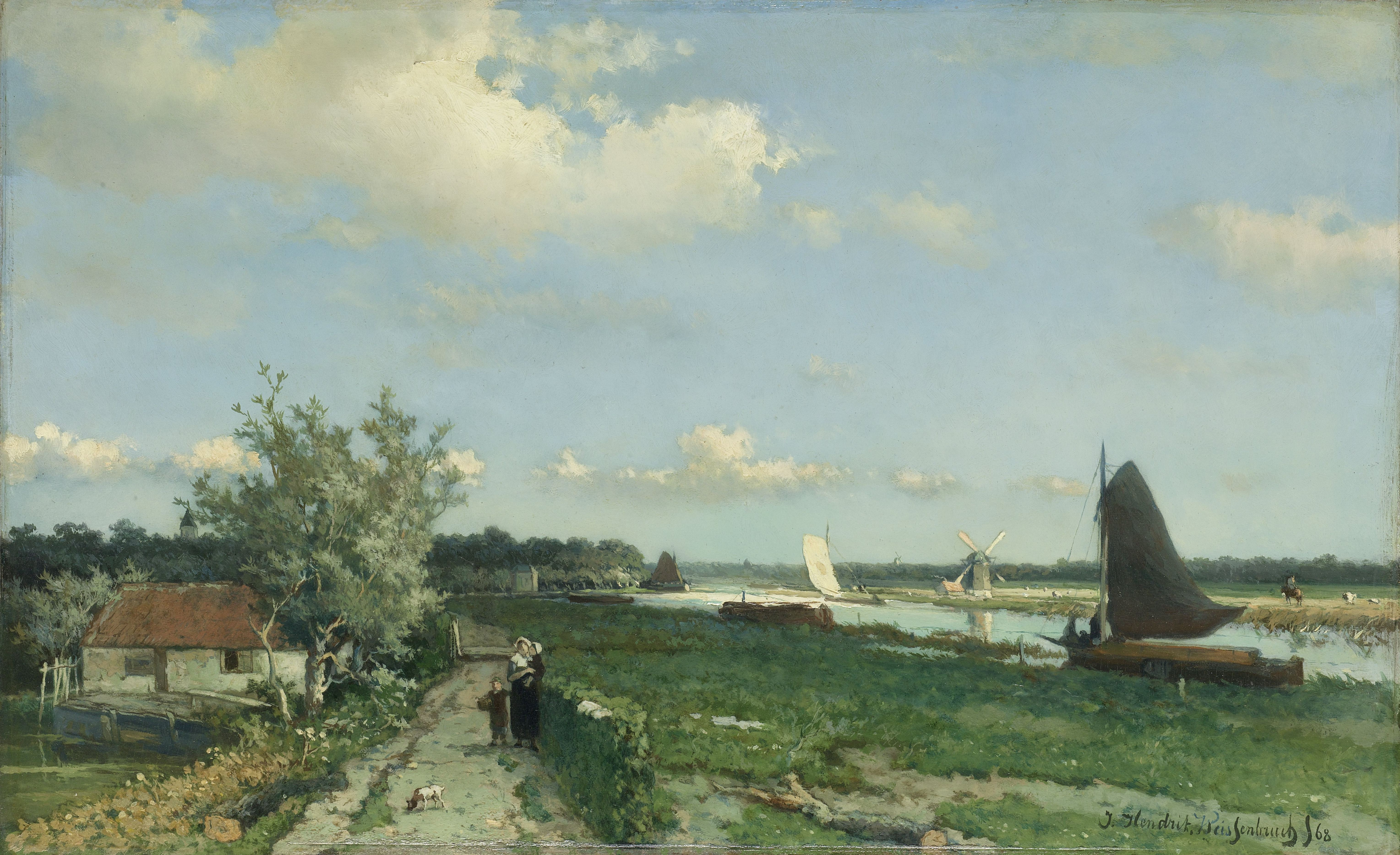
The Shipping Canal at Rijswijk, 1868, oil on panel

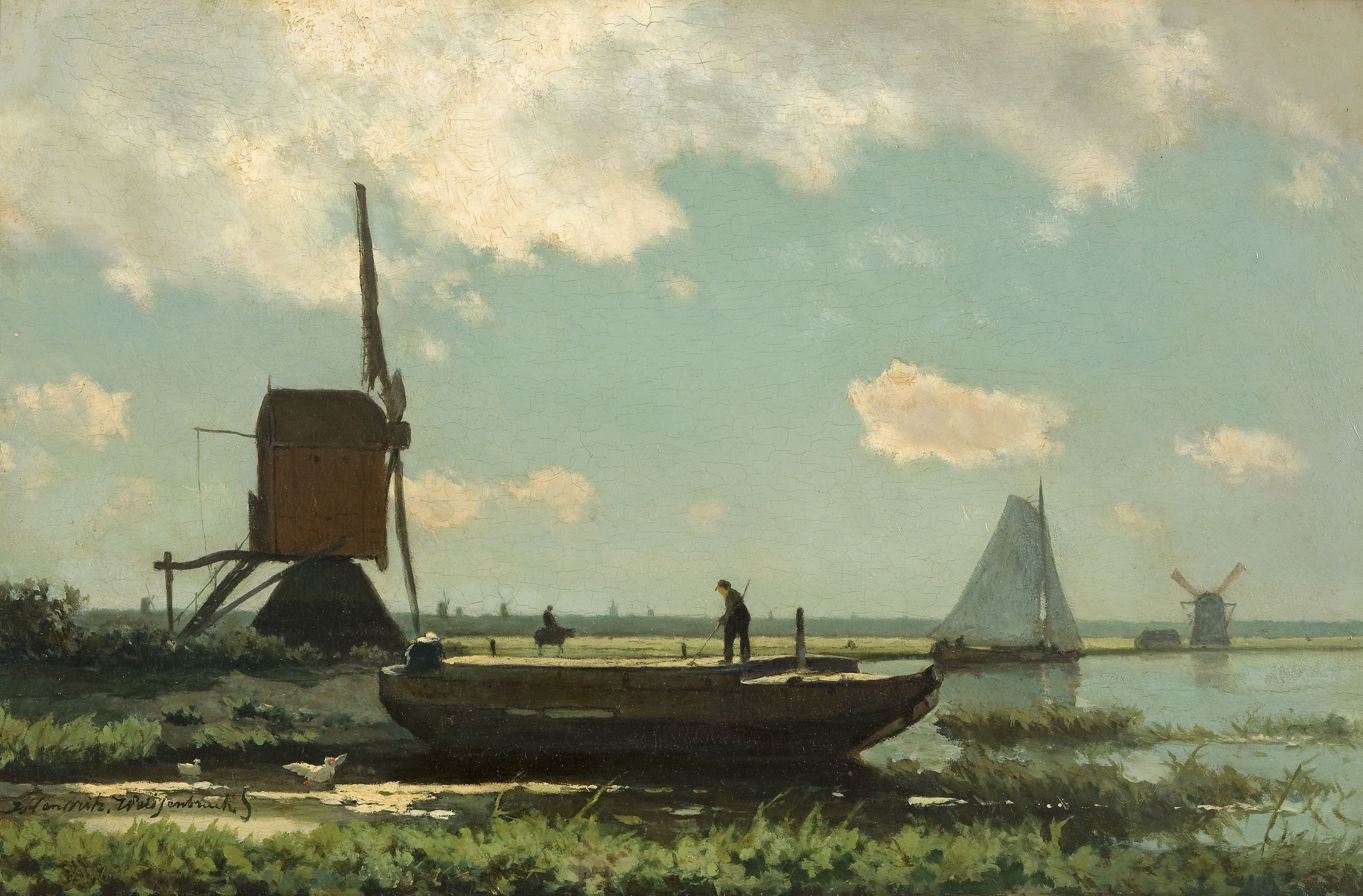
Polder Landscape with Peasant Punting a Boat, 1870, oil on panel

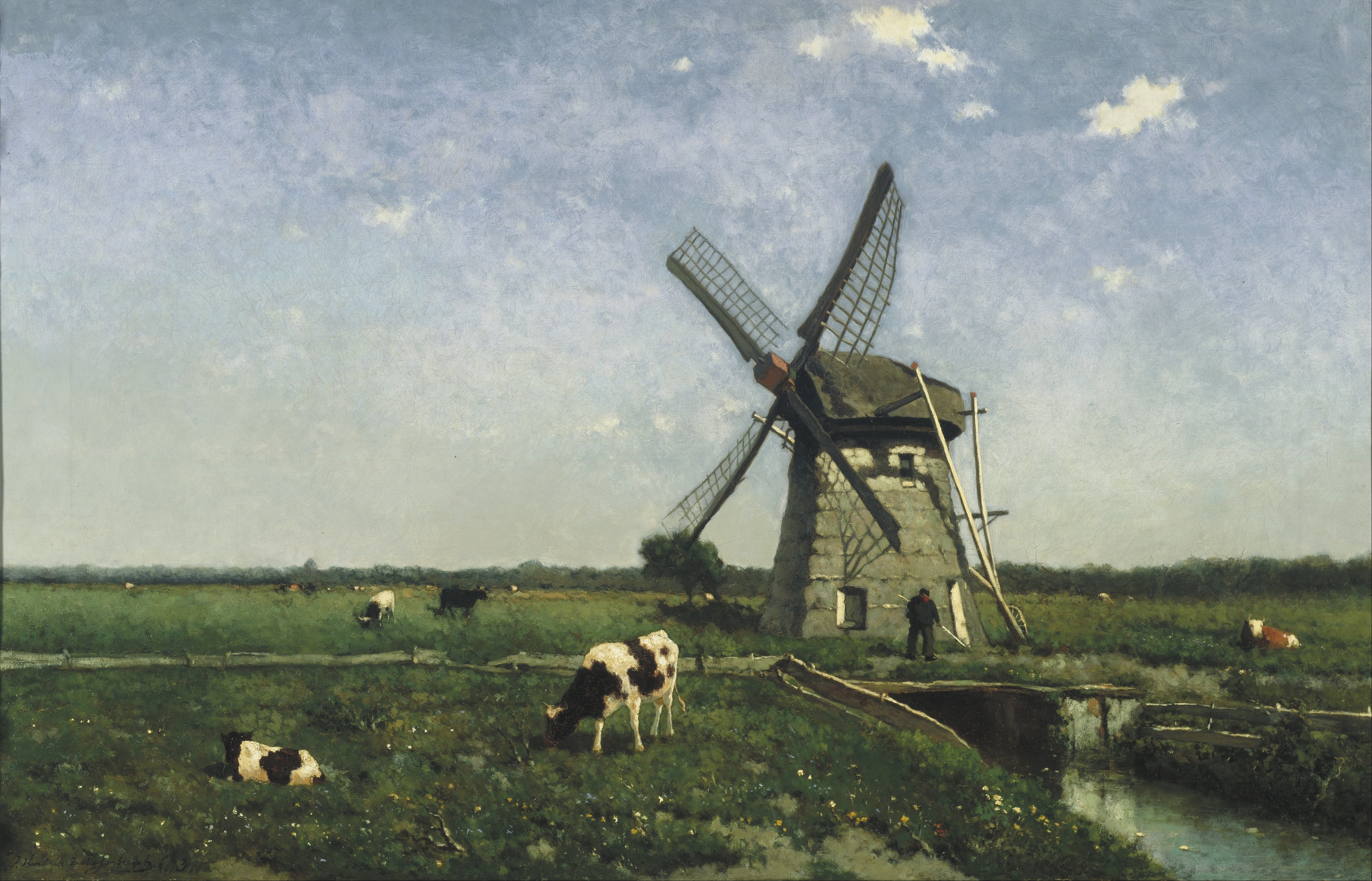
Landscape with Mill Near Schiedam, 1873, oil on canvas

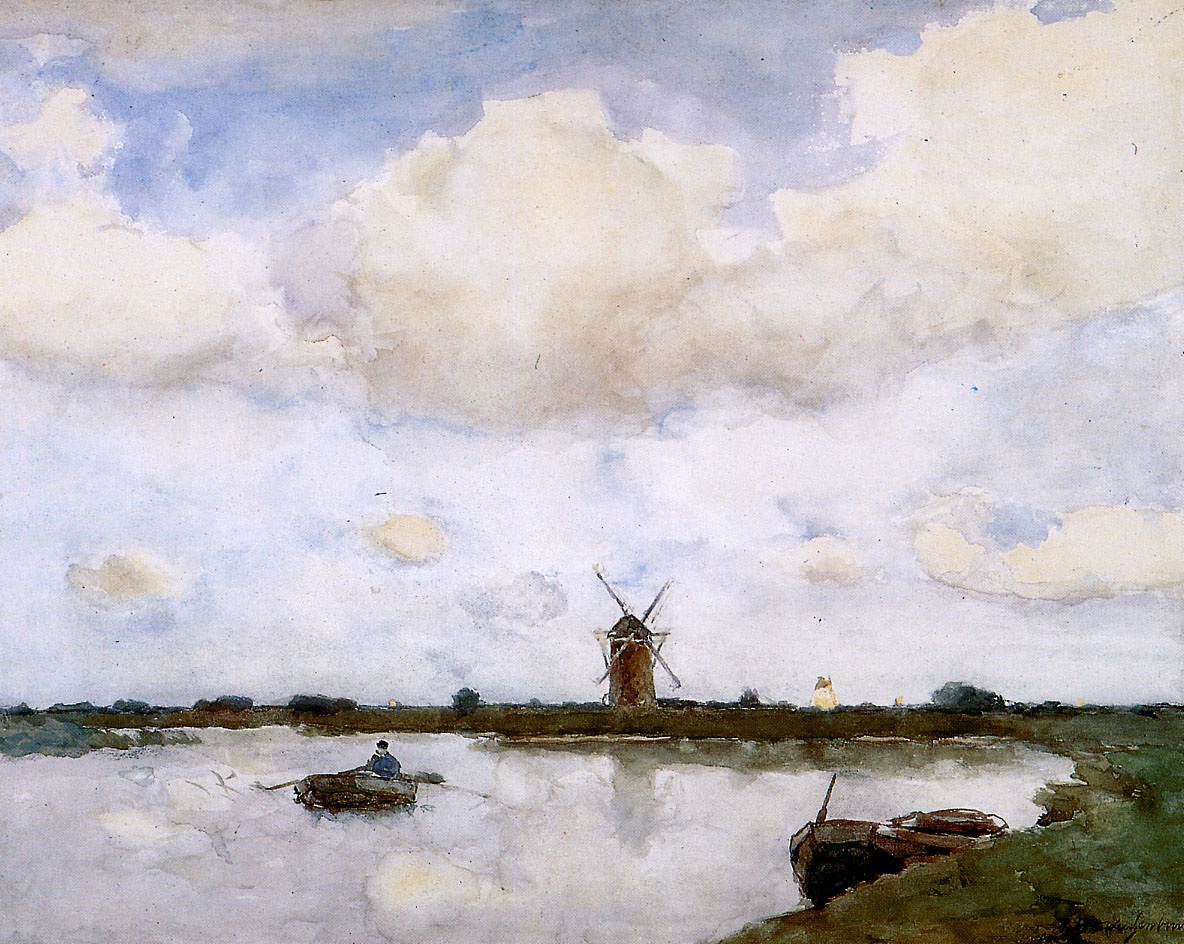
'Mill in the polder', c. 1880, watercolor on paper

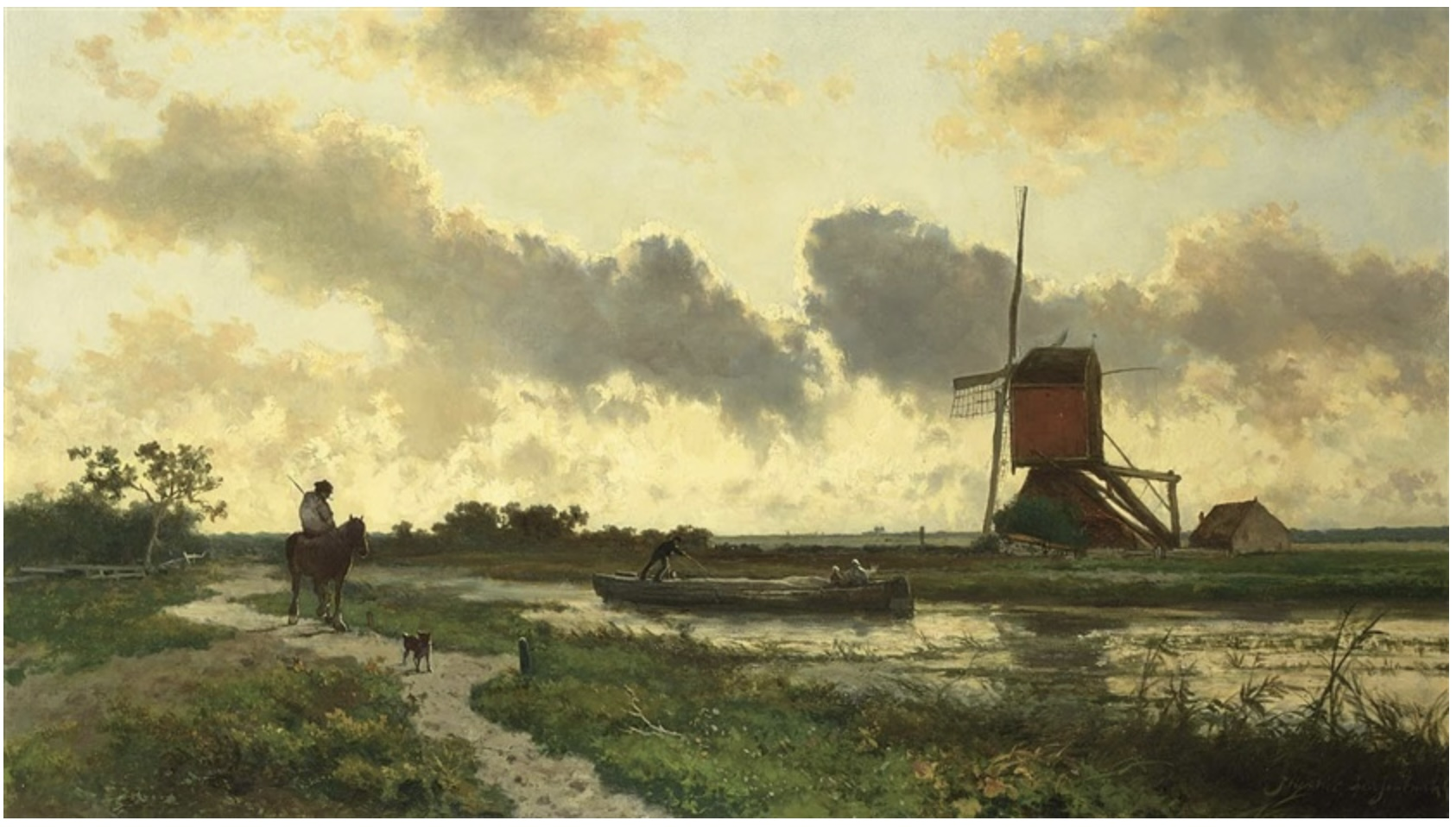
Sunset at Boskoop, 1864

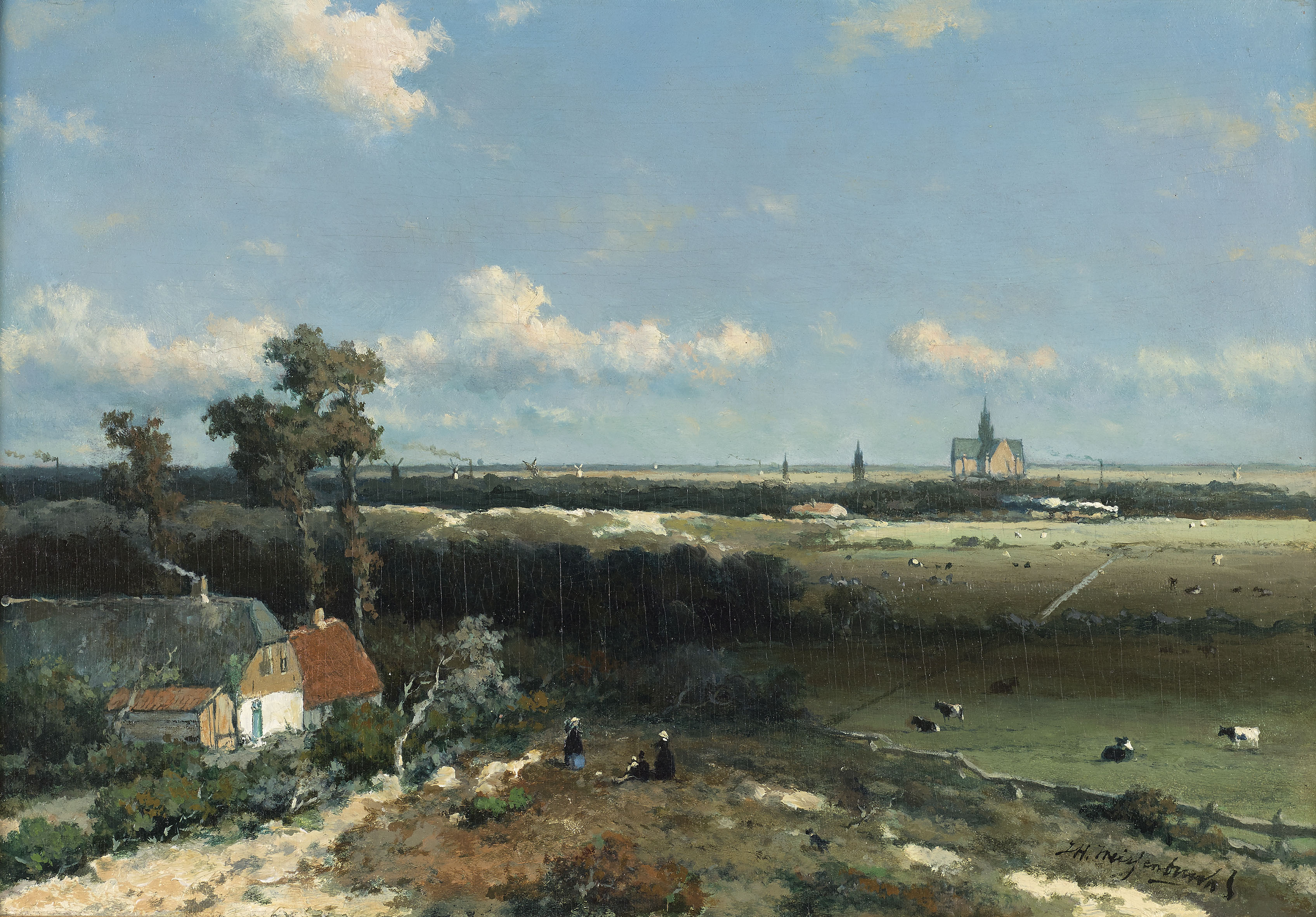
View of Haarlem, c. 1845 - 1848, Kunstmuseum Den Haag

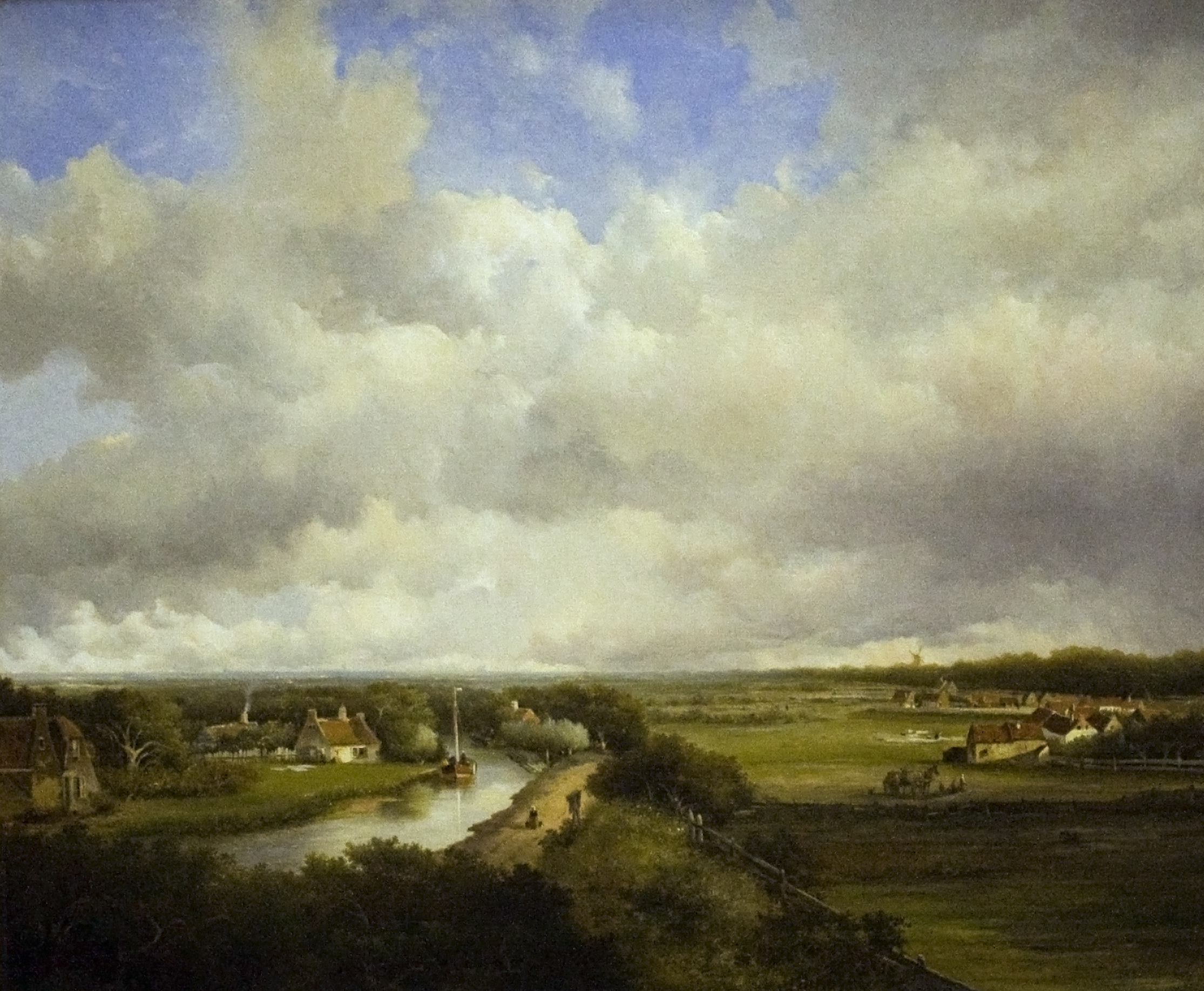
Dekkersduin, 1849, Teylers Museum

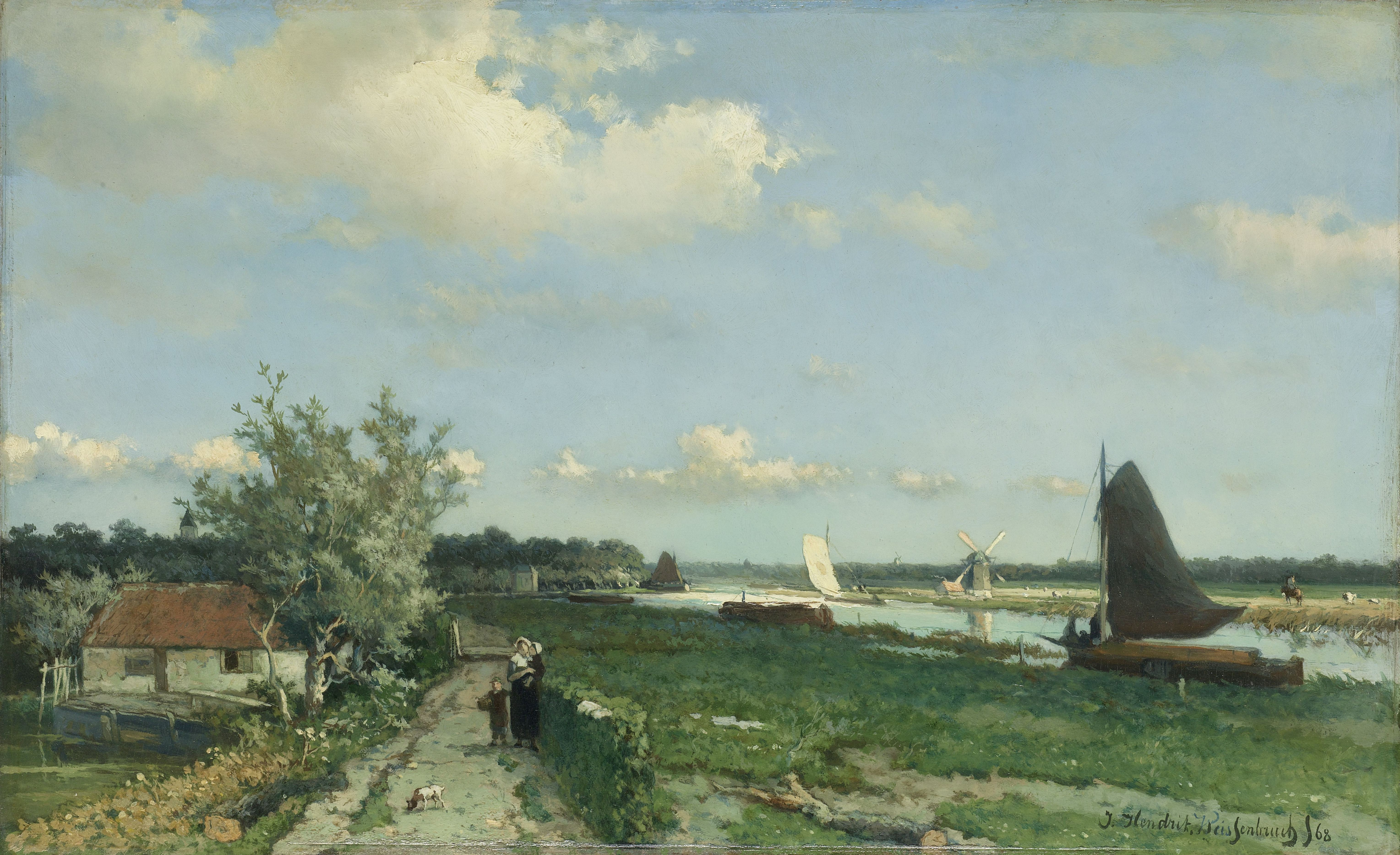
The Trekvliet near Rijswijk, 1868, Rijksmuseum Amsterdam

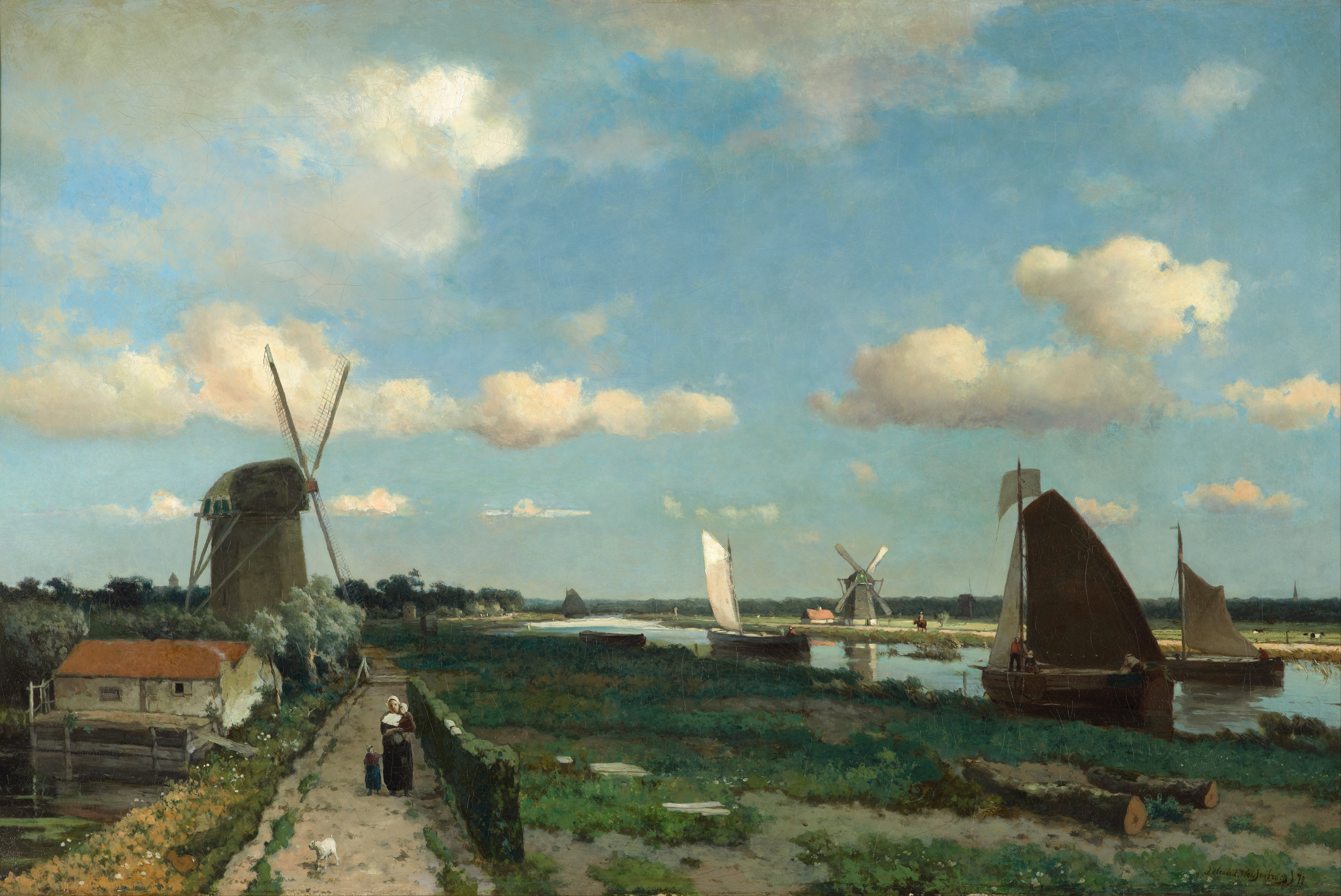
The Trekvliet, 1870, Kunstmuseum Den Haag

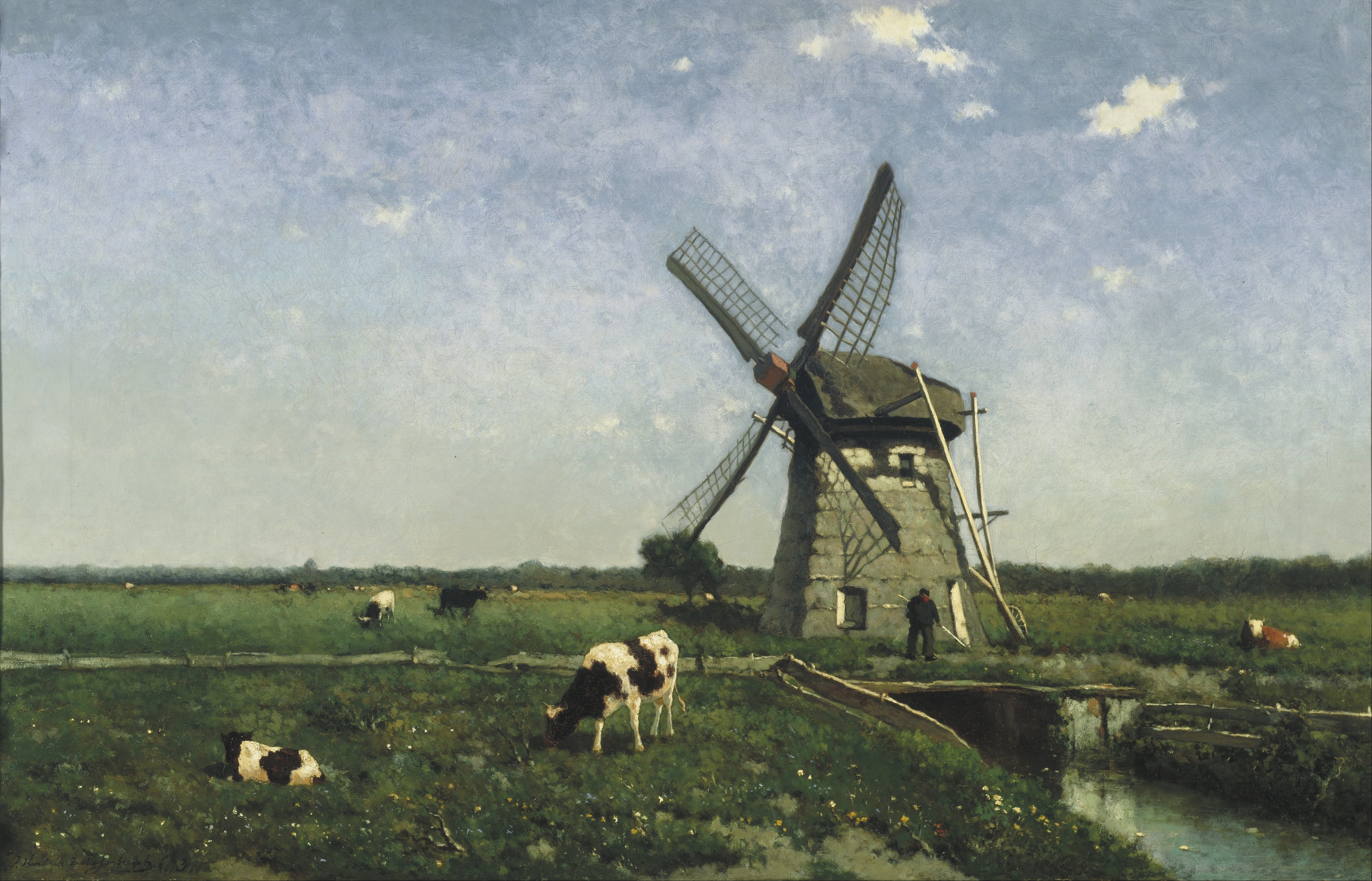
Landscape with Windmill near Schiedam, 1873, Museum Boijmans Van Beuningen

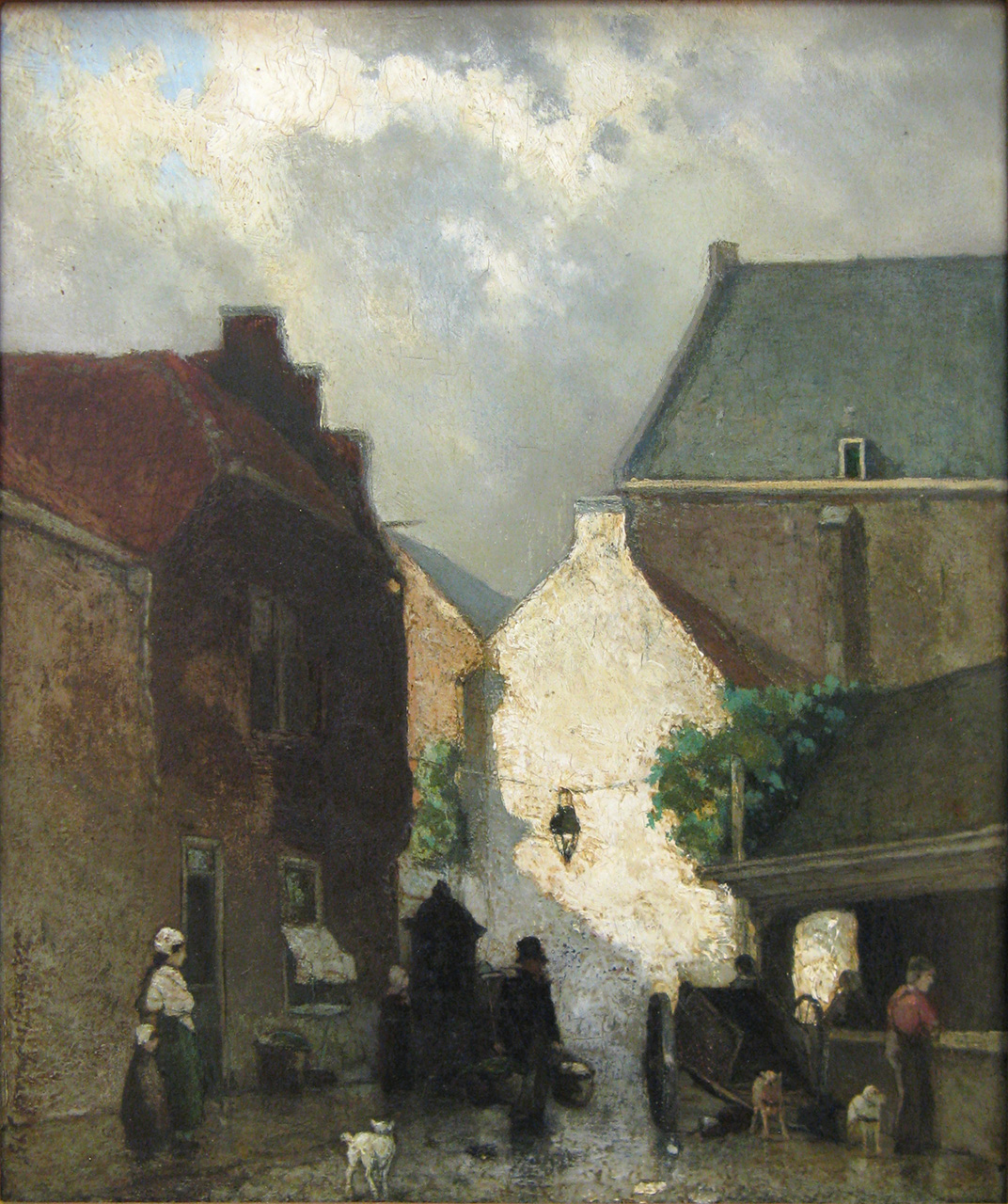
Fish Market in The Hague, 1873, Kunstmuseum Den Haag

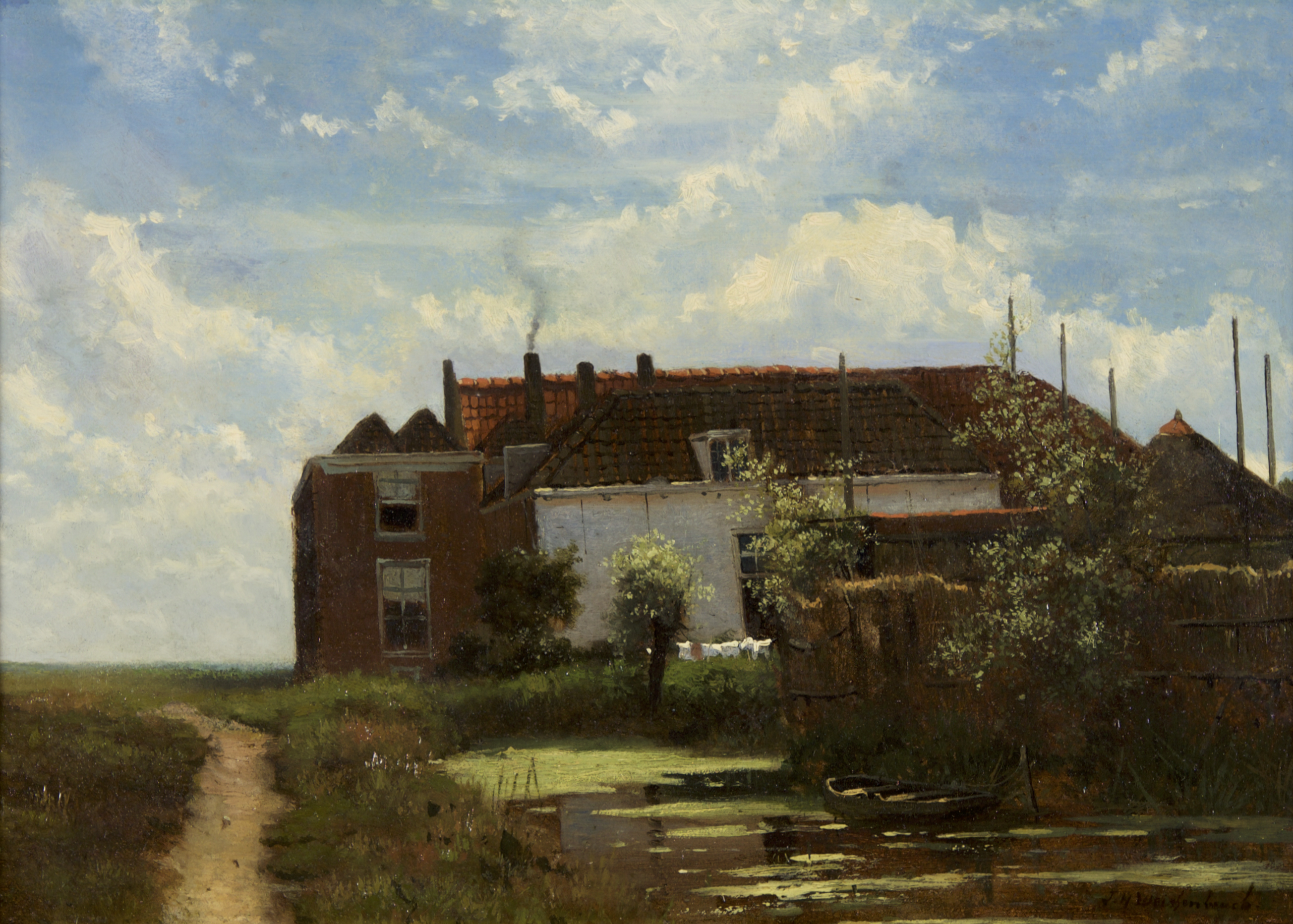
Farm by a Canal or The Clothesline c. 1873-1875 Dordrechts Museum

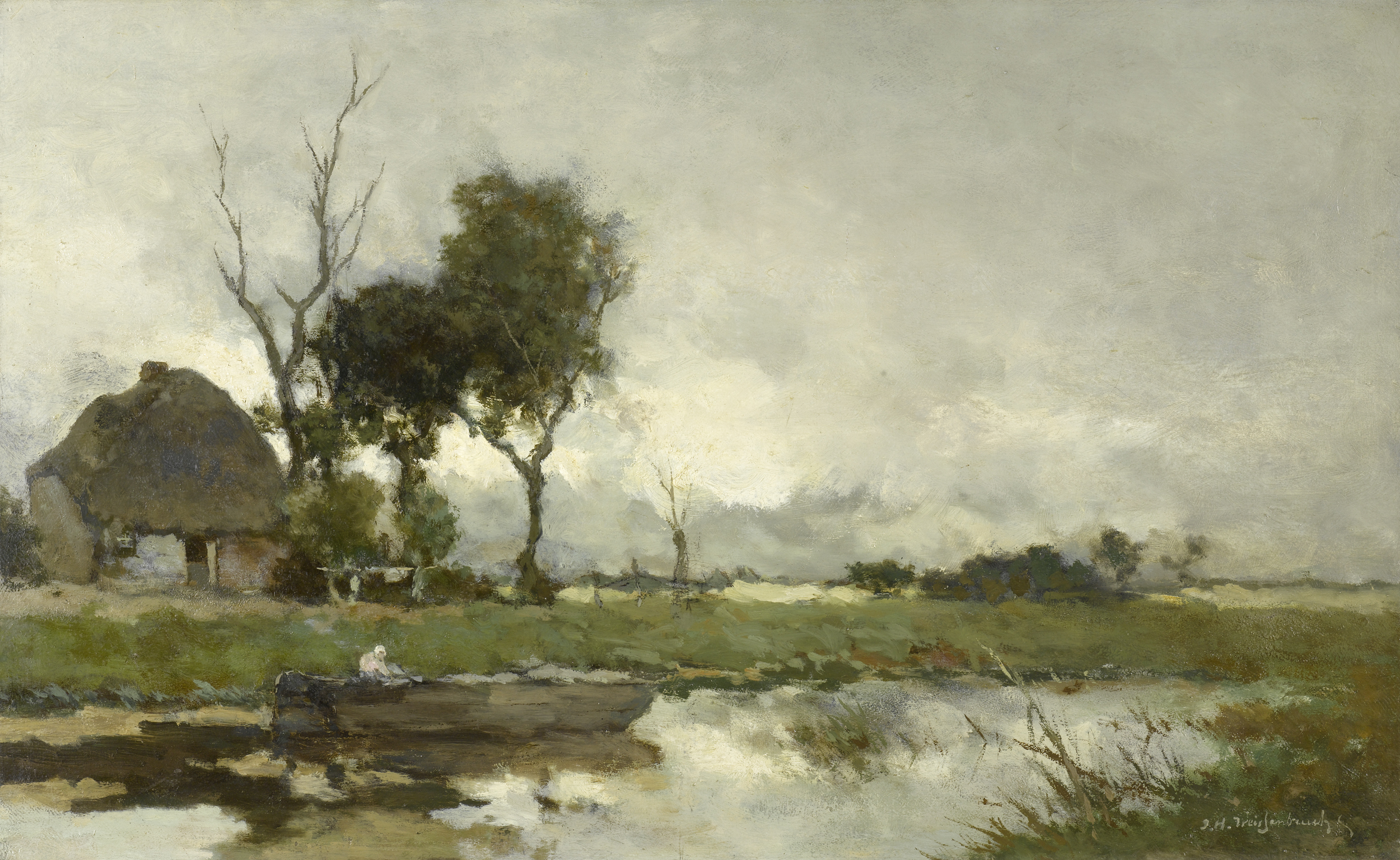
Autumn Landscape, c. 1880-1900, oil on canvas

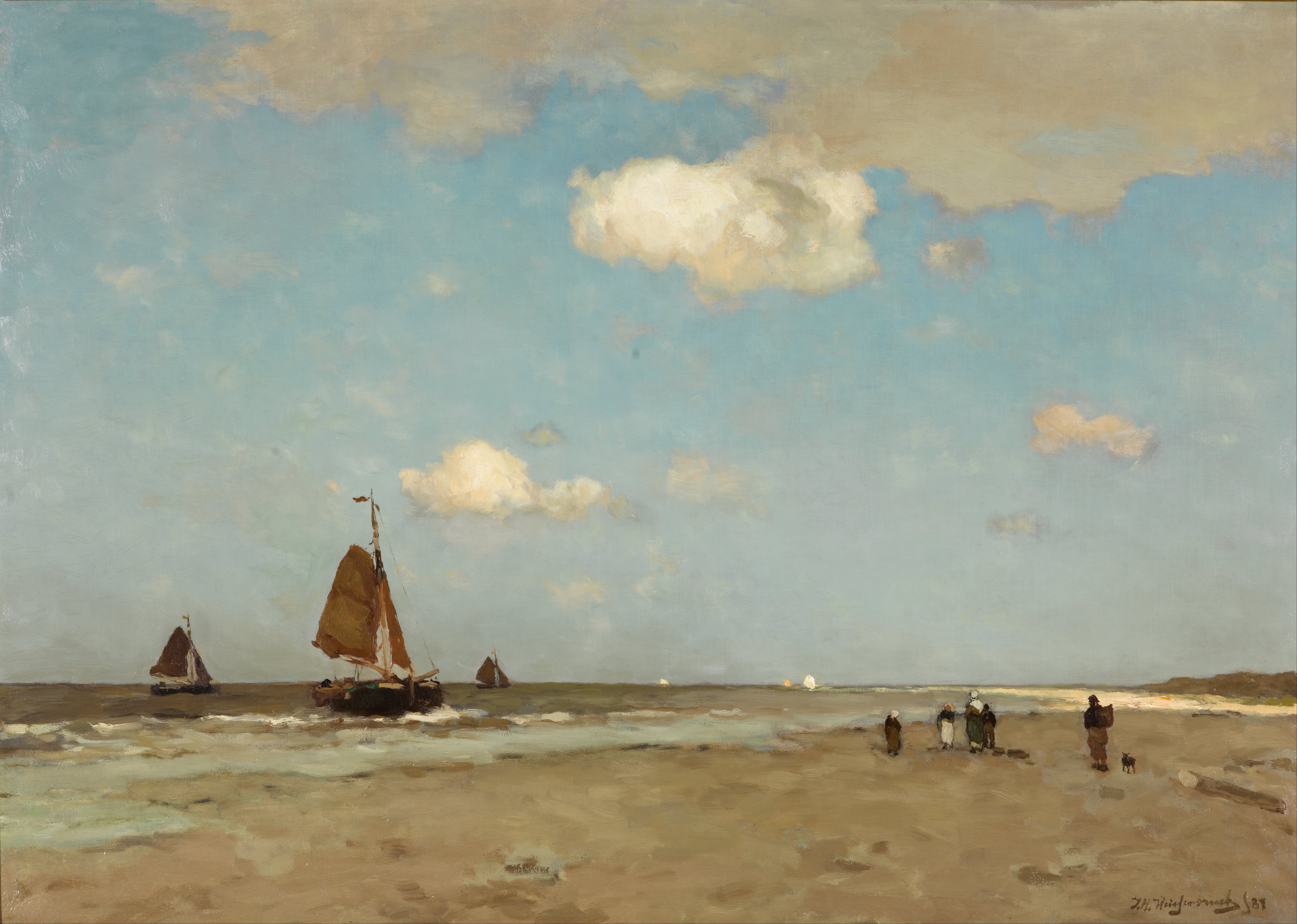
Beach scene, 1887, Kunstmuseum Den Haag

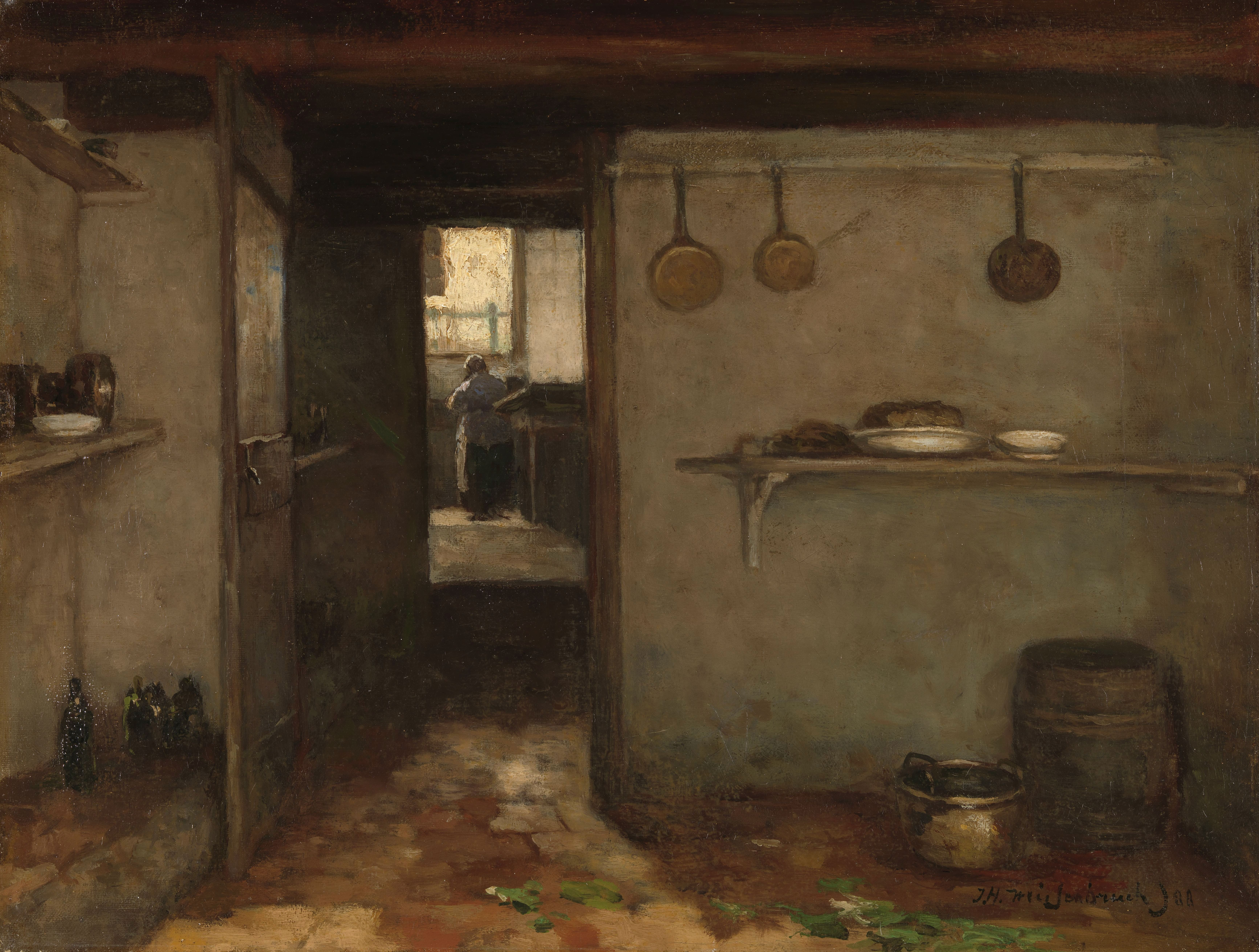
Weissenbruch's house in The Hague, 1888 Rijksmuseum Amsterdam

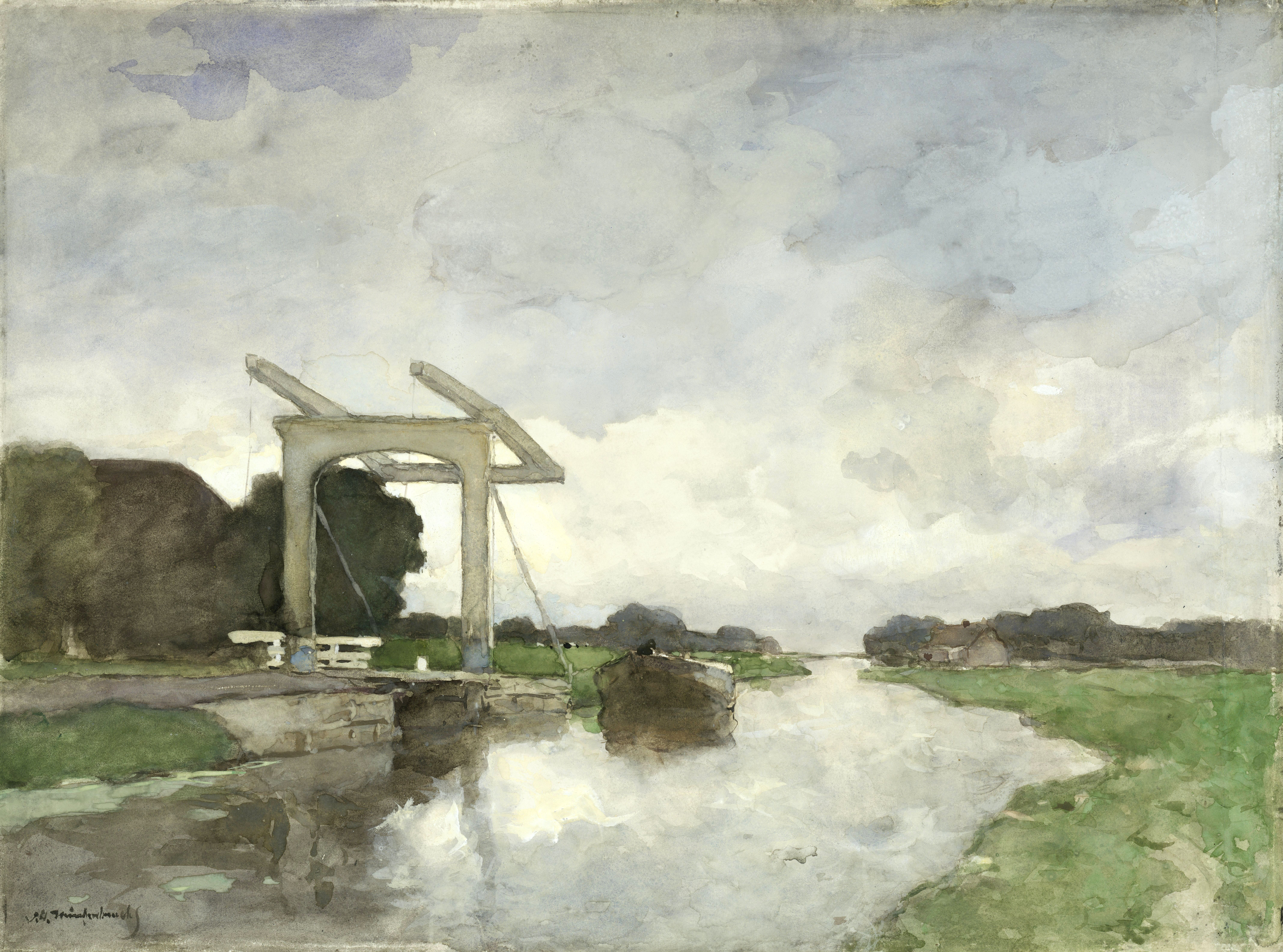
Drawbridge at Noorden, c. 1890, watercolor, Rijksmuseum Amsterdam

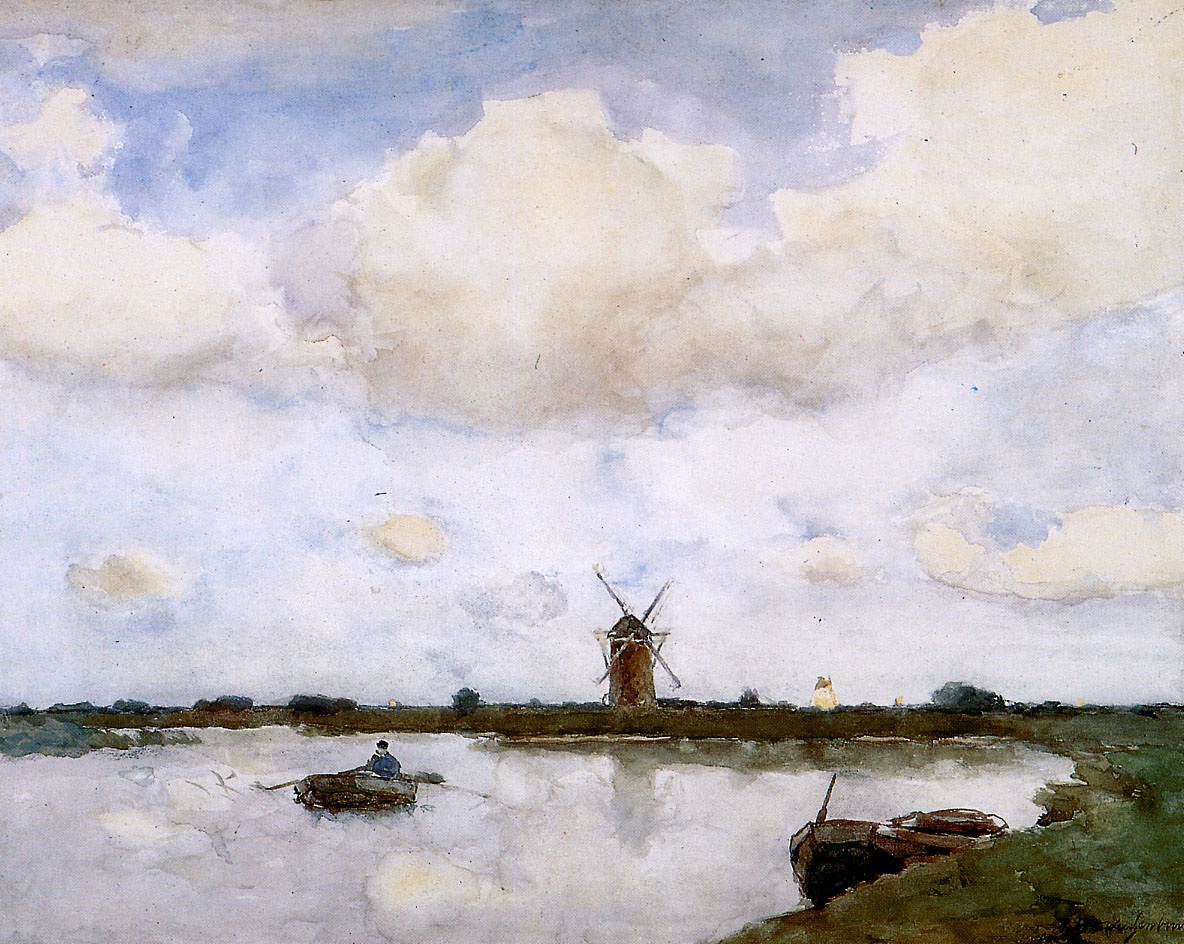
Mill by a Lake, c. 1890, watercolor, Museum Boijmans Van Beuningen

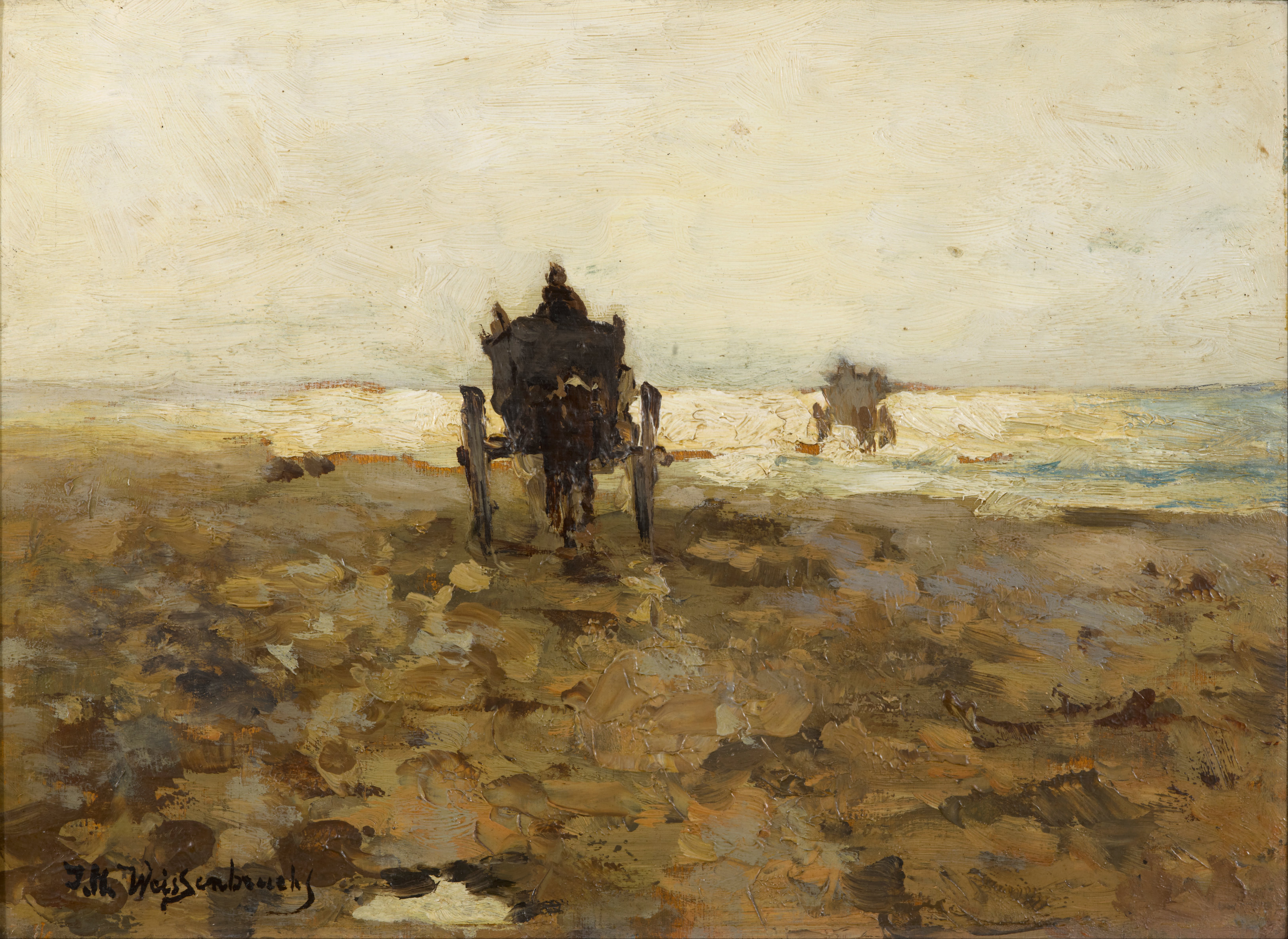
Shell cart, c. 1890, oil on panel

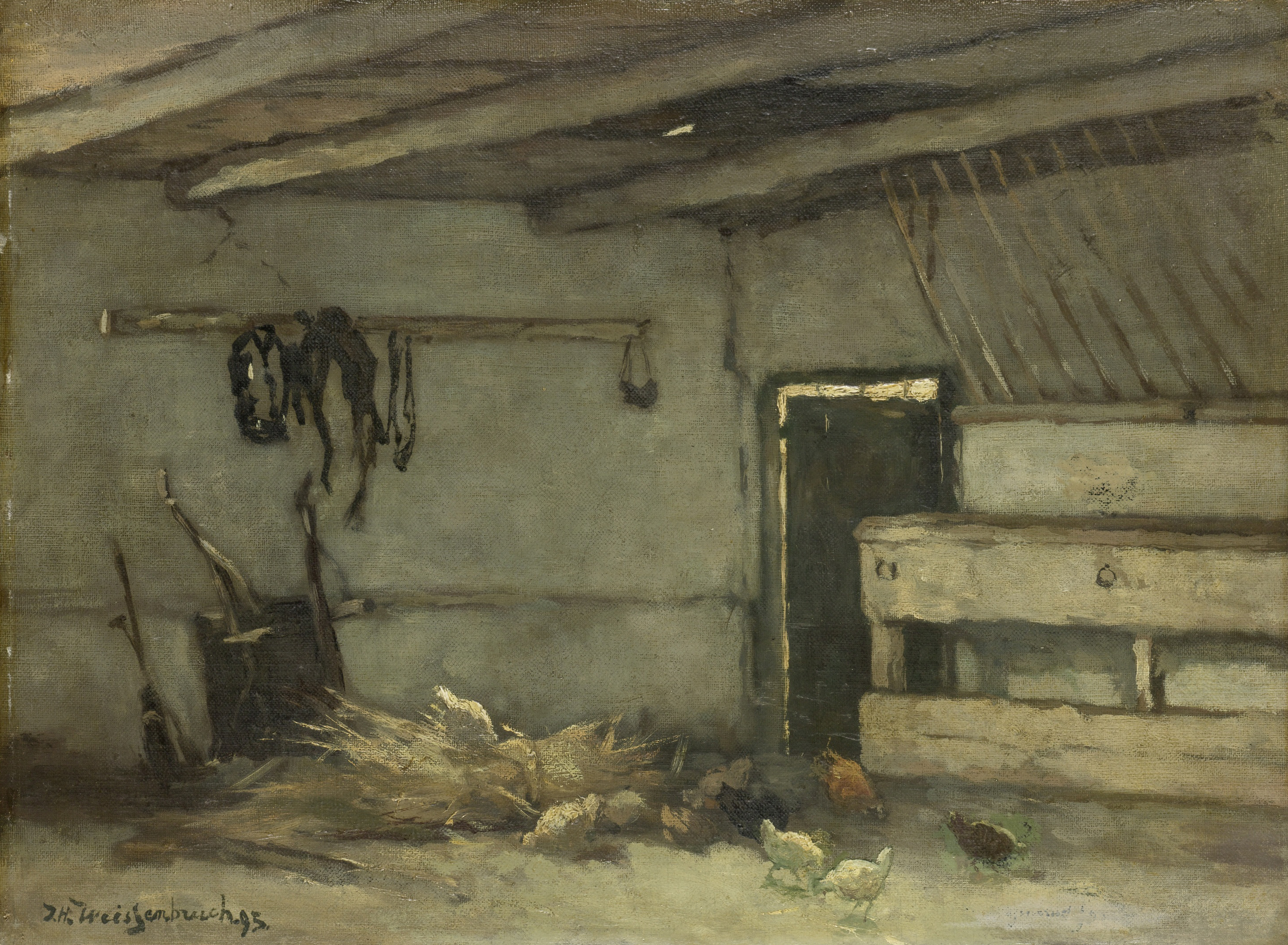
Stable Interior, 1895 Rijksmuseum Amsterdam

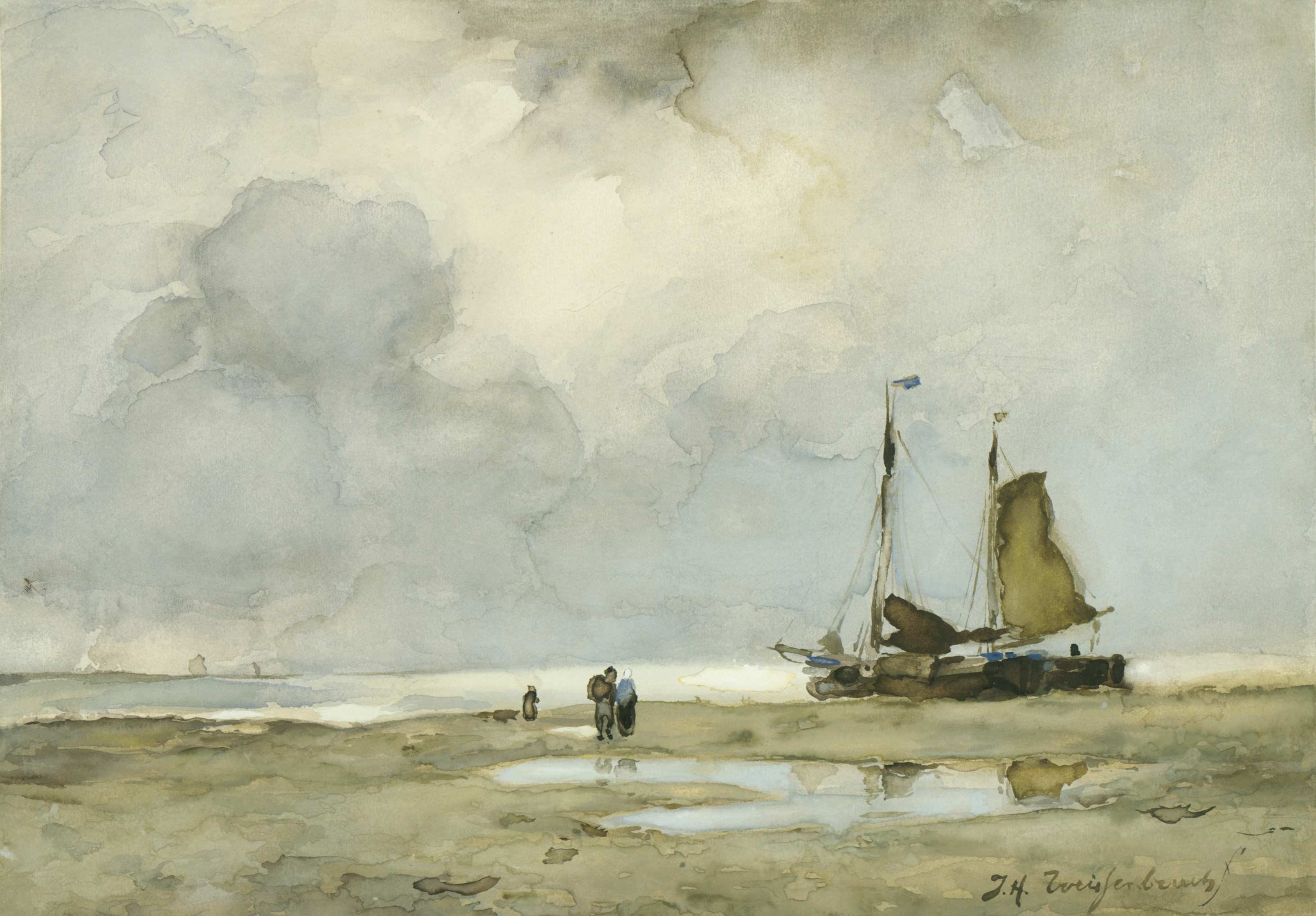
Beach Sight, 1895, watercolor on paper

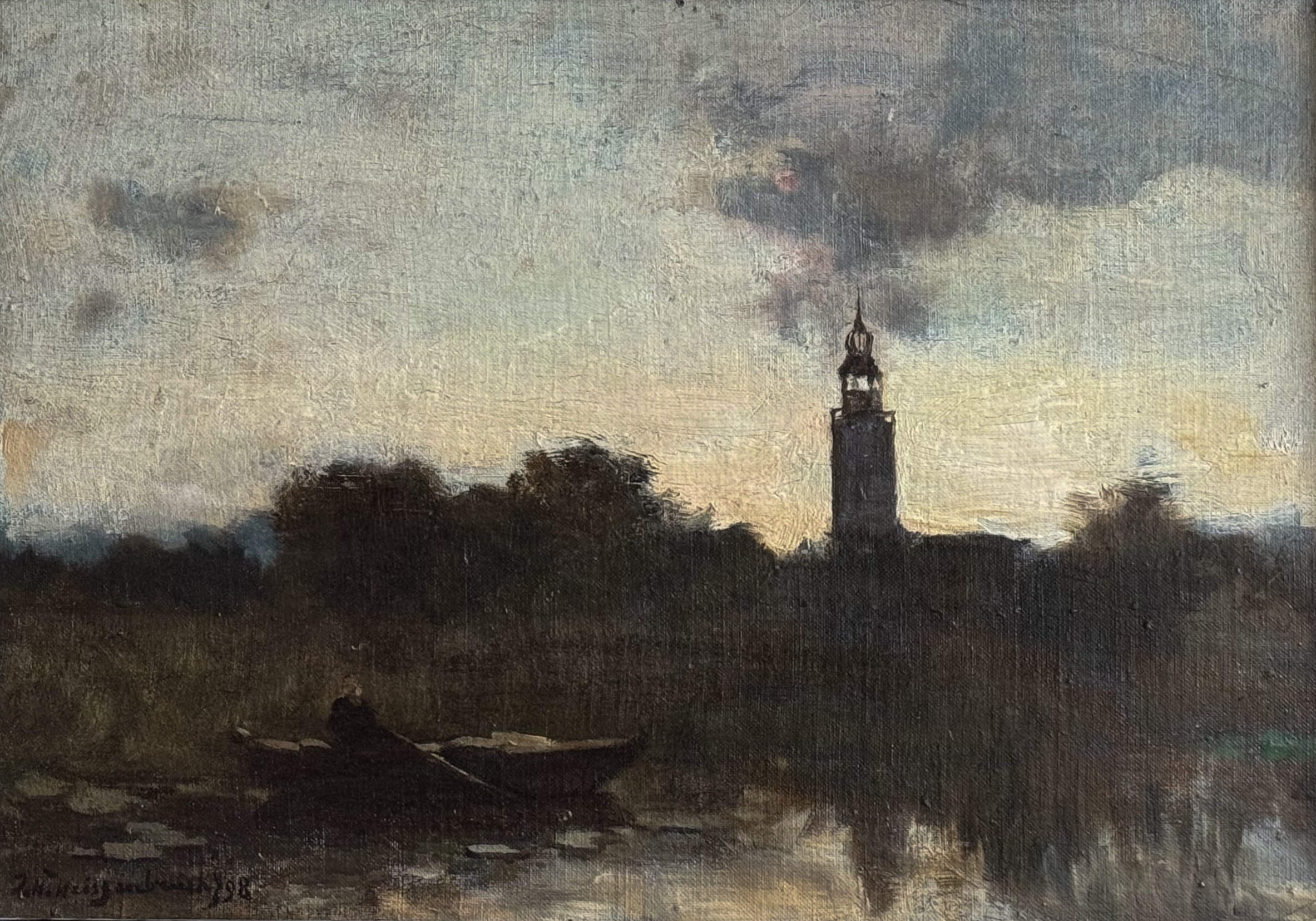
Fisherman at Evening in Nieuwkoop, 1898. Private collection

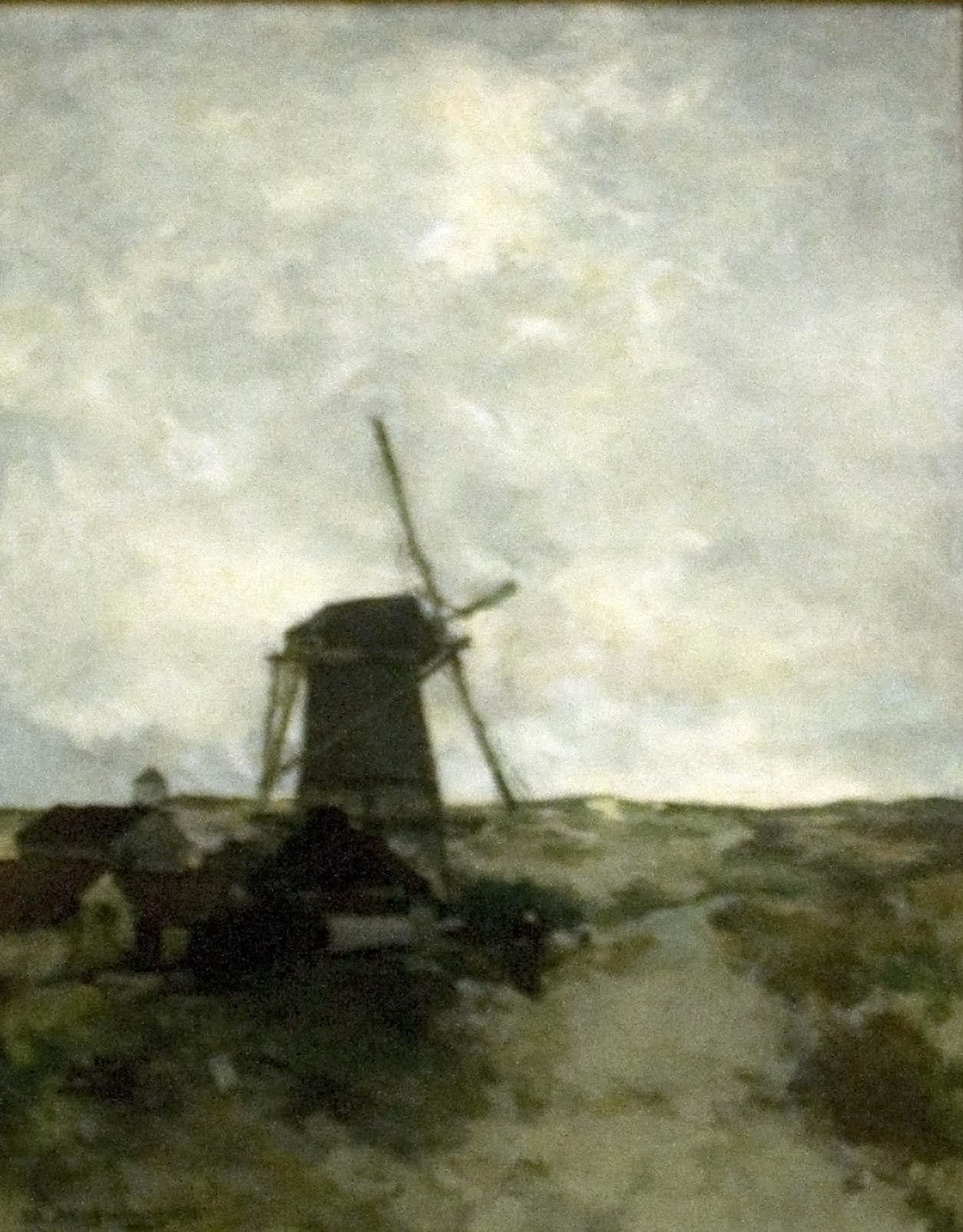
The Windmill, 1899, oil on canvas

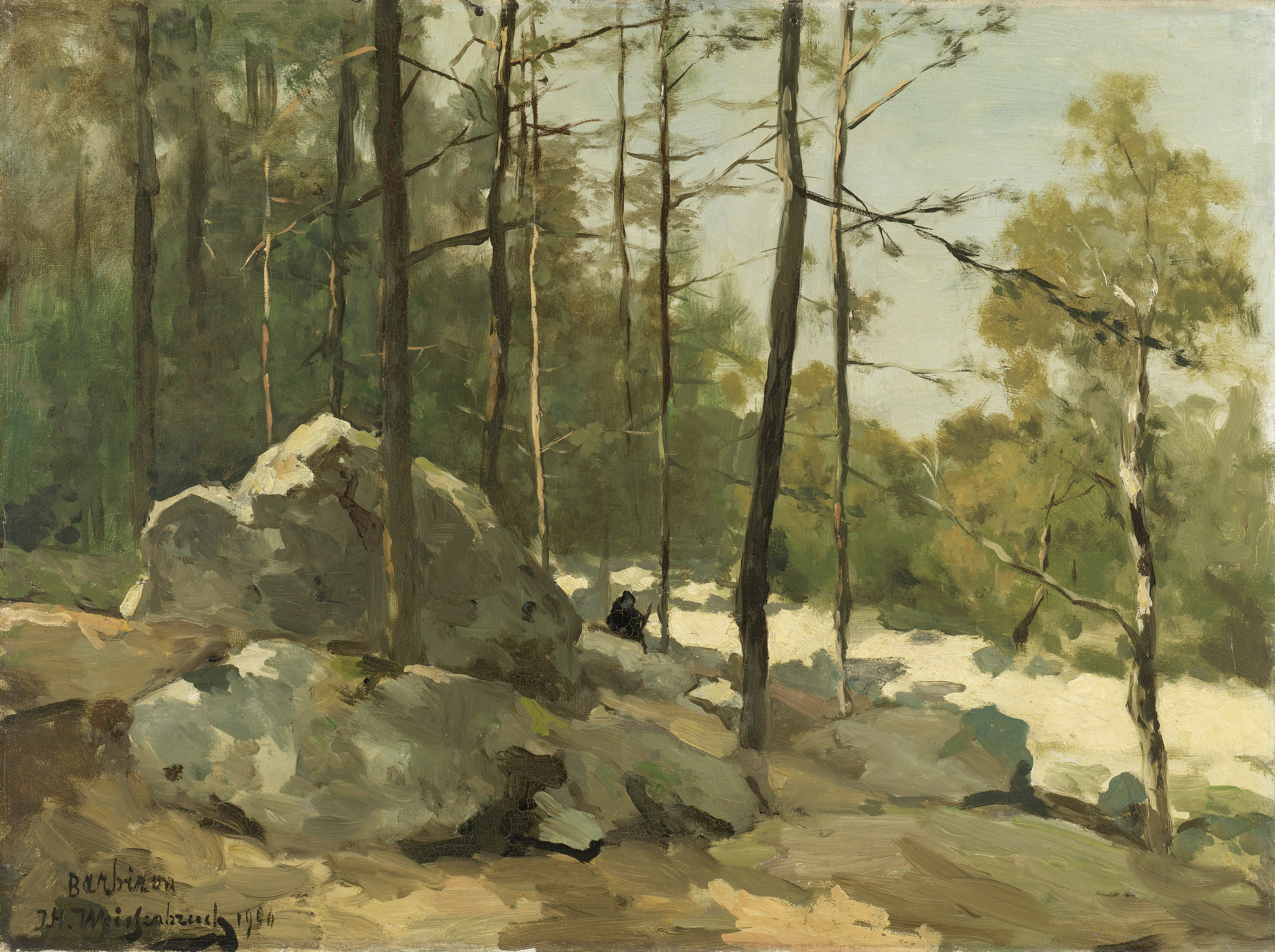
Forest View near Barbizon, 1900 Rijksmuseum Amsterdam

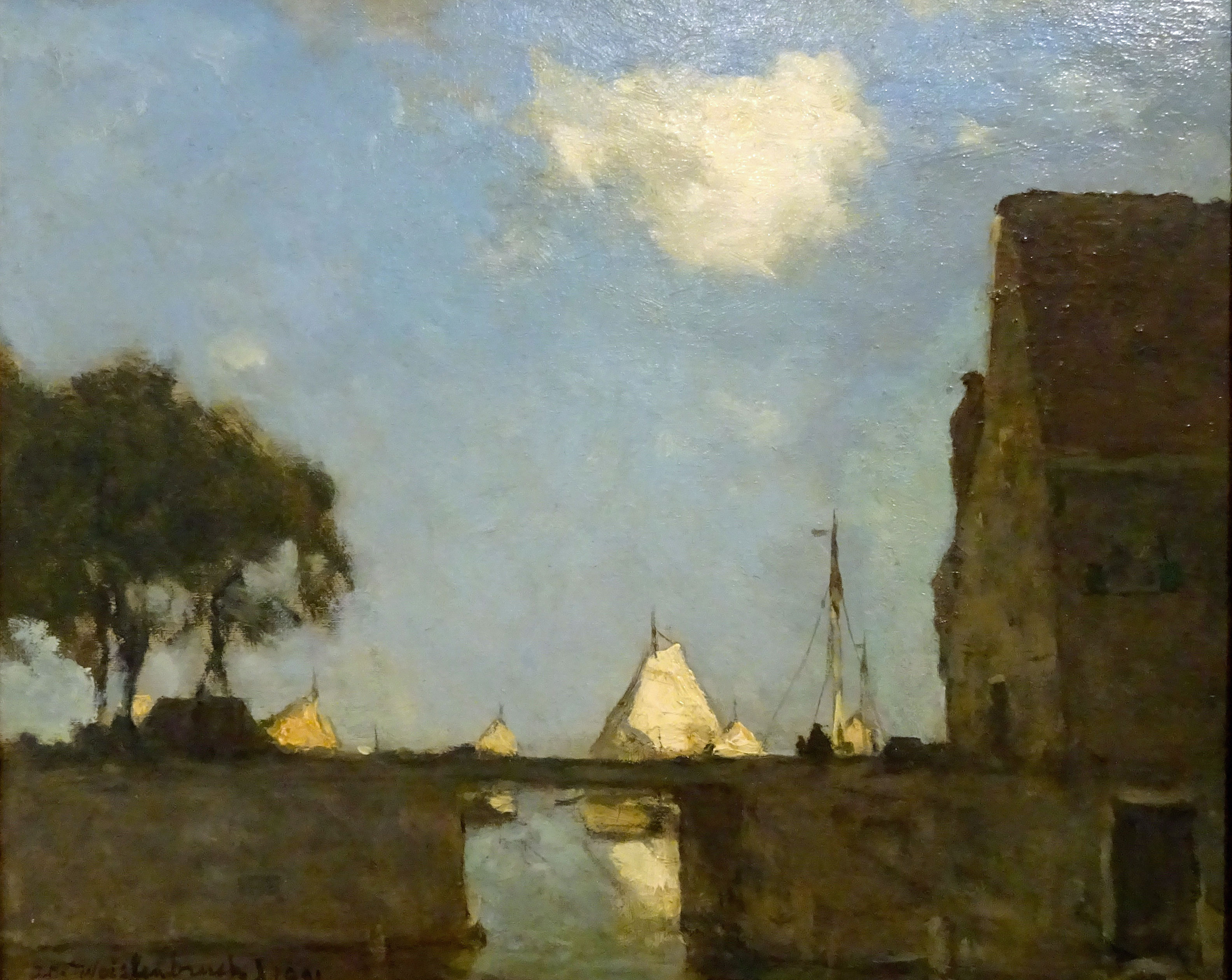
At Noorden near Nieuwkoop, 1901 Dordrechts Museum

Citations: [1] https://marksmit.nl/en/artist/hendrik-johannes-weissenbruch/ [2] https://www.google.nl/policies/faq [3] https://www.simonis-buunk.com/artwork/jan-hendrik-weissenbruch-painting-landscape-with-windmills/23828/ [4] https://www.wikiart.org/en/johan-hendrik-weissenbruch [5] https://www.artnet.com/artists/jan-hendrik-weissenbruch/ [6] https://www.invaluable.com/artist/weissenbruch-johan-hendrik-lb0f5wflsz/sold-at-auction-prices/ [7] https://www.artrenewal.org/artists/jan-hendrik-weissenbruch/2474 [8] https://www.artheroes.com/en/collection/jan-hendrik-weissenbruch/1209

== Museums with Weissenbruch's paintings ==
- Historisch Museum, Amsterdam.
- Rijksmuseum Amsterdam.
- Dordrecht Museum, Dortrecht.
- Rijksmuseum Twenthe, Enschede.
- Groninger Museum, Groningen.
- Teyler Museum, Haarlem.
- Gemeentemuseum, Den Haag.
- Museum Mesdag, Den Haag.
- Kasteel het Nijenhuis, Heino (part of Museum de Fundatie).
- Nijmeegs Museum Commanderie van St. Jan, Nijmegen.
- Jan Cunen Museum, Oss.
- Rijksmuseum Kröller—Müller, Otterlo.
- Historisch Museum, Rotterdam.
- Museum Boymans van Beuningen, Rotterdam.
- Lightner Museum, St. Augustine, Florida, USA

== Bibliography ==
- Sillevis, John & Tabak, Anne. The Hague School Book, Waanders Uitgegevers, Zwolle (2004), pp. 229–237
- Leeuw, Ronald de; Sillervis, John and Dumas, Charles (1983): The Hague School: Dutch Masters of the Nineteenth Century, Weidenfeld and Nicolson, London, ISBN 978-0-297-78219-3.
- Wright, Christopher (1980): Paintings in Dutch museum, Philip Wilson Publishers Liumited, London, ISBN 978-9-029-01303-1
- Denninger-Schreuder, Carole (2003): Schilders van Laren, Thoth – Uitgeverij, ISBN 978-9-068-68327-1.
- Koenraads, Jan P. (1985): Laren en zijn Schilders, Boekhandel Juli Kluvers, ISBN 978-9-071-16002-8.
- De Bodt, Saskia and Sellink, Manfred. Nineteenth Century Dutch Watercolors and Drawings, Museum Boijmans Van Beuningen, Rot
- Haagse Gemeentemuseum, De Haagse School Boek, ISBN 90-6730-052-7. Rotterdam, 1998.
