= Johan van Hell =

Dutch painter and musician

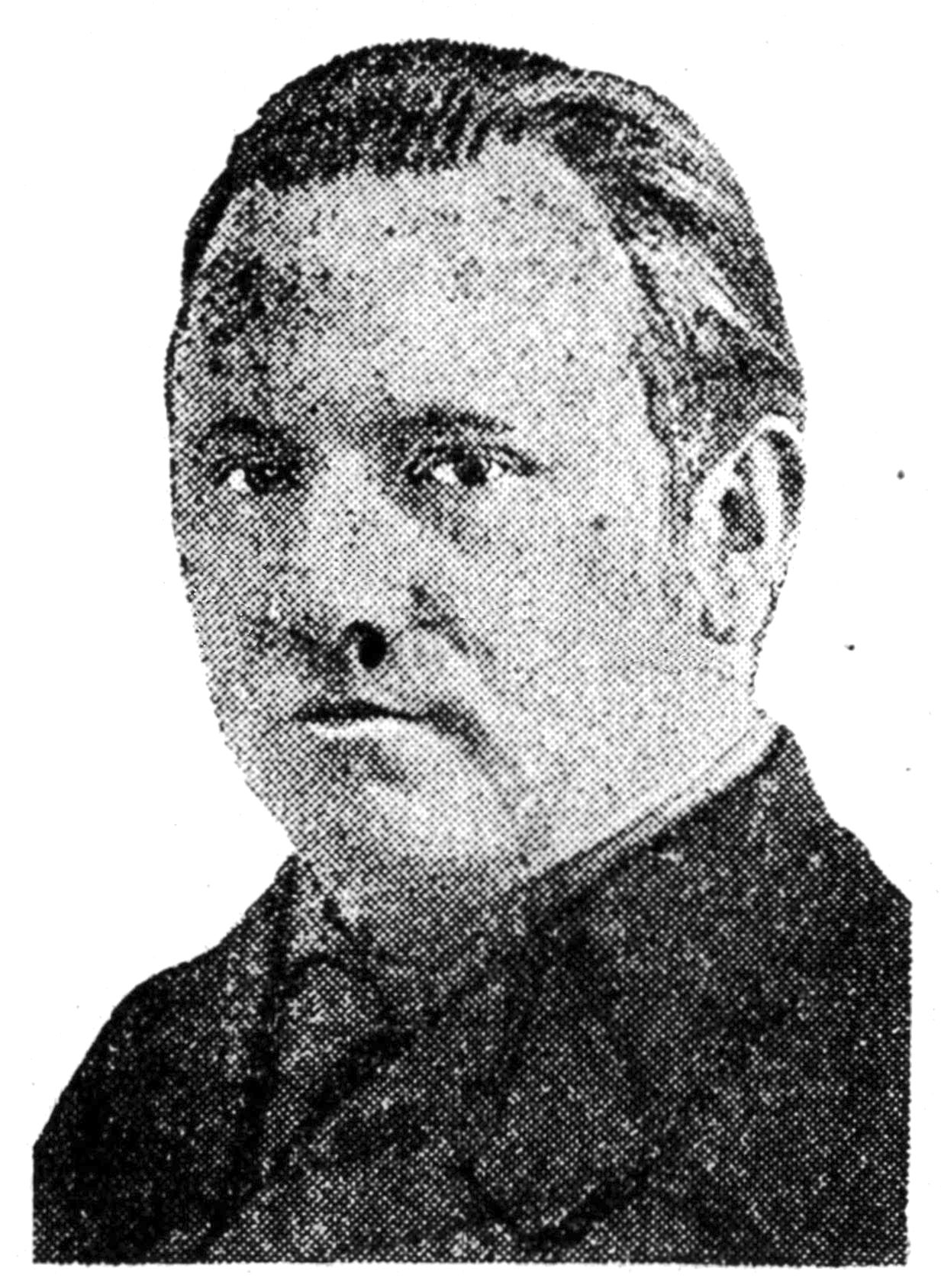
- Johan van Hell (1926)
- Occupation: Photographer

Olympic medal record

Art competitions
Bronze medal – third place	1924 Paris	Painting

Johannes "Johan" Gerardus Diederik van Hell (February 28, 1889 – December 31, 1952) was a Dutch visual artist and musician. His work was included in the 1939 exhibition and sale Onze Kunst van Heden (Our Art of Today) at the Rijksmuseum in Amsterdam. He was a dedicated socialist and a man with a highly developed social conscience. Many of his later works depict the struggles and plight of ‘the man in the street’. In 1925, he decided to produce lithographs to make art available at a reasonable price to the working class. He also gave free private art and music lessons to gifted students who could not afford the tuition.

His art oeuvre is varied, ranging from oil paintings, water colours, wood cuts and lithographs to political posters, ex-libris and magazine and book covers and illustrations. He also received regular commissions from the City of Amsterdam for monumental art. His music was at least as important to him as his art. His instrument was the clarinet, but he also played the oboe. He regularly performed with Amsterdam's Concertgebouw Orchestra but refused a permanent position. In his last years his music took precedence over his art.

A major exhibition of his works in the Museum of Modern Art in Arnhem, The Netherlands, in 2005/06 (see 'Chronology') was accompanied by the publication of a book highlighting his life and his artistic career as well as his music career. The book also contained a catalogue of all his known oeuvre. A second edition of this book, revised, updated and much expanded, was published early in 2015 and is now available in the bookstores of various art museums in Holland. Its language is Dutch.

== Chronology ==
1889: Johannes Gerardus Diederik (Johan) van Hell was born on February 28, 1889, in Amsterdam as the third child of Jacobus Johannes van Hell and Aartje Reijnders.

Approx. 1903: First lessons in painting by G.W.Knap. Followed music lessons, probably at Amsterdam's Volksmuziekschool (People's Music Academy).

1903 – 1906: Quellinusschool, decorative painting (diploma).

1906 – 1909: State College for Art Teachers (certificate). Certificate ‘Drawing and Perspective’, August 26, 1909.

1909 – 1913: State academy for the Visual Arts, drawing course, painting course and model course. Secondary Education Certificate ‘Hand and Geometrical Drawing’, July 9, 1912. Lessons in lithography at the van Leer company. Lessons in wood cutting by a graphic artist, J.G. Veldheer. Clarinet lessons by Piet Swager.

1909: Relationship with Paulina (‘Pau’) Maria Louise Wijnman (1889–1930).

1911 – 1916: Employed as art teacher at the Hendrick de Keyser, the J.P.Coen and the Frans Hals Schools, all in Amsterdam.

1915: Marriage to Pauline Wijnman, visual artist and costume designer, November 12, 1915.

1915 – 1927: Appointed permanent substitute clarinettist with the Concertgebouw Orchestra of Amsterdam.

1917 – 1918: Mobilized for 20 months, serving in the Dutch army, billeted in the province of Brabant.

1918: Formation of the Arbeiders Jeugd Centrale (AJC) (Workers’ Youth League), the youth movement of the Sociaal Democratische Arbeiders Partij, and the NVV trade union. Both Pau van Hell-Wijnman and Johan van Hell were actively involved in this movement.

1919 – 1920: Art teacher at the High School for Girls, Amsterdam.

1920 – 1923: Art teacher at the Frans Hals School, Amsterdam.

1921: First Van Hell exhibition, Rotterdamse Kunstkring (Rotterdam Art Circle).

1922: Exhibition in the Concertgebouw, with the painting Blaassextet (Wind Sextet) which painting is still owned and exhibited by the Concertgebouw.

1923-1939: Regularly travels to France, Austria and Switzerland, as witnessed by a number of his paintings and drawings.

1924: Olympic bronze medallion for Schaatsenrijders (The Skaters) at the Concours de peinture, Paris. Visit to Paris with the Concertgebouw Orchestra.

1924 – 1925: Art teacher at the High School for Girls, Amsterdam

Approx. 1925: Teacher at the Music Lyceum and the Volksmuziekschool (People's School for Music), Amsterdam. Starting in the early 1930s he taught clarinet at home.

1926 – 1941: Member of Art Association De Brug, of which he was co-founder in 1926 and chairman in 1934.

1926: Co-founder of Hollandse Kamermuziek Vereniging (HKV) (Netherlands Chamber Music Association). Participated regularly in its concerts.

1927: Left the Concertgebouw Orchestra. Co-founder Socialistische Kunstenaarskring (SKK) (Socialist Artist Circle) which operated until 1934.

1927 – 1945: Art teacher at the Adama van Scheltema and Ruysdael Schools, Amsterdam. Also, in 1927–1928, at the De Bazel School and in 1929 at the Friso School, both in Amsterdam.

1930: International exhibition Socialistische Kunst Heden (Socialist Art Today) in the Municipal Museum, Amsterdam, organised by the SKK. Formation of the Nederlandse Vereniging voor Hedendaagse Muziek (NVHM) (Netherlands Association for Contemporary Music); participated in some of its concerts. Pau van Hell-Wijnman died on October 2, 1930.

1932: Left the SDAP and joined the Onafhankelijke Socialistische Partij (OSP) (Independent Socialist Party). Gramophone record of Johan van Hell (clarinet) and Daniel Ruyneman (piano), NVHM.

1933: Marriage to Caroline Adolphine Lankhout (1895–1947) on June 14.

1934 – 1952: Permanent position as art teacher at the Friso School. Additionally, he taught at the De Lairesse School (1936–1937) (temporary assignment), at the Vincent van Gogh School (1937-1942 and 1945–1952), the Van Heutsz. (1941–1945) and Frankendael Schools, and finally at the Amstel School (1945–1952, all in Amsterdam.

1935 – 1939: Participated in exhibitions organized by the Populistenkring (Populist Circle), in existence from 1935 until 1939.

1940: Vice-chairman of the Vereniging tot Bevordering der Grafische Kunst (VBGK) (Association for the Promotion of Graphic Art). In May, the Netherlands was invaded and occupied by German forces. Van Hell refused to join the Nazi-imposed Culture Chamber.

1947: Caroline Lankhout died on July 28.

1952: Art teacher at the Barlaeus Gymnasium high school

1952: Johan van Hell died on December 31, 1952, of an acute kidney inflammation in the Weesperplein Hospital in Amsterdam.

1976: 'Rediscovered’ by Thom Mercuur, then Director of Museum ‘t Coopmanshus (today Museum Martena) in Franeker (Province of Friesland). First post-Second World War exhibition totally dedicated to Van Hell was first featured in Franeker, then in various museums in The Netherlands including the Stedelijk Museum Amsterdam.

2005-2006: Exhibition “Van de Straat” featuring a major collection of Van Hell's art. Publication of an illustrated catalogue of all his known oeuvre.

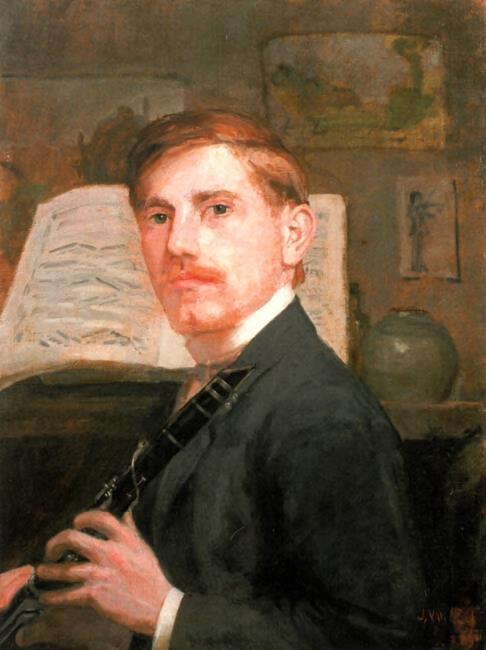
Self-portrait with clarinet (1909)

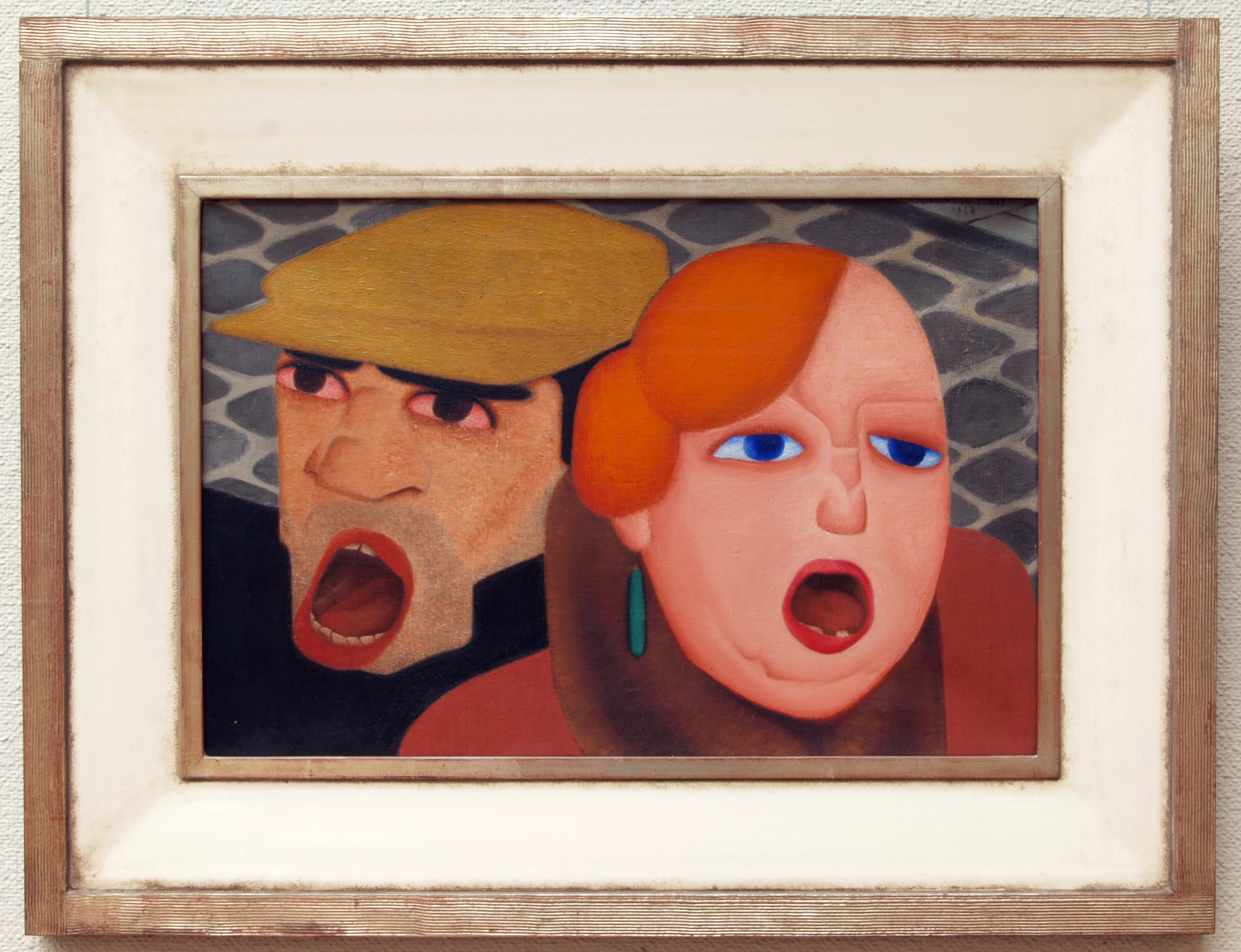
Street singers (1928)

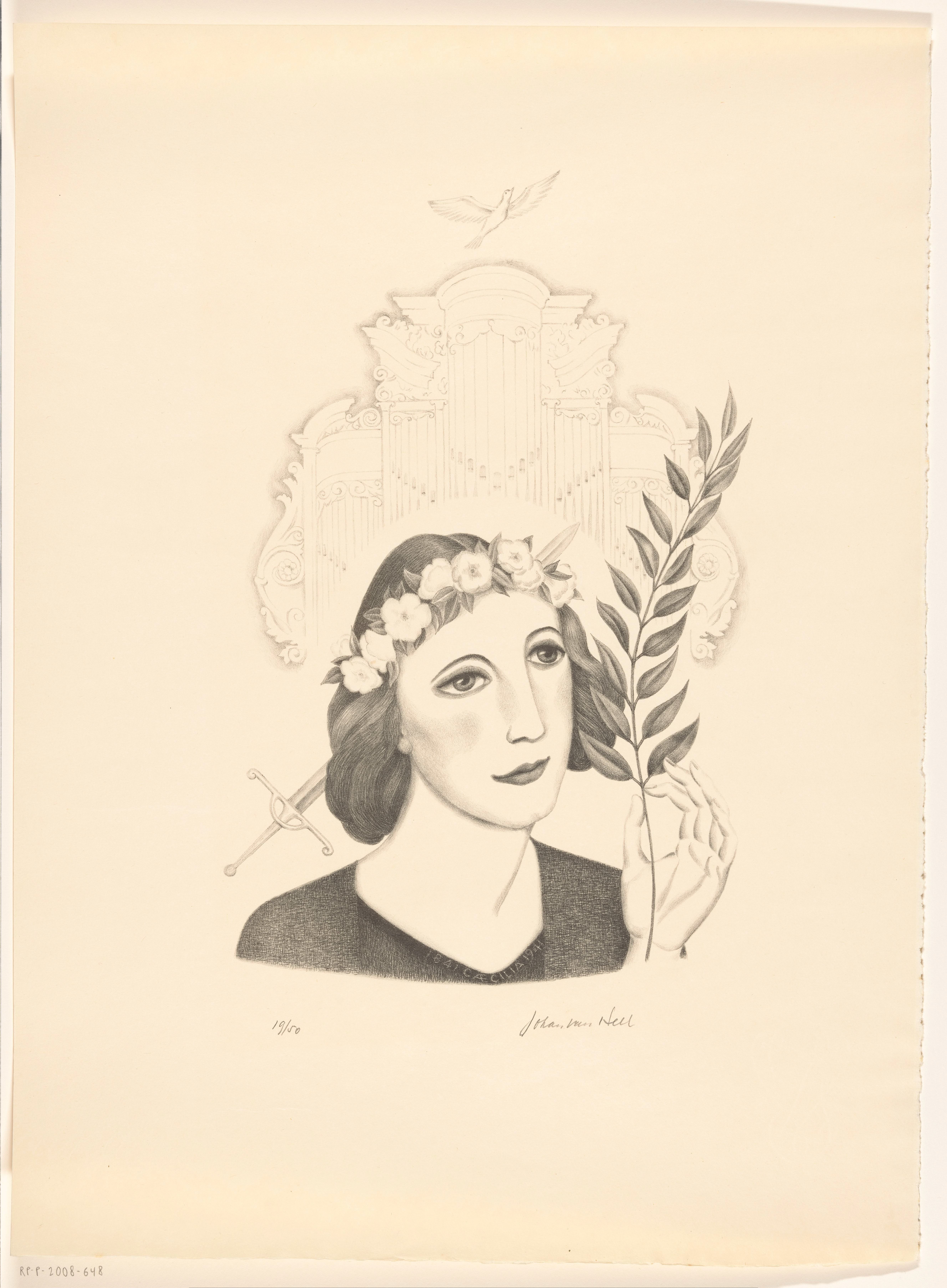
Caecilia (1941)

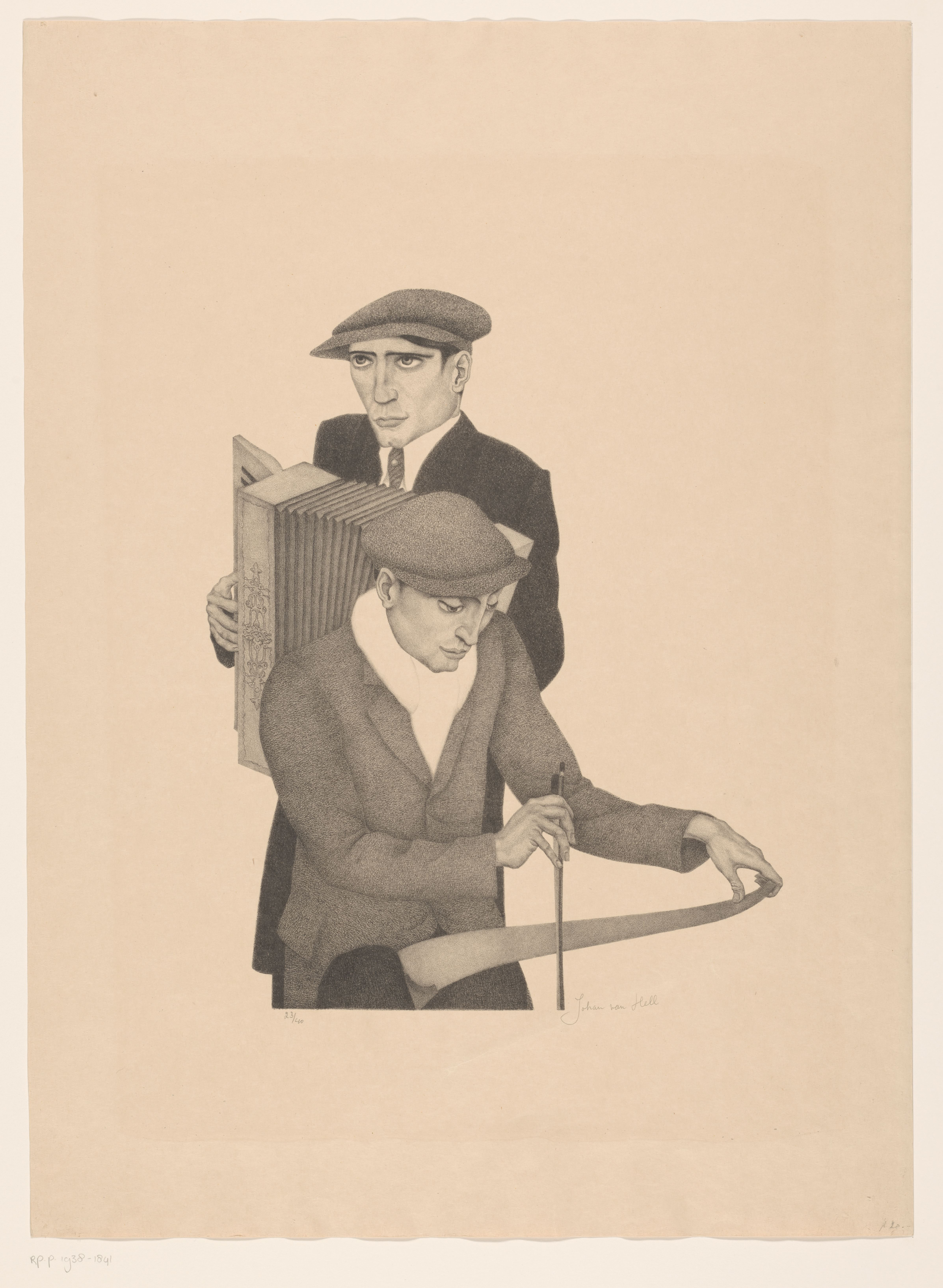
Musical saw

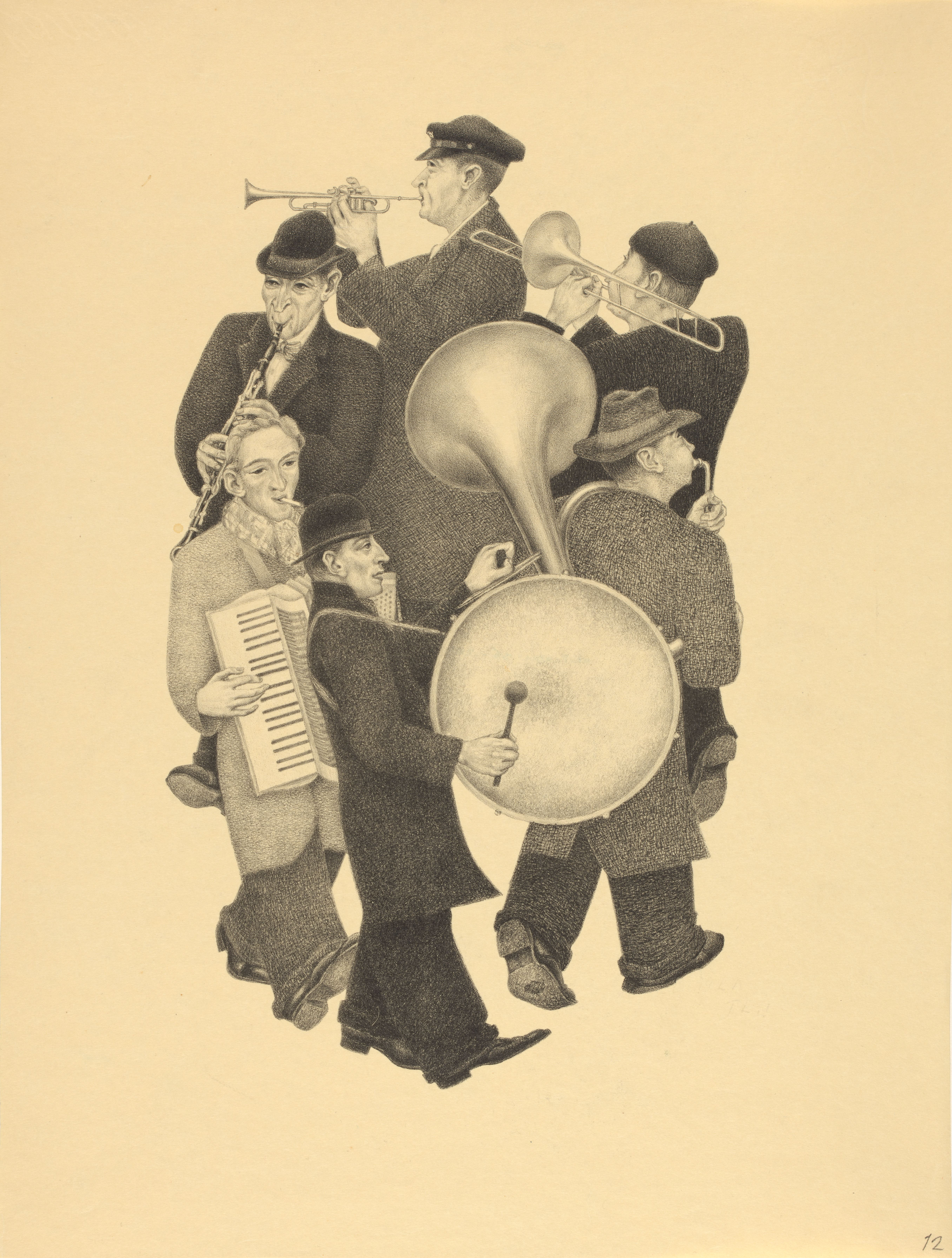
Conga line
