= Fré Cohen =

Dutch artist and graphic designer (1903–1943)

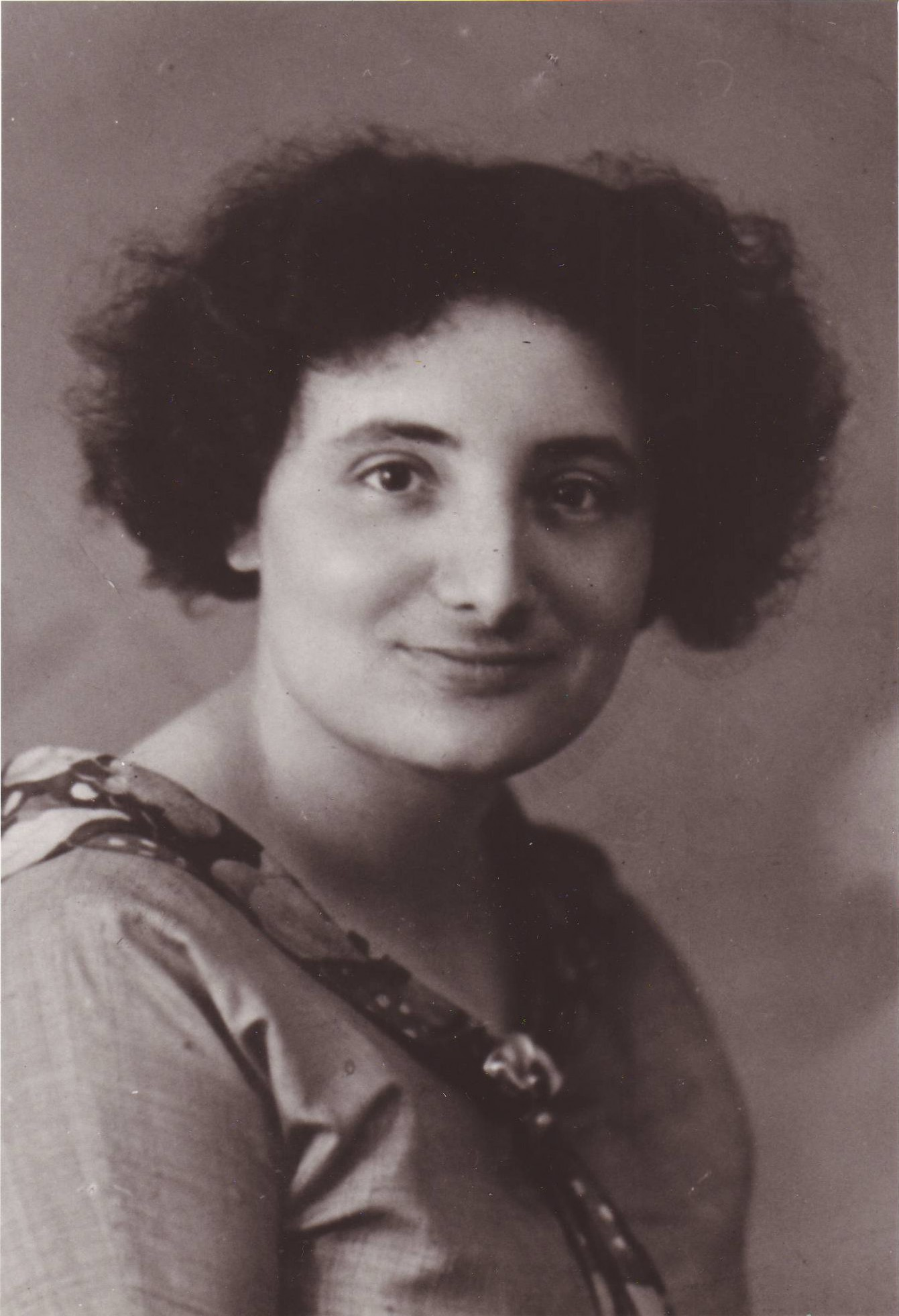
- Born: Frederika Sophia Cohen; 11 August 1903; Amsterdam, Netherlands
- Died: 14 June 1943 (aged 39); Hengelo, Netherlands
- Education: Quellinusschool

Frederika Sophia "Fré" Cohen (11 August 1903 – 14 June 1943) was a Dutch artist and graphic designer.

== Early life ==
Frederika Sophia Cohen was born on 11 August 1903 in Amsterdam in the Netherlands. She was the oldest daughter of diamond cutter Levie Cohen, a member of the Social-Democrat Jewish community in Amsterdam. Like many other diamond workers Levie Cohen was often out of work. Therefore, the Cohen family moved to Antwerp in Belgium, where there was more work in the diamond business. After the outbreak of the Great War in 1914, the family returned to Amsterdam.

== Design ==
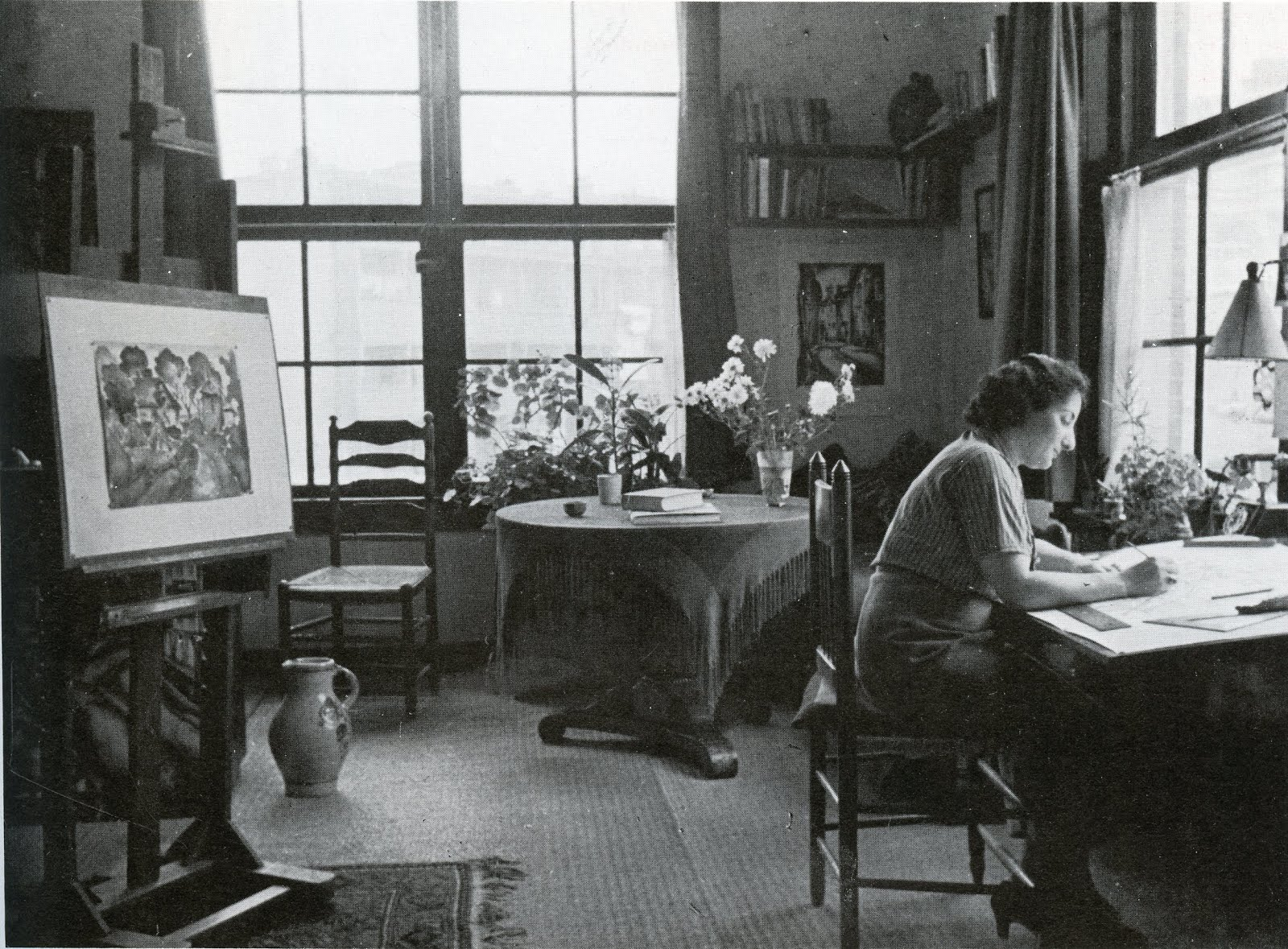
Fré Cohen at work in her atelier in Amsterdam in 1937

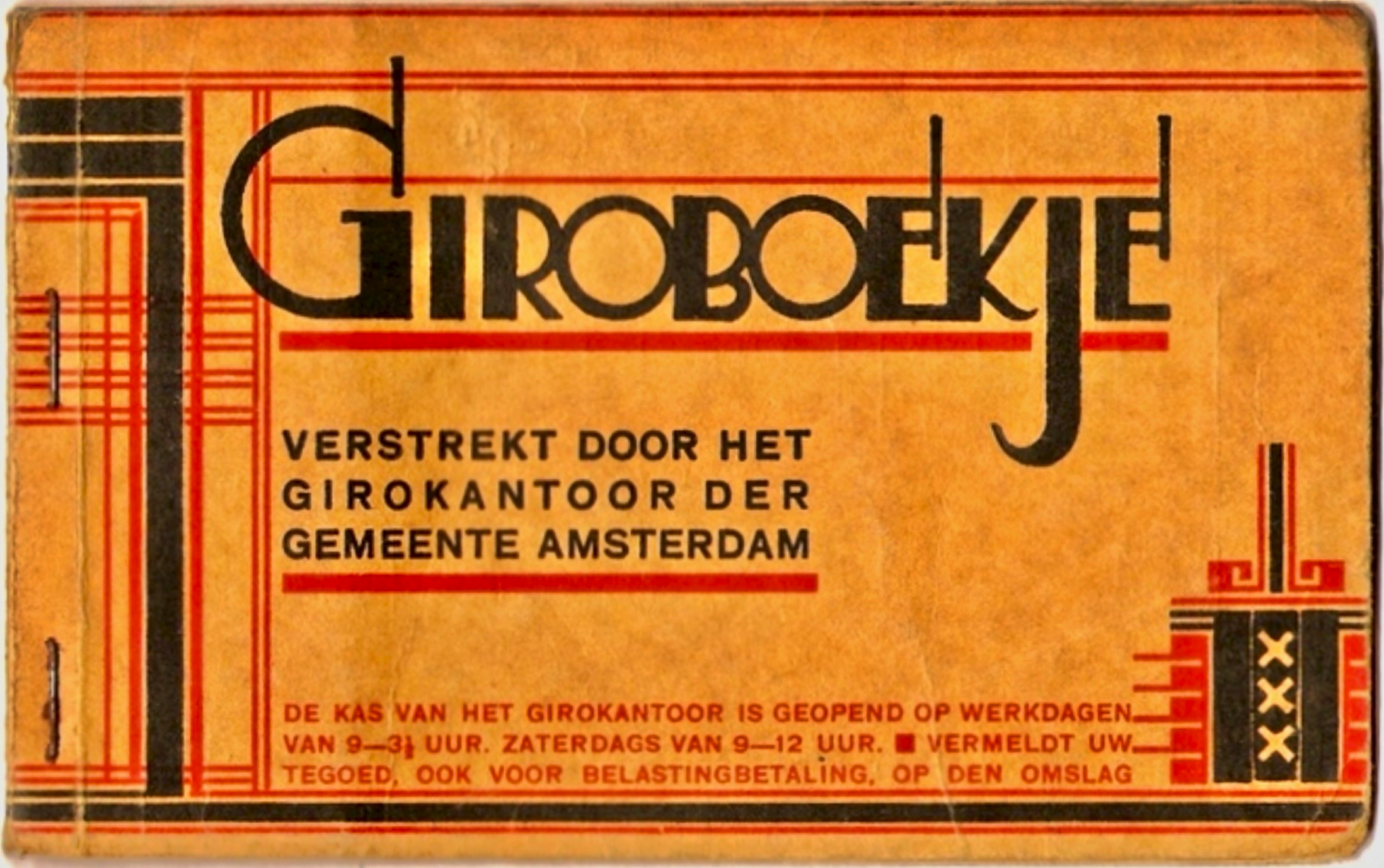
Booklet of the municipal giro bank from the 1930s

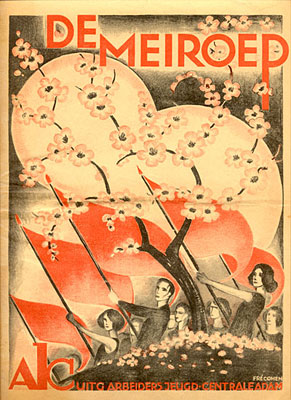
De Meiroep ('May Calling'), a publication of the AJC from 1931

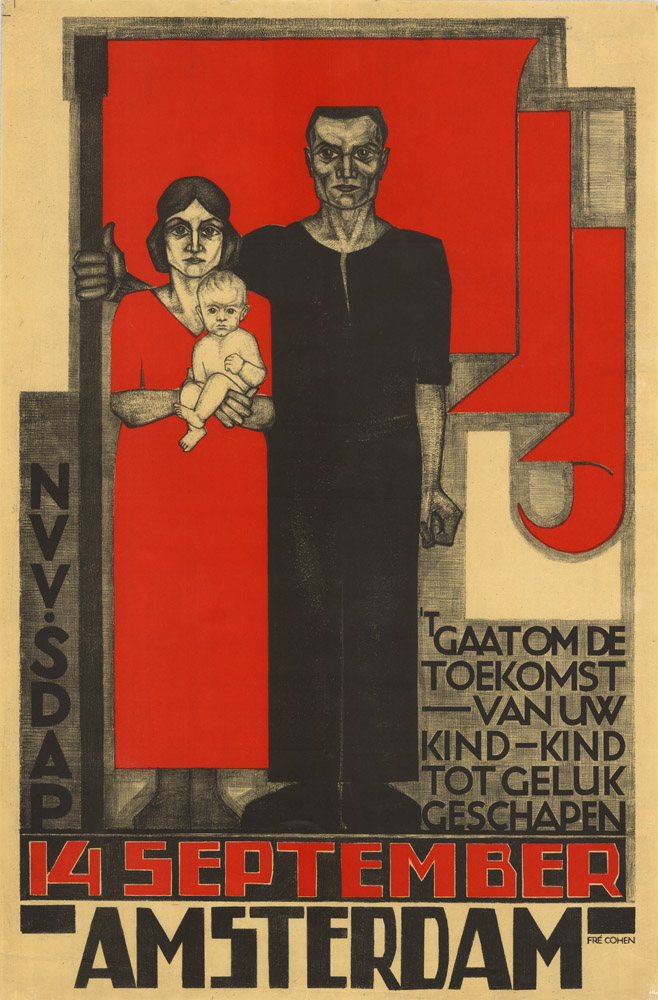
Poster for NVV and SDAP from 1930

As a child, Cohen already showed interest in drawing, and wanted to be a cartoonist. In 1921 she found herself in the wire and cable factory Draka, for which she designed ads. Later, she got a job at a socialist publishing firm, Ontwikkeling ("Development", tied to the Dutch Social Democratic Party, SDAP), where she did some design next to office work. Through her work for this publishing house she got access to the Social Democrat Party’s printing office, Vooruitgang ("Progress").

As a woman designer who was also well-versed in technical methods such as typesetting, Cohen was initially viewed with suspicion by her male colleagues. For most of the large number of brochures, magazines and other printed matter issued by the Socialist Party’s large Youth Organisation, AJC, Fré Cohen was responsible for designing the covers and the page layout.

Initially, as a self-educated artist, Cohen worked in her own personal and easily recognisable style, influenced by art deco and the strong lines and basic colors of De Stijl, used more for decoration than for function, comparable with the Amsterdam School of architecture. Starting in 1924, when she was 21, Cohen started taking part-time lessons at the Quellinusschool in Amsterdam. From 1927 to 1929, with a grant, she was able to follow lessons on a daily basis. She graduated with a Medal of Honor (the first ever in the Quellinusschool's history). After completing her education, her work became more varied and had a lighter tone.

From 1929 to 1932 Cohen was employed by the Stadsdrukkerij Amsterdam, the printing firm of the City of Amsterdam. Until 1941 she remained a freelance assistant and she was given the opportunity to design almost all the common printing for municipal services. She was very active and energetic and worked at a high rate. Also, she designed many bookbindings for various firms, like Querido, Wereldbibliotheek and De Arbeiderspers, often with an idealistic or socialistic signature. Her wrapper and binding designs often cover front, spine and back of the publication. Often, but not always, her signature "FC" may be found. She had a great influence on Dutch graphical design of the 1930s.

Cohen was a member of Nederlandsche Vereeniging voor Ambachts- en Nijverheidskunst (V.A.N.K.) the Dutch Association for Craft and Craft Art.

Cohen had a large output of rather varied printed matter, from window bills to bookplates, diplomas, illustrations, running headers, baby announcements and postcards. There are also some three-dimensional works such as boxes and scale models. She created folders and maps for Amsterdam Airport Schiphol, in a modernist style using gold, red and blue. Besides, she made paintings, portraits, drawings, woodcuts and linocuts.

== Later years ==
Under the Nazi occupation of the Netherlands that started in 1940, all Jews were in danger. Fre Cohen went into hiding in 1941 and stayed at friends' houses and remote farm houses consecutively in Amsterdam, Diemen, Rotterdam, Winterswijk and Borne. During that period she continued to work illegally, when she could. On 12 June 1943, she was arrested by the Germans in Borne. In haste, she took the pills she had hoarded for such an emergency. After two days in a coma, she died on 14 June 1943 at the age of 39 at a hospital in Hengelo. She is buried at the Jewish cemetery in Hengelo (Dennenbosweg 44).

Her sister managed to survive the war and afterwards put a simple tombstone on the unmarked grave in the Jewish cemetery in Hengelo, where also her father and brother are remembered, both murdered in the war. Part of Fré Cohen's work was destroyed by officers of the Sicherheitsdienst, who raided the places where she worked, but much has been preserved. The Stedelijk Museum Amsterdam houses a large collection of her graphic and original works.
