= Cornelis Rol =

Dutch graphic artist, lithographer, and illustrator

Cornelis Rol (2 September 1877 – 31 January 1963) was a Dutch graphic artist, painter, lithographer and illustrator. He was best known for his participation in sixteen Verkade albums.

Rol received his artistic education at the Tekenschool (Edam) and at the Rijksnormaalschool voor Teekenonderwijzers (Amsterdam). He later became a drawing teacher at the Applied Arts Quellinusschool Amsterdam.

He lived and worked in Edam, Amsterdam, The Hague until 1929 and then in Voorburg. Rol's work was included in the 1939 exhibition and sale Onze Kunst van Heden (Our Art of Today) at the Rijksmuseum in Amsterdam.

His son Henricus Rol also made illustrations for the Verkade albums.
