= Henricus Rol =

Dutch graphic artist

Henricus Rol (23 June 1906 – 29 August 1992) was a Dutch graphic artist who made paintings, watercolors and drawings. He was the son of graphic artist Cornelis Rol (1887–1963) and was an apprentice of his father.

Rol went to the Academy of Fine Arts in the Hague where he studied with Henk Meijer. He has a painting in the collection of the Rijksmuseum.

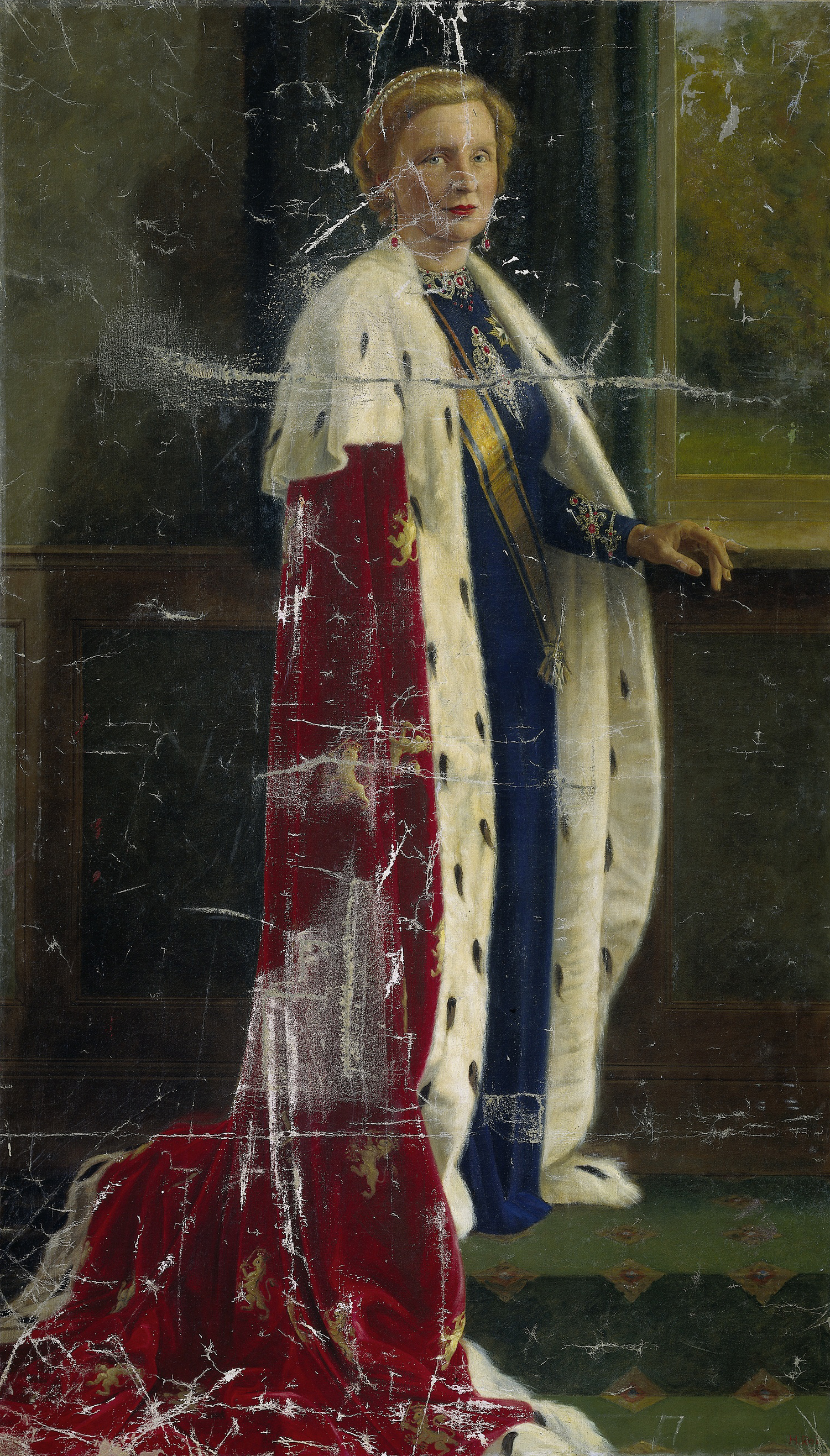
Queen Juliana of the Netherlands, in 1960
