= Quellinusschool =

Former art school in Amsterdam, Netherlands

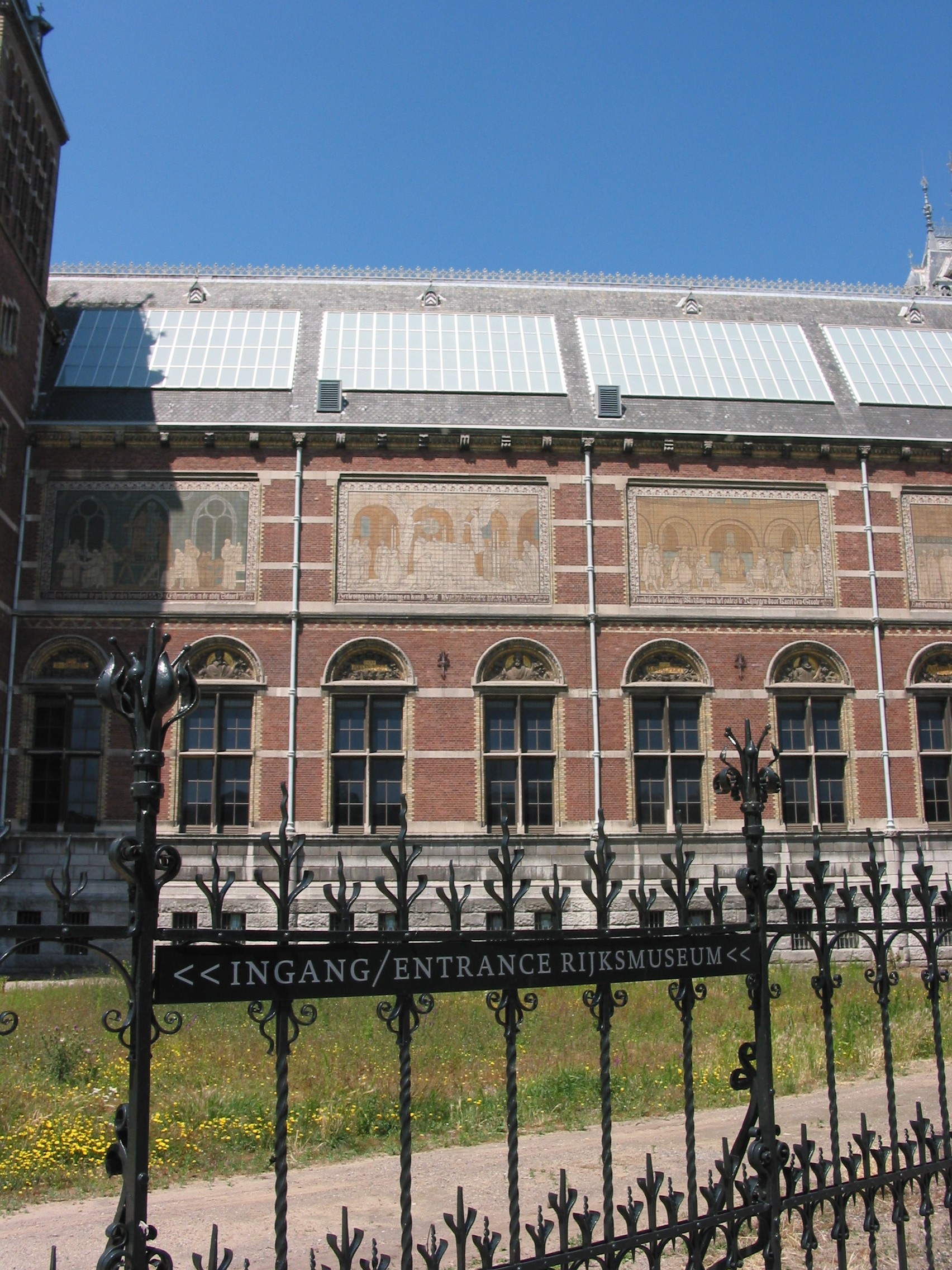
Tile panels and window reliefs on the west wall of the Rijksmuseum, Amsterdam, from Cuypers' "Quellinusschool" workshop

The Quellinusschool or Kunstnijverheidsschool Quellinus, was a school for sculptors in Amsterdam named after the Quellinus family of sculptors, founded in 1877.

It was founded as the Teekenschool voor Kunstambachten (Drawing school for art crafts) by Pierre Cuypers and Eduard Colinet in the workshop of the Rijksmuseum during the building of that institution, which itself contains several large sculptures and was intended to rival the Royal Palace of Amsterdam, which itself is full of works by the Quellinus family. The name was changed after the opening of the museum in 1885 to Kunstnijverheidsschool Quellinus, or simply Quellinusschool. In 1924 it merged with the Gerrit Rietveld Academie.

Currently Royal Dutch Antiquarian Society has an office in the school.

== List of directors and teachers ==
- Eduard Colinet (Eduard), founder and director from 1877
- Cuypers, P.J.H. (Pierre), co-founder
- Heukelom, J.B. (Jan Bertus), Drawing teacher
- Papenhuijzen, W. (Willem), Drawing teacher to 1921
- Laars, T. van der (Tiete), teacher ca. 1900
- Bourgonjon, L.F. (Louis), sculpting teacher who worked for 31 years there
- Wierink, B.W. (Ben), Drawing teacher from 1879
- Bossche, E. van den (Emile), assistant to Eduard Colinet
- Hove, B.J.W.M. van (Bart), director from 1902 to 1908
- Rol, C. (Cornelis), drawing teacher from 1903 to 1931
- Wal, H.A. van der (Hendrik Adriaan), drawing teacher from 1913 to 1948
- Jacobs, J.A. (Jacob Andries), teacher from 1916 to 1924
- Lauweriks, J.L.M. (Jan/Matthieu), director from 1917
- Nienhuis, L. (Bert), teacher ceramics from 1926
- Stolk, R.J.A. (Reijer), teacher from 1939
- Herder, D. (Dirk) de, teacher photography from 1940 to 1947
- Wildenhain, R.F. (Frans), teacher from 1947 to 1976
- Metz, A. (Lex), teacher graphic arts from 1949
- Gasteren, L.A. van (Louis), teacher from 1952 to 1982
- Elburg, J.G. (Jan), teacher spatial design from 1956 to 1963
- Crouwel, W.H. (Wim), ca. 1900
- Nijhoff, C.W., director from 1938
- Uri, J. (Jan), ca. 1947
- Couzijn, W. (Wessel), ca. 1968
- Kähler, G.M.D.C. (Greta)
- Zwollo, M. (Marinus), teacher of jewelry design from 1949 to 1968

== Some notable pupils ==
- Cris Agterberg (1883-1948)
- Fré Cohen (1903-1943)
- Aart van Dobbenburgh (1899-1988)
- Albert Hahn (1877-1918)
- Flip Hamers (1882-1966)
- Marinus Heijnes (1888-1963)
- Johan van Hell (1889-1952)
- J.B. Heukelom (1875-1965)
- Louise Kaiser (1891-1973)
- Albert Klijn (1895-1981)
- Pieter Kuhn (1910-1966)
- Joseph Mendes da Costa (1863–1939)
- Bert Nienhuis (1873-1960)
- J.J.P. Oud (1890-1963)
- Bertus Sondaar (1904-1984)
- André Vlaanderen (1881-1955)
- Herman Walenkamp (1871-1933)
- Marinus Zwollo (1903-1983)
