= Eduard Colinet =

Belgian sculptor (1844–1890)

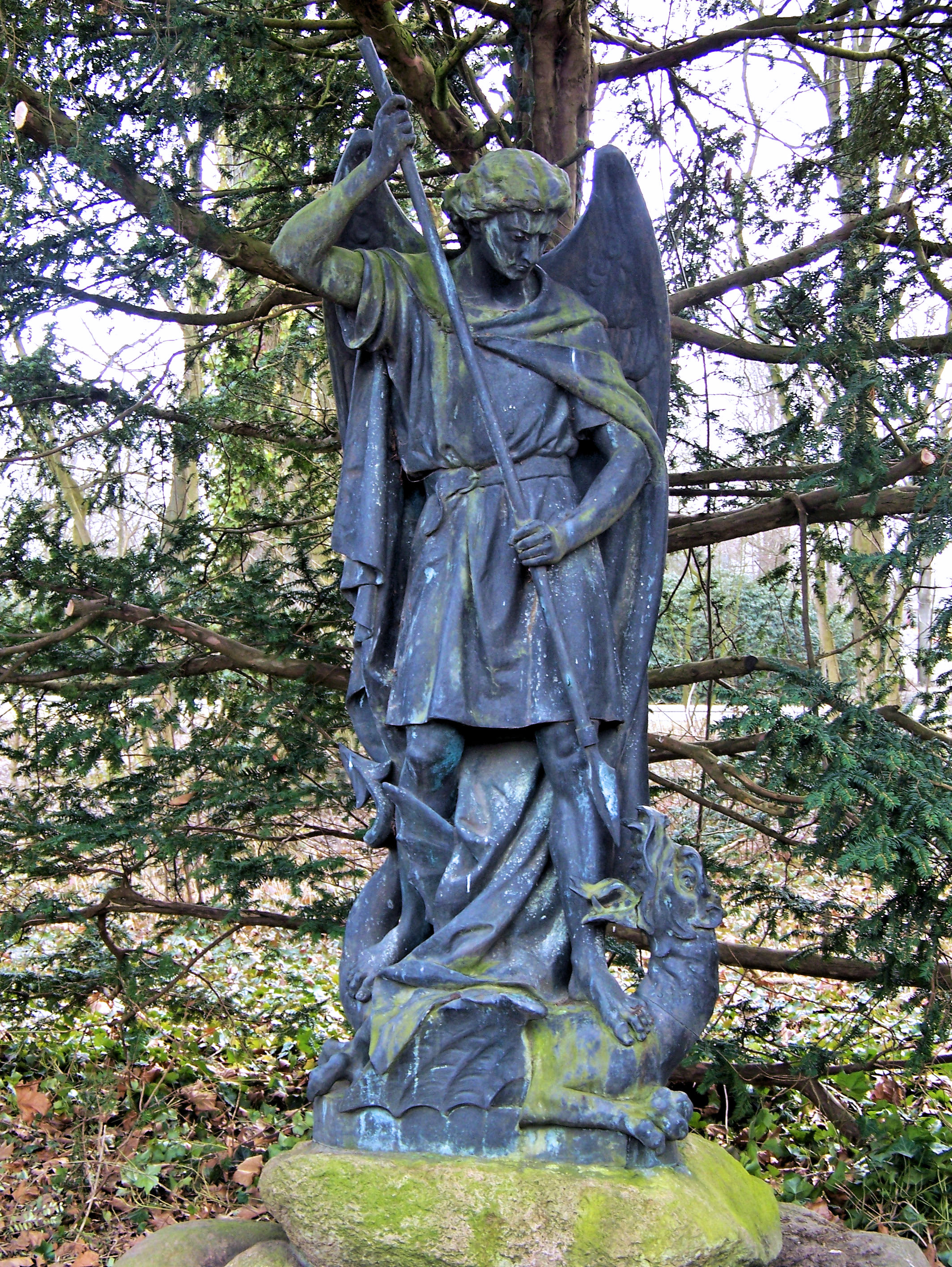
St Michel, terrassant le Dragon (1883), Stadspark of Groningen

Emmanuel Constant Edouard (or Eduard) Colinet (12 December 1844 – 5 January 1890) was a Belgian sculptor.

== Life and work ==
In 1874 and 1875, Colinet wrote the booklet Recueil Des Restes De Notre Art National - Verzameling der Overblijfsels onzer Nationale Kunst der XIste tot de XVIIIde Eeuw, which was regarded as a standard work on the period it describes. In 1877, he left his hometown of Brussels and became special supervisor under Pierre Cuypers during the construction of the Rijksmuseum in Amsterdam. In 1878, he oversaw Cuypers' restoration of the City Hall facade. Together with Cuypers he founded the Quellinusschool in Amsterdam. Colinet was also the first director of this school. In 1880, together with Cuypers and F. Stoltzenberg, he wrote Album van Ornamenten en Stijlproeven uit de verschillende Tijdperken der Bouwkunst ("Album of Ornaments and Style Tests from the Different Eras of Architecture").

== Works ==
=== Sculptures ===
- Tomb Monument of Jan Albregt (1880) on De Nieuwe Ooster in Amsterdam, after a design by Charles Rochussen
- Gable stone of Pieter Corneliszoon Hooft placed above the latter's former house (1881), Keizersgracht, Amsterdam
- St Michel, terrassant le Dragon (1883). Made for Willem Albert Scholten, it has been in the Stadspark of Groningen since 1931.
- Statue of Mary on the facade of the town hall in Nijmegen. It was destroyed in World War II and replaced in 1953 by a statue of Albert Termote.

=== Publications ===
- Verzameling der overblijfsels onzer nationale kunst der XIste tot de XVIIIde eeuw / E. Colinet; E. Loran. Liège: Claesen, vol.1 (1873) nr. 1-vol.3 (1876) nr. 17/18.
- Kunstvoorwerpen uit vroegere eeuwen / Éd. Colinet en A.D. de Vries Azn. Amsterdam: Wegner en Mattu, 1877. Catalog of the Exhibition of Applied Arts in Amsterdam, 1877.
- Catalogus der tentoonstelling van Kunstvoorwerpen in vroegere eeuwen uit edele metalen vervaardigd, gehouden door de maatschappĳ Arti et Amicitiae / samengest. by N. de Roever, A.D. de Vries and Ed. Colinet. Amsterdam: Van Munster, 1880. p. 306
- Album van ornamenten en andere stylproeven uit de verschillende tĳdperken der bouwkunst - Album d'ornaments et autres détails des diverses époques de l'architecture, Amsterdam: Frederik Muller, 1880
