= Alida Sophia Hendriks =

Dutch artist

- Born: 3 June 1901; The Hague, Netherlands
- Died: 15 August 1984 (aged 83); The Hague, Netherlands
- Known for: Painting

Alida Sophia Hendriks (1901–1984) was a Dutch painter.

== Biography ==
Hendriks was born on 3 June 1901 in The Hague. She studied with Willem van den Berg (schilder) and Cornelis Mension. She was a member of the Pulchri Studio. Hendriks's work was included in the 1939 exhibition and sale Onze Kunst van Heden (Our Art of Today) at the Rijksmuseum in Amsterdam.

Hendriks died on 15 August 1984 in The Hague.
