= Cornelis Kloos =

Dutch painter

- Born: 11 November 1895; Rotterdam, Netherlands
- Died: 8 April 1976 (aged 80); The Hague, Netherlands
- Occupation: Painter
- Website: corneliskloos.com

Cornelis Kloos (11 November 1895 – 8 April 1976) was a Dutch painter. His work was part of the art competitions at the 1928 Summer Olympics, the 1932 Summer Olympics, and the 1936 Summer Olympics. Kloos' work was included in the 1939 exhibition and sale Onze Kunst van Heden (Our Art of Today) at the Rijksmuseum in Amsterdam.
