= Karin Mader =

Dutch artist

- Born: Katharina Margareta Mader; 27 February 1910; Bayreuth, Germany
- Died: 11 July 1973 (aged 63); Amstelveen, Netherlands
- Other names: Karin Zuidema-Mader
- Known for: Painting
- Spouse: S. J. Zuidema

Katharina "Karin" Margareta Mader (1910–1973) was a Dutch artist known for her floral paintings.

== Biography ==
Mader was born on 27 February 1910 in Bayreuth, Germany. She was a student of Josef Verheijen. Her work was included in the 1939 exhibition and sale Onze Kunst van Heden (Our Art of Today) at the Rijksmuseum in Amsterdam. She was a member of the Federatie van Verenigingen van Beroeps Beeldende Kunstenaars (Federation of Associations of Professional Visual Artists) in Amsterdam. Mader died on 11 July 1973 in Amstelveen.
