= Jan Goedhart =

Dutch painter

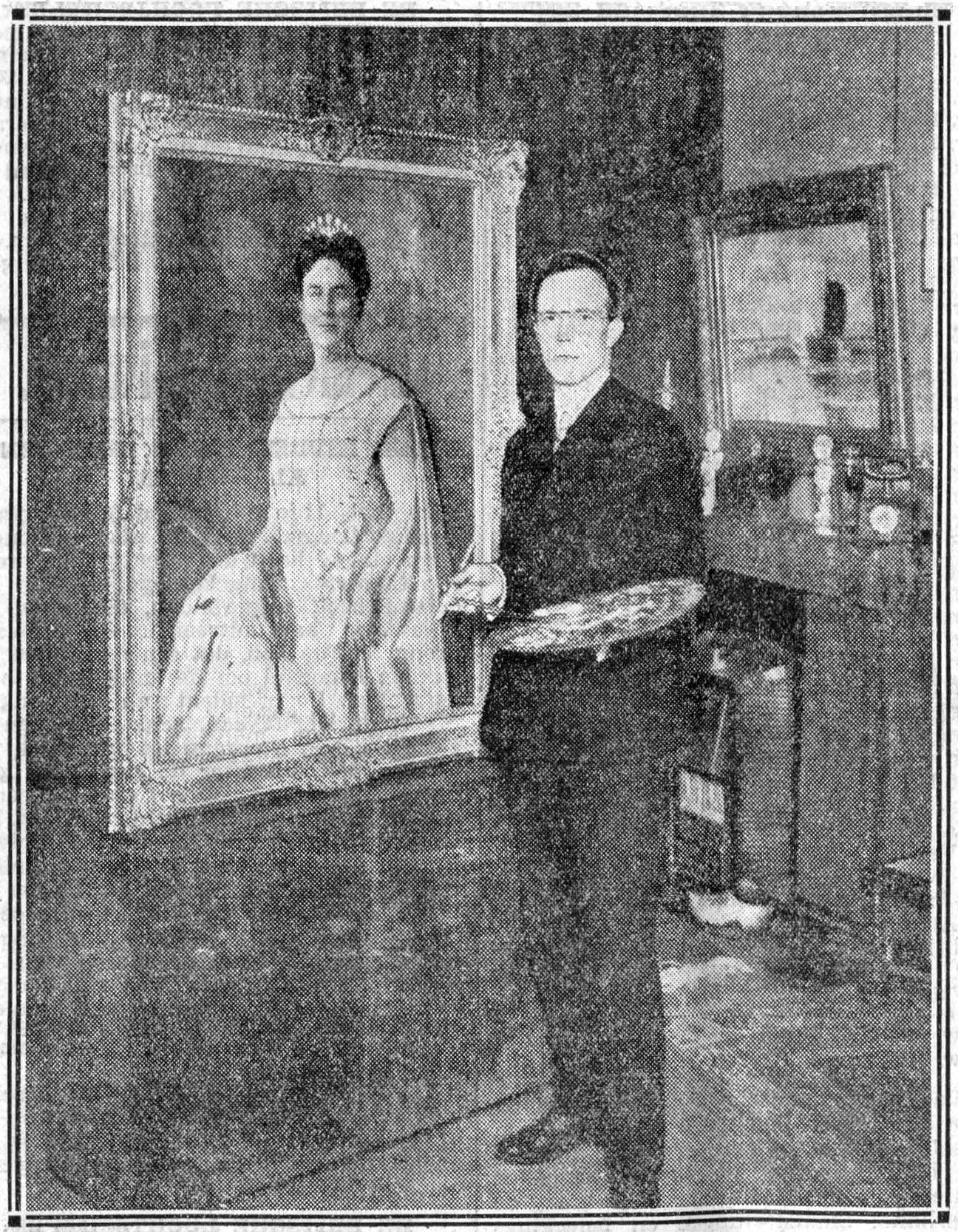
- J.A.C. Goedhart with portrait of Queen Wilhelmina commissioned by city of Hulst, 1930
- Born: 28 June 1893; Silau Toewa, Dutch East Indies
- Died: 16 September 1975 (aged 82); Rijswijk, Netherlands
- Occupation: Painter

Jan Goedhart (28 June 1893 – 16 September 1975) was a Dutch painter. He lived and worked in Amsterdam, The Hague, and Tübingen, and spent his last 25 years in Rijswijk, near The Hague.

Goedhart's work was featured in the art competitions at the 1936 Summer Olympics and the 1948 Summer Olympics. His work was also included in the 1939 exhibition and sale Onze Kunst van Heden (Our Art of Today) at the Rijksmuseum in Amsterdam.
