= Julia Giesberts =

Dutch artist

- Born: 9 May 1893; Den Helder, Netherlands
- Died: 30 October 1983 (aged 90); Haarlem, Netherlands
- Known for: Painting

Julia Giesberts or Wilhelmina Julia Giesberts (1893-1983) was a Dutch painter and printmaker.

== Biography ==
Giesberts was born on 9 May 1893 in Amsterdam. She studied at the Rijksakademie van beeldende kunsten (State Academy of Fine Arts). She studied with Carel Dake, Klaas van Leeuwen, Samuel Jessurun de Mesquita, and Nicolaas van der Waay. Her work was included in the 1939 exhibition and sale Onze Kunst van Heden (Our Art of Today) at the Rijksmuseum in Amsterdam.

Giesberts died on 30 October 1983 in Haarlem.
