= Jemmy van Hoboken =

Dutch artist (1900–1962)

- Born: Jacoba van Hoboken; 30 August 1900; The Hague, Netherlands
- Died: 30 July 1962 (aged 61); Wageningen, Netherlands
- Other names: J. van de Guchte-van Hoboken
- Known for: Painting
- Spouse: Jacob van Guchte

Jacoba "Jemmy" van Hoboken (1900-1962) was a Dutch painter.

== Biography ==
Hoboken was born on 30 August 1900 in The Hague. She studied at the Haags Tekeninstituut Bik en Vaandrager. She studied with Erwin Knirr, Han van Meegeren, and Walter Thor. She was a member of the Kunstenaarsvereniging Laren-Blaricum. Hoboken's work was included in the 1939 exhibition and sale Onze Kunst van Heden (Our Art of Today) at the Rijksmuseum in Amsterdam.

Hoboken died on 22 February 1962 in Wageningen.
