= Eduard Hellendoorn =

Dutch artist

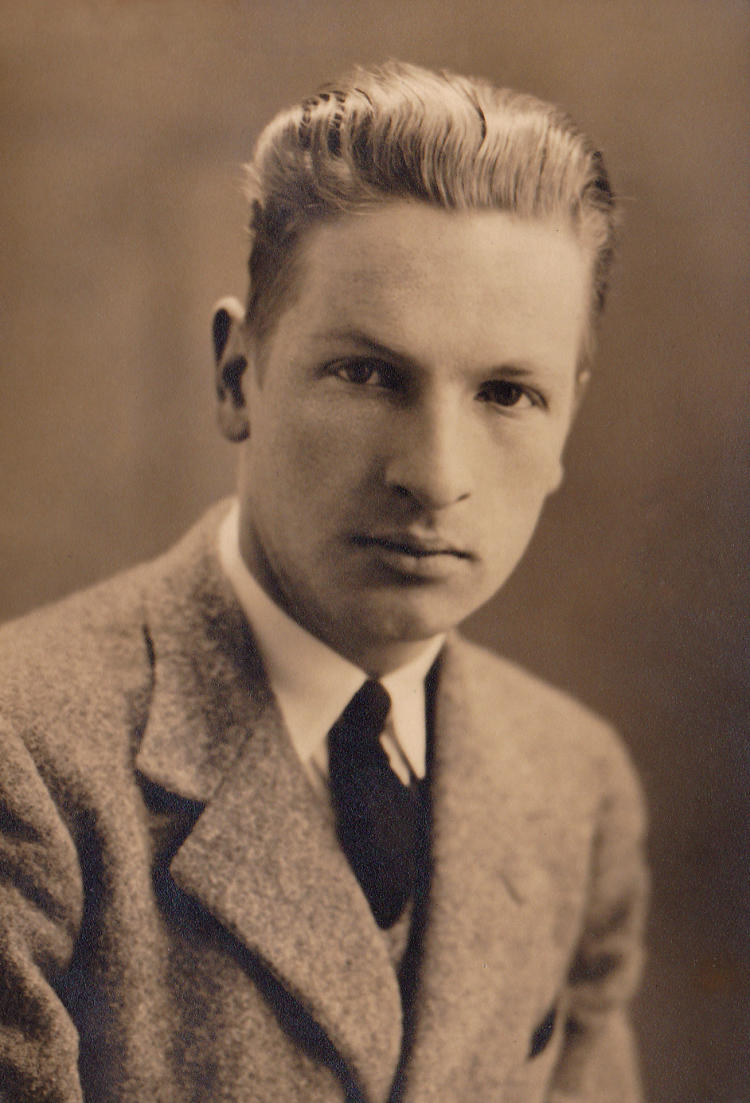
- Hellendoorn (1935)
- Born: Eduard Carel Frederik Hellendoorn; 29 November 1912; Amsterdam, Netherlands
- Died: 13 March 1941 (aged 28); Waalsdorpervlakte, Netherlands
- Other names: Ward Hellendoorn
- Known for: Painting, Dutch resistance fighter
- Spouse: Johanna Maria Drayton Lee (m. 1931; div. 1939)
- Website: eduardhellendoorn.nl

Eduard Carel Frederik Hellendoorn (29 November 1912 – 13 March 1941) was a painter and Dutch resistance fighter.

== Biography ==
Hellendoorn was born on 29 November 1912 in Amsterdam. He studied the Koninklijke Academie van Beeldende Kunsten (Den Haag) (Royal Academy of Art, The Hague). In 1931 Hellendoorn married Johanna Maria Drayton Lee with whom he had three children. The couple divorced in 1939. Hellendoorn's work was included in the 1939 exhibition and sale Onze Kunst van Heden (Our Art of Today) at the Rijksmuseum in Amsterdam.

In 1940 Hellendoorn joined the communist artists' resistance. In 1941 he took part in the Februaristaking February strike, a protest against the persecution of Dutch Jews. He was subsequently arrested and imprisoned in the Oranjehotel in Scheveningen.

Hellendoorn was executed on 13 March 1941 at Waalsdorpervlakte.

== Gallery ==
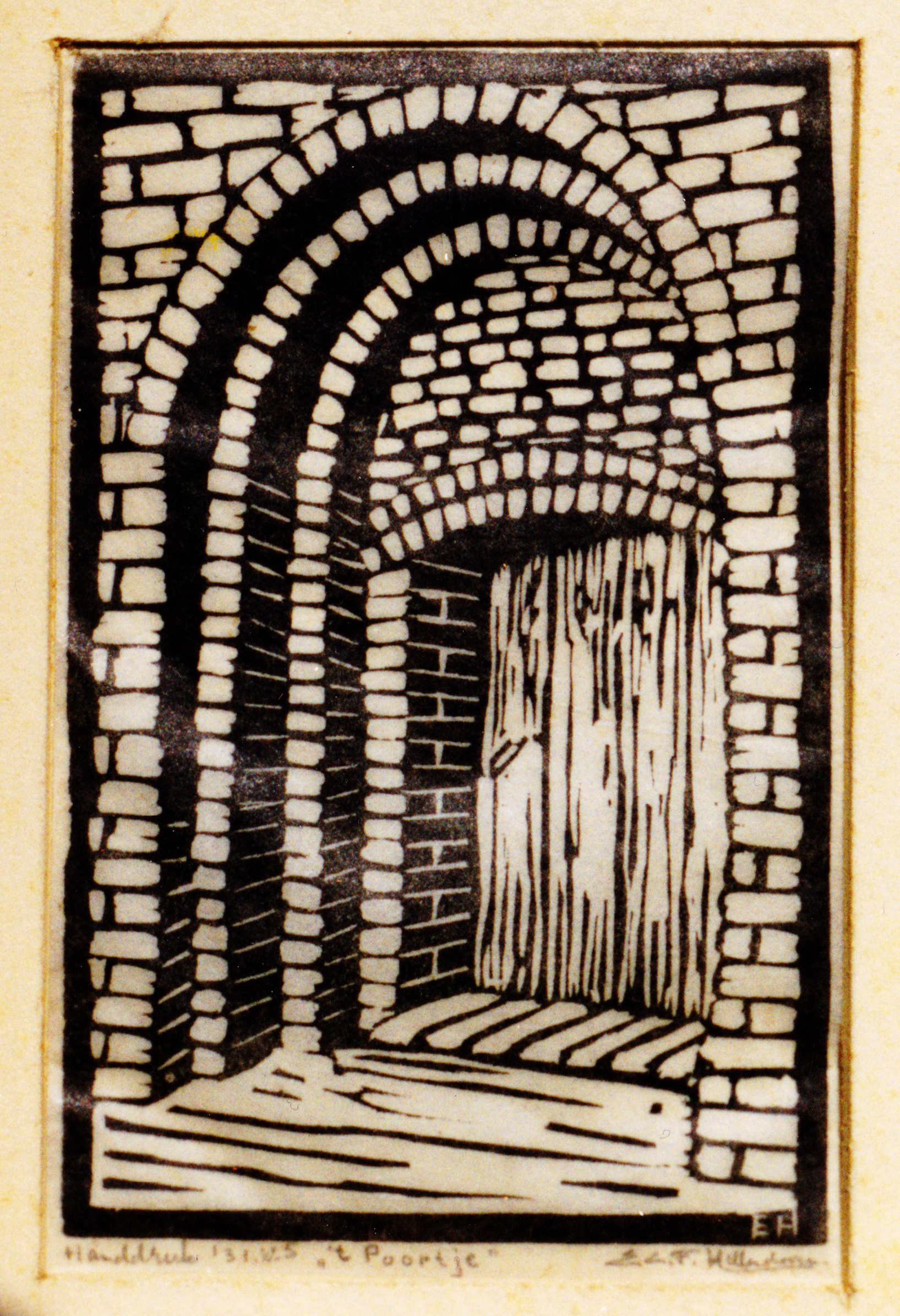
Church, Garderen (1939)

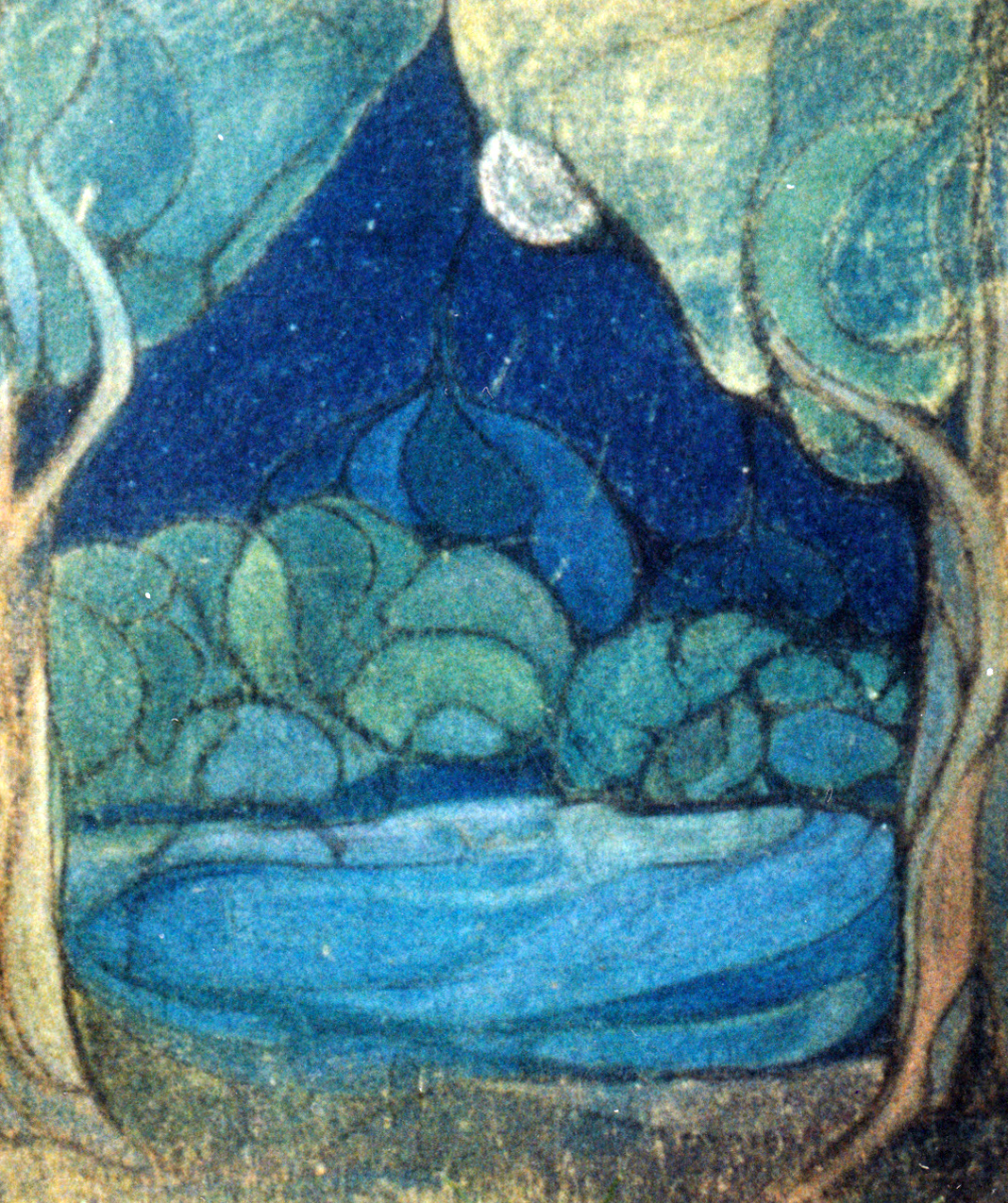
Dream (1922)
