= Alberta Johanna Meijer-Smetz =

Dutch artist

- Born: Alberta Johanna Smetz; 12 August 1893; Nieuwer-Amstel, Netherlands
- Died: 16 August 1953 (aged 60); Blaricum, Netherlands
- Known for: Painting
- Spouse: Johan Meijer

Alberta Johanna Meijer-Smetz (1893-1953) was a Dutch painter.

== Biography ==
Meijer-Smetz née Smetz was born on 12 August 1893 in Nieuwer-Amstel. She studied at the Rijksakademie van beeldende kunsten (State Academy of Fine Arts) in Amsterdam. Her teachers included Adrianus Martinus De Groot, Richard Roland Holst, and Johan Meijer (1885-1970), whom she married.

In 1920 she won the Legaat Vrouwe Vigelius (Lady Vigelius Prize). Her work was included in the 1939 exhibition and sale Onze Kunst van Heden (Our Art of Today) at the Rijksmuseum in Amsterdam. She was a member of the Kunstenaarsvereniging Laren-Blaricum (Artists association Laren-Blaricum).

Meijer-Smetz died on 16 August 1953 in Blaricum.
