= Clara Adriana van der Werff =

Dutch artist

- Born: 12 August 1895; Almelo, Netherlands
- Died: 13 September 1962 (aged 67); Bussum, Netherlands
- Other names: Clara van der Kreek-van der Werff
- Known for: Painting
- Spouse: Nicolaas van der Kreek

Clara Adriana van der Werff (12 August 1895 in Almelo – 13 September 1965 in Bussum) was a Dutch artist.

She attended the Rijksakademie van beeldende kunsten (State Academy of Fine Arts). Her teachers included Johannes Hendricus Jurres and Nicolaas van der Waay. In 1923 she married the Dutch sculptor Nicolaas van der Kreek (1896–1967). Her work was included in the 1939 exhibition and sale Onze Kunst van Heden (Our Art of Today) at the Rijksmuseum in Amsterdam. She was a member of the Vereniging van Beeldende Kunstenaars (Association of Visual Artists) in the area of Naarden-Bussum.

van der Werff died on 13 September 1965 in Bussum.
