= Gra Rueb =

Dutch sculptor

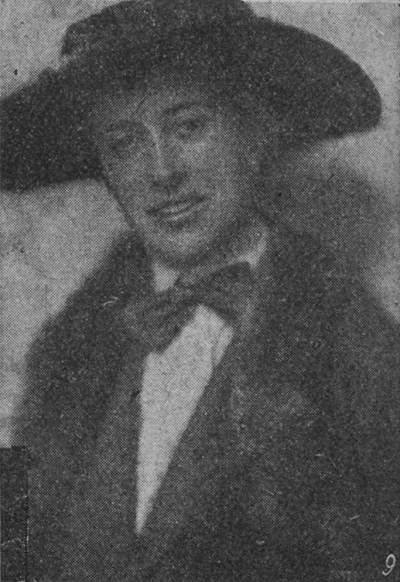
- Rueb in 1919
- Born: 4 September 1885; Breda, Netherlands
- Died: 26 December 1972 (aged 87); The Hague, Netherlands
- Occupation: Sculptor

Gra Rueb (Dutch: [ˈɣraː ˈryp]; 4 September 1885 – 26 December 1972) was a Dutch sculptor. Her work was part of the sculpture event in the art competition at the 1928 Summer Olympics. Rueb's work was included in the 1939 exhibition and sale Onze Kunst van Heden (Our Art of Today) at the Rijksmuseum in Amsterdam.
