= Cees Bolding =

Dutch painter (1897–1979)

- Born: 7 January 1897; Wormerveer, Netherlands
- Died: 1 November 1979 (aged 82); The Hague, Netherlands
- Occupation: Painter

Cornelis "Cees" Bolding (7 January 1897 – 1 November 1979) was a Dutch painter. He attended Rijksschool voor Kunstnijverheid Amsterdam (National School for Applied Arts Amsterdam) and the Rijksakademie van beeldende kunsten. He taught at Rijksnormaalschool voor Teekenonderwijzers (National Normal School for Drawing Teachers). His work was part of the painting event in the art competition at the 1928 Summer Olympics. Bolding's work was included in the 1939 exhibition and sale Onze Kunst van Heden (Our Art of Today) at the Rijksmuseum in Amsterdam.
