= Henriëtte Johanna Reuchlin-Lucardie =

Dutch artist

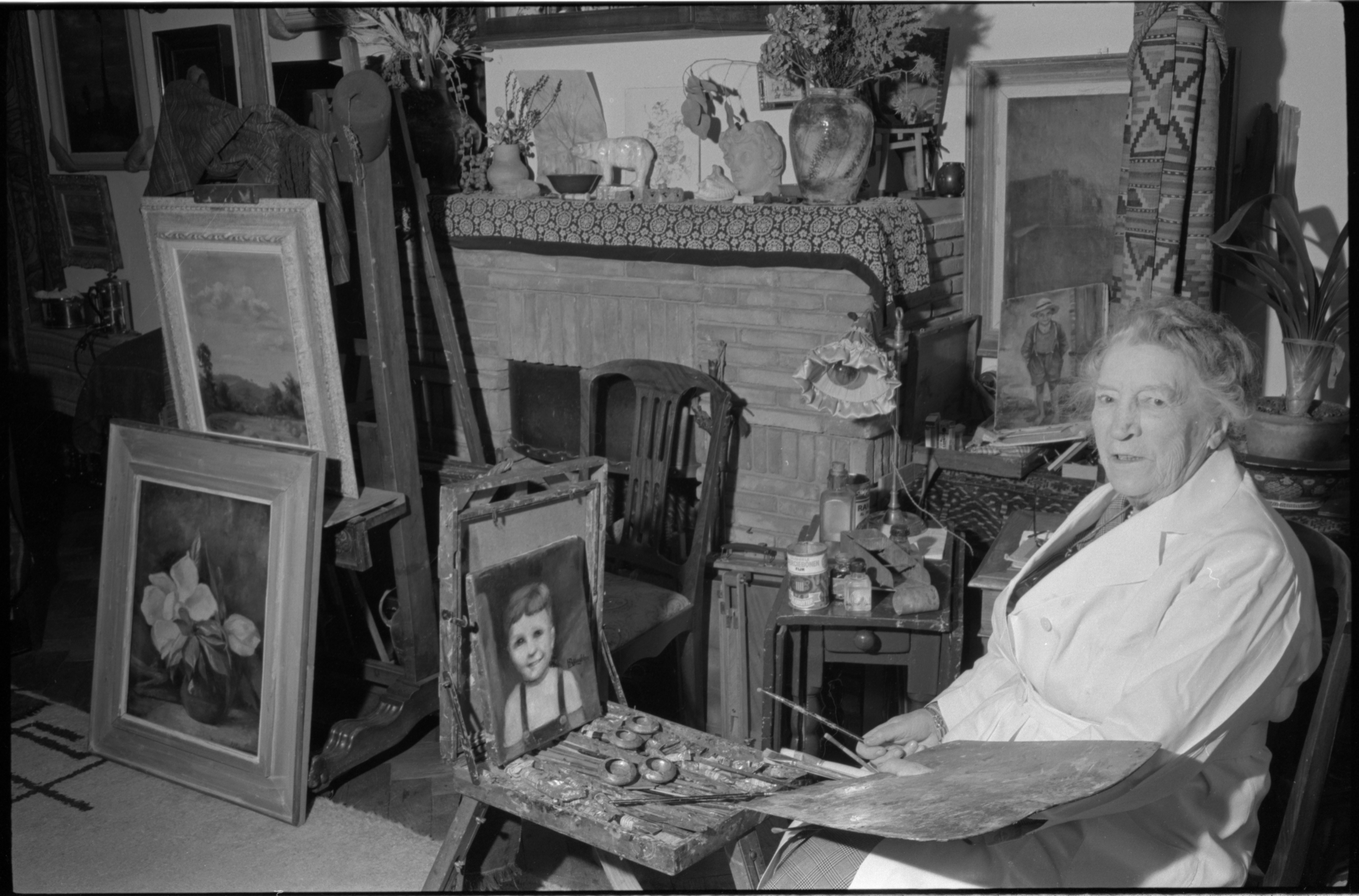
- Henriëtte Reuchlin-Lucardie in her studio, 1963
- Born: Henriëtte Johanna Lucardie; 28 April 1877; Rotterdam, Netherlands
- Died: 22 September 1970 (aged 93); Rotterdam, Netherlands
- Known for: Painting
- Spouse: jhr. M. Reuchlin

Henriëtte Johanna Reuchlin-Lucardie (1877-1970) was a Dutch painter.

== Biography ==
Reuchlin-Lucardie née Lucardie was born on 28 April 1877 in Rotterdam. She studied at the Willem de Kooning Academy in Rotterdam. Her teachers included Antoon Derkzen van Angeren, Alexander van Maasdijk, Simon Moulijn, and Ferdinand Oldewelt.

She exhibited with De Onafhankelijken (The Independents) artists group from 1919 through 1963. In 1930 she had a solo exhibition at the Stedelijk Museum Amsterdam. In 1950 she had another solo exhibition at the Museum Het huis van Looy in Haarlem.

Her work was included in the 1939 exhibition and sale Onze Kunst van Heden (Our Art of Today) at the Rijksmuseum in Amsterdam. She was a member of the Arti et Amicitiae, Kunstenaarsvereniging Sint Lucas, and the Rotterdamsche Kunstenaars-Sociëteit.

Reuchlin-Lucardie died on 22 September 1970 in Rotterdam. Her work is in the Centraal Museum, Utrecht.
