= Onze Kunst van Heden =

Exhibition in the Rijkmuseum, 1939–1940

- Date: 1939 to 1940
- Location: Rijksmuseum, Amsterdam, the Netherlands

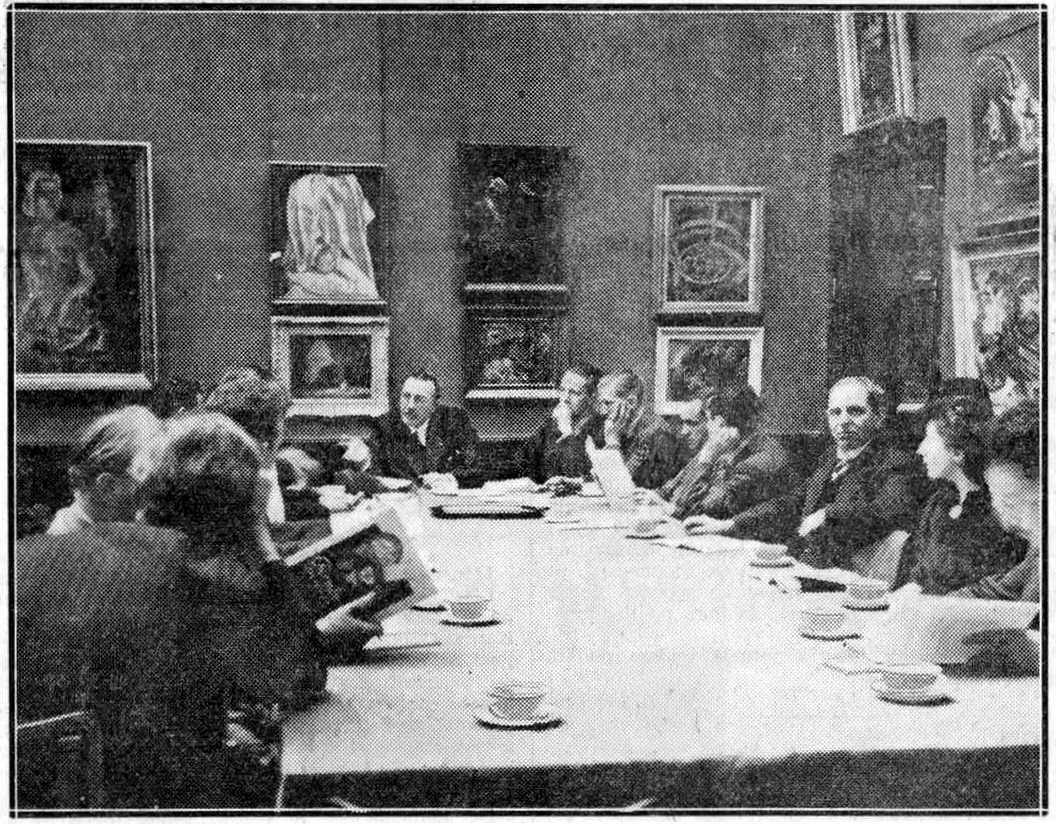
F. Schmidt Degener heads press conference at Onze Kunst van Heden expo.

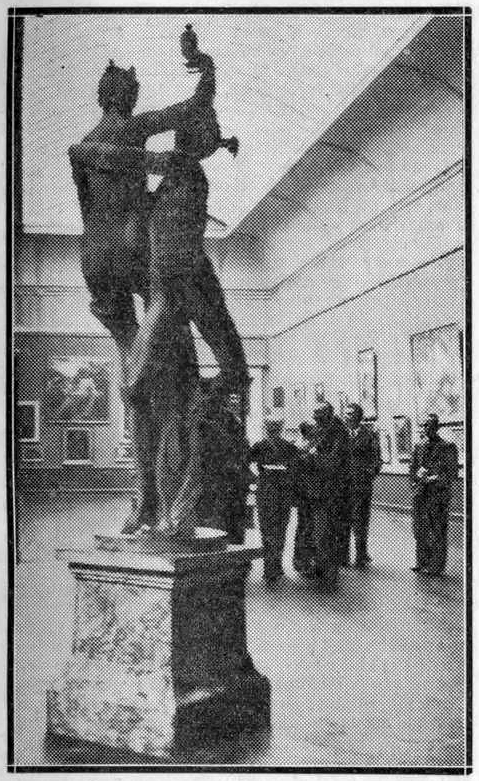
F. Schmidt Degener guides the press in the expo "Onze Kunst van Heden", 1939

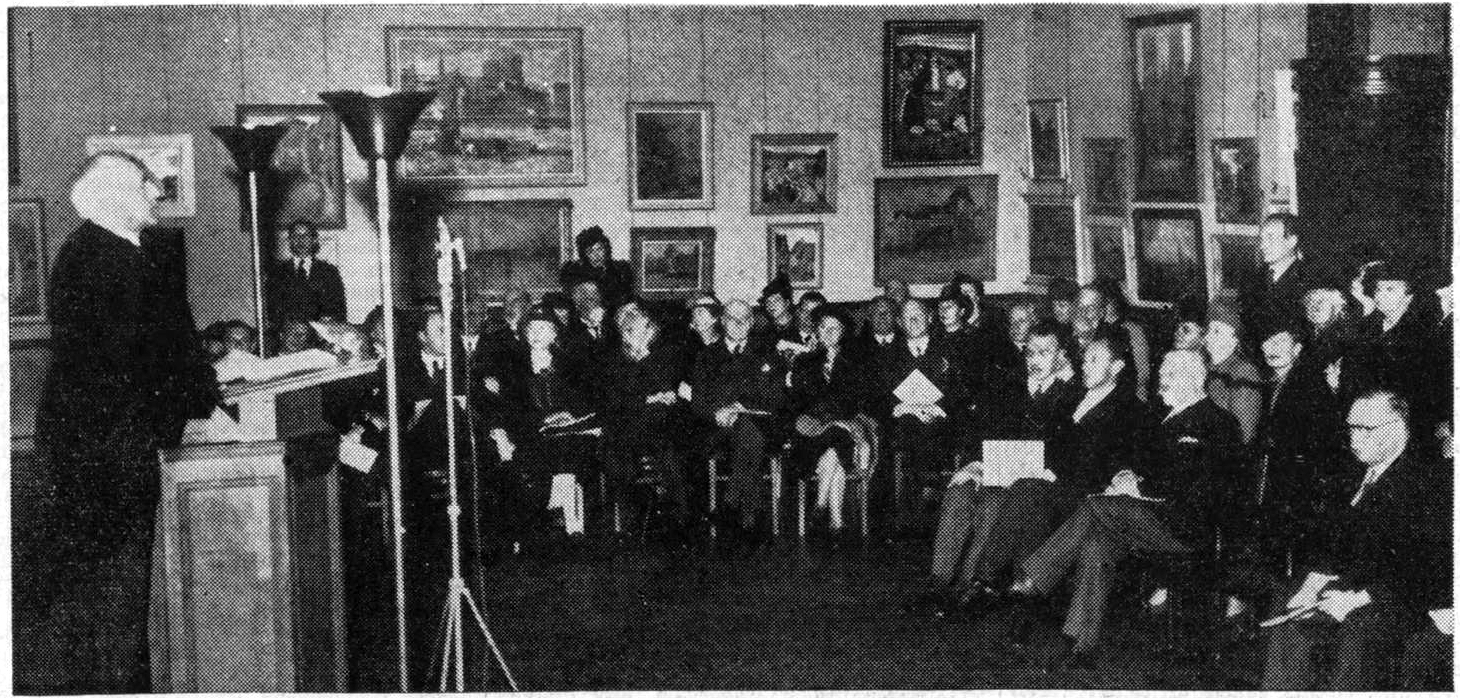
Opening by Minister Gerrit Bolkestein of expo Onze Kunst van Heden, 1939

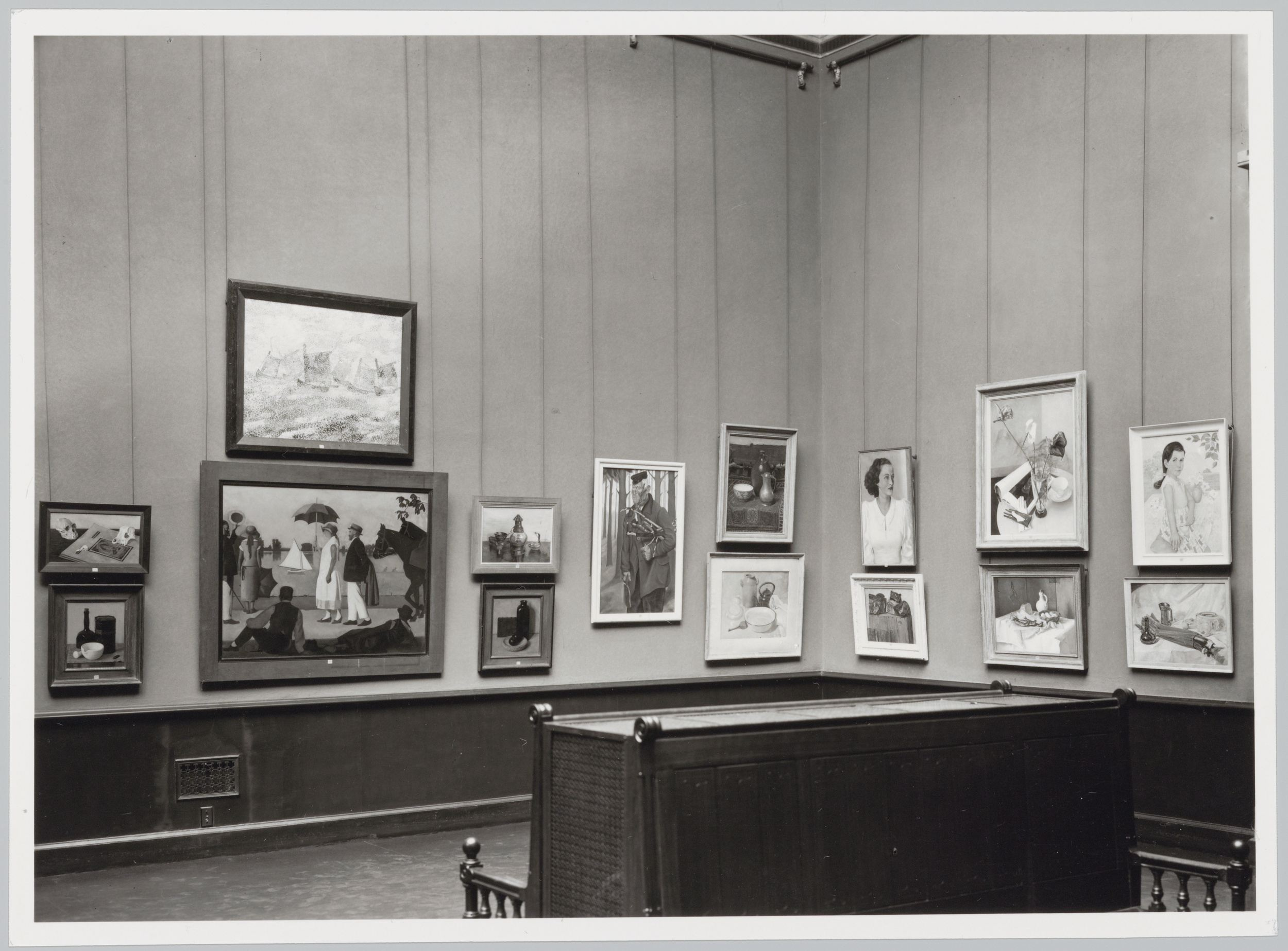
Arrangement of the exhibition Onze kunst van heden 1939-1940.

Onze Kunst van Heden (Contemporary Artists/Our Art of Today) was an exhibition held in the winter of 1939 through 1940 at the Rijksmuseum in Amsterdam. Due to the threat of invasion in the years leading up to World War II, the Netherlands' government stored many items from the Rijksmuseum's permanent collection. The resulting empty gallery space was utilized by contemporary Dutch artists to exhibit and sell their art. It was organized by the director of the Rijksmuseum Frederik Schmidt Degener. The show was open to all artists, with each artist allowed to enter four pieces. 902 artists exhibited 3,200 works of art in 74 rooms and cabinets of the Rijksmuseum.

„De kunstenaar kan in tijden van maatschappelijke benauwenis weinig positiefs doen om rampen af te wenden, maar wel kan hij door mede te helpen nationale uitingen op het eigenaardigst naar voren te brengen het gemeenschapsbesef versterken. Wanneer de belangstelling van het publiek uitgaat naar deze manifestatie, die in zulk een omvang in Holland nog niet gezien is, dan zal menige kunstenaar zich op zijn beurt gesterkt voelen".

— Frederik Schmidt Degener, 1939, from the catalog of Onze Kunst van Heden

"The artist can do little positive in times of social distress to avert disasters, but he can, by helping to bring out national expressions in the most idiosyncratic way, strengthen the sense of community. When the public is interested in this event, which has not yet been seen to such an extent in Holland, many artists will feel strengthened in turn."

— translation

== Artists exhibited at Onze Kunst van Heden ==
Artists included in the exhibition as listed in ARTindex Lexicon Online

A

- Fik Abbing
- Jean Adams (Johann Hubert Adams)
- Marinus Adamse
- Christiaan Johannes Addicks
- Johan P. Aerts
- Henk Albers
- Paul van Alff
- Gerrit Alozerij
- Jan Altink
- Nans Amesz
- Thérèse Ansingh
- Albert Arens
- Paul Arntzenius

B

- Nico Baak
- Pieter Willem van Baarsel
- Frans Backmund
- Reinier Sybrand Bakels
- Nel Bakema
- Jan Bakker
- Teun Bakker
- Jan Bander (Jan Cornelis Bander)
- Léonie Bander - Lutomirski
- Bets Bayens - Polak
- Isabella van Beeck Calkoen
- Chris Beekman
- Bella van Beek-Stroeve
- Theo Beerendonk
- Hans Beers
- Di Behrens
- Chris Bekker Jr.
- Hubert Bekman
- Truus Pannekoek-van Bemmel
- Freek van den Berg
- Pieter den Besten
- Louise Beyerman
- Jo Bezaan
- Herman Bieling
- Marinus Bies
- Leonora van Bijsterveld
- Han Bijvoet
- Marinus Blanke
- Tjieke Bleckmann
- Wilhelm Christiaan Constant Bleckmann
- Laurens Bleeker
- Miek Bloemen
- M.C. Boas - Zélander
- Felicien Bobeldijk
- Jac Bodaan
- Nelly Bodenheim
- W.F. Boekstal
- Kees Boendermaker
- Estella den Boer
- Wilhelmus de Boer
- Willy Boers
- Herman Bogman (jr.)
- Piet Böhncke
- Rie de Balbian Verster-Bolderhey
- Cees Bolding
- Han Bolte
- Claire Bonebakker
- Berend Bongers
- Jantjen Bontkes
- Herman van den Boogaard
- Alex Boom (Karel Alexander August Jan Boom)
- Jan Boon
- Henri Frédéric Boot
- Han Boskamp
- Wim Bosma
- Jaap Bouhuijs (Jaap Bouhuys)
- Jo Bouman
- Gerard Bourgonjon
- Gesina Bouvé
- G.E. Bouwmeester
- Anna Maria Braakensiek-Dekker
- Leo Braat
- Maaike Braat-Rolvink
- Chiel Brandenburg
- Bert Brante
- Dolf Breetveld
- Geraldo Abraham Brender à Brandis
- Johan Briedé
- E.T. van Briel
- Elga Broeckman (Elga Eymer)
- Adriënne Broeckman-Klinkhamer
- L.M. Broeckman - van Zijdveld
- Anne Marinus Broeckman
- Hetty Broedelet - Henkes
- Frederika Henriëtte Broeksmit
- Edmée Broers
- Louis Bron
- Dick Broos
- Fred Brouwer
- I.A. Brouwer
- Robert Ives Browne
- Rudolf de Bruyn Ouboter
- Annie Bruin
- Artur Bryks
- Johan Buning
- M.A.H. van der Burg
- Dirk Bus
- Johan Busé
- Meindert Butter

C

- Mies Callenfels-Carsten
- Louis Cardinaals
- Nico Cevat
- Jacques Chapchal
- Paul Citroen
- Joop Coenders
- Pie Coenen
- Mozes Cohen
- Willem van der Colk
- Joan Collette
- Arnout Colnot
- Ko Cossaar
- Cornelis Cox
- Marie Cremers
- Jos Croin

D

- Henri van Daalhoff
- Kreel Daamen
- Max van Dam
- Wim van Dam
- Lucie van Dam van Isselt
- J.J. Damme
- Maurits van Dantzig
- Rachel van Dantzig
- Arnold Davids
- Mies Deinum
- Paul Determeyer
- Alex Dieperink
- H.B. Dieperink Jzn.
- Henri Dievenbach
- W.J. Dijk
- Johan Dijkstra (kunstenaar)
- Waalko Dingemans
- Maria Helena Disselhoff
- Marinus Dittlinger
- Jacobus Doeser
- Elise Dom
- Jan Dona
- Jan Adriaan Donker Duyvis,
- Claudine Doorman
- Tini van Doornik
- Jaap Dooijewaard
- Willem Dooyewaard
- Leopold Herman Daniël van Dorp
- Willem van Dort Sr.
- Rein Draijer
- Arend Jan van Driesten
- Gerard Drost
- Gerrit van Duffelen
- Jacob van Duijne
- Erasmus Herman van Dulmen Krumpelman
- W.F. Dupont
- Debora Duyvis
- Lize Duyvis

E

- Guillaume Eberhard
- Geurt van Eck
- Willem van Eck
- Nicolas Eekman
- Stien Eelsingh
- Henri Eernink
- Henk van Eeuwijk sr
- Piet van Egmond
- Antje Egter van Wissekerke
- P.B.M. van den Eijnde
- Willem Eitjes
- Dick Elffers
- Rieks Elings
- Johannes Elsinga
- Fred Engel
- Jop van Epen
- Jac Eriks
- Johan Eshuis
- Bernard Essers
- Henk Etienne
- Frans Everbag
- Jan Everts
- Dirk den Exter
- Charles Eyck
- Irma van Eysinga

F

- Johann Faber
- Marie Madeleine De Famars Testas
- Barend Ferwerda
- Albert Fiks
- Dirk Filarski
- Willy Fleur
- Phocas Fokkens
- Adriana Fontein
- Anton Fortuin
- Jan Franken
- Marianne Franken
- Jan Franken Pzn.
- Roel Frankot
- Gerrit Frederiks
- Abraham Fresco
- Albert Funke Küpper

G

- Salomon Garf
- Coenraad Garms
- Jan van Geem
- Dirk van Gelder
- Hendrika van Gelder
- Rebecca van Gelder
- Wijnand Geraedts
- Pieter Geraedts
- Roelf Gerbrands
- Ed Gerdes
- Huub Gerretsen
- Ger Gerrits
- C. Gerritsen
- Jan Jacob Gerstel
- Willem Gestel
- Jaap Gidding
- Julia Giesberts
- Agnieta Gijswijt
- Frits Giltay
- Willem Giltay
- Paul Gimbel
- Lizzy Goddard
- Nelly Goedewaagen
- Jan Goedhart
- Andries Johannes Jacobus van Gool
- Jos Gosschalk
- Móric Góth
- Sárika Góth
- Helena Elisabeth Goudeket
- Johannes Graadt van Roggen
- Gerrit David Gratama
- Lina Gratama
- Janneke Anette de Grave
- Jan Grégoire
- Jos Grieken
- J.P. Griep
- Berend Groeneveld
- Theo Groeneveld
- Jac Groot
- T.L.M. de Groot
- John Grosman

H

- T. Haanebrink
- Johan Haanstra
- Dirk van Haaren
- Willem Frederik Haas
- Wim de Haas
- Herman Habes
- Jan Habets
- J.G. van Haersolte - de Lange
- Hendrik Anton Hage
- Mattijs Hage
- Jan van Ham
- Toon van Ham
- Jack Hamel
- Willem Hamel
- Flip Hamers
- Rinze Hamstra
- Nita Hannema
- Otto Hanrath
- Jacob Gerard Hansen
- Anna van Harinxma thoe Slooten
- Dirk Harting
- Marianne Hartong
- Wim Harzing
- Nola Hatterman
- Jacobus Haver Droeze
- Jan van Heel
- Simon de Heer
- Annie van der Heide-Hemsing
- Reinier Heiloo
- Wim Heinecke
- Franz Helfferich
- Johan van Hell
- Eduard Hellendoorn
- Albert Hemelman
- Johan Hemkes
- Alida Sophia Hendriks
- Arend Hendriks
- Meindert Hendriks
- Johann Wilhelm Henke
- Hendrik Henrichs
- Henk Henriët
- Jan Andries Herfst
- Felix Hess
- Johannes Albertus Hesterman Jr.
- Roeloffina van Heteren-Vink
- Geertruida van Hettinga Tromp
- Herman Heuff
- Johannes Heuperman
- B.J. van Heusden
- Folke Heybroek
- Herman Heijenbrock
- Marinus Heijnes
- Kees Heynsius
- Hubert van Hille
- Jan Hingman
- Jemmy van Hoboken
- Jacobus H. Hoenderdos
- Wim Hofker
- Antoinette van Hoytema
- Charles Hollman
- Louise van Holthe tot Echten
- Dirk Homberg
- Tine Honig
- Ina Hooft
- Bernard de Hoog
- Hendrik de Hoog
- Maria Ida Adriana Hoogendijk
- Douwe Mattheus Hoogeveen
- Jan Hendrik Hoowij
- Elbert Hooyberg
- Gerard Hordijk
- Lex Horn
- Gé ter Horst
- Eduard Houbolt
- Alida van Houten
- Chiem van Houweninge (1898 1996)
- Albert Hovenkamp
- Frits Hubeek
- Henriette Hubregtse-Lanzing
- Jan Hul
- Mathieu Hul
- Han Hulsbergen
- Albertus Gerhard Hulshoff Pol
- Ber Hulsing
- A.E. van Humalda van Eysinga (Jhr)
- Frieda Hunziker
- Vilmos Huszár
- Cornelis Teunis Huussen
- Dorothée Huysinga
- Gerard Huysser

I

- Jacques Idserda
- Hendrikus IJkelenstam
- Cees van Ijsseldijk
- Jacques Ijsselmuiden
- Jan Ingenhoes

J

- Gijs Jacobs van den Hof
- Mirjam Jacobson
- Jan Jans
- Co Jansen
- E.A. Jansen
- Jan Meine Jansen
- Lambert Jansen
- Willem George Frederik Jansen
- H.J. Jansen van Galen
- J.A.H. Jaspers
- Everhard Jekel
- Samuel Jessurun de Mesquita
- Johannes Antonius Fredericus Joghems
- Henri Jonas
- Germ de Jong
- Gerrit de Jong
- Toon de Jong
- Johanna Alida Catharina de Jonge
- Marie de Jonge
- Roelf Jongman
- Jan Jordens
- Johannes Hendricus Jurres

K

- Jaap Kaal
- Dorry Kahn-Weyl
- Harm Kamerlingh Onnes
- Johan Bernard Kamp
- Fokke Kamstra
- Otto B. de Kat
- Henriette Agnete Kitty von Kaulbach
- Lucie Keijser
- Antony Keizer
- Marie Kelting
- Bernard Johan Kerkhof
- Gerard Kerkhoff
- Johan Kerkmeijer
- Adriaan Keus
- Jan Kijff
- Marie Kilsdonk
- Reimond Kimpe
- Nel Klaassen
- Ekke Kleima
- Frits Klein
- Jan Kleintjes
- Willem Klijn
- Samuel Klinkenberg
- Piet Kloes
- Cornelis Kloos
- Nicolaas Kluijver
- Nel Kluitman
- Albert Klijn
- Josina Knap
- Willem Knip
- Rie Knipscheer
- Olga van Iterson-Knoepfle
- Elize Knuttel
- Gerardus Johannes Koekkoek
- Kobus Koeman
- Willem Koerse
- Willem de Kok
- Mark Kolthoff
- Douwe Komter
- Cornelis Koning
- Dirk Koning
- Edzard Koning
- Roeland Koning
- Ulco Kooistra
- Lody van Kooten Jr.
- Cornelis Koppenol
- Louis Kortenhorst
- Jan Korthals
- Jo Koster
- Klaas Koster (kunstschilder)
- Nicolaas van der Kreek
- Alfred Krenz
- Mijndert Krijnsen
- Johannes Jacobus Kroon
- Gerard Kroone
- Hildo Krop
- Han Krug
- Louis Krüger
- Dirk Kruizinga
- Johan Alexander Kruseman
- Frederik Adolf Krüsmann
- Harrie Kuyten
- Willem van Kuilenburg
- Sjoerd Kuperus
- Giselle Kuster
- Cornel Kwint

L

- Jan Lamberts
- Clemens van Lamsweerde
- Anna Clasina Op 't Land
- Daan de Lange
- Jan Bernaard de Lange
- Ger Langeweg
- Sara Ledeboer
- Coba van der Lee
- Arie Leeflang
- E.C. Leegstra
- Wiert Hendrik Leemhuis
- Titus Leeser
- Cornelis de Leeuw
- Dirk de Leeuw
- Cor van Leeuwen
- Henk van Leeuwen
- Marinus Willem Gustus Leeuwen
- Willem van Leeuwen
- Anna Lehmann
- David Jacob van Lennep (1896-1982)
- Henriëtte Johanna van Lent-Gort
- Johannes Leopold
- Gerard van Lerven
- Willem van Leusden
- Hubert Levigne
- Willem van Lierop
- Johan van der Linde (jr.)
- Hubert van Lith
- Alfred Löb
- Jan Lodeizen
- Lou Loeber
- Josephus Bernardus Antonius Lohman
- Theo Lohmann
- Huub Loontjens
- Albert Loots
- Eugène Lücker
- Gerrit Lulof
- Huib Luns
- Theo Luns
- Joop van Lunteren
- Jaap Luttge
- Ans Luttge-Deetman
- Dick van Luijn

M

- Henri MacLean
- Harry Maas
- Marie Henry Mackenzie
- Karin Mader
- J.C.F.H. Magendans
- Jan Henri Makkink
- Kees Maks
- Adrianus Marchal
- Mien Marchant
- Henriëtte Marcus
- Jacques Maris
- Gijsbert George Martens
- Arend Jan Massink
- Johan Hendrik van Mastenbroek
- Herman Mees
- Johan Meijer
- Sal Meijer
- Tom Meijer
- Frederika Wilhelmina Christina Teding van Berkhout-de Meijere
- Frans Meijers
- Louis Meijs
- Mattheus Carel August Meischke
- Henk Melgers
- Cornelis Mension
- Hermann Friedrich Mertens
- Antonia ter Meulen
- Harmen Meurs
- Jan Anthony Adriaan (Jan) van Meurs
- Arie van Mever
- Pierre Michel
- Judy Michiels van Kessenich
- Johan Miedema
- Willem Minderman
- Adrianus Miolée
- Charles Moen
- Ro Mogendorff
- Toon van der Molen
- Tijmen Moll
- Johannes Abraham Mondt
- François Albertinus Mooy
- Chris Moret
- Hendrik Cornelis van Mourik
- Jacques van Mourik
- Pauline Johanna Gesine Mouthaan
- Toon van den Muijsenberg
- Albert Mulder
- Jan Mulder (1895-1988)
- Wim Mulder
- Bertha Müller (1883-1968)
- Xeno Münninghoff

N

- Isaäc Naarden
- Jan Coenraad Nachenius
- Dirk Berend Nanninga
- Mien Nanninga
- Max Nauta
- Gerrit van 't Net
- Elie Neuburger
- Albert Neuhuys (1895-1968)
- Arnold Bernard Neujean
- Jacqueline Marguerite van Nie
- Kasper Niehaus
- Leonardus Josephus Niehorster
- Carl Cornelis van Niekerk
- Willem van Nieuwenhoven (1879-1973)
- Gustaaf van Nifterik
- Johan Christiaan Nijlandrkd
- Suzanne Nijs
- Hans van Norden
- Henriëtte Gesina Numans

O

- Elisabeth Obreen
- Wim Oepts
- Otto ten Oever
- Albert Oger
- Suze Oosterhuis-van der Stok
- Henri van Os Delhez
- Betsy Westendorp-Osieck
- Tames Oud
- Jan Ouwersloot
- Coen van Oven
- Gijsbertus Johannes van Overbeek

P

- Corrie Pabst
- Hanny Paehlig
- Abraham Arnoldus Pakkoo
- Ru Paré
- Jan Peeters (1912 - 1992)
- Bart Peizel
- Rudolf Ernst Penning
- Jan Pennings
- Henriëtte Pessers
- Lukas Peterich
- Piet_Peters_(kunstenaar)
- Adri Pieck
- Johanna Pieneman
- Johannes Antonius Pietersen
- Reinier Pijnenburg
- Edith Elizabeth Pijpers
- Leonard Pinkhof
- Adriaan van der Plas
- George Pletser
- Toon Pluymers
- Femmetje Marijke Poel
- Henk Poesiat
- Christiaan Pointl
- Arend van de Pol
- Hugo Polderman (1886 - 1977)
- Johan Ponsioen
- Jan Ponstijn
- Jan Poortenaar
- Justin van de Port
- Charlotte Pothuis
- Ko Prange
- Claas Prins
- Riekele Prins
- Maria Pronk-Rompelman
- Johannes Proost
- Pieter Puijpe

R

- Marinus van Raalte
- Willem Rädecker
- Cecilia Maria Elisabeth de Ranitz
- Johan Bernhard Ludwig Reelfs
- Etie van Rees
- Koen van Rees
- Willem Karel Rees
- Gustavus Valère Marie Hubert Regout
- Piet de Regt
- Marie van Regteren Altena
- Han Rehm
- Hans Reicher
- Herman van Remmen
- Henriëtte Johanna Reuchlin-Lucardie
- Theo van Reijn
- Piet Rezelman
- Bernard Richters
- Han Richters
- Ietske Richters
- Marius Richters
- Theo Riegstra
- Jan Rijlaarsdam
- Thijs Rinsema
- Coba Ritsema
- Henri Ritzen
- Johannes Cornelis Roelandse
- Willem Elisa Roelofs (1874-1940)
- Johannes Cornelis Gerardus A. Roest
- Cornelis Rol
- Herman Romijn
- Bethijl Philippus van Romondt
- Frans Ronda
- Hendrikus Elias Roodenburg
- Dorus Roovers
- Lize Rose
- Suze Rosse
- Jos Rovers
- Chris le Roy
- Hans Royaards (1902-1975)
- Willem Jacob Rozendaal
- Gra Rueb
- Georg Rueter
- Alida Henriëtte Runeman

S

- Saraochim Salim
- Henri Savrij
- Jaap Sax
- Gerbrand Frederik van Schagen
- Lodewijk Schelfhout
- Johan Scherrewitz
- Frits Schiller
- Marinus Schipper
- Carl Eberhard Schlüter
- Willy Van Schoonhoven Van Beurden
- Anthonie Pieter Schotel
- Lizzy Schouten
- Wout Schram
- Louis Schrikkel
- Sierk Schröder
- David Schulman
- Louis Schutte
- Bertha thoe Schwartzenberg
- Maria Adeline Alice Schweistal
- Jos Seckel
- Adrianus Wilhelmus Selhorst
- Henri Sicking
- Willem Siedenburg
- William Henry Singer
- Frans Slager
- Suze Slager-Velsen
- Viry Slijper
- Gerardus Hermanus Johannes Sluijter
- Willy Sluiter
- Anton Smeerdijk
- Alberta Johanna Meijer-Smetz
- Elisabeth Bol-Smit
- Ineke Smit
- Jan Smit Kzn
- Hobbe Smith
- Johan Smith (1900-1958)
- C.P. Snijders b. 1904
- Andree de Sobocka
- Christiaan Soer (1882-1961)
- Leonida Sologaub
- Truus van Someren Gréve
- Louis Soonius
- Johan Spaling (1891-1974)
- Frederika Springer
- Ludwig Stainer
- Henri Johan van der Stal
- Jacq Stal
- G.J. Staller
- Arend van Starrenburg
- Pieter Starreveld
- Cephas Stauthamer
- Louis van der Steen
- Jan Jelmer Steenhuis (1897-1983)
- Wim Steijn
- Johann von Stein
- Marie van Waning-Stevels
- Koos Stikvoort
- Dick Stins
- Theo Stiphout
- Charles Stok
- Hans van der Stok
- Agnes van Stolk
- Sara van Stolk
- Heinrich Wilhelm Christian Stolle
- Corry Stolp
- Barend Hendrik Stomps
- Pierre Stordiau
- Michiel Straasheijm
- B. Straithon - van Gelder
- Theo Swagemakers

T

- Jan Tebben
- Josefa Tepe
- Carl Thoenies
- Jan Tiele
- George Tielens
- Kees Timmer
- Adriaan Timmers
- Frans Timmers
- Jan van Tongeren
- René P. Tonneyck
- Ersika Tóth
- Jelle Troelstra

V

- Willem Valk
- Hendrik Valk
- Karel van Veen
- Johan Laurent ter Veer
- Jacobus Marinus Augustinus Veerman
- Paul van der Ven
- Eduard Verboog
- Johannes Nicolaas Anthonius Vergeer
- Margaretha C. Verheus
- Josef Verheyen (1899 - 1976)
- Andreas Jacobus Verhorst
- Jan Veringa (1907 - 1982)
- Lucas Verkoren
- Albert Verschuuren
- Leonard Pieter Versteeg
- Henri Verstijnen
- Johanna Helena Viertelhausen
- Dirk Vis
- Heyme Vis
- Reinder Visscher
- Jan Visser
- Tjipke Visser
- Tula Marina di Vista
- Gerard van Vliet
- Tilly Münninghoff-van Vliet
- Leendert van der Vlist
- Koos van Vlijmen
- Leendert de Vogel
- Adrianus Volkers
- Maurice Volkhemer
- Dirk Volz
- Gerard Voogd
- Kees de Voogt
- Charles Vos
- Henri Vos
- Jo Voskuil
- Jeroen Voskuyl
- Cornelis Vreedenburgh
- Herman Vreedenburgh
- Martinus Vreugde
- Hendrik de Vries
- Johan Marinus de Vries (1892-1982)

W

- Leo van Waegeningh
- Jaap Wagemaker
- Hendrik Adriaan van der Wal
- Petrus Marinus van Walcheren
- Willem van de Walle
- Ben Walrecht
- Herman Walstra
- Willem Abraham Wassenaar
- Catharina Elisabeth Wassink
- Gisèle d'Ailly van Waterschoot van der Gracht
- Charles Weddepohl
- Hendrik Weegewijs
- Barend Hendrik Ter Weeme
- Theo ter Weeme
- Fedde Weidema
- Jaap Weyand
- Jan Harm Weijns
- Ype Wenning
- Clara Adriana van der Werff
- Wouter Marinus van de Werk (1875-1969)
- Hendrik Nicolaas Werkman
- Frans Werner
- Jobs Wertheim
- Hendrik Jan Wesseling
- Hendrik Jacobus Westendorp
- Gerhard Westermann
- Johannes Embrosius van de Wetering de Rooij
- Berend Wolter Weyers
- Jan Wiegers
- Willem Wiegmans
- Ids Wiersma
- Joub Wiertz
- Louis Frederik Wijmans
- Wilhelmus Lambertus Wijmans
- Willem Abraham de Wijn
- Piet van Wijngaerdt
- George Wildschut
- Marie Willeboordse
- Wilhelmus Antonius Willemsen
- Karl Willerding
- Paul Windhausen (1903-1944)
- Johan Walraven van Winkoop
- Jos Wins
- Willem Witjens
- Jan Wittenberg (artist)
- Dirk Wolbers
- Hendrik Jan Wolter
- Gerrit Woudt
- Wilm Wouters
- Elsa Woutersen-van Doesburgh
- Gonda Wulfse

Z

- Ed van Zanden
- Jan van der Zee
- Janus van Zeegen jr.
- Agatha Zethraeus
- Louis de Zwart
- Johan van Zweden
- Douwe van der Zweep
- Piet Zwiers
- Jac Zwijsen
