= Louise van Holthe tot Echten =

Dutch artist

- Born: 26 March 1892; Utrecht, Netherlands
- Died: 20 November 1981 (aged 89); Doorn, Netherlands
- Other names: Maria Louise van Holthe tot Echten
- Known for: Painting

Louise van Holthe tot Echten (1892-1981) was a Dutch painter.

== Biography ==
Holthe tot Echten was born on 26 March 1892 in Utrecht. She studied with Henk Bremmer and Nicolas Eekman. She was a member of the Schilder- en teekengenootschap Kunstliefde (Utrecht). Holthe tot Echten's work was included in the 1939 exhibition and sale Onze Kunst van Heden (Our Art of Today) at the Rijksmuseum in Amsterdam. Holthe tot Echten died on 20 November 1981 in Doorn.
