= Suze Oosterhuis-van der Stok =

Dutch artist

- Born: Suze van der Stok; 17 July 1910; The Hague, Netherlands
- Died: 29 August 1989 (aged 79); Amersfoort, Netherlands
- Other names: Johanna Suzanna Oosterhuis-van der Stok
- Known for: Monumental art, Ceramics
- Spouse: J.H. Oosterhuis

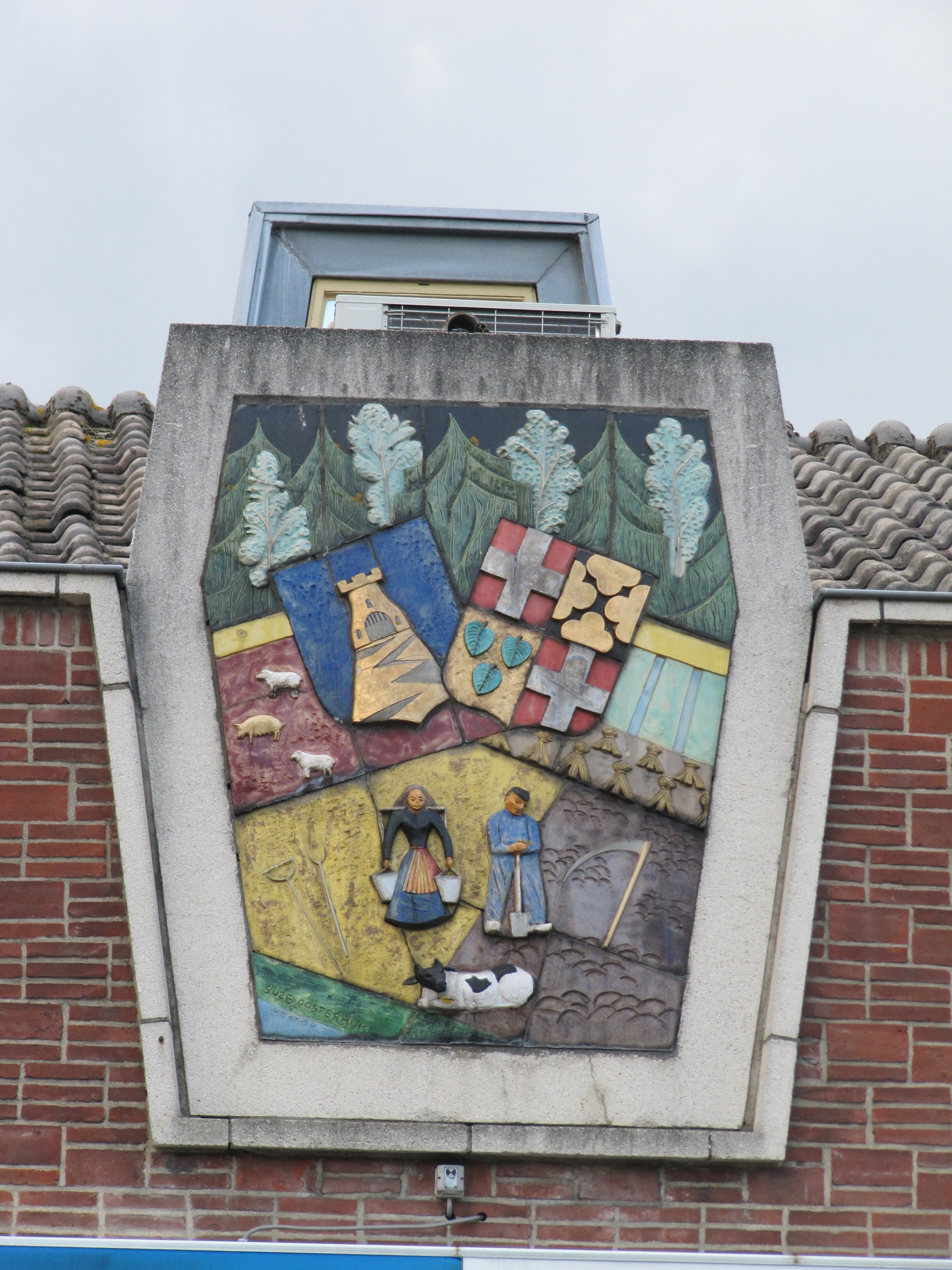
Relief on the facade of Hamersveldseweg 2 in Leusden, 1956 by Oosterhuis-van der Stok

Johanna Suzanna Oosterhuis-van der Stok (1910-1989) was a Dutch ceramist.

== Biography ==
Oosterhuis-van der Stok née Stok was born on 17 July 1910 in The Hague. She attended the Akademie van beeldende kunsten (Royal Academy of Art, The Hague). She studied with Henk Meijer (kunstenaar). She traveled to London and Paris where she studied with André Lhote. She was married to J.H. Oosterhuis. Her work was included in the 1939 exhibition and sale Onze Kunst van Heden (Our Art of Today) at the Rijksmuseum in Amsterdam. She was a member of the Pulchri Studio in The Hague.

Oosterhuis-van der Stok died on 29 August 1989 in Amersfoort.
