= Cecilia Maria Elisabeth de Ranitz =

Dutch artist

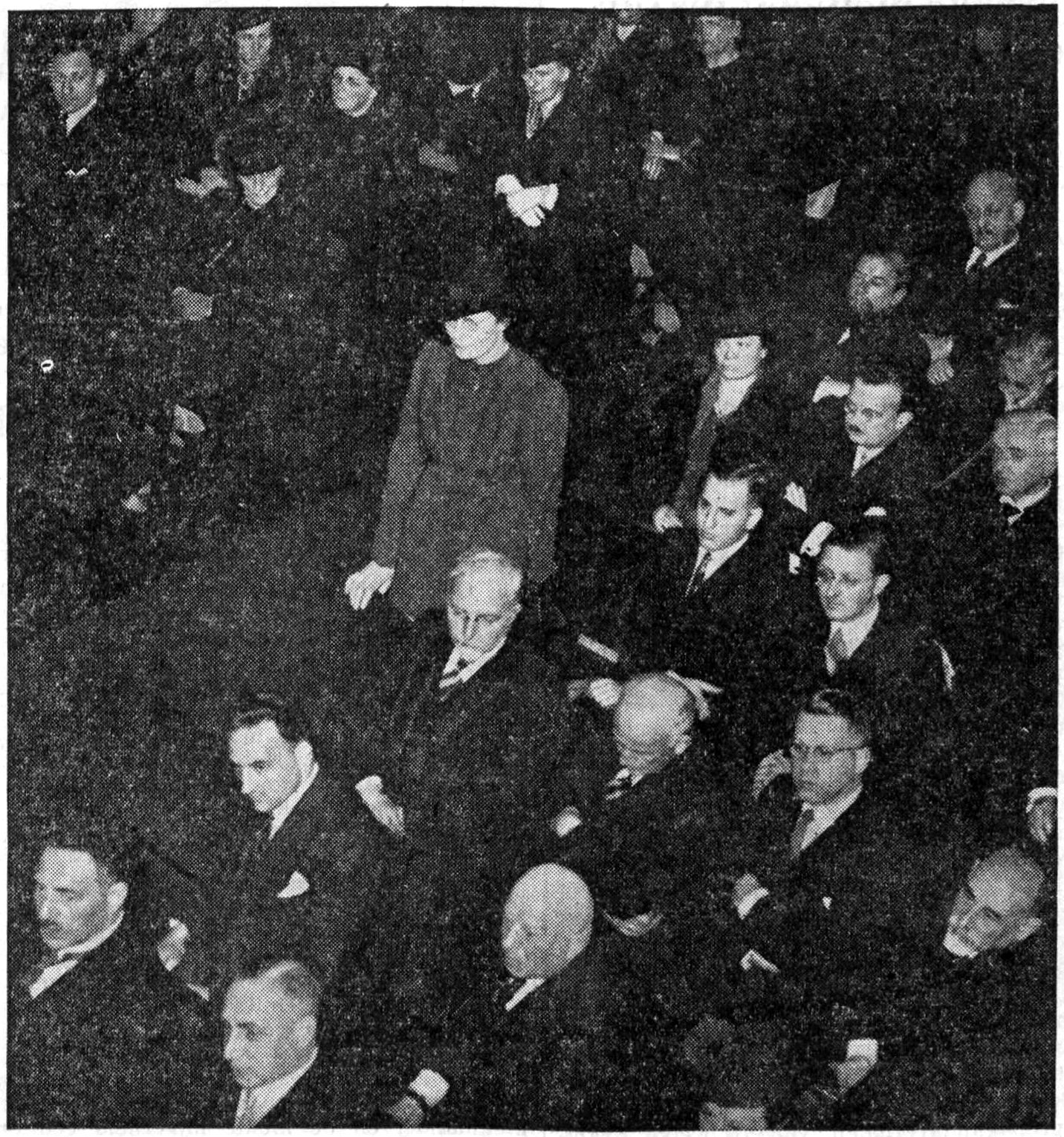
- C. M. de Ranitz (standing in the middle) received a golden medal during the dies natalis of the University of Amsterdam in 1939
- Born: 2 June 1880; Utrecht, Netherlands
- Died: 9 April 1970 (aged 89); Amsterdam, Netherlands
- Known for: Painting

Cecilia Maria Elisabeth de Ranitz (1880-1970) was a Dutch painter.

== Biography ==
Ranitz was born on 2 June 1880 in Utrecht. She studied with Hendrik Maarten Krabbé, Klaas van Leeuwen, and Martin Monnickendam.

Her work was included in the 1939 exhibition and sale Onze Kunst van Heden (Our Art of Today) at the Rijksmuseum in Amsterdam. She was a member of the Arti et Amicitiae and Kunstenaarsvereniging Sint Lucas.

Ranitz had also studied medicine and had received her PhD in 1941. In 1956 she was appointed Professor of internal medicine at the Airlangga University in Surabaya, East Java.

Ranitz died on 9 April 1970 in Amsterdam.
