= Han Krug =

Dutch painter (1890–1977)

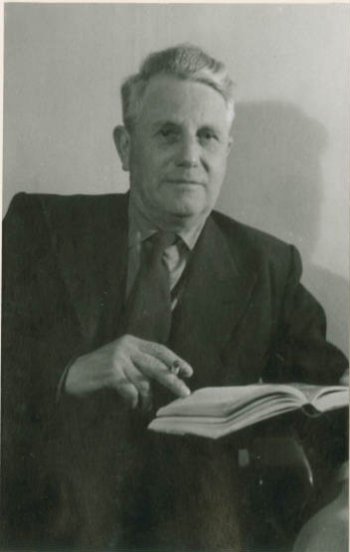
- Krug in 1950
- Born: 21 December 1890; The Hague, Netherlands
- Died: 20 March 1977 (aged 86); The Hague, Netherlands
- Occupation: Painter

Han Krug (21 December 1890 – 20 March 1977) was a Dutch painter. His work was part of the painting event in the art competition at the 1936 Summer Olympics. Krug's work was included in the 1939 exhibition and sale Onze Kunst van Heden (Our Art of Today) at the Rijksmuseum in Amsterdam.
