= Henriette Hubregtse-Lanzing =

Dutch artist (1879–1959)

- Born: Henriëtte Rosina Dorothea Lanzing; 18 July 1879; Maastricht, Netherlands
- Died: 28 February 1959 (aged 79); The Hague, Netherlands
- Other names: Henriëtte Rosina Dorothea van Putten - Lanzing
- Known for: Painting

Henriette Rosina Dorothea Hubregtse-Lanzing (18 July 1879 – 28 February 1959) was a Dutch painter.

== Biography ==
Hubregtse-Lanzing was born on 18 July 1879 in Maastricht. She studied at the Rijksnormaalschool voor Teekenonderwijzers (National Normal School for Drawing Teachers) in Amsterdam and the School voor Kunstnijverheid (Haarlem) (School of Arts and Crafts) in Haarlem. Her teachers included Hendrik Maarten Krabbé and Albert Roelofs. Her work was included in the 1939 exhibition and sale Onze Kunst van Heden (Our Art of Today) at the Rijksmuseum in Amsterdam. Hubregtse-Lanzing was a member of the Kunstenaarsvereniging Laren-Blaricum.

Hubregtse-Lanzing was married twice, in 1904 to A.M. Hubregtse (1880-1925), then in 1927 to Th.E. van Putten (1872-1950). She died on 28 February 1959 in The Hague.
