= Agatha Zethraeus =

Dutch artist

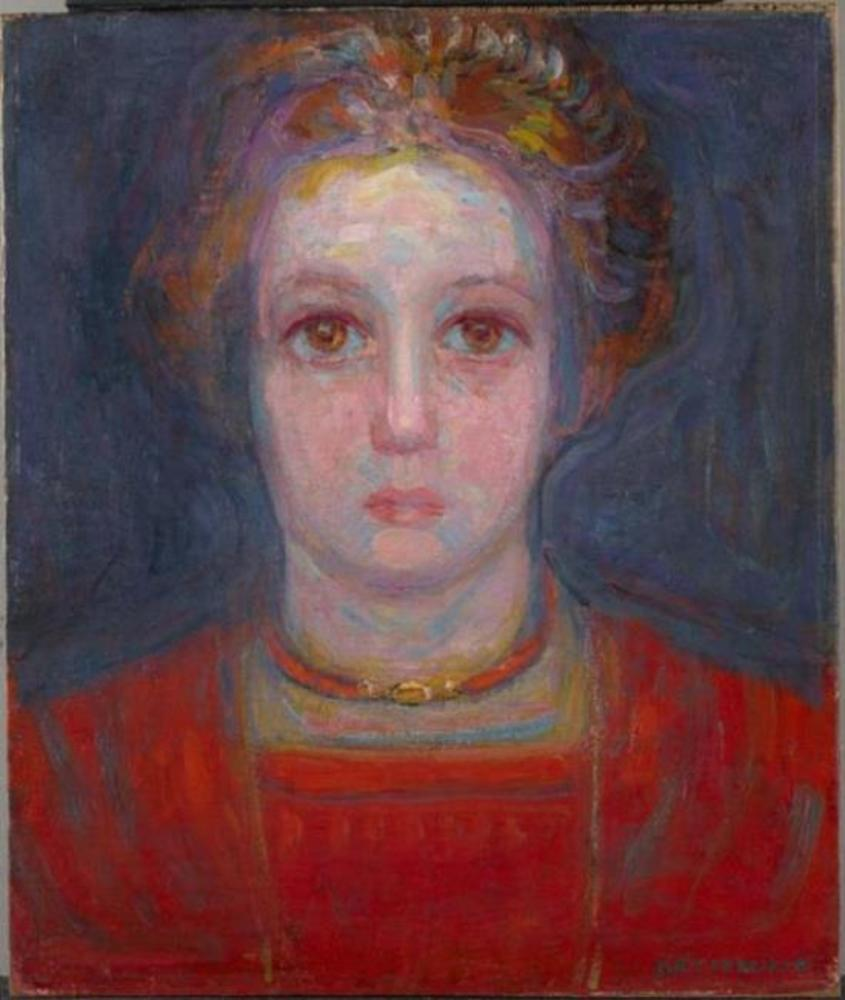
- Meisje in rood (Agatha Zethraeus) by Piet Mondriaan, 1908
- Born: Agatha Wilhelmina Zethraeus; 23 December 1872; Amsterdam, Netherlands
- Died: 25 July 1966 (aged 93); Zeist, Netherlands
- Known for: Painting

Agatha Wilhelmina Zethraeus (1872–1966) was a Dutch artist.

== Biography ==
Zethraeus was born on 23 December 1872 in Amsterdam. She studied at the Dagtekenschool voor meisjes (English:Day drawing school for girls) . She studied under Jan Hanau, Wilhelmina Cornelia Kerlen, Cornelis Kuypers, Piet Mondrian, and Piet van Wijngaerdt. Her work was included in the 1939 exhibition and sale Onze Kunst van Heden (Our Art of Today) at the Rijksmuseum in Amsterdam. She was a member of the Arti et Amicitiae, De Onafhankelijken (The Independents), and Pictura Veluvensis. She exhibited regularly with Kunstenaarsvereniging Sint Lucas from 1911 through 1944 and with De Onafhankelijken from 1919 through 1960.

Zethraeus was a student, model and friend of Piet Mondrian. They knew each other from at least 1907 until his death in 1944. She is the subject of his painting Meisje in rood (Girl in red). It is unclear if they had a romantic relationship.

Zethraeus died on 25 July 1966 in Zeist.

== Legacy ==
In 2015 The Mondriaan House held an exhibition Agatha Zethraeus - Vriendin, leerling en model van Piet Mondriaan (Agatha Zethraeus - Friend, pupil and model of Piet Mondrian).
