= Agnes van Stolk =

Dutch artist (1898–1980)

- Born: 16 November 1898; Hof van Delft (now Delft), Netherlands
- Died: 11 August 1980 (aged 81); Wassenaar, Netherlands
- Known for: Painting

Agnes Johanna Elisabeth van Stolk (1898-1980) was a Dutch artist.

== Biography ==
Stolk was born on 16 November 1898 in Hof van Delft. She attended the Vrije Academie voor Beeldende Kunsten (Free Academy of Visual Art) in the Hague. She studied with Berend Adrianus Bongers, Francis de Erdely, Chris de Moor, Dirk Nijland, and Johan Tielens. Her work was included in the 1939 exhibition and sale Onze Kunst van Heden (Our Art of Today) at the Rijksmuseum in Amsterdam. She was a member of the Haagse Kunstkring (The Hague Art Circle) and Teekengenootschap Pictura (Pictura drawing society).

Stolk died on 11 August 1980 in Wassenaar.
