= Lucie Keijser =

Dutch artist (1875–1958)

- Born: Lucia Paulina Keijser; 9 December 1875; Amsterdam, Netherlands
- Died: 26 January 1958 (aged 82); Laren, Netherlands
- Other name: Lucie Ruijneman-Keijser
- Known for: Painting

Lucia Paulina Keijser (1875-1958) was a Dutch painter known for her floral still lifes.

== Biography ==
Keijser was born on 9 December 1875 in Amsterdam. She studied at Rijksnormaalschool voor Teekenonderwijzers (National Normal School for Drawing Teachers) in Amsterdam. She was taught by Carel Dake and Jan Derk Huibers. Keijser was married twice; first to G. L. Wittig and after his death to R. Ruijneman.

Keijser's work was included in the 1939 exhibition and sale Onze Kunst van Heden (Our Art of Today) at the Rijksmuseum in Amsterdam. She was a member of De Onafhankelijken (The Independents) and Kunstenaarsvereniging Laren-Blaricum (Association for Visual Arts Laren-Blaricum).

Keijser died on 26 January 1958 in Laren, North Holland.
