= Rie Knipscheer =

Dutch artist

- Born: Marie Gerarda Cornelia Knipscheer; 6 April 1911; Amsterdam, Netherlands
- Died: 13 February 2003 (aged 91); Laren, North Holland, Netherlands
- Other names: Rie Rooker-Knipscheer
- Known for: Painting

Marie "Rie" Gerarda Cornelia Knipscheer (1911-2003) was a Dutch artist.

== Biography ==
Knipscheer was born on 6 April 1911 in Amsterdam. She attended the Instituut voor Kunstnijverheidsonderwijs (Institute for Applied Arts Education now the Gerrit Rietveld Academie) and the Rijksakademie van beeldende kunsten (State Academy of Fine Arts). Her teachers included Johannes Hendricus Jurres and Hendrik Jan Wolter. She was married to J. Rooker. Her work was included in the 1939 exhibition and sale Onze Kunst van Heden (Our Art of Today) at the Rijksmuseum in Amsterdam. She was a member of Arti et Amicitiae and Kunstenaarsvereniging Sint Lucas

Knipscheer died on 3 February 2003 in Laren, North Holland.
