= Anna Lehmann =

Dutch artist

- Born: Anna Elisabeth Frederika Lehmann; 31 July 1876; Delft, Netherlands
- Died: 23 March 1956 (aged 79); The Hague, Netherlands
- Other names: Anna Koppenol-Lehmann
- Known for: Painting, Etching
- Spouse: Cornelis Koppenol

Anna Elisabeth Frederika Lehmann (1876-1956) was a Dutch artist.

== Biography ==
Lehmann was born on 31 July 1876 in Delft. She studied at the Akademie van beeldende kunsten (Den Haag) (Royal Academy of Art, The Hague). She was taught by Johannes Josephus Aarts, Frits Jansen, Bernard Schluit, and Cornelis Koppenol. Lehmann married Koppenol.

Lehmann's work was included in the 1939 exhibition and sale Onze Kunst van Heden (Our Art of Today) at the Rijksmuseum in Amsterdam. She was a member of the Pulchri Studio, the Haagse Kunstkring, and Kunstenaarsvereniging Sint Lucas.

Klaassen died on 23 March 1956 in The Hague.
