= Bertha thoe Schwartzenberg =

Dutch artist

- Bertha thoe Schwartzenberg, 1993
- Born: 8 January 1891; Rothenburg, Netherlands
- Died: 31 August 1993 (aged 102); Hilversum, Netherlands
- Known for: Sculpture

Bertha Koster-thoe Schwartzenberg en Hohenlansberg (1891–1993) was a Dutch sculptor.

== Biography ==
Schwartzenberg was born on 8 January 1891 in Rothenburg. She studied with Joseph Mendes da Costa. She was married to fellow artist Klaas Koster (painter) (1885–1969). Her work was included in the 1939 exhibition and sale Onze Kunst van Heden (Our Art of Today) at the Rijksmuseum in Amsterdam. She was a member of the Arti et Amicitiae, the Kunstenaarsvereniging Laren-Blaricum (Artists association Laren-Blaricum), the Nederlandse Kring van Beeldhouwersand (Dutch Circle of Sculptors), and the Vereniging van Beeldende Kunstenaars Hilversum (Association of Visual Artists Hilversum).

Schwartzenberg died in 1993 at Hilversum at the age of 102.
