= Coba van der Lee =

Dutch artist

- Born: Jacoba Adriana van der Lee; 6 January 1893; Rotterdam, Netherlands
- Died: 14 September 1972 (aged 79); Hilversum, Netherlands
- Known for: Painting

Jacoba "Coba" Adriana van der Lee (1893-1972) was a Dutch artist.

== Biography ==
Van der Lee was born on 6 January 1893 in Rotterdam. She attended the Rijksnormaalschool voor Teekenonderwijzers (National Normal School for Drawing Teachers). In 1911 she married the painter André Idserda with whom she had two children. Her work was included in the 1939 exhibition and sale Onze Kunst van Heden (Our Art of Today) at the Rijksmuseum in Amsterdam. She was a member of the Vereniging van Beeldende Kunstenaars (Association of Visual Artists) in Hilversum. Van der Lee died on 4 September 1972 in Hilversum.
