= Maaike Braat-Rolvink =

Dutch artist

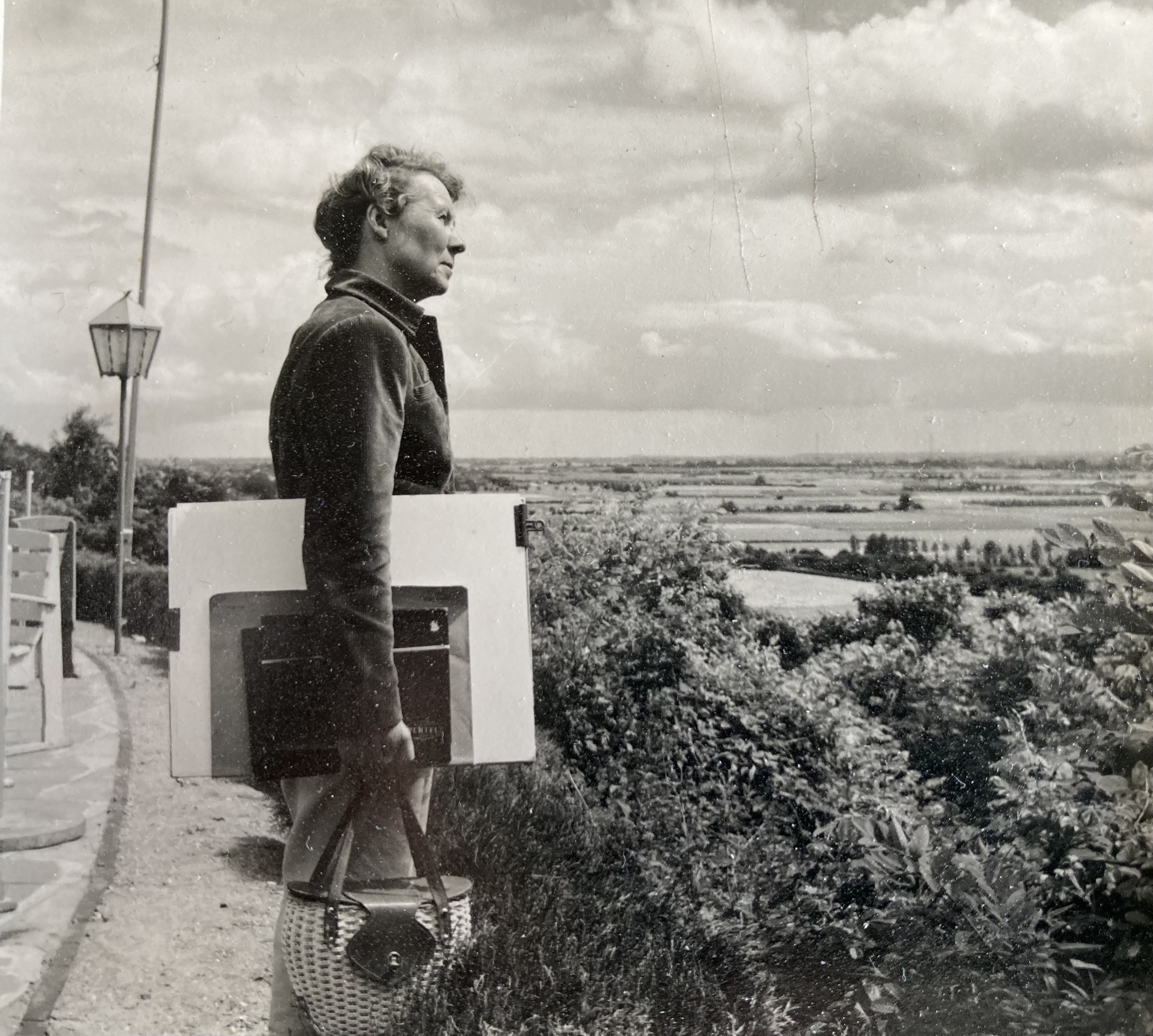
- Born: 12 March 1907; Arnhem, Netherlands
- Died: 23 August 1992 (aged 85); Amsterdam, Netherlands
- Known for: Painting
- Spouse: Leendert Pieter Johan Braat

Maaike Braat-Rolvink (1907-1992) was a Dutch painter.

== Biography ==
Braat-Rolvink née Rolvink was born on 12 March 1907 in Arnhem. She studied at the Kunstoefening (Art Exercise Academy) in Arnhem. Around 1930 she traveled to Paris and studied with Gaston Balande. She was married to the sculptor Leendert Pieter Johan Braat (1908-1982). Her work was included in the 1939 exhibition and sale Onze Kunst van Heden (Our Art of Today) at the Rijksmuseum in Amsterdam. In 1959 she received a silver medal from the city of Paris for her entry to the Salon Féminin at the Musée d’Art Moderne de la Ville de Paris. She was a member of the Federatie van Verenigingen van Beroeps Beeldende Kunstenaars (Federation of Associations of Professional Visual Artists) in Amsterdam. She was also a member of De Zeester.

Braat-Rolvink died on 23 August 1992 in Amsterdam.
