= Etie van Rees =

Dutch artist

- Born: 15 May 1890; Buitenzorg, Dutch East Indies (now Bogor, Indonesia)
- Died: 14 November 1973 (aged 83); Aerdenhout, Netherlands
- Known for: Ceramics

Ecoline "Etie" Adrienne van Rees (1890-1973) was a Dutch ceramist.

== Biography ==
Rees was born on 15 May 1890 in Buitenzorg, Dutch East Indies. She was mostly self-taught, but studied for several months with the Dutch artist Bernard Schregel in The Hague. Her work was included in the 1939 exhibition and sale Onze Kunst van Heden (Our Art of Today) at the Rijksmuseum in Amsterdam. Rees was a member of Vereeniging tot Bevordering der Grafische Kunst (Association for the Promotion of Graphic Art), exhibiting with them in 1938, 1940 and 1941. She was also a member of the Pulchri Studio at The Hague. In 1959 she was awarded Gold Medal of International Ceramic Exhibition in Ostend. In 1964 she had a solo exhibition Tussen mens en dier (Between humans and animals) at the Museum Boijmans Van Beuningen in Rotterdam. The same year she had solo exhibitions at the Gemeentemuseum (Municipal Museum) in Arnhem, the Museum voor Stad en Lande Groningen (the Groninger Museum), and the Gemeentemuseum Den Haag (The Hague Municipal Museum).

Rees died on 14 November 1973 in Aerdenhout, Netherlands.

== Gallery ==
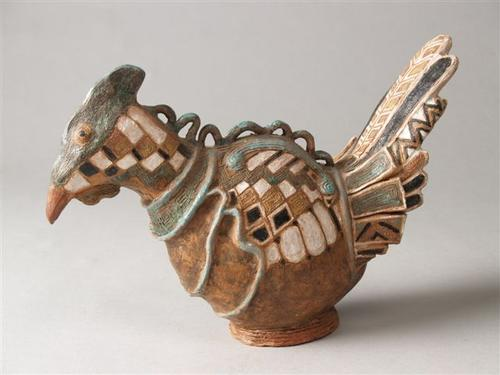
Image of a fantasy bird decorated with white-yellow color fields and a garland over the back (1960)

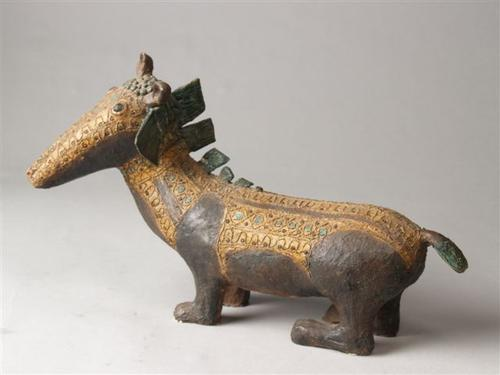
Sculpture in the shape of a dachshund-like fantasy animal with polychrome decoration (1970)

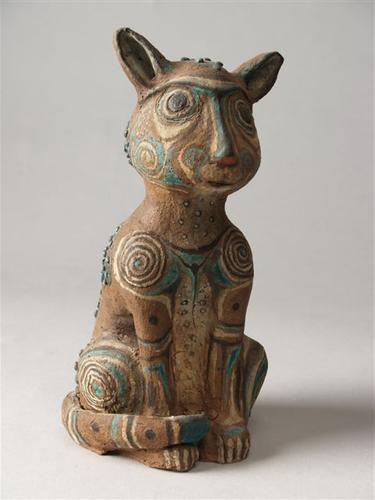
The Stray Cat (1970)

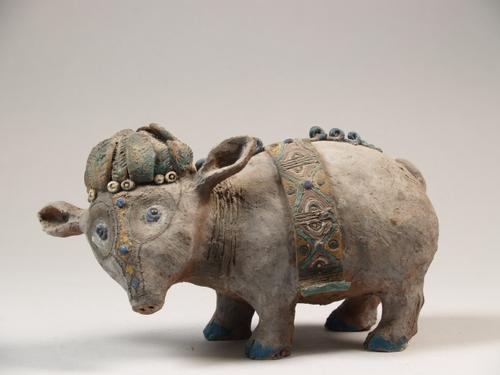
Sculpture in the form of a tapir-like fantasy animal with polychrome decor (1973)

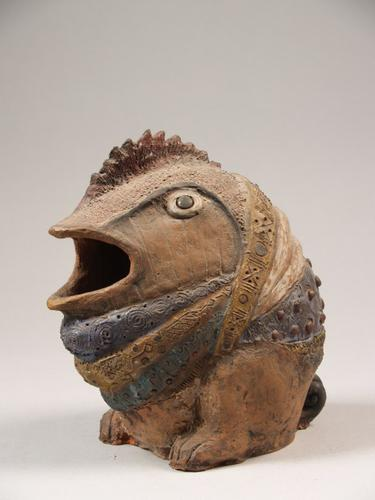
Sculpture in the form of a chick-like creature with polychrome decoration (1973)
