= Dorry Kahn-Weyl =

Dutch artist

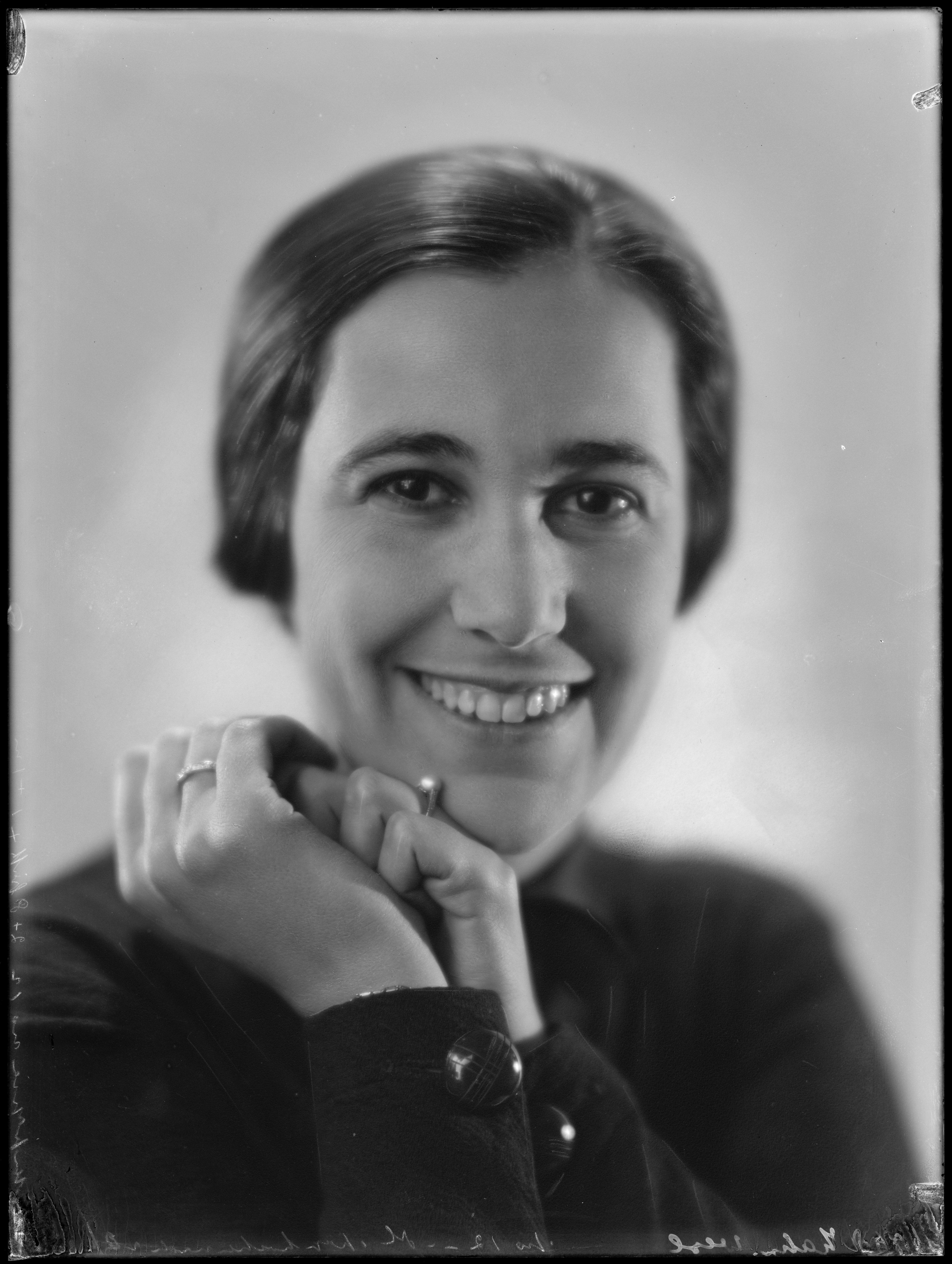
- Born: 19 May 1896; Amsterdam, Netherlands
- Died: 29 August 1981 (aged 85); Amsterdam, Netherlands
- Other names: Dorry Weyl
- Known for: Painting
- Spouse: Henri René Kahn
- Awards: Van der Veenmedaille (resistance medal)

Dorry Kahn-Weyl (1896-1981) was a Dutch artist.

== Biography ==
Kahn-Weyl née Weyl was born on 19 May 1896 in Amsterdam. She was a self-taught painter. In 1921 she married Henri René Kahn (18881970) with whom she had two children. René Kahn was the director of the family fashion house Hirsch & Cie.

Her work was included in the 1939 exhibition and sale Onze Kunst van Heden (Our Art of Today) at the Rijksmuseum in Amsterdam. She was a member of the De Onafhankelijken (The Independents) and Gooische Schildersvereniging (Gooische Painters Association).

Kahn-Weyl's husband was arrested in 1941 after his brother gave an anti-German speech. In 1942 he was arrested again, prompting Dorry and the children to hide in Veluwe.

Kahn-Weyl died on 29 August 1981 in Amsterdam.
