= Marie Willeboordse =

Dutch artist (1902–1989)

- Born: 25 December 1902; Rotterdam, Netherlands
- Died: 18 August 1989 (aged 86); Leidschendam, Netherlands
- Known for: Painting

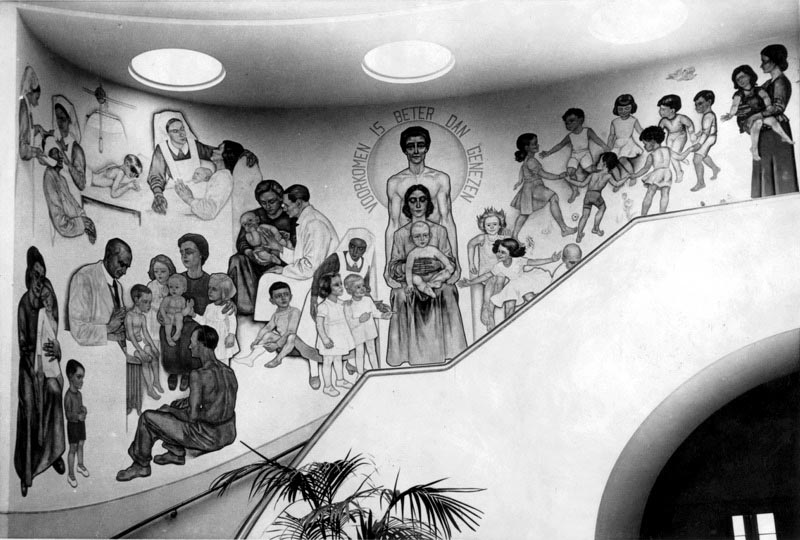
Marie Adriana Willeboordse - Wall painting 1942

Maria Adriana Willeboordse (December 25, 1902 – August 18, 1989) was a Dutch artist.

== Biography ==
Willeboordsel was born on 25 December 1902 in Rotterdam. She attended the Academie voor Beeldende Kunsten (Academy of Visual Arts) in Rotterdam. Her work was included in the 1939 exhibition and sale Onze Kunst van Heden (Our Art of Today) at the Rijksmuseum in Amsterdam. She was a member of the Nederlandse Kunstkring (Dutch Art Circle) in The Hague and the Kunstenaarssociëteit (Artist Society) in Rotterdam.

Willeboordsel died on 18 August 1989 in Leidschendam.
