= Frieda Hunziker =

Dutch artist

- Born: 17 October 1908; Amsterdam, Netherlands
- Died: 9 September 1966 (aged 57); Amsterdam, Netherlands
- Known for: Painting

Frieda Hunziker (17 October 1908 – 9 September 1966) was a Dutch painter.

== Biography ==
Hunziker was born on 17 October 1908 in Amsterdam. She studied at the Rijksnormaalschool voor Teekenonderwijzers (National Normal School for Drawing Teachers).

Hunziker's work was included in the 1939 exhibition and sale Onze Kunst van Heden (Our Art of Today) at the Rijksmuseum in Amsterdam. She also exhibited at the 1945 exhibition Kunst in Vrijheid (Art in Freedom) at the Rijksmuseum. She exhibited regularly at the Stedelijk Museum Amsterdam. Hunziker was one of the original members of the group Vrije Beelden (Free Images). She was a member of De Onafhankelijken.

Hunziker died on 9 September 1966 in Amsterdam.
