= Annie van der Heide =

Dutch artist

Annie van der Heide-Hemsing
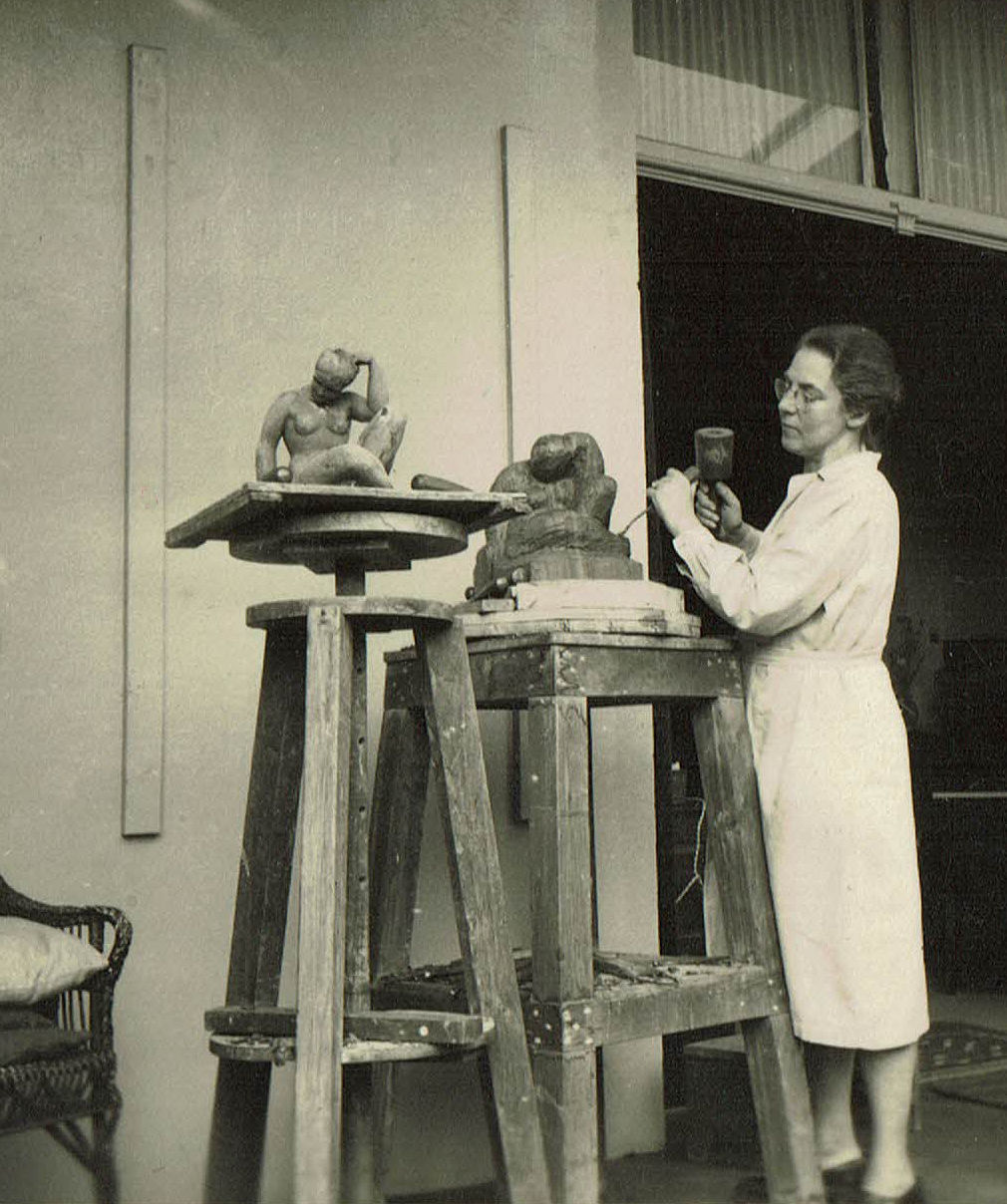
- Born: Anna Petronella Hemsing; 3 March 1896; Amsterdam, Netherlands
- Died: 1 July 1968 (aged 72); Arnhem, Netherlands
- Known for: Painting
- Spouse: Carel Christiaan van der Heide

Annie van der Heide or Annie van der Heide-Hemsing (1896–1968) was a Dutch sculptor.

== Biography ==
Heide-Hemsing née Hemsing was born on 3 March 1896 in Amsterdam. She studied at Kunstoefening (Arnhem). In 1921 she married Carel Christiaan van der Heide. Heide-Hemsing's work was included in the 1939 exhibition and sale Onze Kunst van Heden (Our Art of Today) at the Rijksmuseum in Amsterdam.

Gratama died on 1 July 1968 in Arnhem.
