= Ans Luttge-Deetman =

Dutch artist

Ans Luttge-Deetman (1867-1952) was a Dutch painter.

== Biography ==
Luttge-Deetman née Deetman was born on 10 August 1902 in Zwolle. She attended the Dagtekenschool voor meisjes (English:Day drawing school for girls) in Amsterdam, Rijksakademie van beeldende kunsten (State Academy of Fine Arts), the Instituut voor Kunstnijverheidsonderwijs (Institute for Applied Arts Education), and the Rijksinstituut tot Opleiding van Tekenleraren (National Institute for the Training of Drawing Teachers). Her teachers included Jan Bronner, Jan Uri, Gerhard Westermann, and Hendrik Jan Wolter. She was married to fellow artist Jaap Luttge.

Luttge-Deetman's work was included in the 1939 exhibition and sale Onze Kunst van Heden (Our Art of Today) at the Rijksmuseum in Amsterdam.

Luttge-Deetman died on 16 September 1993 in Weesp.
