= Frederika Henriëtte Broeksmit =

Dutch artist

- Born: 14 August 1875; Charlois (Rotterdam), The Netherlands
- Died: 25 January 1945 (aged 69); Bussum, The Netherlands
- Known for: Painting, Printmaking, Peace activism

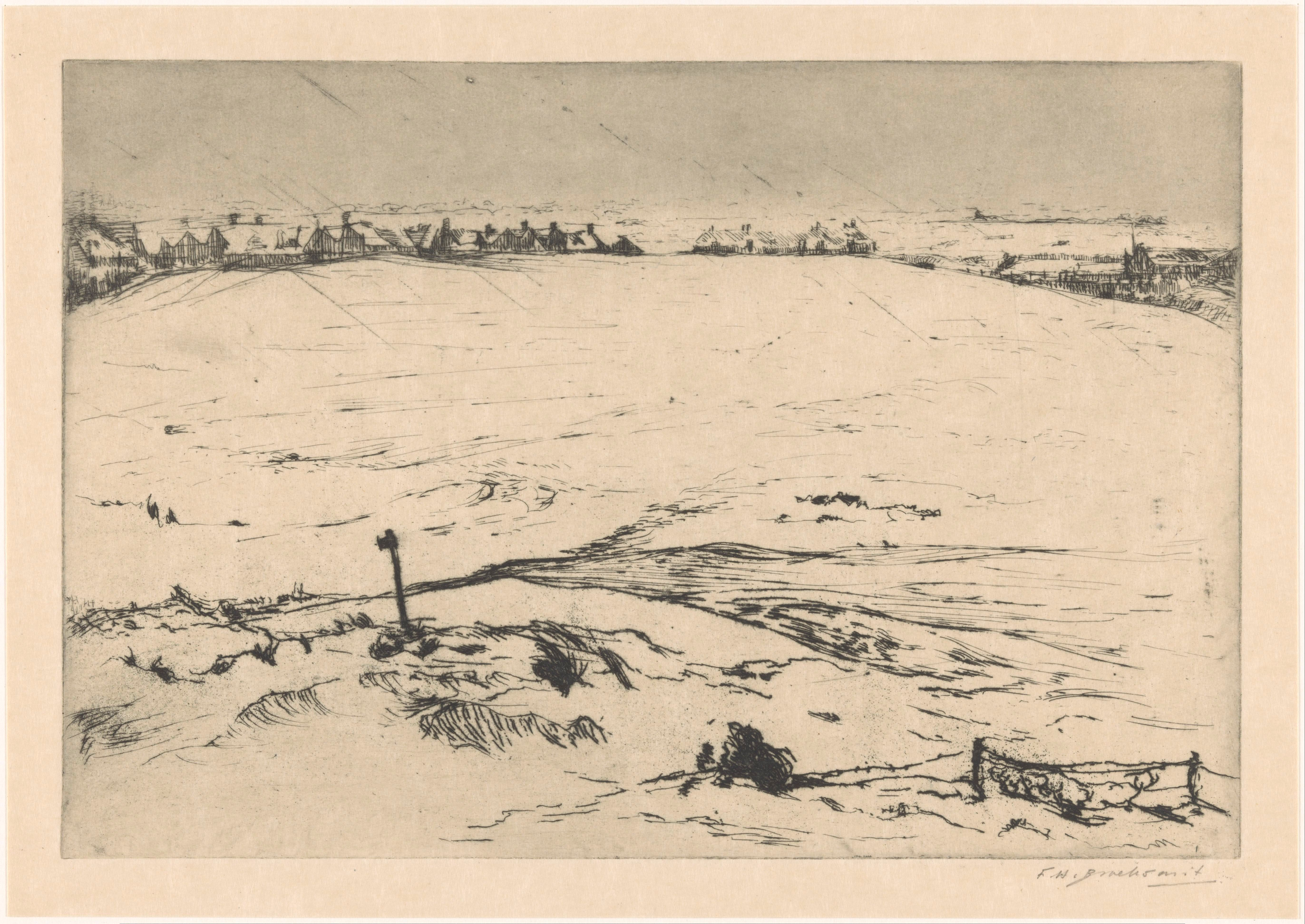
Katwijk aan zee in de winter

Frederika Henriëtte Broeksmit (1875–1945) was a Dutch artist and peace activist.

== Biography ==
Broeksmit was born on 14 August 1875 in Rotterdam. She studied at the Academie voor Beeldende Kunsten (Rotterdam) (Academy of Visual Arts (Rotterdam)), the Rijksakademie van beeldende kunsten (State Academy of Fine Arts), and the Rijksnormaalschool voor Teekenonderwijzers (National Normal School for Drawing Teachers (Amsterdam)). She was a member of De Independents, and Arti et Amicitiae.

Broeksmit exhibited her work at the Brussels International Exhibition of 1910. Broeksmit's work was included in the 1939 exhibition and sale Onze Kunst van Heden (Our Art of Today) at the Rijksmuseum in Amsterdam.

Broeksmit was a pacifist. She founded the organization Si vis Pacem, para Pacem (If you want peace, prepare for Peace). In 1915 she attended the International Congress of Women at the Hague.

Broeksmit died on 25 January 1945 in Bussum.
