= Jacqueline Marguerite van Nie =

Dutch artist

- Born: 6 April 1897; Paris, France
- Died: 7 January 1983 (aged 85); The Hague, Netherlands
- Other names: Jacqueline Marguerite Muller-van Nie
- Known for: Painting
- Spouse(s): H. van Nie, R.J.P. Muller

Jacqueline Marguerite van Nie (1897-1983) was a Dutch artist.

== Biography ==
Van Nie was born on 6 April 1897 in Paris, France. She studied at the Rijksakademie van beeldende kunsten (State Academy of Fine Arts) in Amsterdam. Her teachers included Jan Bronner, Carel Lodewijk Dake sr., Antoon Derkinderen, and Nicolaas van der Waay. Her work was included in the 1939 exhibition and sale Onze Kunst van Heden (Our Art of Today) at the Rijksmuseum in Amsterdam. Van Nie was a member of the Kunstenaarsvereniging Sint Lucas, the Pulchri Studio and the Schilderessenvereniging ODIS.

Van Nie was married twice, first to H. van Nie in 1919, then to R.J.P. Muller in 1952. Van Nie died on 7 January 1983 in The Hague.
