= Leonard Pinkhof =

Dutch artist

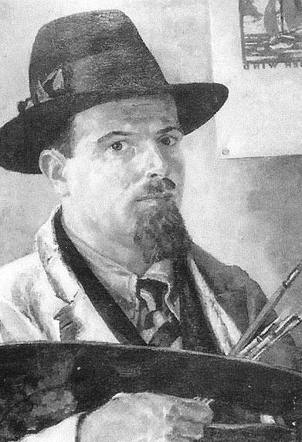
- self portrait
- Born: 19 June 1898; Amsterdam, Netherlands
- Died: 23 July 1943 (aged 45); Sobibor, Poland
- Known for: Painting
- Spouse: Betty Koekoek

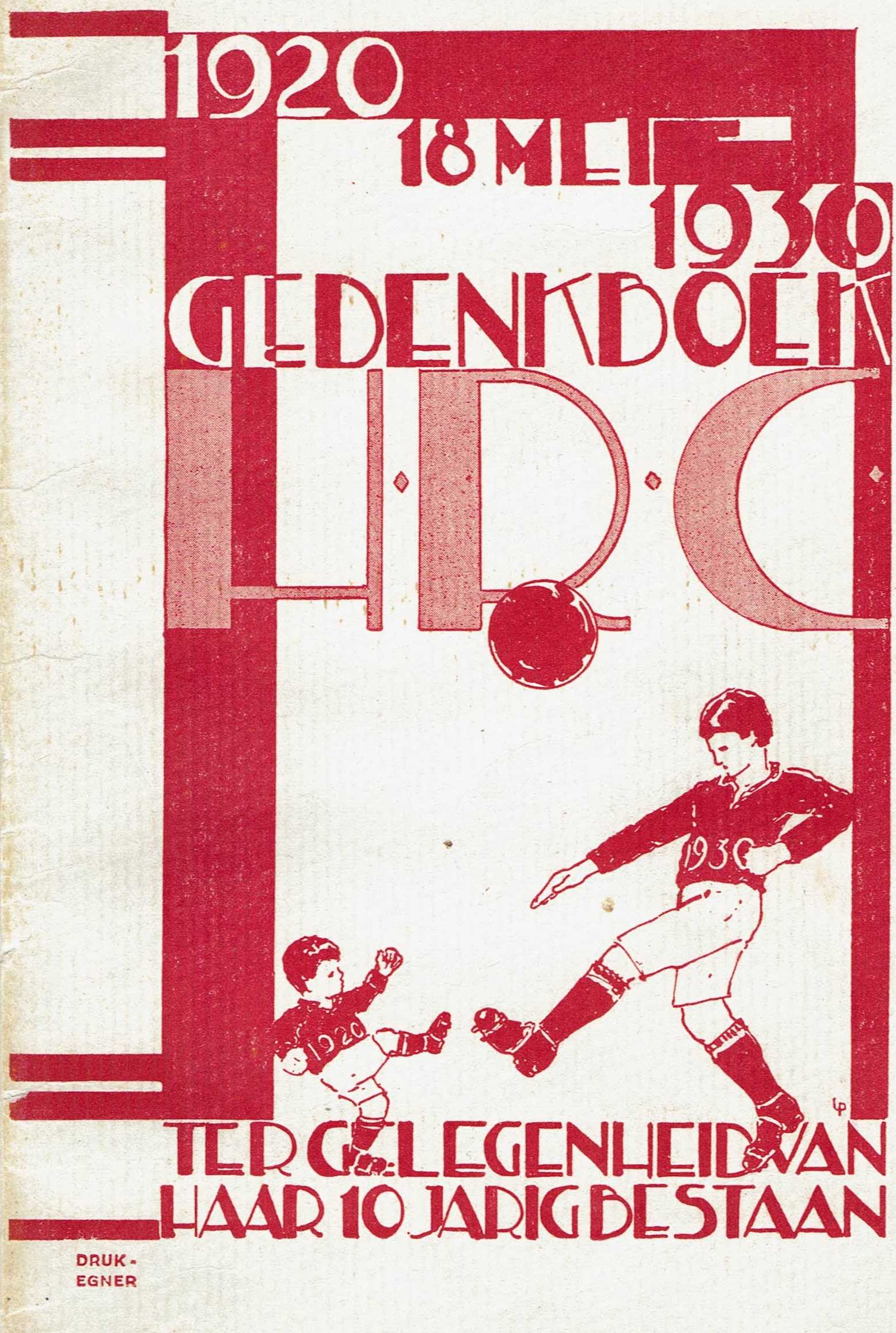
Poster for the Heldersche Racing Club football team (1930) Illustration by Pinkhof

Leonard "Leo" Jehoeda Pinkhof (1898–1943) was a Dutch painter.

== Biography ==
Pinkhof was born on 19 June 1898 in Amsterdam. He studied at the Rijksschool voor Kunstnijverheid Amsterdam (National School for Applied Arts) and the Rijksakademie van beeldende kunsten (State Academy of Fine Arts). His teachers included Johannes Josephus Aarts, Willem Retera, and Nicolaas van der Waay. He settled in Den Helder where he taught technical drawing at the Ambachtsschool (Craft School). In 1927 Pinkhof married Betty Koekoek with whom he had four children. His work was included in the 1939 exhibition and sale Onze Kunst van Heden (Our Art of Today) at the Rijksmuseum in Amsterdam. Pinkhof was a member of De Onafhankelijken (The Independents).

In 1940, at the beginning of World War II, Pinkhof lost his job because Jews were no longer allowed to work for non-Jewish institutions. Additionally, the Germans took his house and the family was forced to leave Den Helder. The family was briefly in Oudesluis, then in 1941 in Amsterdam. In 1943 they were taken to the Westerbork transit camp and then to the Sobibor extermination camp in Poland where they were murdered.

Pinkhof died on 23 July 1943 at the age of 45.

== Legacy ==
In 1990 an exhibition Leo Pinkhof: Joods kunstenaar in Den Helder (Leo Pinkhof: Jewish artist in Den Helder) was held at the Nationaal Reddingsmuseum Dorus Rijkers and the Synagogecomplex Folkingestraat. In 2017 a commemorative plaque was placed on the wall of Pinkhof's former home at 7 Soembastraat in Den Helder.
