= Stien Eelsingh =

Dutch artist

- Eelsingh c. 1938
- Born: Christiana Eelsingh; 1 September 1903; Zwolle, Netherlands
- Died: 18 June 1964 (aged 60); Meppel, Netherlands
- Known for: Painting

Stien Eelsingh (1903–1964) was a Dutch painter.

== Biography ==
Eelsingh was born on 1 September 1903 in Zwolle. She studied with Henk Meijer (kunstenaar). Eelsingh was a member of De Brug, De Ploeg, and the Kunstenaarsvereniging Sint Lucas. She was the recipient of the Koninklijke subsidie voor vrije schilderkunst (Royal grant for free painting). Her work was included in the 1939 exhibition and sale Onze Kunst van Heden (Our Art of Today) at the Rijksmuseum in Amsterdam.

Eelsingh died on 18 June 1964 in Meppel.
