= Jan Kleintjes =

Dutch painter

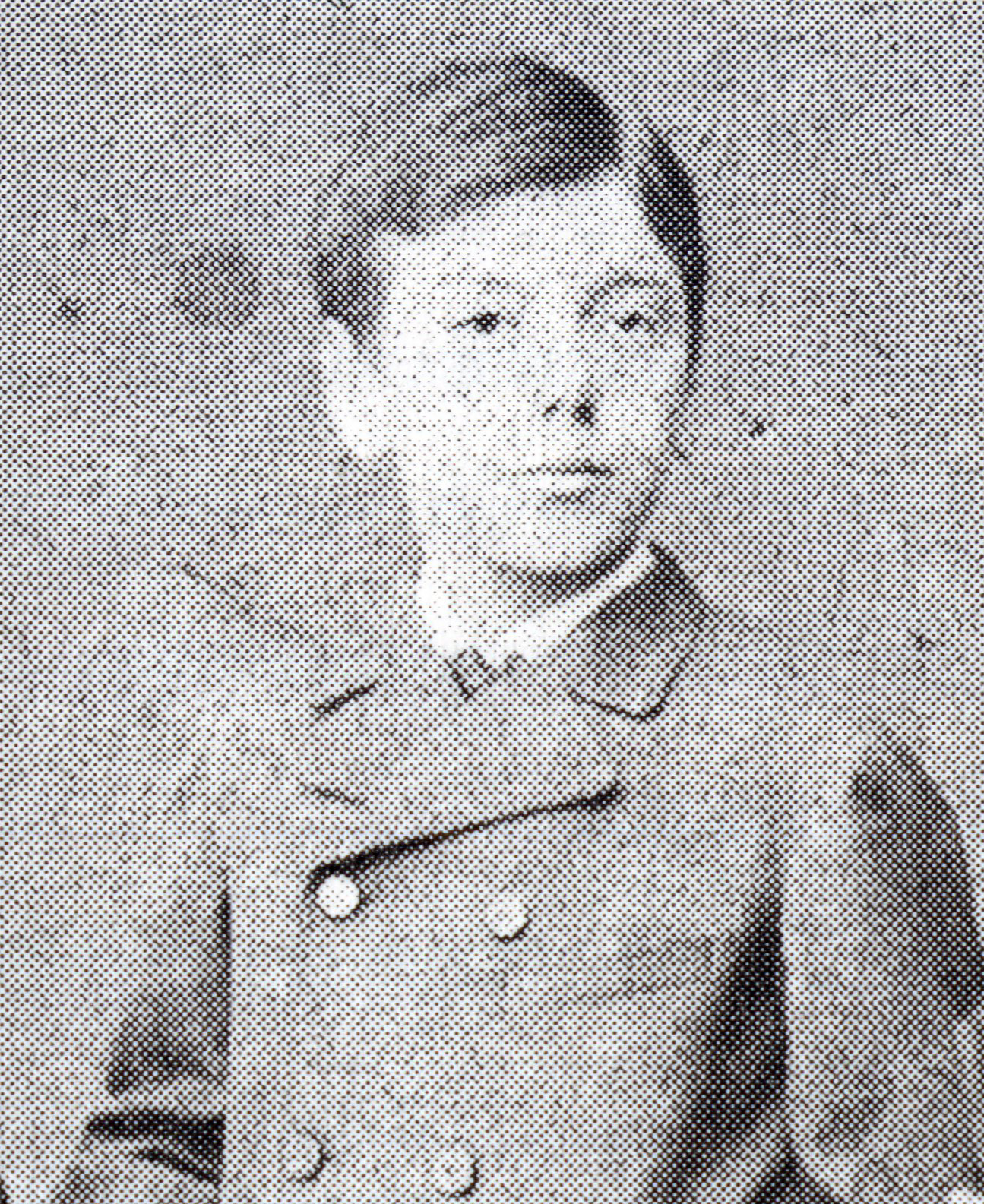
- Born: 24 May 1872; Rotterdam, Netherlands
- Died: 2 May 1955 (aged 82); Heerde, Netherlands
- Occupation: Painter

Jan Kleintjes (24 May 1872 – 2 May 1955) was a Dutch painter. His work was part of the art competitions at the 1928 Summer Olympics and the 1936 Summer Olympics. Kleintjes' work was included in the 1939 exhibition and sale Onze Kunst van Heden (Our Art of Today) at the Rijksmuseum in Amsterdam.
