= Tjipke Visser =

Dutch sculptor (1876–1955)

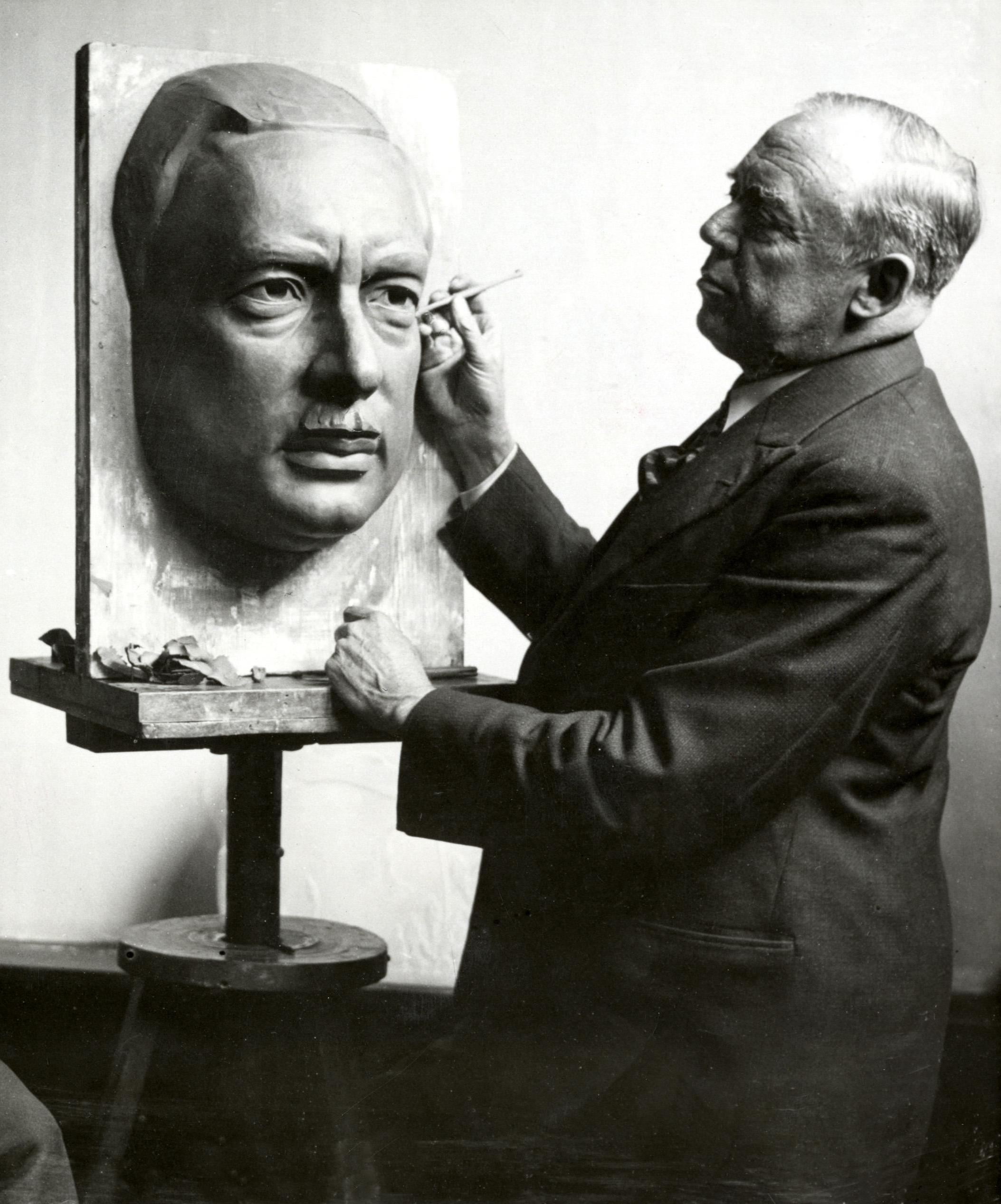
- Tjipke Visser in 1937
- Born: 12 December 1876; Workum, Netherlands
- Died: 22 January 1955 (aged 78); Bergen, Netherlands
- Occupation: Sculptor

Tjipke Visser (12 December 1876 – 22 January 1955) was a Dutch sculptor. His work was part of the sculpture event in the art competition at the 1936 Summer Olympics. Visser's work was included in the 1939 exhibition and sale Onze Kunst van Heden (Our Art of Today) at the Rijksmuseum in Amsterdam.
