= Tula Marina di Vista =

Dutch artist

- Born: Luisa Suzanna Kamerman; 26 April 1888; Caconda, Huíla, Angola
- Died: 10 November 1969 (aged 81); Hilversum, Netherlands
- Known for: Painting, Writing

Tula Marina di Vista (1888-1969) was the pseudonym for Luisa Suzanna Kamerman, a Dutch artist and writer.

== Biography ==
Tula Marina di Vista was born on 26 April 1888 in Caconda, Angola which was then a colony of Portugal. In 1913 she married the artist Dirk Smorenberg and the couple divorced in 1923. Later she lived with Johan Schmidt. Her work was included in the 1939 exhibition and sale Onze Kunst van Heden (Our Art of Today) at the Rijksmuseum in Amsterdam. She was a member of Kunstenaarsvereniging Sint Lucas, De Onafhankelijken, Kunstenaarsvereniging Laren-Blaricum, and Arti et Industriae.

Tula Marina di Vista died on 10 November 1969 in Hilversum.
