= Tilly Münninghoff-van Vliet =

Dutch artist (1879–1960)

- Tilly Münninghoff-van Vliet and Xeno Münninghoff around the time of their marriage
- Born: Mathilda Jacoba van Vliet; 27 November 1879; Amsterdam, Netherlands
- Died: 29 December 1960 (aged 81); Oosterbeek, Netherlands
- Known for: Painting
- Spouse: Xeno Münninghoff (m. 1906; died 1944)

Tilly Münninghoff-Van Vliet (1879–1960) was a Dutch artist.

== Biography ==
Tilly Münninghoff-van Vliet (née van Vliet) was born on 27 November 1879 in Amsterdam. She attended the Koninklijke Academie van Beeldende Kunsten (Royal Academy of Art, The Hague). Her teachers included Frits Jansen and Jan Antonius van Schooten. In 1906 she married the artist Xeno Münninghoff (1873-1944). The couple settled in Oosterbeek where Münninghoff was a teacher at the local drawing school. They often exhibited together. In 1944 their house was badly damaged during the Battle of Arnhem, and much of their work was destroyed. Münninghoff died soon after.

Münninghoff-van Vliet's work was included in the 1939 exhibition and sale Onze Kunst van Heden (lit. 'Our Art of Today') at the Rijksmuseum in Amsterdam. She was a member of Kunstenaarsvereniging Sint Lucas, Artibus Sacrum, Rhijn-Ouwe, and Punt '69.

Münninghoff-van Vliet died on 29 December 1960 in Oosterbeek.
