= Annie Bruin =

Dutch artist (1870–1961)

- Born: 24 September 1870; Zaandijk, The Netherlands
- Died: 24 June 1961 (aged 90); Blaricum, The Netherlands
- Known for: Painting

Anna Martha Elizabeth Bruin (1870–1961) was a Dutch painter known for her landscapes.

== Biography ==
Bruin was born on 24 September 1870 in Zaandijk. She studied at the Rijksnormaalschool voor Teekenonderwijzers (Amsterdam) National Normal School for Drawing Teachers (Amsterdam). Her instructors included Jan Derk Huibers and Johannes Leendert Vleming. She was a member of Vereeniging voor Beeldende Kunsten Laren-Blaricum (Artist association Laren-Blaricum). Bruin's work was included in the 1939 exhibition and sale Onze Kunst van Heden (Our Art of Today) at the Rijksmuseum in Amsterdam.

Bruin died on 24 June 1961 in Blaricum.
