= Nel Kluitman =

Dutch artist

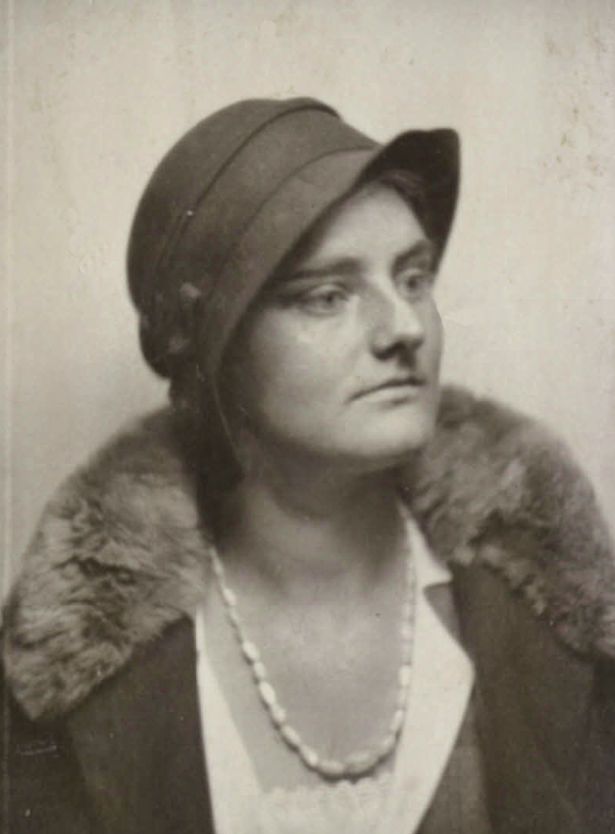
- Born: Petronella Johanna Marie Kluitman; 7 May 1906; Alkmaar, Netherlands
- Died: 3 June 1990 (aged 84); Hilversum, Netherlands
- Known for: Painting, Sculpture

Petronella "Nel" Johanna Marie Kluitman (1879-1961) was a Dutch artist.

== Biography ==
Kluitman was born on 3 October 1879 in Alkmaar. She was a member of De Independents (The Independents) and the Vereniging van Beeldende Kunstenaars Hilversum (Association of Visual Artists Hilversum). Her work was included in the 1939 exhibition and sale Onze Kunst van Heden (Our Art of Today) at the Rijksmuseum in Amsterdam. Kluitman died on 3 June 1990 in Hilversum.
