= Antoinette van Hoytema =

Dutch artist

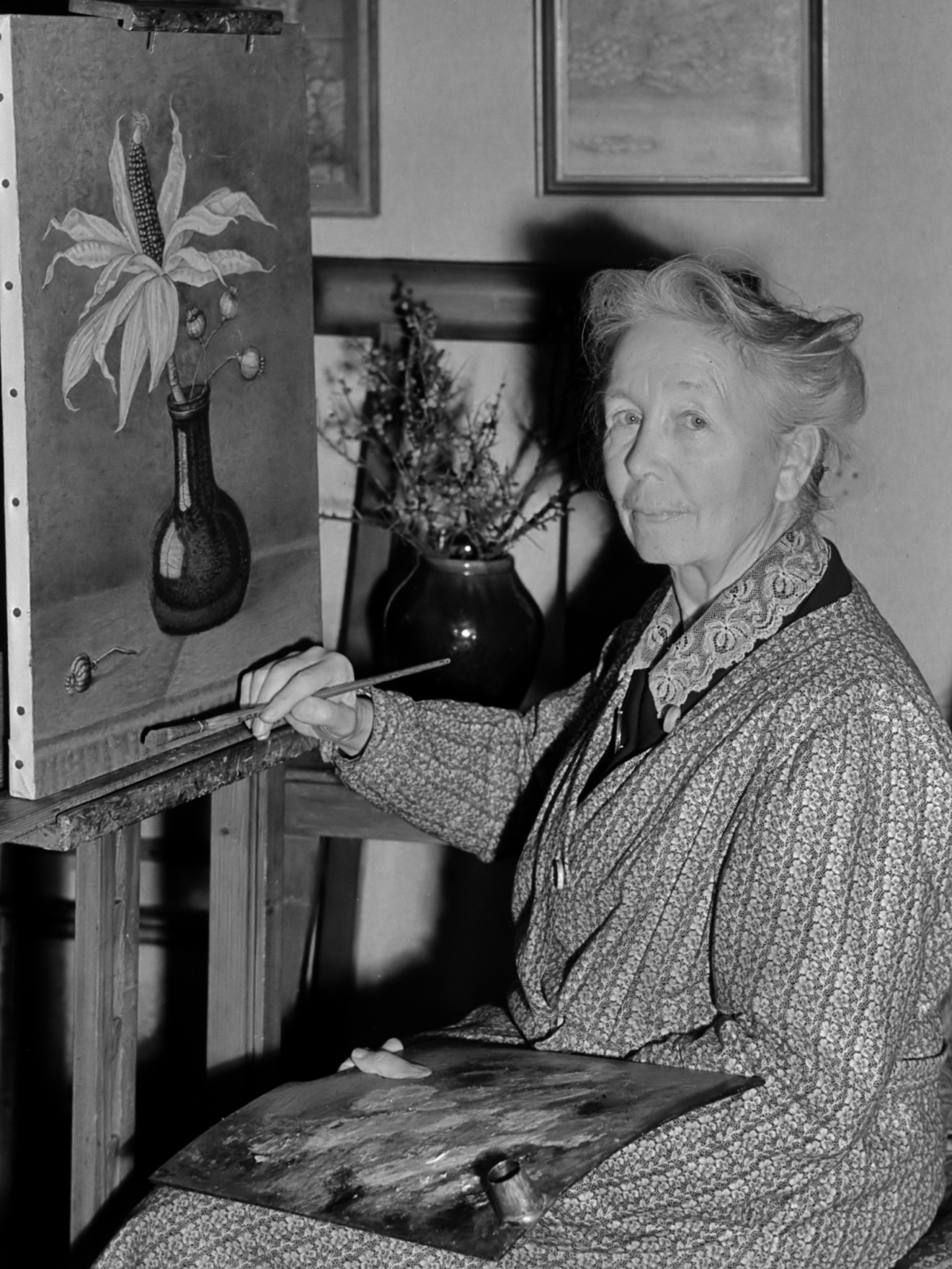
- Born: Antoinette Agatha van Hoytema; 6 December 1875; Delft, Netherlands
- Died: 30 September 1967 (aged 91); The Hague, Netherlands
- Other name: Antoinette van Hoijtema
- Known for: Painting

Antoinette van Hoytema (1875-1967) was a Dutch painter.

== Biography ==
Hoytema was born on 6 December 1875 in Delft. She studied with Henk Bremmer. She was a member of the Federatie van Verenigingen van Beroeps Beeldende Kunstenaars (Amsterdam), Schilderessenvereniging ODIS, and 'Kunstenaarsvereniging De Onafhankelijken. Hoytema's work was included in the 1939 exhibition and sale Onze Kunst van Heden (Our Art of Today) at the Rijksmuseum in Amsterdam.

Hoytema died on 30 September 1967 in The Hague.
