= Roeloffina van Heteren-Vink =

Dutch artist

- Born: Roeloffina Vink; 1 April 1875; Utrecht, Netherlands
- Died: 3 January 1971 (aged 95); The Hague, Netherlands
- Other names: Roeloffina van Heteren
- Known for: Painting

Roeloffina van Heteren-Vink (1875-1971) was a Dutch artist.

== Biography ==
Van Heteren-Vink née Vink was born on 1 April 1875 in Utrecht. She studied with Johannes Gabrielse, Sárika Goth and Gé Röling. She was married to W.J. van Heteren. Her work was included in the 1939 exhibition and sale Onze Kunst van Heden (Our Art of Today) at the Rijksmuseum in Amsterdam. She was a member of the Genootschap Kunstliefde in Utrecht.

Van Heteren-Vink died on 3 January 1971 in The Hague.
