= Judy Michiels van Kessenich =

Dutch artist (1901–1972)

- Born: Juliana Cecilia Paulina Michiels van Kessenich; 21 April 1901; Roermond, Netherlands
- Died: 17 May 1972 (aged 71); The Hague, Netherlands
- Other names: Judy van Wijnbergen-Michiels van Kessenich
- Known for: Painting
- Spouse: Sweder Ferdinandus Antonius Canisius Maria van Wijnbergen

Juliana "Judy" Cecilia Paulina Michiels van Kessenich (1901-1972) was a Dutch artist.

== Biography ==
Kessenich was born on 21 April 1901 in Roermond. Her teachers included Georges Baltus and André Lhote. She traveled throughout Europe including Austria, Brussels, France, and Germany. Kessenich married the politician Sweder Ferdinandus Antonius Canisius Maria van Wijnbergen. Kessenich's work was included in the 1939 exhibition and sale Onze Kunst van Heden (Our Art of Today) at the Rijksmuseum in Amsterdam. She was a member of the Vereeniging Haagsche Kunstkring and the Pulchri Studio.

Kessenich died on 17 May 1972 in The Hague.
