= Felix Hess =

Dutch painter

- Born: 20 June 1878; Amsterdam, Netherlands
- Died: 9 April 1943 (aged 64); Sobibor, Poland

Felix Hess (20 June 1878 – 9 April 1943) was a Dutch painter. He studied at Rijksakademie van beeldende kunsten in Amsterdam. His teachers included Pieter Dupont. He was a member of Arti et Amicitiae and Kunstenaarsvereniging Sint Lucas. His work was part of the painting event in the art competition at the 1928 Summer Olympics. His work was included in the 1939 exhibition and sale Onze Kunst van Heden (Our Art of Today) at the Rijksmuseum in Amsterdam.

Hess was killed in the Sobibor extermination camp during World War II.
