= Sara Ledeboer =

Dutch artist

- Born: 20 August 1867; Rotterdam, Netherlands
- Died: 21 February 1952 (aged 84); Rotterdam, Netherlands
- Other names: Sara Heijberg-Ledeboer
- Known for: Painting
- Spouse: Johannes Gerardus Heijberg

Sara Ledeboer (1867-1952) was a Dutch painter.

== Biography ==
Ledeboer was born on 20 August 1867 in Rotterdam. She was mainly self-taught but also attended the Academie voor Beeldende Kunsten (Rotterdam) (Academy of Visual Arts), and the Rijksakademie van beeldende kunsten (State Academy of Fine Arts) in Amsterdam. In 1892 Ledeboer married fellow artist Johannes Gerardus Heijberg (1869-1952).

Ledeboer's work was included in the 1939 exhibition and sale Onze Kunst van Heden (Our Art of Today) at the Rijksmuseum in Amsterdam. She was a member of De Rotterdamsche Tien, and Kunstenaarsvereniging Sint Lucas.

Ledeboer died on 21 February 1952 in Rotterdam.
