= Jaap Weyand =

Dutch painter

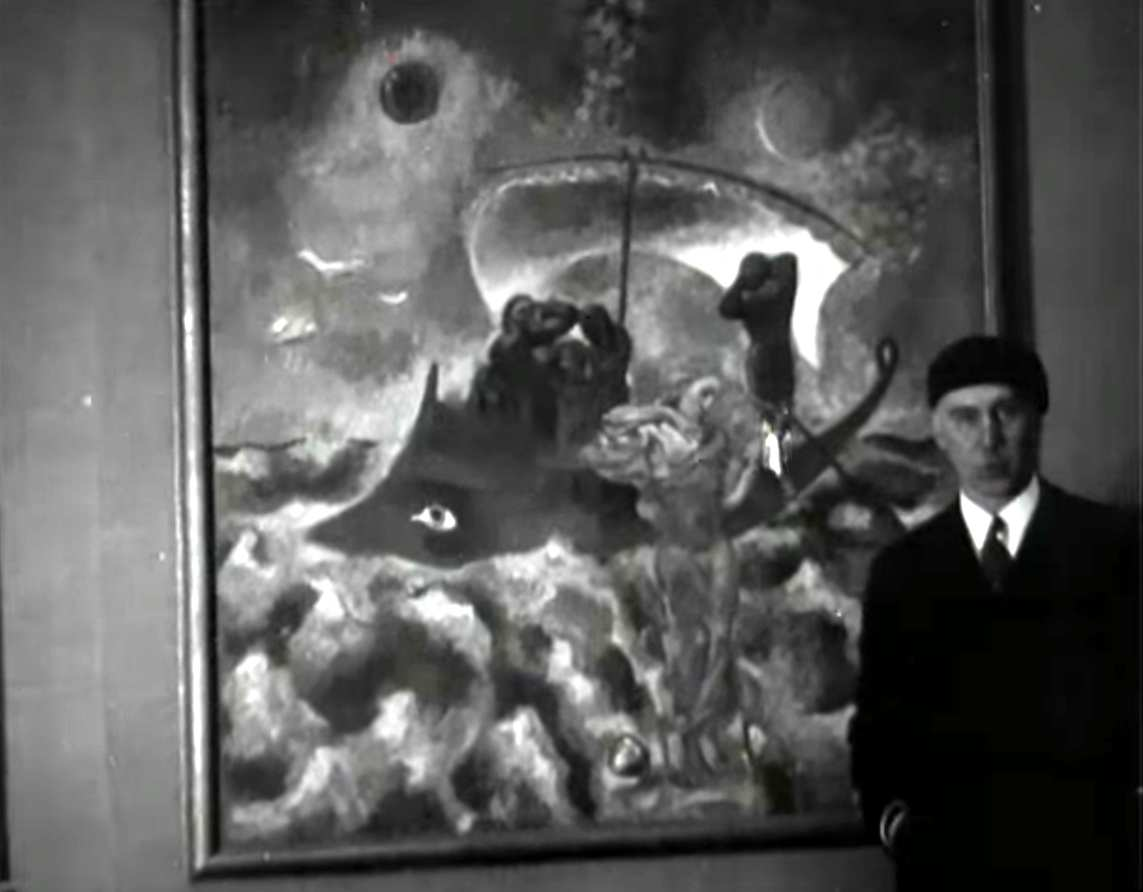
- Born: 8 March 1886; Amsterdam, Netherlands
- Died: 23 November 1960 (aged 74); Bakkum, Netherlands
- Occupation: Painter

Jaap Weyand (8 March 1886 – 23 November 1960, sometimes spelled as Weijand) was a Dutch painter. His work was part of the art competitions at the 1928 Summer Olympics and the 1932 Summer Olympics. Weyand's work was included in the 1939 exhibition and sale Onze Kunst van Heden (Our Art of Today) at the Rijksmuseum in Amsterdam.

Weyand was born in 1886 in Amsterdam and studied at Rijksakademie van beeldende kunsten, also in Amsterdam, between 1904 and 1910.
