= Olga van Iterson-Knoepfle =

Dutch artist

- Born: Olga Knöpfle; 3 October 1879; Überlingen, Germany
- Died: 6 December 1961 (aged 82); Leiden, Netherlands
- Known for: Painting

Olga van Iterson-Knoepfle (1879-1961) was a Dutch artist.

== Biography ==
Iterson-Knoepfle née Knoepfle was born on 3 October 1879 in Überlingen, Germany. She studied at the Arts and Crafts School in London, and the Hoger Instituut voor Schone Kunsten (Higher Institute for Fine Arts) in Antwerp. She studied with Isidore Opsomer. She was a member of the Arti et Amicitiae and Kunstenaarsvereniging Sint Lucas. She was married to Constant Johann Adrian van Iterson.

Her work was included in the 1939 exhibition and sale Onze Kunst van Heden (Our Art of Today) at the Rijksmuseum in Amsterdam. In 1940 she was awarded the "gold medal of Queen Wilhelmina" at the Arti exhibition. It was the last year it was awarded. Iterson-Knoepfle was a member of the nationalist, fascist, and antisemitic political organization the National Socialist Movement in the Netherlands. Iterson-Knoepfle taught at the drawing academy Ars Aemula Natura in Leiden. Her students included Frans van den Berg and Herman de Voogd

Iterson-Knoepfle died on 6 December 1961 in Leiden.
