= Piet van Egmond =

Dutch painter

- Born: 31 August 1889; Alkemade, Netherlands
- Died: 11 January 1965 (aged 75); Haarlem, Netherlands
- Occupation: Painter

Piet van Egmond (31 August 1889 – 11 January 1965) was a Dutch painter. His work was part of the painting event in the art competition at the 1936 Summer Olympics. His work was included in the 1939 exhibition and sale Onze Kunst van Heden (Our Art of Today) at the Rijksmuseum in Amsterdam.
