= Coen van Oven =

Dutch artist (1883–1963)

- Born: 21 September 1883; Dordrecht, Netherlands
- Died: 4 May 1963 (aged 79); Amsterdam, Netherlands
- Known for: Painting

Conrad Theodor, or Coen van Oven (21 September 1883 – 4 May 1963), was a Dutch painter.

== Biography ==
According to the RKD he was born in Dordrecht and in 1903 he became a member of the drawing academy in Antwerp. The following year he was a member of the drawing academy in Brussels. In the winters he took lessons from the painter Jan Veth in Bussum. In 1905 he was a pupil of Roland Larij, the chairman of the drawing academy in Dordrecht (Pictura) and in 1906 he became a pupil of the German architect Adolph Meyer in Berlin for two years. van Oven's work was included in the 1939 exhibition and sale Onze Kunst van Heden (Our Art of Today) at the Rijksmuseum in Amsterdam.

He is known for his characteristic portraits of family members and landscapes. In 1913 he moved to Amsterdam, where he stayed except for a short period in South Africa after the war where he visited Kimberley and Pretoria during the years 1947-1949. He was a member of Arti et Amicitiae and the group called De Onafhankelijken.
