= Cornelis Mension =

Dutch painter

Cornelis Jan Mension
- Born: 11 March 1882; Delft, Netherlands
- Died: 2 May 1950 (aged 68); Delft, Netherlands
- Occupation: Painter

Cornelis Mension (11 March 1882 – 2 May 1950) was a Dutch painter. His work was part of the painting event in the art competition at the 1932 Summer Olympics. Mension's work was included in the 1939 exhibition and sale Onze Kunst van Heden (Our Art of Today) at the Rijksmuseum in Amsterdam.
