= Aafjes =

Aafjes is a relatively rare Dutch surname. It is probably matronymic ("child of Aafje") and may have originated in the Zaanstreek. Aafjes may refer to:

- Bertus Aafjes (1914–1993), Dutch poet
- Gerard Aafjes (born 1985), Dutch football player
- Sijtje Aafjes (1893–1972), Dutch painter, draftswoman, and illustrator
