= Hubert Levigne =

Dutch painter

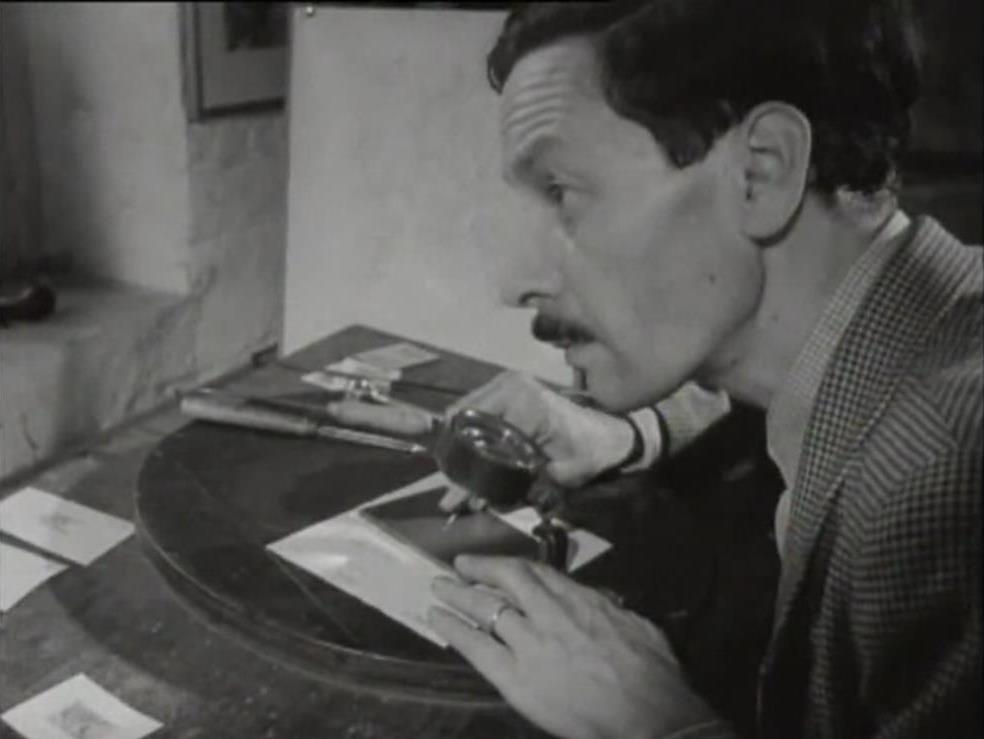
- Born: 30 September 1905; Meerssen, Netherlands
- Died: 29 December 1989 (aged 84); Sittard, Netherlands
- Education: Stadsteekeninstituut in Maastricht and Rijksakademie van beeldende kunsten in Amsterdam
- Known for: Graphic artist, glazier

Nicolaas Jozef Hubertus (Hubert or Huub) Levigne (30 September 1905 – 29 December 1989) was a Dutch graphic artist, glazier and professor.

== Life and work ==
Hubert or Huub Levigne was a son of Nicolas Joseph Levigne and Elisabeth Ramakers. He grew up in Maastricht and took drawing and painting lessons from Henri Jonas at the Stadsteekeninstituut in Maastricht. He then left for Amsterdam to study at the Rijksakademie van beeldende kunsten (1928–1932), where he was taught by Jan Aarts (graphics) and Rik Roland Holst (monumental art).

Levigne was a member of the Bende van De Suisse, a group of painters, architects, poets, writers and other culture enthusiasts who spent many evenings in the Café Suisse on the Vrijthof in Maastricht in the 1920s (just like the members of the Limburgse Kunstkring). He also joined the Nederlandsche Vereeniging voor Ambachts- en Nijverheidskunst.

After completing his training in Amsterdam in 1933 and after winning the silver medal at the Prix de Rome, he returned to Maastricht. In addition to his own free work, he also carried out commissions for postage stamps, occasional graphics, ex libris and ecclesiastical art. Levigne worked with copper engravings, etchings, woodcuts and with a combination of etchings and aquatint. He also painted and made monumental work such as tile pictures and stained glass. Levigne was a pupil of Roland Holst, but his glassware mainly shows the influence of the Limburg glaziers.

In 1950 Levigne, Jos ten Horn and Frits Peutz were appointed professors at the Jan van Eyck Academy. Ten Horn taught monumental painting and glazing, Peutz taught architecture and Levigne taught graphic design. He held this position until his retirement in 1972. After this he lived in Spain for a few years and then again until his death in Limburg.

== Works ==
Levigne designs

- Stained glass windows (1942–1950) for the Sint-Monulphus en Gondulphuskerk in Berg
- Stained glass (1948) for the Johannes de Doperkerk in Katwijk aan den Rijn
- Stained glass (1948) for the H.H. Nicolaas en Barbarakerk in Valkenburg
- Stained glass windows (1948–1951) for the Sint-Petrus' Bandenkerk in Heer
- Two memorial windows of the Limburg evacuees (1949) in front of the provinciehuis in Leeuwarden
- War memorial (plaque) in the Employment Office in Leeuwarden
- Twelve stained glass windows (1950, 1964) for the Sint-Nicolaaskerk in Schalkhaar
- Six stained glass windows (1951–1952) for the chapel of the college of the Montfortians in Schimmert
- War memorial (1951) in the town hall in Bocholtz
- Stained glass (1952) for the Sint-Dionysiuskerk in Asselt
- Three stained glass windows (1954) for the Maria Gorettikerk in Kerkrade
- Tile mosaic (1956?) in Sphinxkantoor, Maastricht
- Stained glass (1965) for the Heilige Geestkerk in Amstelveen
- Tile pictures (1938?) for Klooster Dolphia (Enschede-Glanerbrug)

== Gallery ==
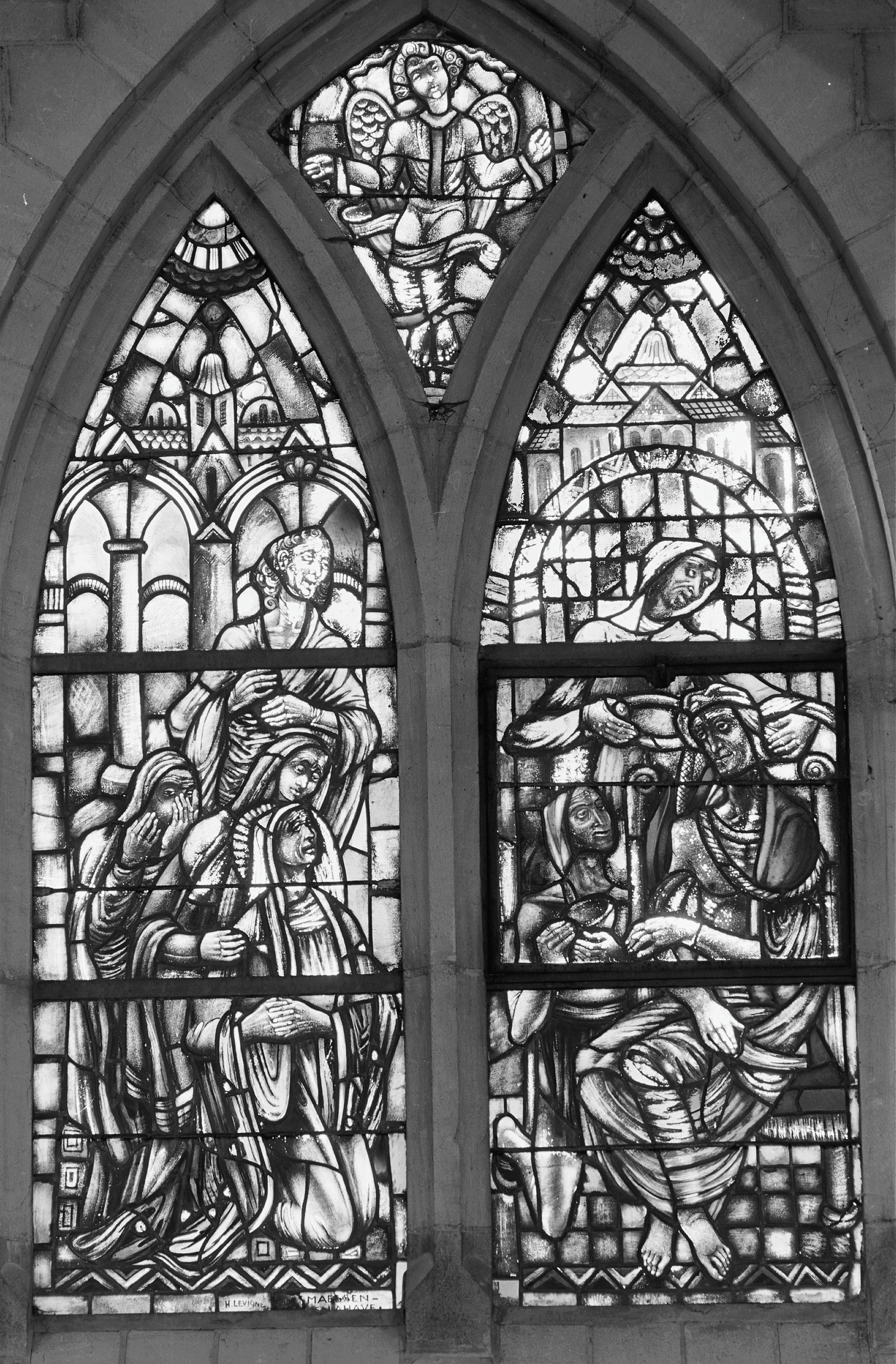
Sint-Monulphus en Gondulphuskerk, Berg

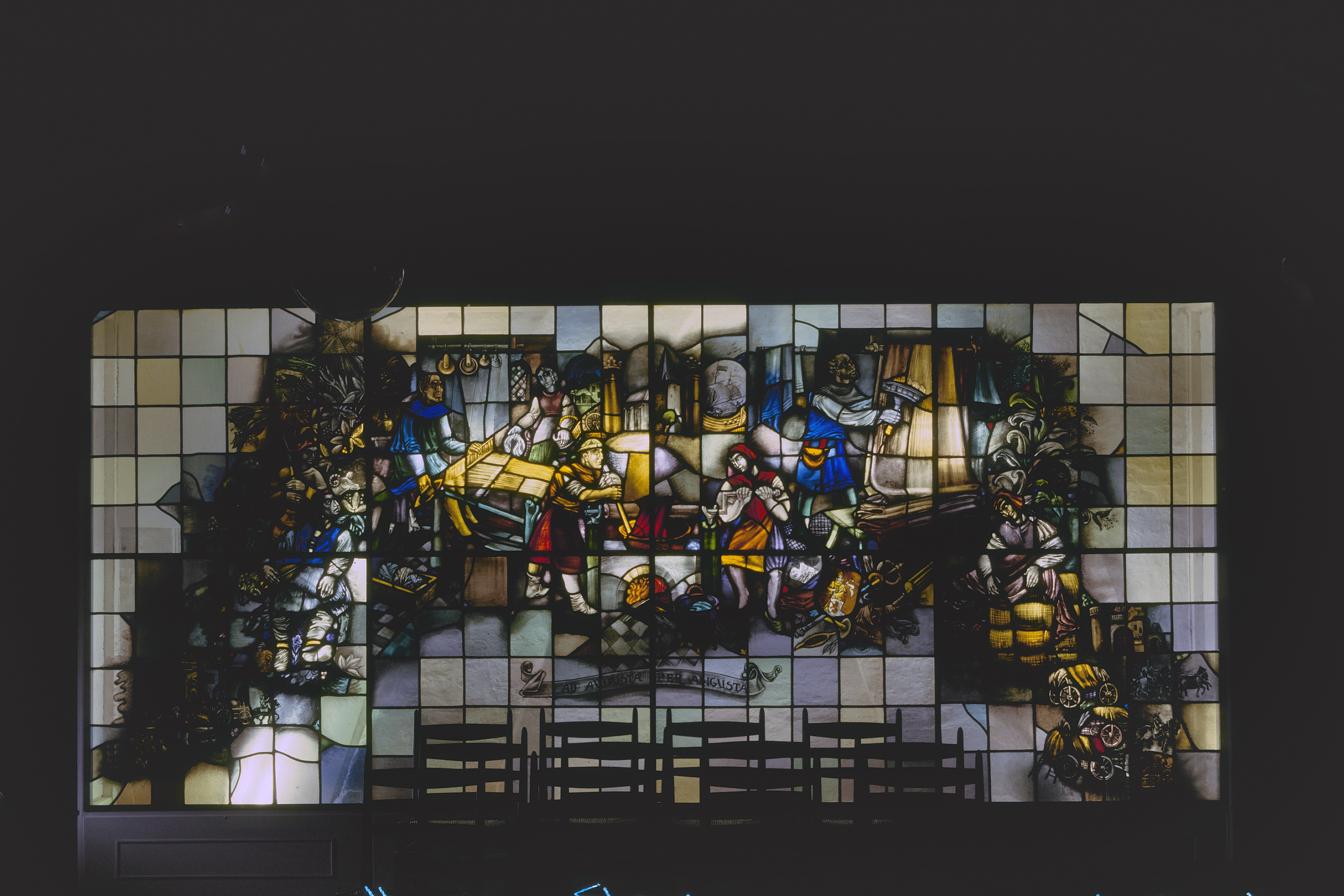
Stained glass window in the town hall of Vaals

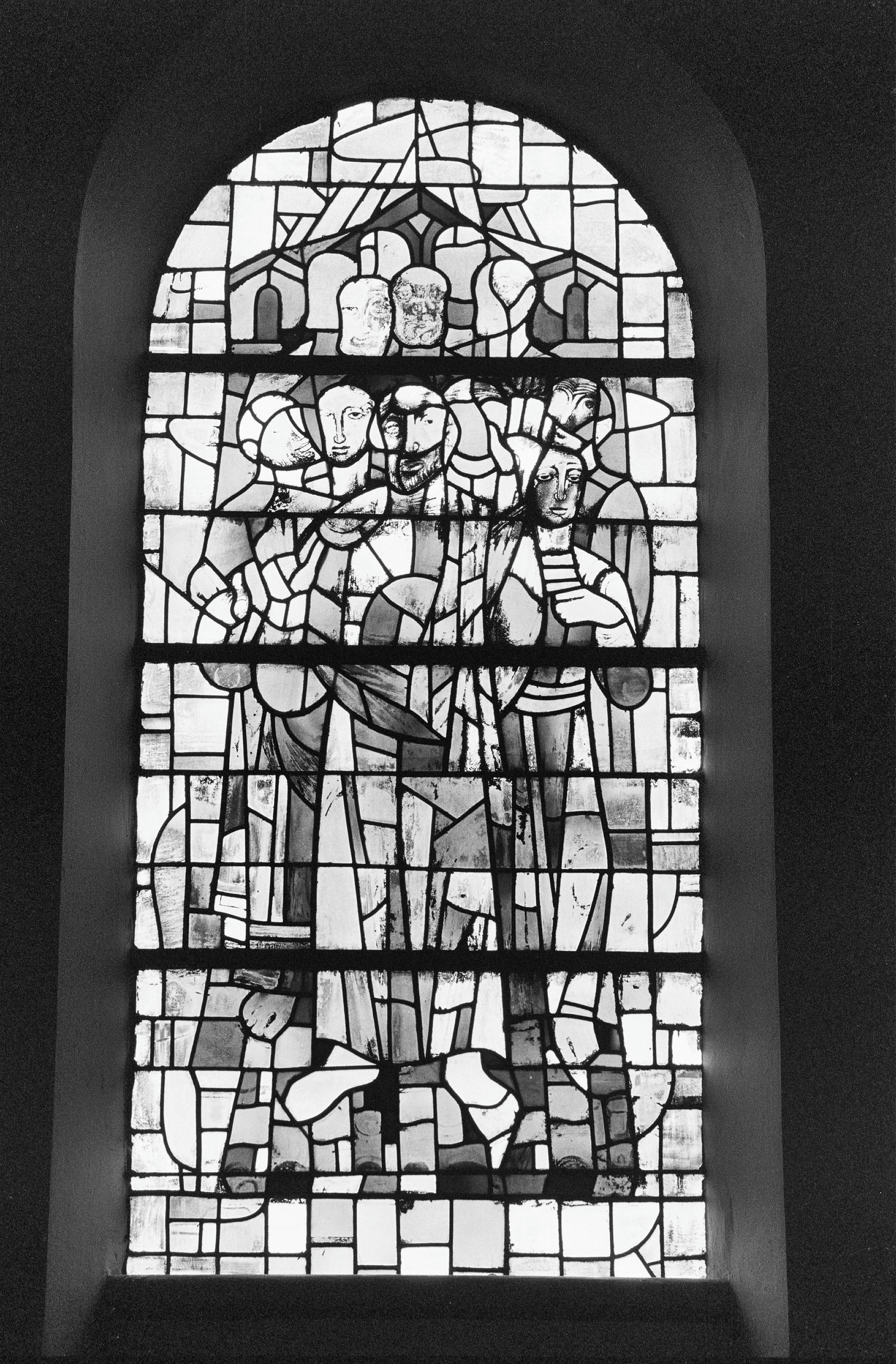
Sint-Petrus' Bandenkerk, Heer

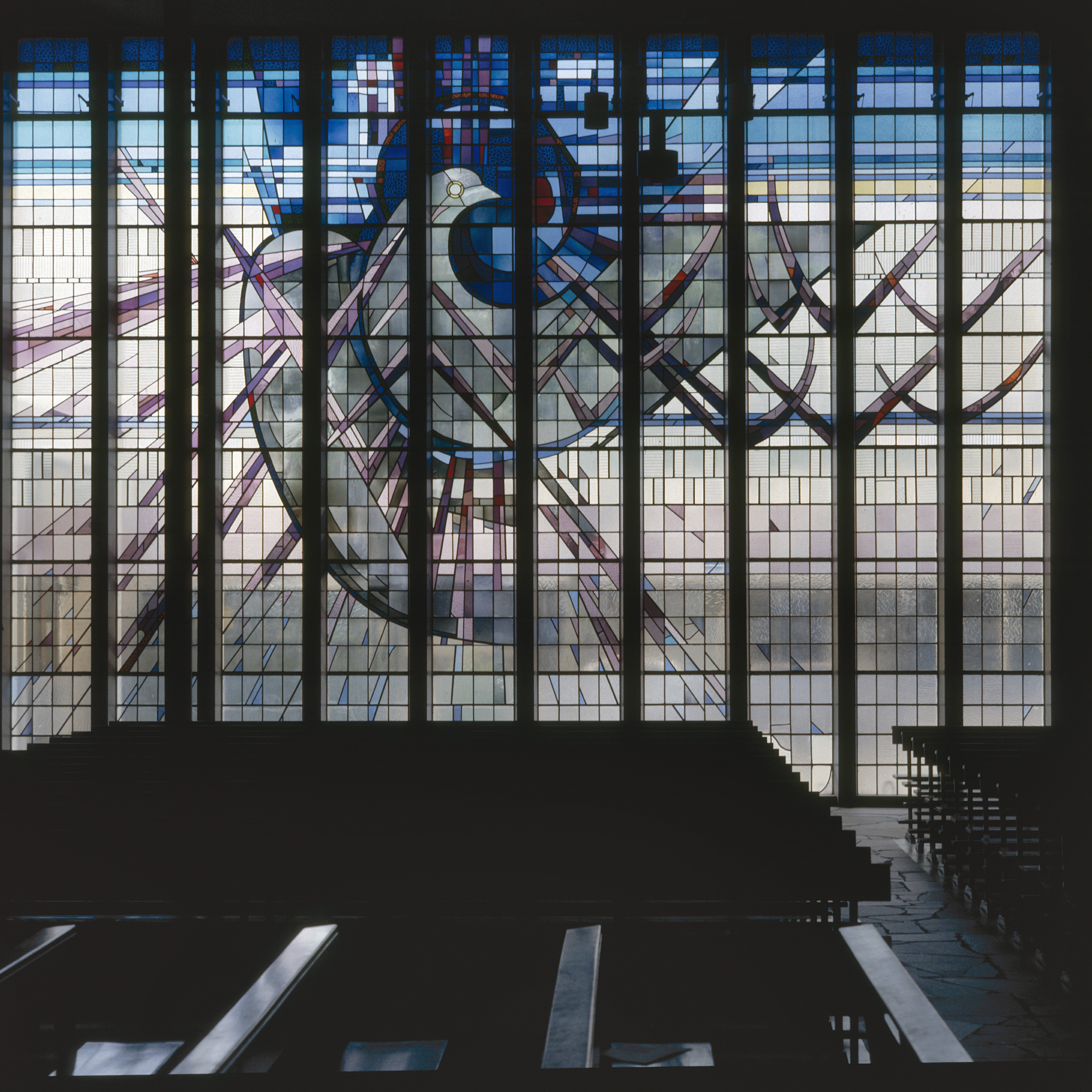
Heilige Geestkerk, Amstelveen
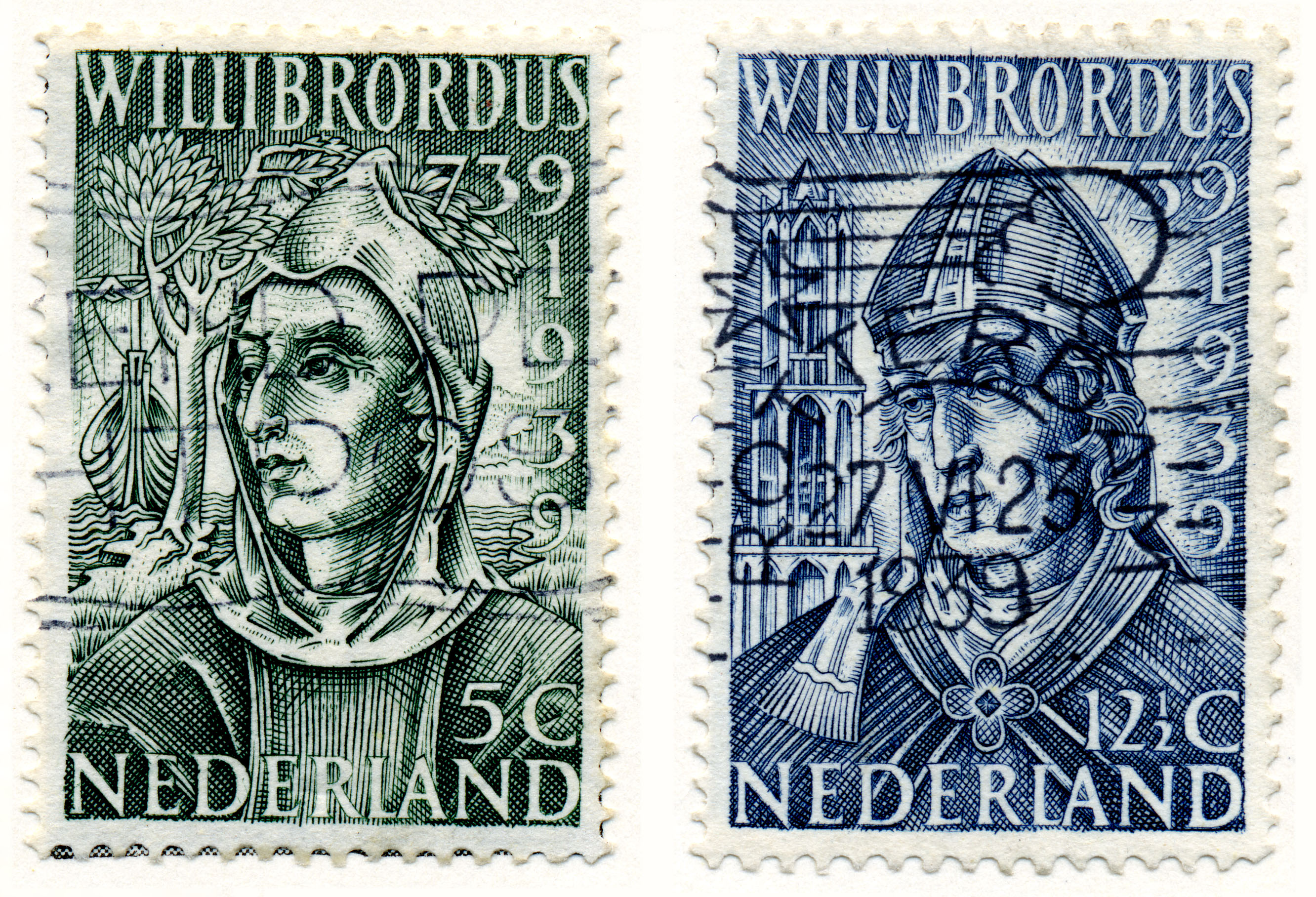
Postage stamp issued from 15 June to 15 September 1939 to commemorate 1200 years since the death of Willibrord, the apostle of the Netherlands

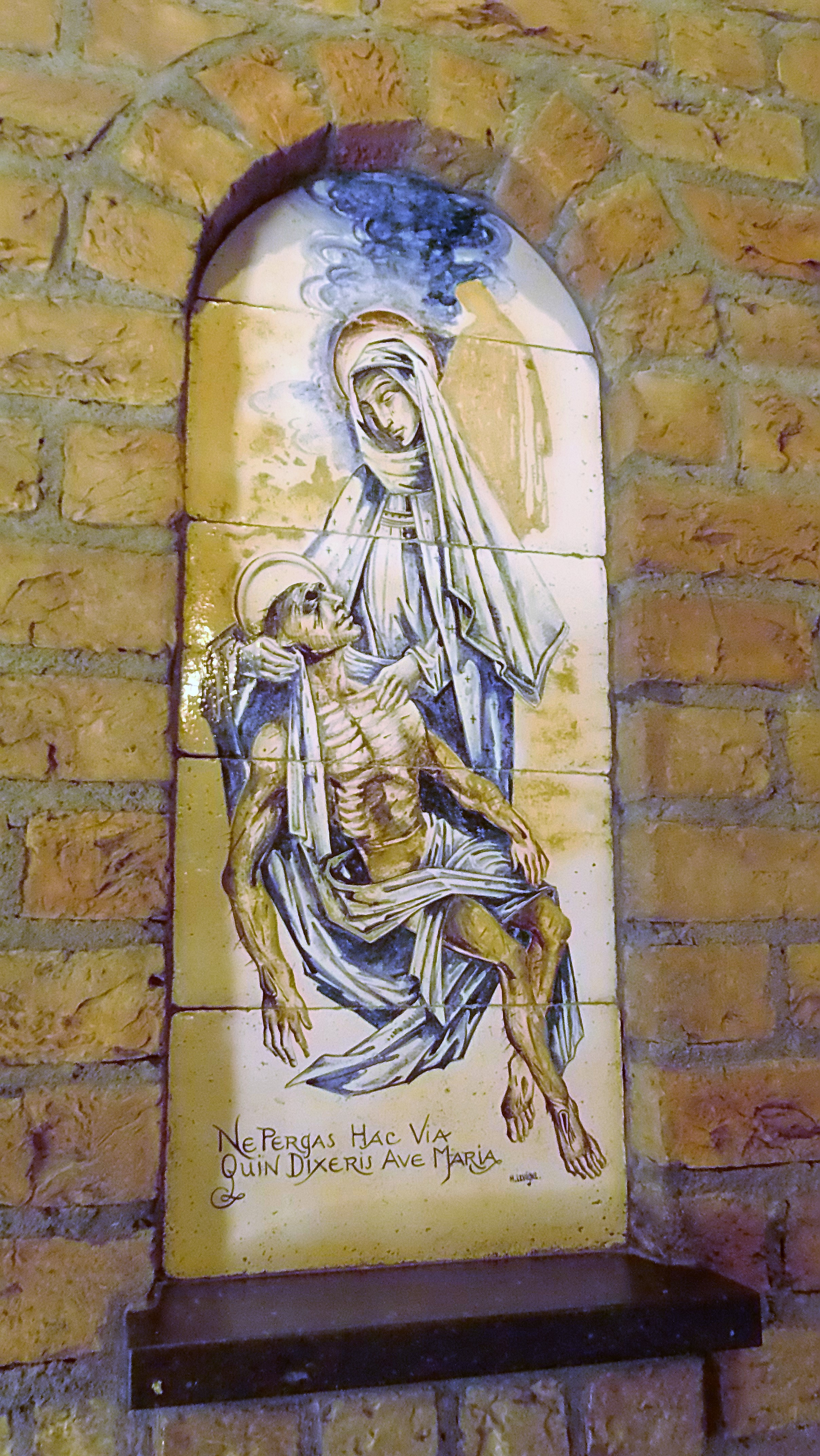
Tile tableaux in Klooster Dolphia, Glanerbrug

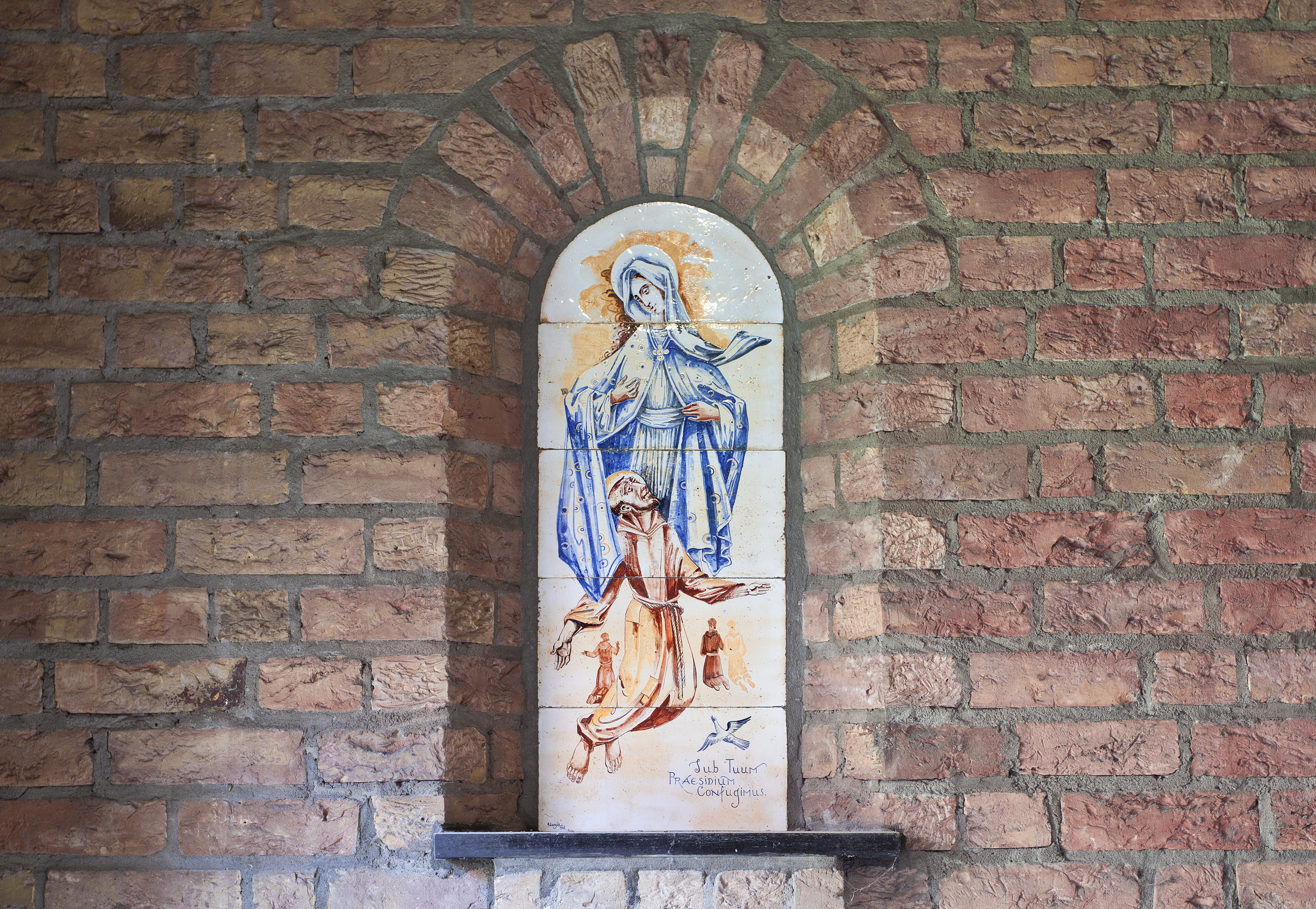
Tile panel above monastery chapel in Klooster Dolphia, Glanerbrug

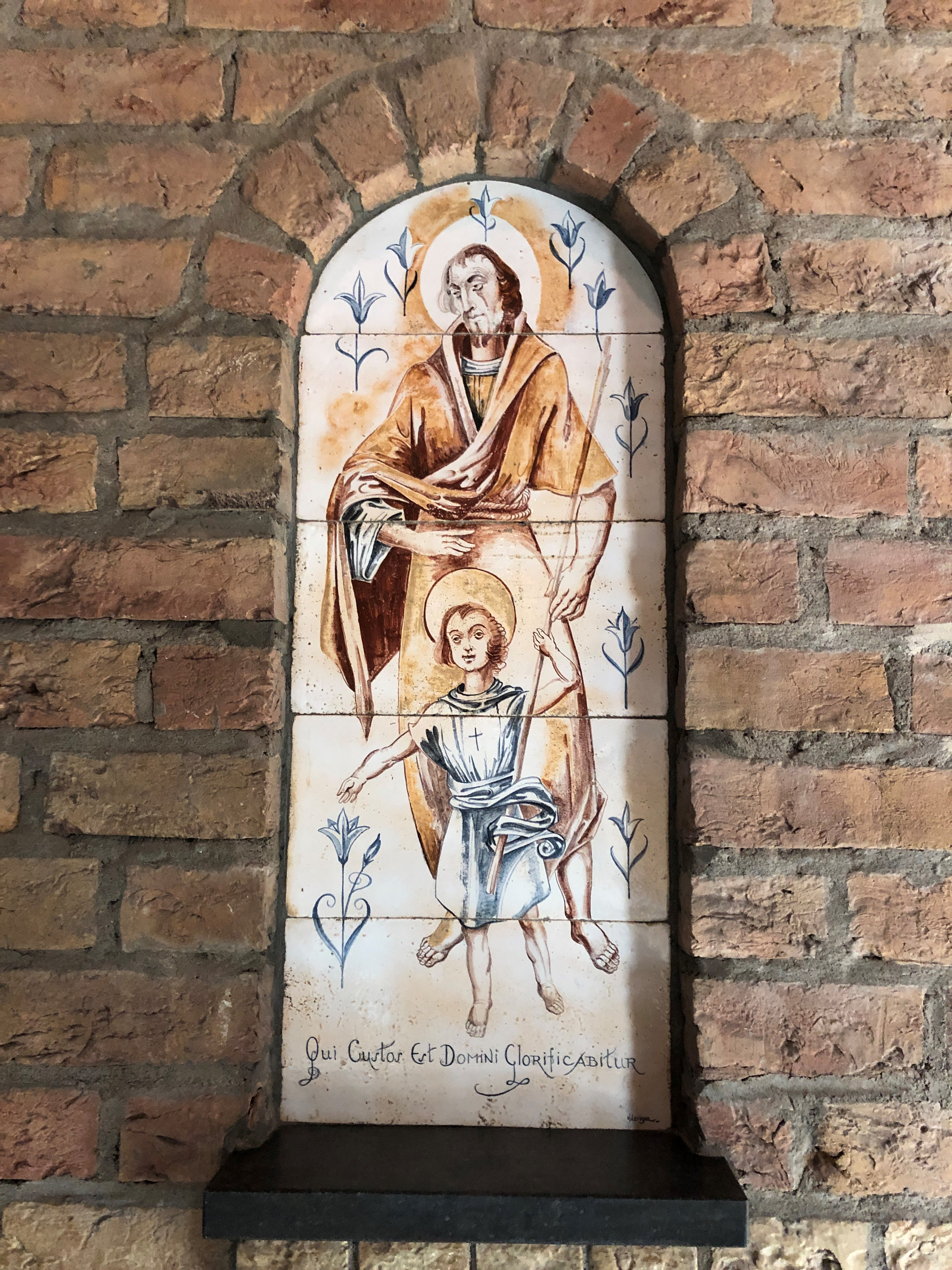
Tile panel in Klooster Dolphia, Glanerbrug, "In honor of the guardian of the steps"
