= Nederlandsche Vereeniging voor Ambachts- en Nijverheidskunst =

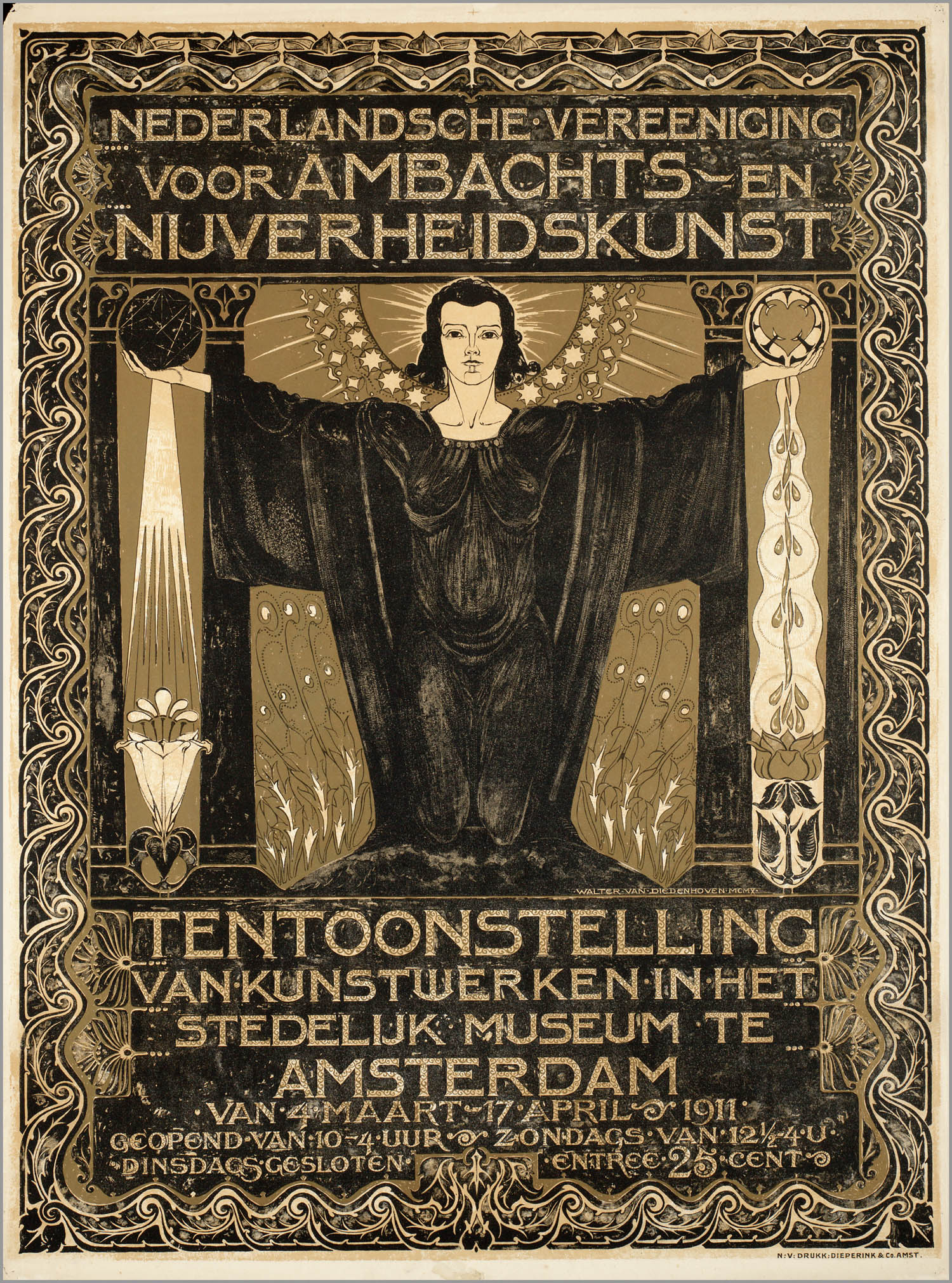
- Poster for exhibition in the Stedelijk Museum
- Formation: 1904
- Dissolved: 1941
- Purpose: promote crafts and industrial design
- Headquarters: Amsterdam, the Netherlands

The Nederlandsche Vereeniging voor Ambachts- en Nijverheidskunst (V.A.N.K.) (Dutch Association for Craft and Industrial Art) was founded in 1904. It was founded by Jacob Pieter van den Bosch, Herman Hana, Klaas van Leeuwen, Theo Molkenboer, and Willem Penaat. At the turn of the century the idea of artist-craftsmen was emerging. The existing Dutch societies and clubs for painters and architects did not adequately represent these artisans and they formed V.A.N.K., the first society for designers in the Netherlands.

V.A.N.K. aimed to elevate crafts and industrial design. Many founders were also interested in the changing focus of design to a new age of "truth, honesty, and realism" in the new century. Founder Willem Penaat focused on artistic ownership and copyright. Membership included artists interested in the socialist democratic movement, as well as artists who were mainly concerned with promoting their work though a trade union. V.A.N.K. organized exhibitions, published yearbooks and a trade journal. Their first exhibition was in 1911 at the Stedelijk Museum. The group went on to organize two shows at the Stedelijk Museum specifically on advertising art, the first in 1917 and again in 1935.

The V.A.N.K. disbanded in 1941 to avoid the compulsory membership of the Nederlandsche Kultuurkamer, the institute created by the German occupying forces during World War II.

== Members ==
Artists who were members of V.A.N.K. as listed in ARTindex Lexicon Online, unless otherwise noted.

- F. van Aanrooy de l'Espinasse
- Annie Abresch
- Ragnhild d' Ailly
- Peter Alma
- Emmy Andriesse
- A. M. Baanders - Fockema
- Bertha Bake
- Karel de Bazel
- Toon Berg
- Eva Besnyö
- Piet Black
- Carel Blazer
- Meijer Bleekrode
- Betty Boet
- Willem Bogtman
- Jacob van den Bosch
- Charles Breijer
- Jan Eloy Brom
- Joanna Brom
- Paul Bromberg
- Wim Brusse
- Fré Cohen
- Andries Dirk Copier
- Walter van Diedenhoven
- Aart van Dobbenburgh
- Sophie van der Does de Willebois
- Wilhelmina Drupsteen
- Christine Duijs
- Jan Eisenloeffel
- Harm Ellens
- Johanna van Eybergen
- Charles Eyck
- M A Faddegon
- Emile Feet
- Hildegard Brom-Fischer
- Chris van Geel
- Roelof Gerbrands
- Jaap Gidding
- Geertruid de Graaff
- A.A.M. Grimmon
- Jan van Ham
- Jan Bertus Heukelom
- Chris van der Hoef
- Pieter A.H. Hofman
- Siem van den Hoonaard
- H E Jansen
- J. de Jong
- Jan Eduard Kann
- Betsy Kerlen
- Gerard Kiljan
- Chris Lanooy
- Chris Lebeau
- Klaas van Leeuwen
- Hubert Levigne
- WJ van der Maarel
- Liesbeth Menalda
- Lex Metz
- Berhardina Midderigh-Bokhorst
- Antoon Molkenboer
- Theo Molkenboer
- Chris de Moor
- Leen Muller
- Cor Mus Hzn
- Cato Neeb
- Willem Hendrik van Norden
- Cas Oorthuys
- Jeanne Bieruma Oosting
- Hendrik Paulides
- Bas Van Pelt
- Willem Penaat
- Bernard Planjer
- Thom Posthuma
- Philip van Praag sr.
- Claar Pronk
- Elizabeth Siewertsz van Reesema
- Jean François van Royen
- Willem Sandberg
- Paul Schuitema
- Anna Sipkema
- Marie Slager
- Cornelis van der Sluys
- Ilse Stemmann
- Bas van der Veer
- Arie Verbeek
- Sophie Verrijn Stuart
- Emile Voeten
- Eugenie Carolina van Vooren
- Leentje de Vries - Hamburger
- G.C. van Wermeskerken
- Ruscha Wijdeveld
- Chris van Yellow
- Meindert Zaalberg
- Christine van Zeegen
- Piet Zwart
- Frans Zwollo sr

== Gallery ==
Selected work by members of VANK

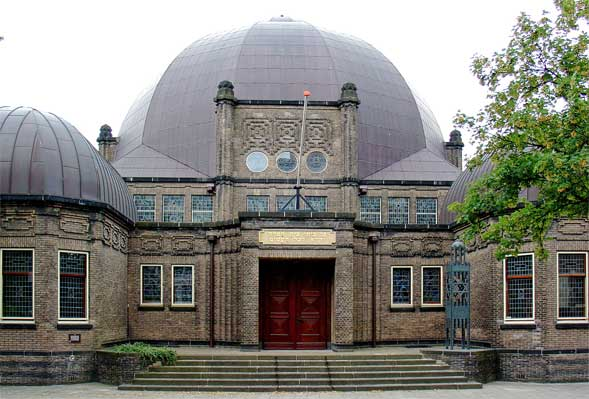
Synagogue Enschede by Karel de Bazel

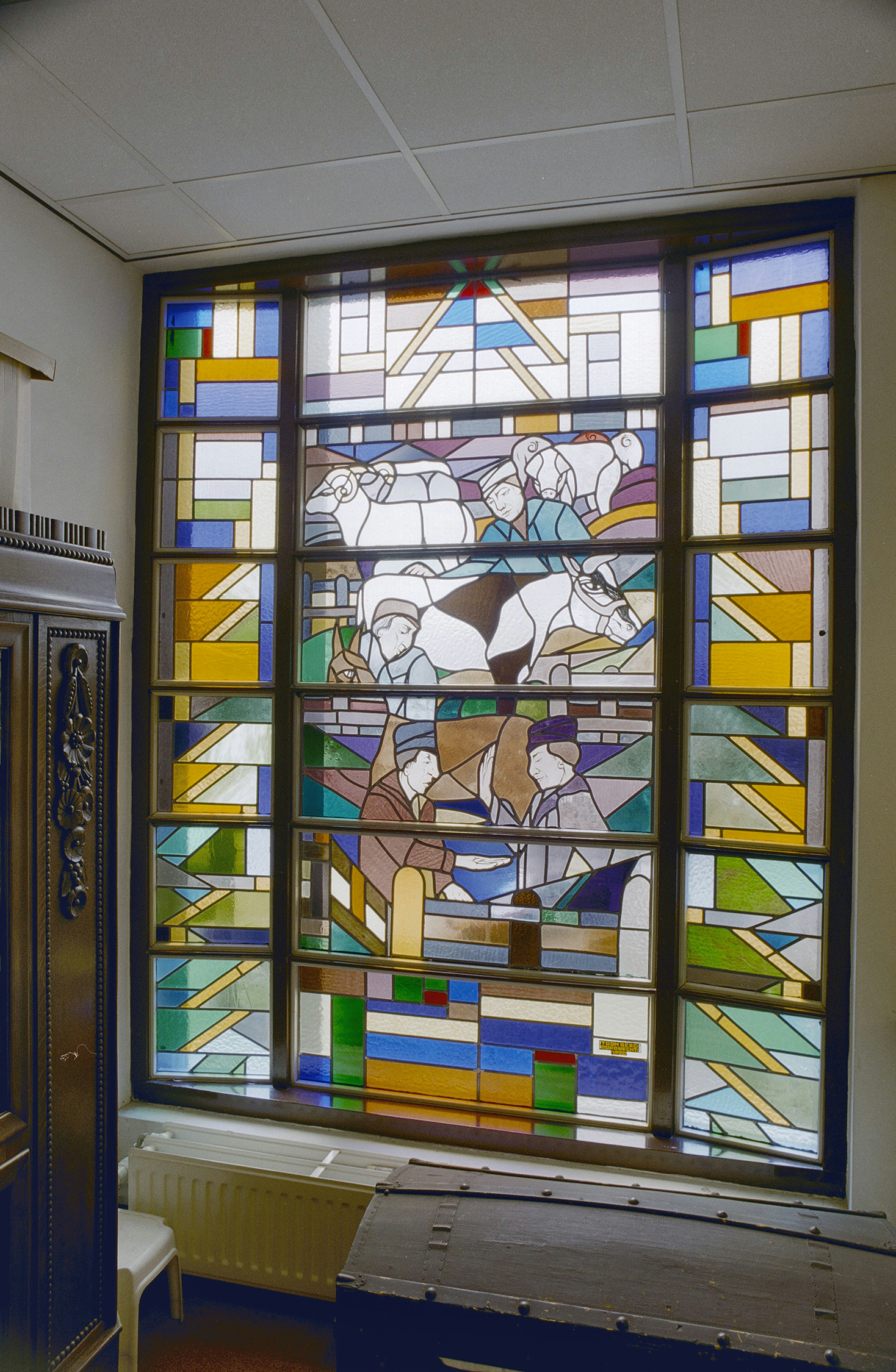
Stained glass window by Toon Berg, 1926

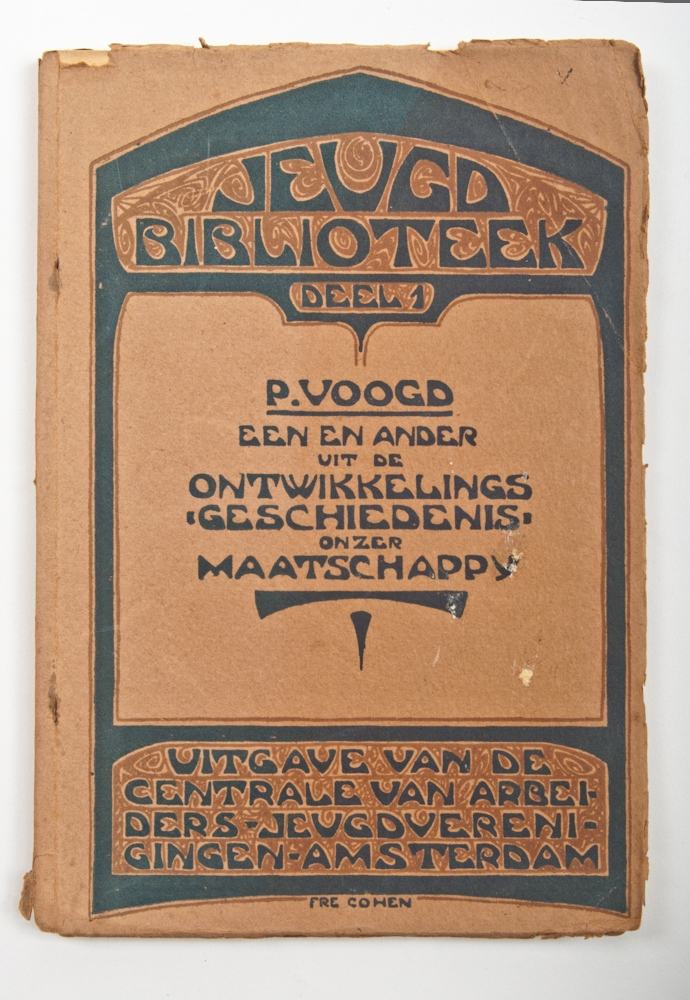
Youth library AJC 01 (cover) by Fré Cohen

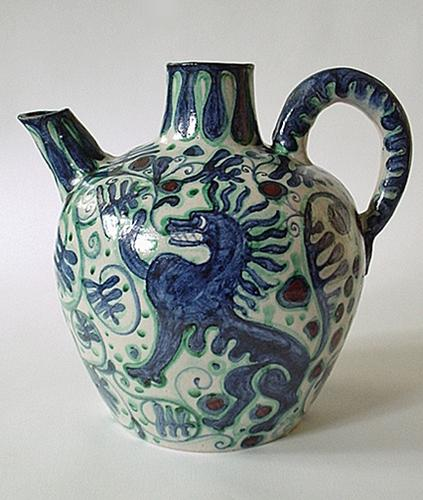
Jug with decoration of two dragons by Sophie van der Does de Willebois, 1928

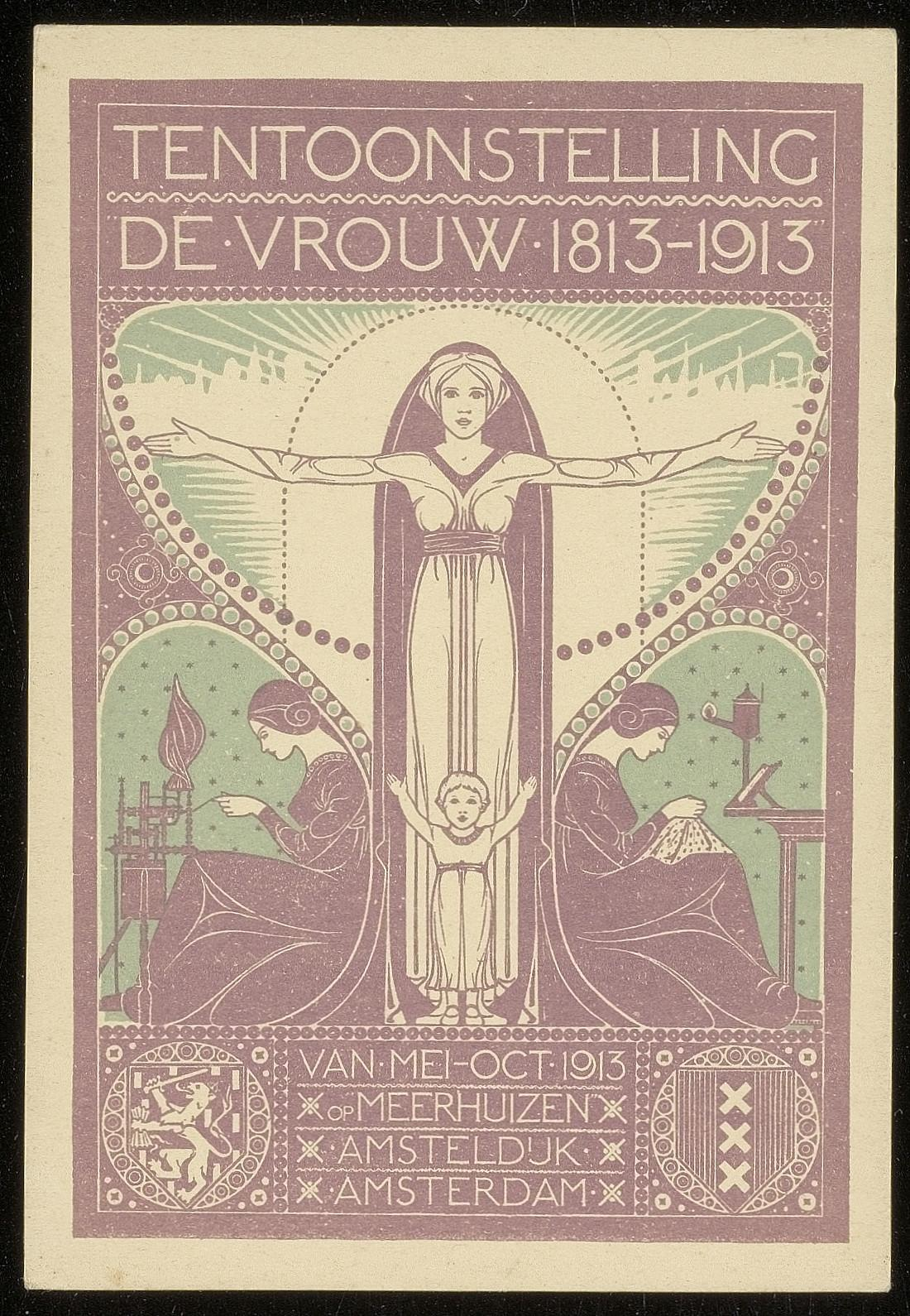
poster of the exhibition De Vrouw 1813-1913 by Wilhelmina Drupsteen

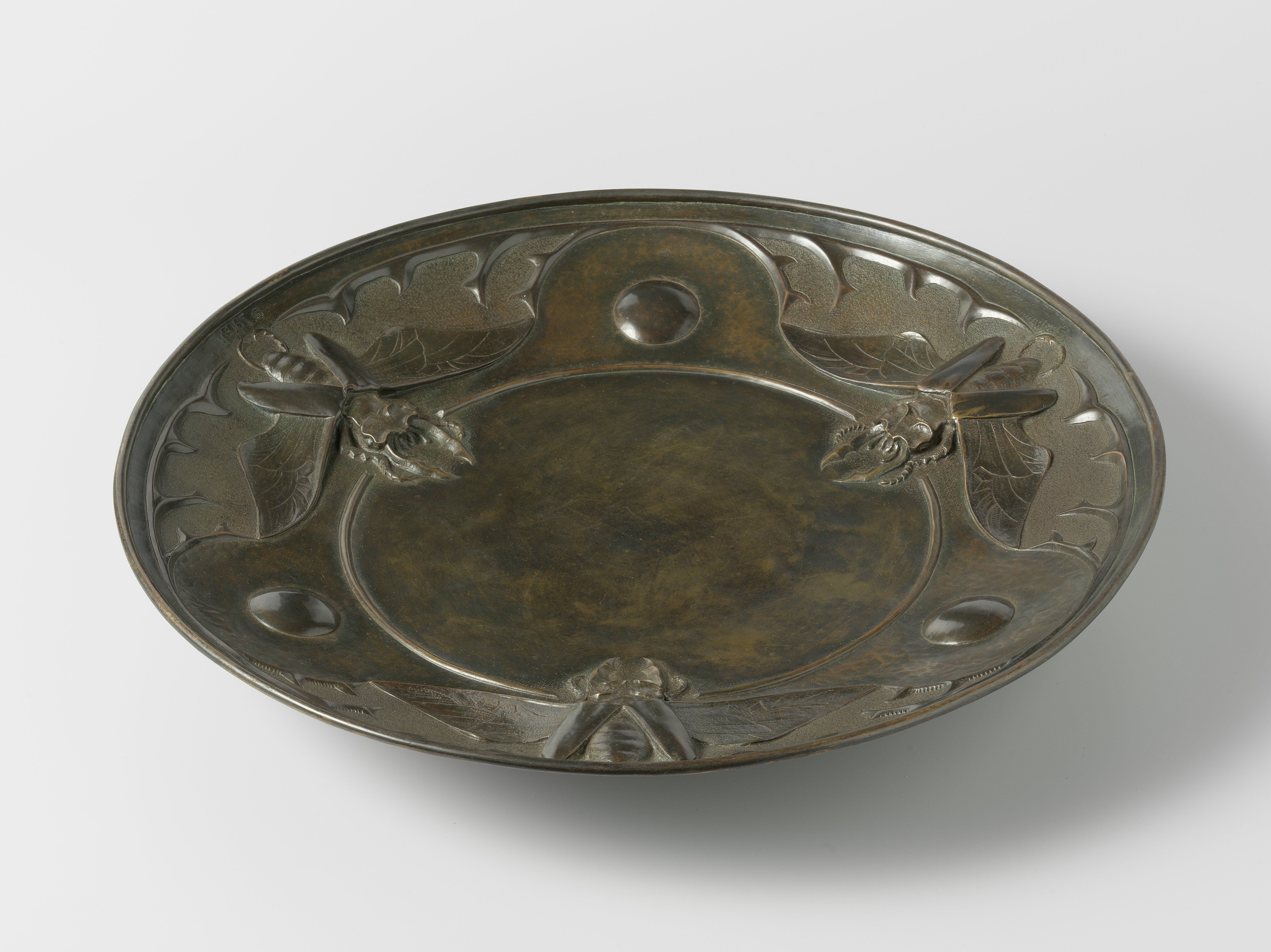
Bowl with dragonflies in relief by Johanna van Eybergen

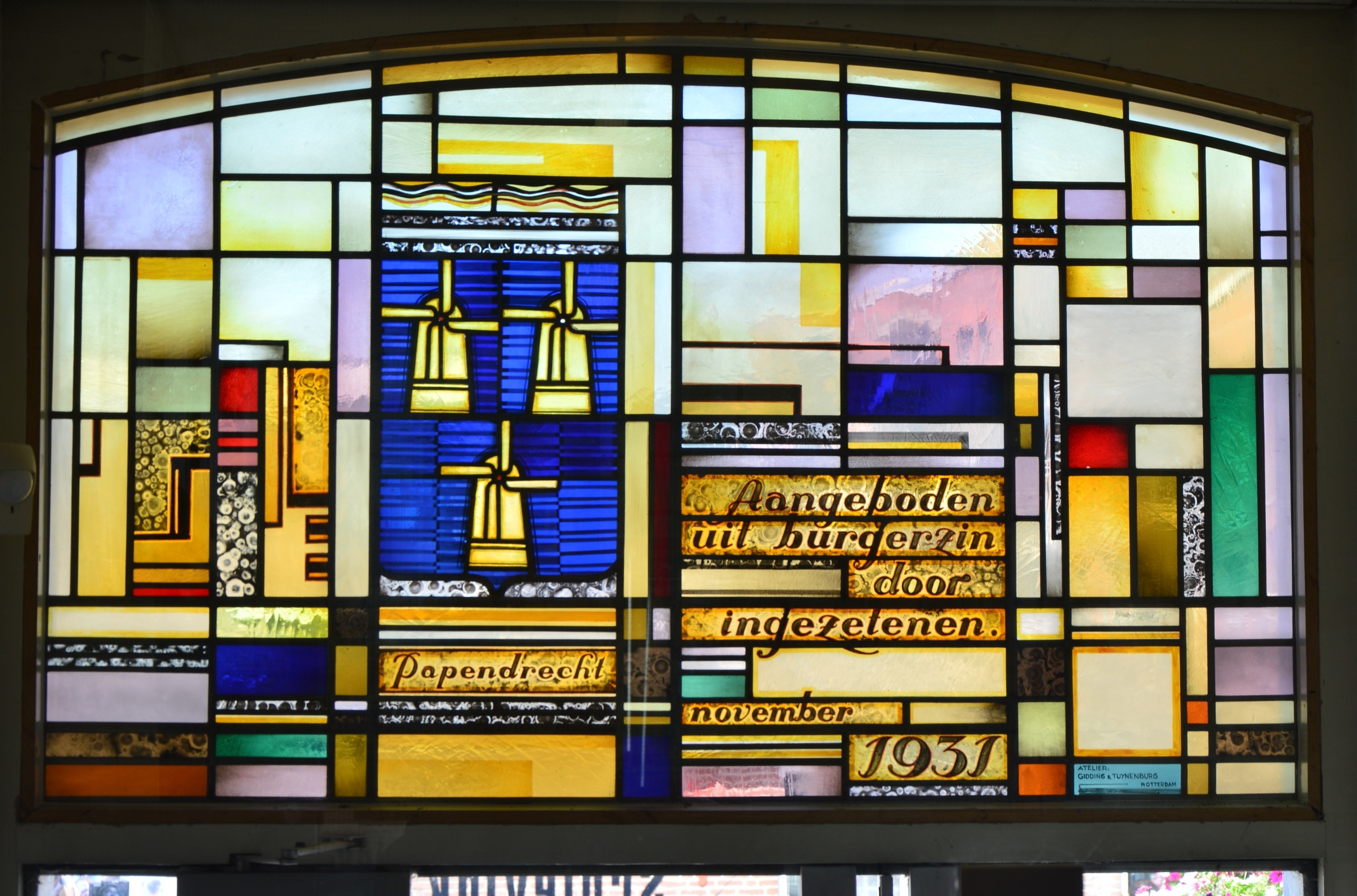
Stained-glass window by Jaap Gidding

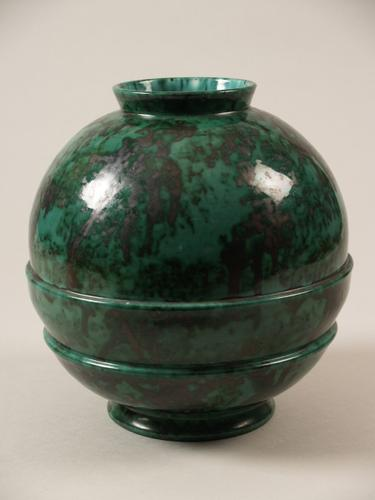
Vase, model 334, with green-black spotted decoration, 1927 - 1934 by Cornelis van der Sluys

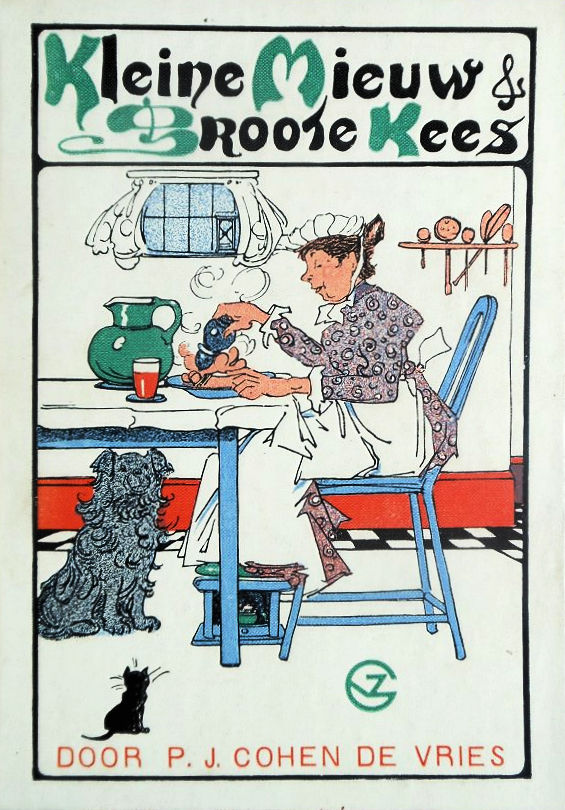
"Kleine Mieuw en Groote Kees" (1923) by P.J. Cohen de Vries. Book binding drawn by Bas van der Veer.

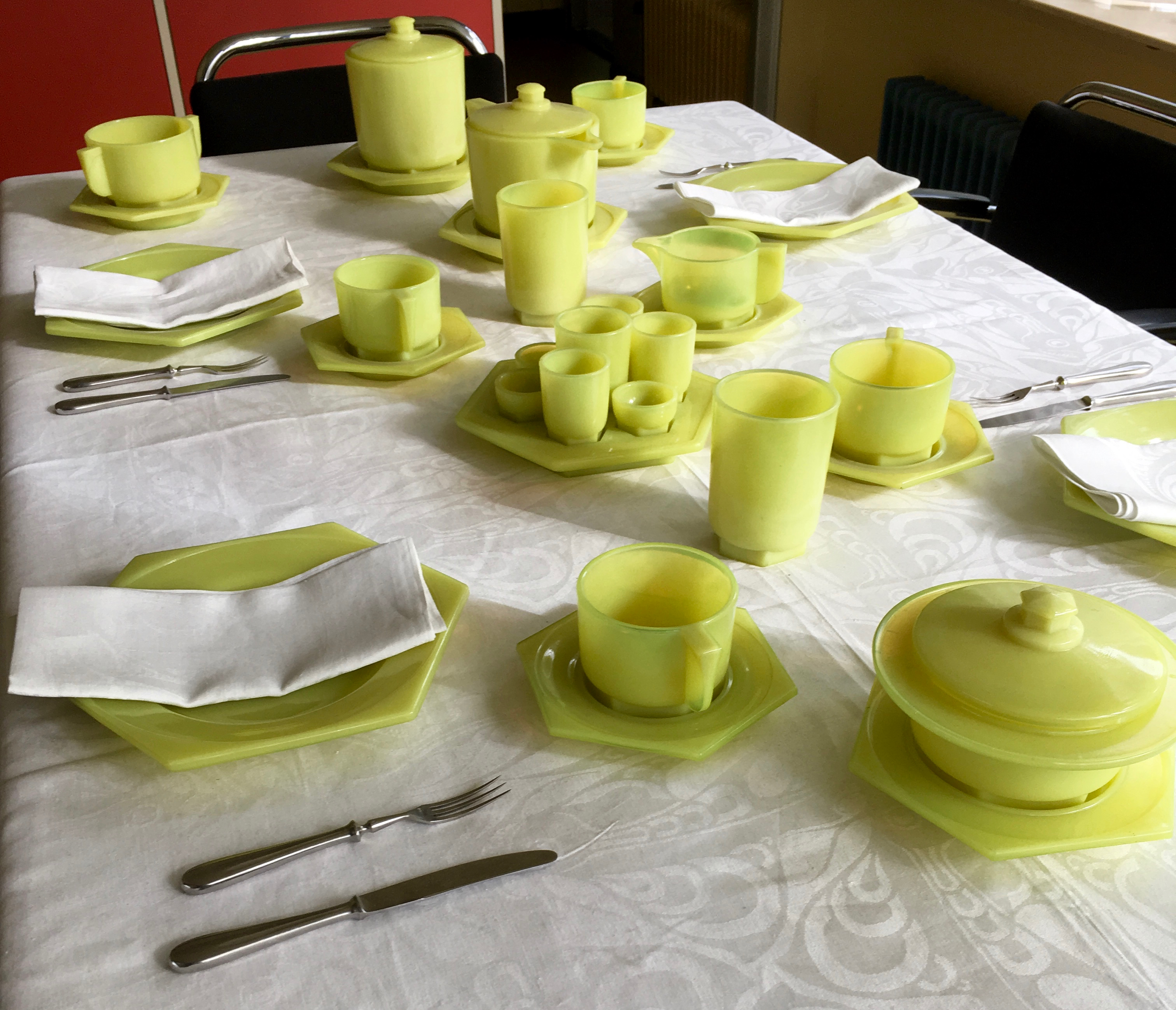
Pressed glass breakfast set, H.P. Berlage and Piet Zwart
