= Aart van Dobbenburgh =

Dutch artist (1899–1988)

Aart van Dobbenburgh (Amsterdam, 30 September 1899 – Haarlem, 3 July 1988) was a Dutch graphic artist known for his fine lithographs. Popular themes in his work included flowers, portraits, and landscapes, but human hands were his favorite. Dobbenburgh illustrated among others the books of the Russian writers Leo Tolstoy and Fyodor Dostoyevsky.

Dobbenburgh was a member of Nederlandsche Vereeniging voor Ambachts- en Nijverheidskunst (V.A.N.K.) the Dutch Association for Craft and Craft Art.

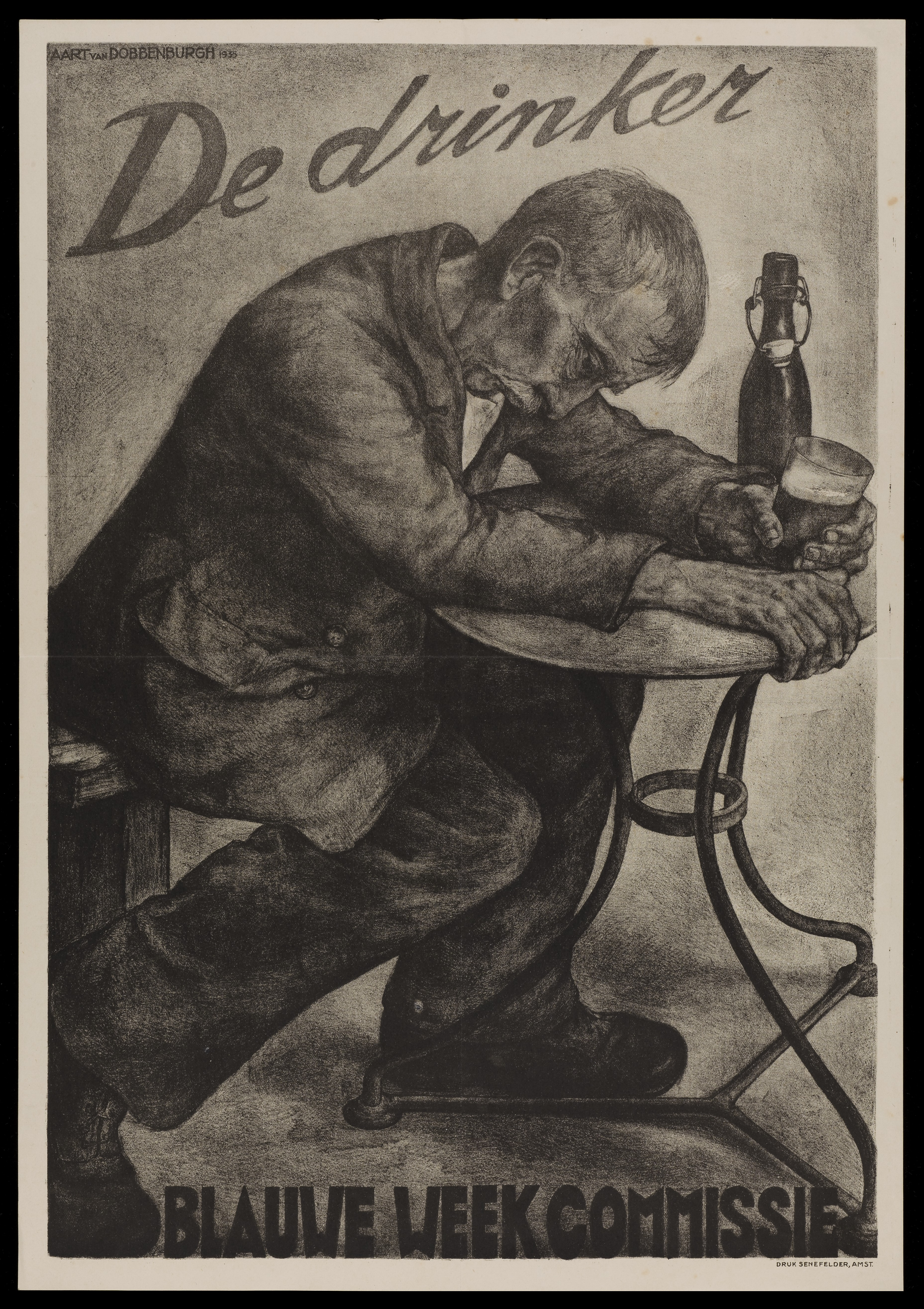
Warning against alcohol

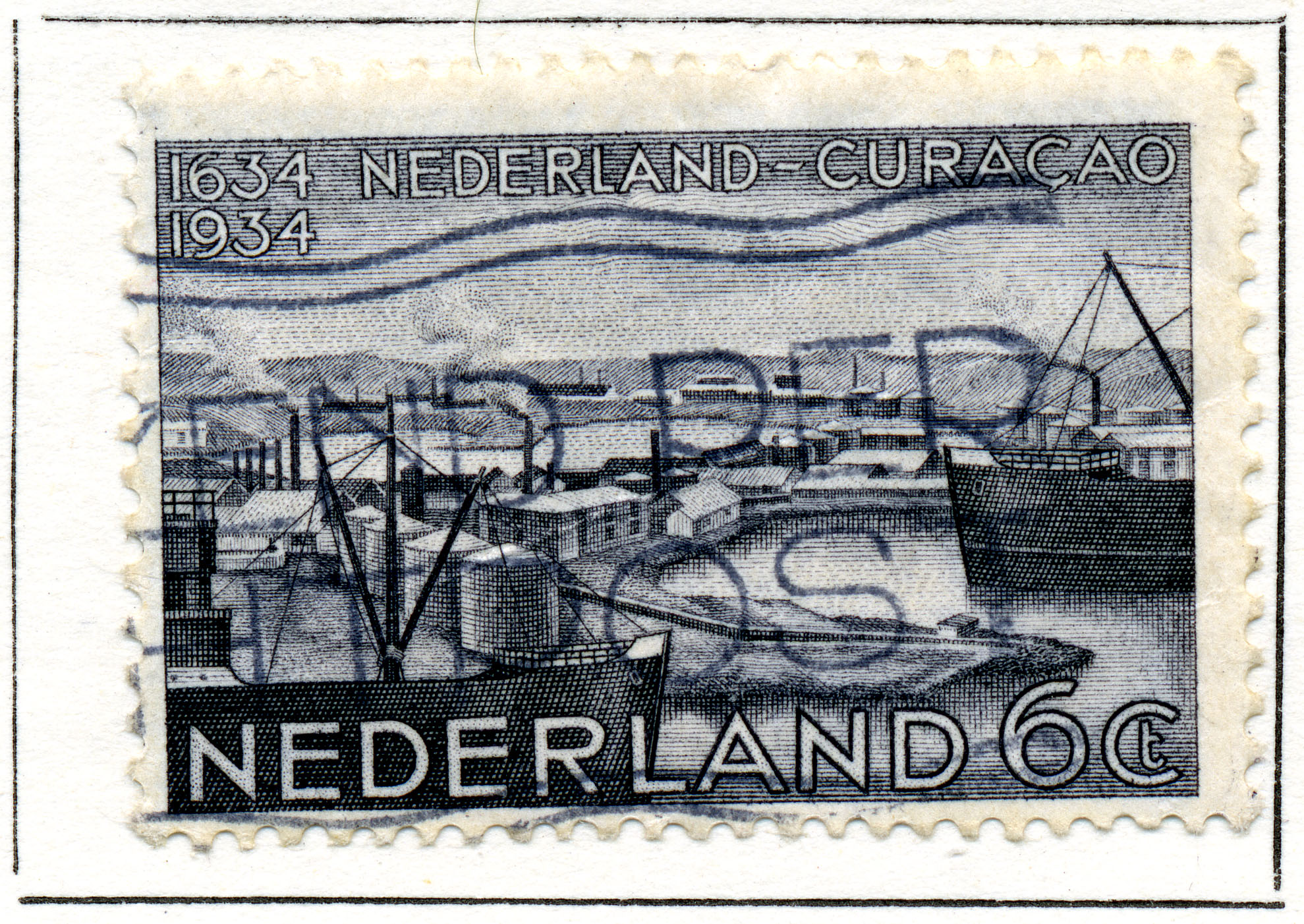
Stamp 1934

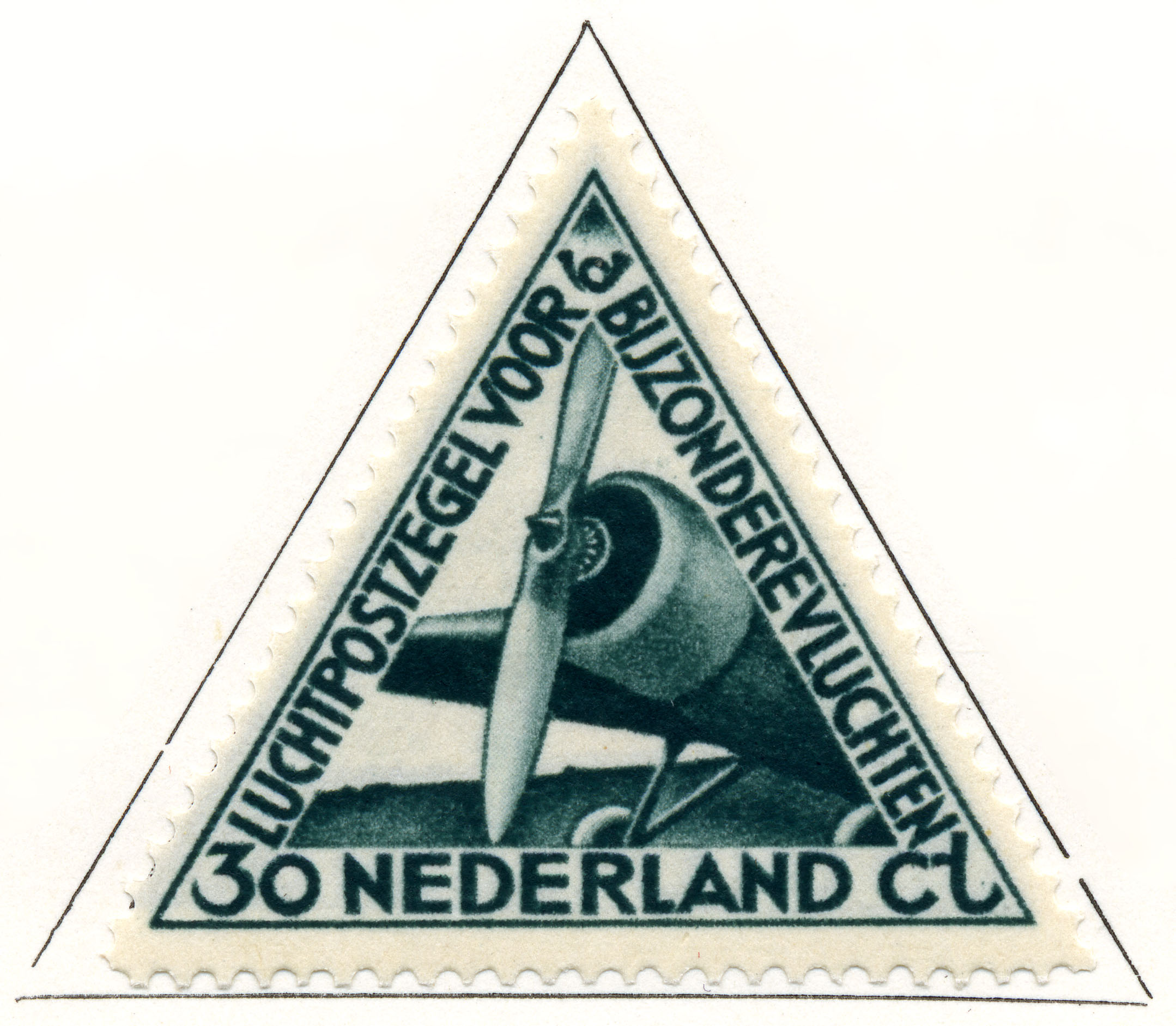
Stamp 1933

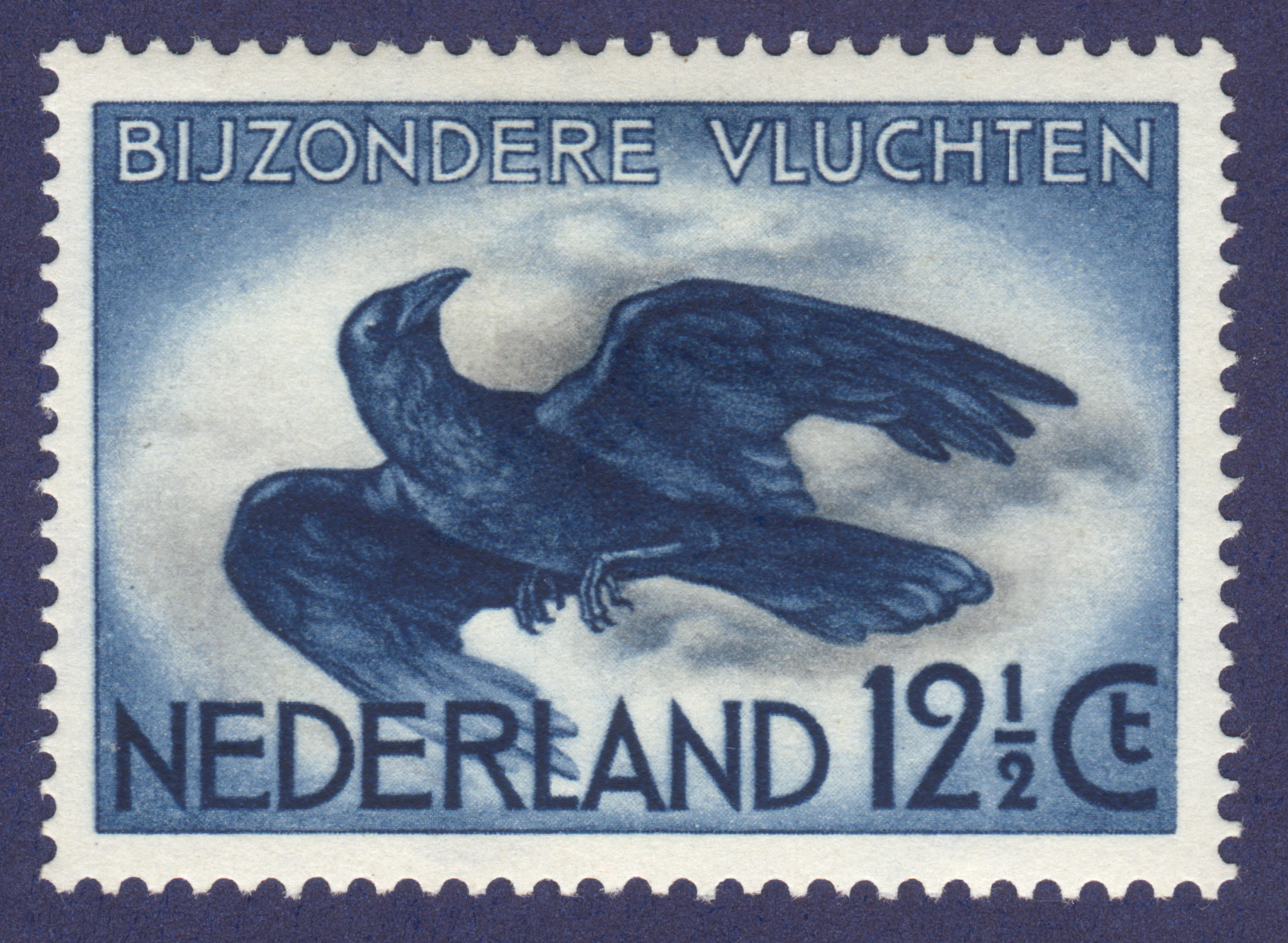
Stamp 1933
