= Hildegard Brom-Fischer =

Dutch textile artist

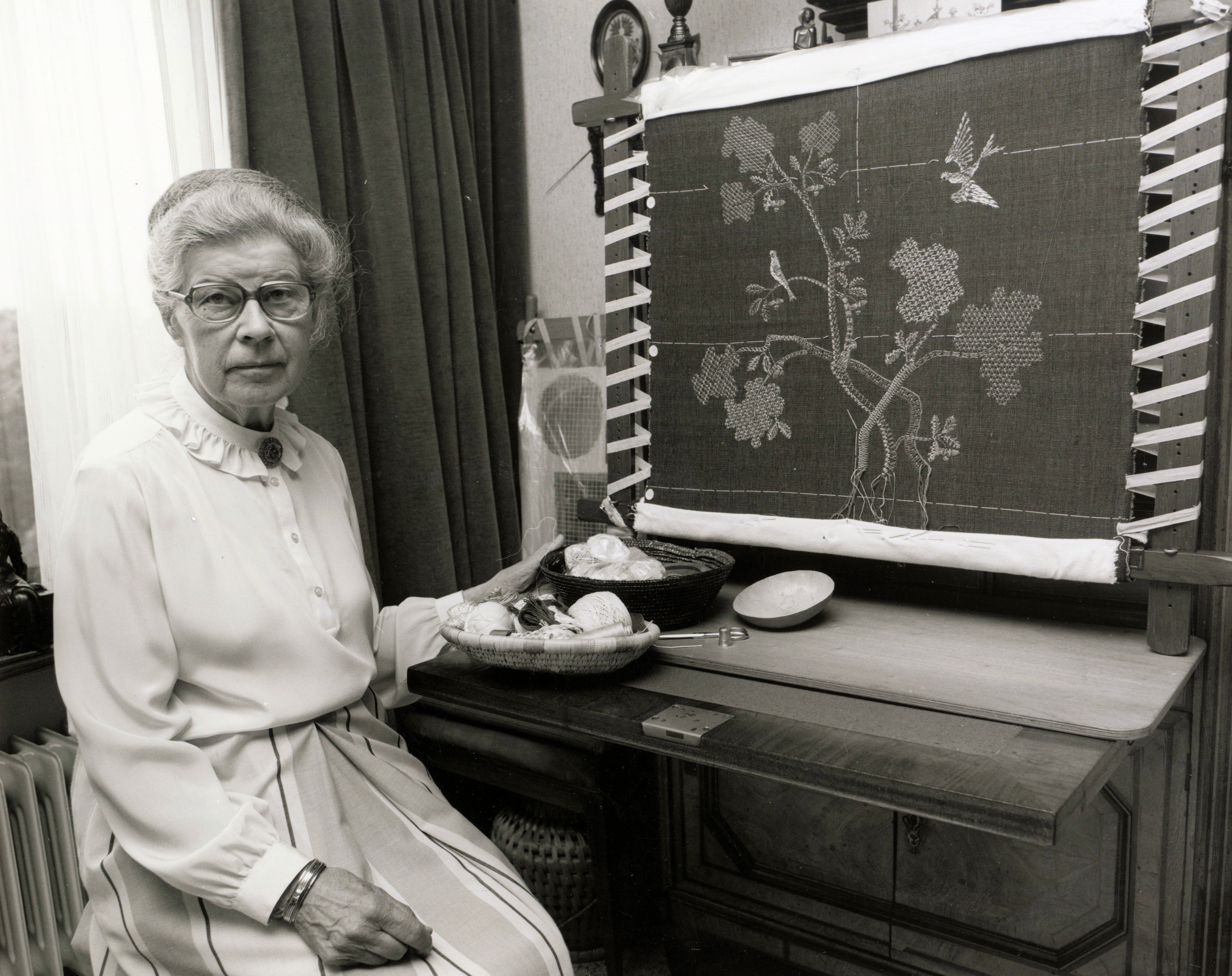
- Born: Hildegard Maria Margarete Fischer; 16 July 1908; Coesfeld, Germany
- Died: 22 April 2001 (aged 92); Utrecht, Netherlands
- Known for: Textile Arts
- Spouse: Jan Eloy Brom

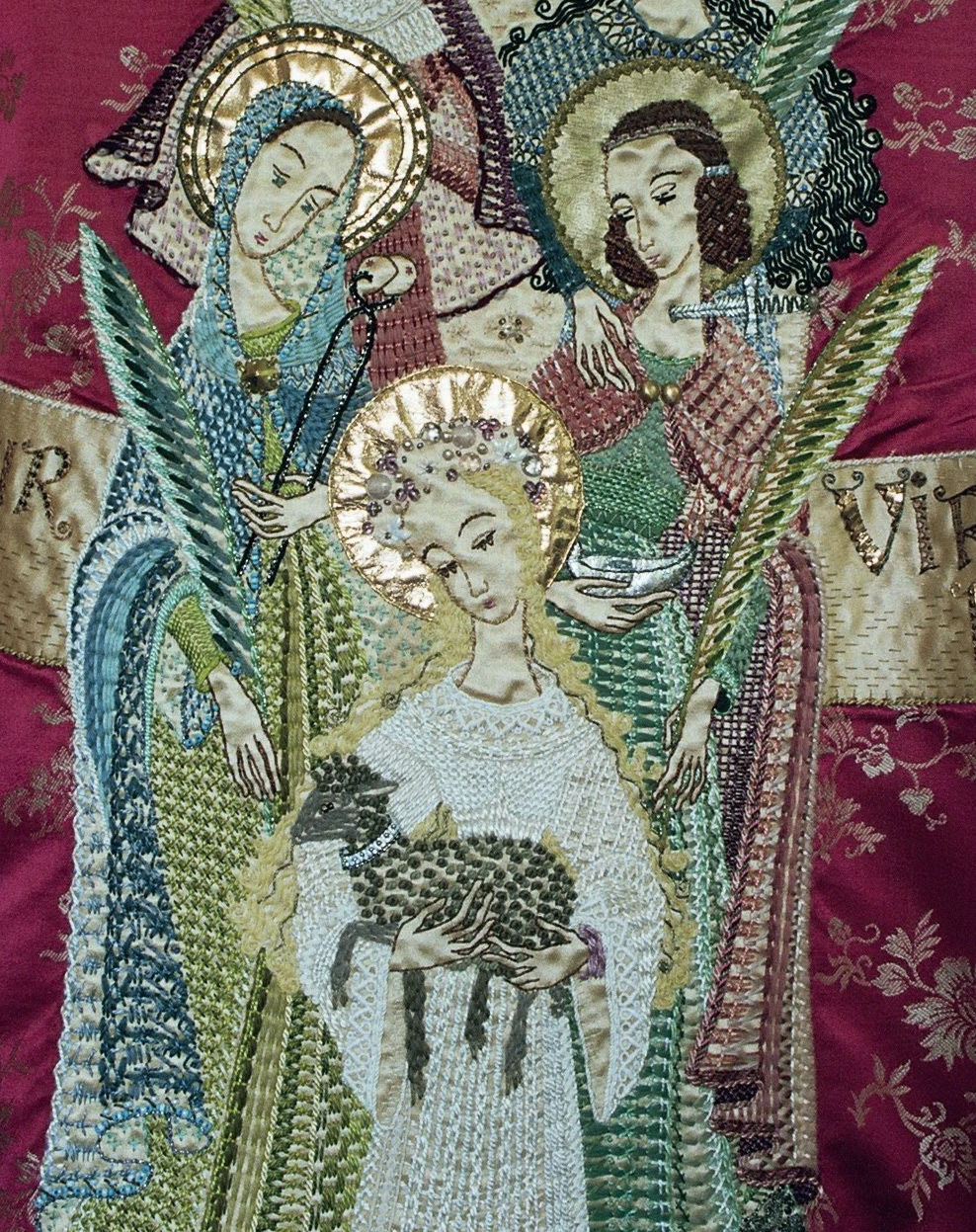
Embroidery by Hildegard Brom-Fischer

Hildegard Brom-Fischer (1908-2001) was a Dutch textile artist, specializing in ecclesiastical embroidery.

== Biography ==
Brom-Fischer was born on 16 July 1908 in Coesfeld, Germany. She studied at the training center for applied arts Werkkunstschule in Münster, Germany. She studied with Joos Jaspert. By 1937 she had located to the Netherlands, living in Amsterdam, Oudenrijn, Utrecht, and Bunnik. Brom-Fischer was a member of Nederlandsche Vereeniging voor Ambachts- en Nijverheidskunst (V.A.N.K.) the Dutch Association for Craft and Craft Art. She was married to Jan Eloy Brom. Focusing on Christian themes, she created multiple pieces featuring Saints Cosmas and Damian.

Brom-Fischer exhibited at the 1933 Milan Triennial and the Stedelijk Museum Amsterdam.

Brom-Fischer died on 22 April 2001 in Utrecht. Her work is in the collection of the Museum Catharijneconvent in Utrecht.
