= Cornelis van der Sluys =

Dutch interior designer (1883–1944)

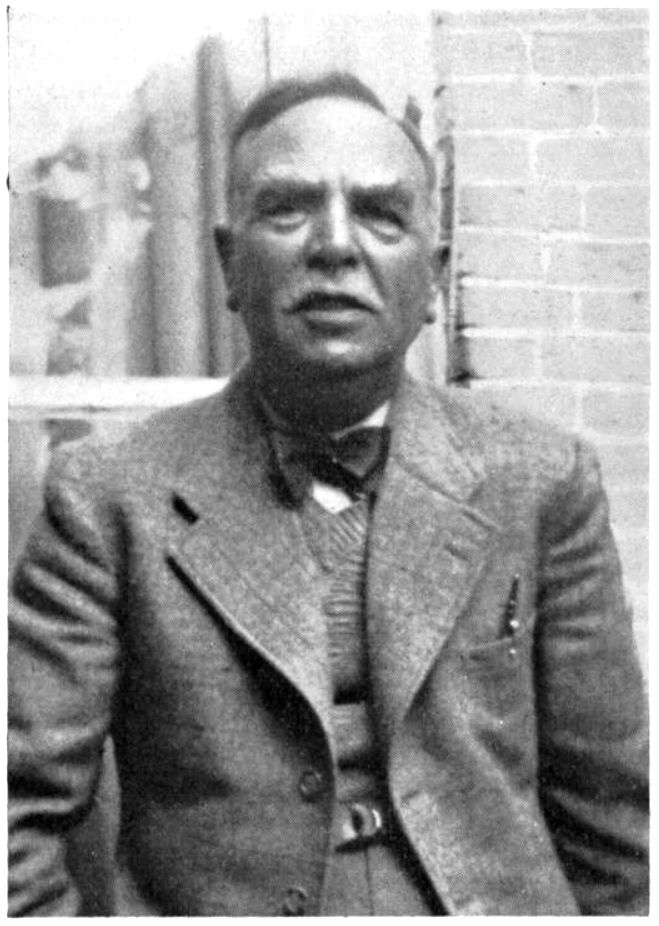
Cornelis van der Sluys, 1938

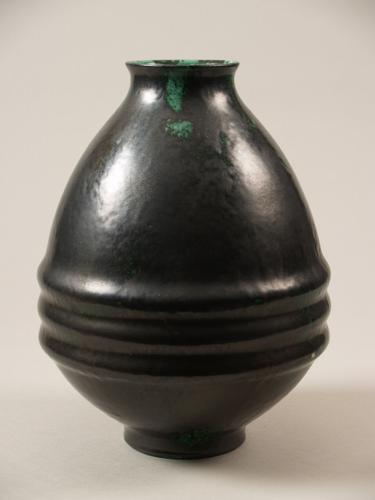
Vase, model 306, with green-black mottled decor, designed by Cornelis van der Sluys for ESKAF, 1927–34.

Cornelis van der Sluys (Brouwershaven, 4 June 1883 – Amsterdam, 4 January 1944) was a Dutch furniture and textile designer, interior designer, decorator, glass painter, sculptor, goldsmith, organizer, and publicist.

Van der Sluys designed textile, made designs for carpets, wallpaper and chairs and ceramic decorations on pottery for the first Steenwijker Art Pottery Factory. From 1901 to 1904 he designed Belgian and French Art Nouveau, Arts & Crafts copper work and designs for batiks for the Hague art dealers.

== Life and work ==
Cornelis van der Sluys was the son of Willem van der Sluys (agent) and Anna Constandse. He married for the first time in 1909 with Hermanna van Maanen and had with her a son Fritz. For the second time he married in 1932 with Victoria Strauss and they had a son, called Rudolf.

After training as a decorative painter, he was educated at the Academy of Visual Arts in The Hague from 1894 to 1899 where he was a pupil of amongst others under Johan Thorn Prikker and Eduard Willem Frederik Kerling.

He worked in The Hague from 1901 to 1904 as chief draftsman at art dealers arts & crafts. In 1905 to 1906 he made a tour of Europe, notably in Belgium and England then returned to The Hague, where he kept worked from 1906 to 1944.

Together with H.T. Coolwijk (business manager) they founded the company "Corn. Van der Sluys," located in a house with several showrooms on the Avenue of New East Indies. Later the firm moved to the Lange Houtstraat. In 1916, the company is dissolved. In 1916–1918 he established the Office of Interior Architecture and Furniture in the Old Molstraat with Van der Sluys as director. From 1918 to 1944 he had his office and house at Noordeinde 162 in The Hague.

Van der Sluys was a member of the Association for Craft and Art Industry (VANK) in The Hague in 1908: Commission for Architecture, Applied Arts and Graphical Arts; VANK 1913 – 1923 secretary applied arts and design, terminates membership in 1925; co-founder (1926) and Chairman (1929–1935) of the Society for Cultural Cooperation.

== See also ==
- List of Dutch ceramists
