= Johanna van Eybergen =

Dutch artist

Johanna Gerarda Theodora van Eybergen (also spelled van Eijbergen, 17 April 1865, Ambon — 13 May 1950, The Hague) was a Dutch artist specializing in applied arts and design, notable for her Art Nouveau work on metal. She was the first and for a long time the only Duch woman artist working on design on metal.

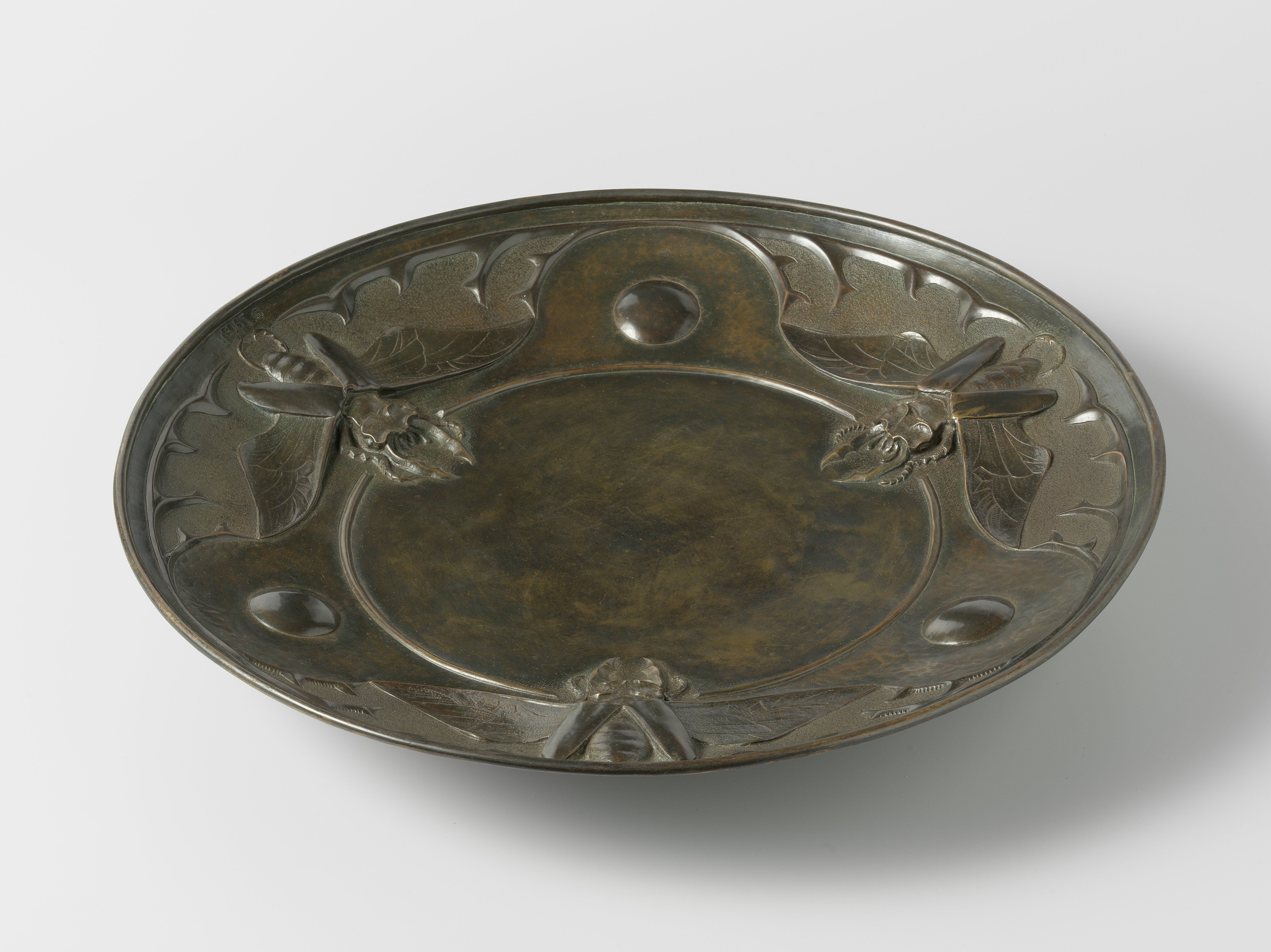
Bowl with dragonflies in relief

Eybergen studied painting and metal design at the Royal Academy of Art between 1887 and 1893. Between 1904 and 1909 she worked at the coppersmith workshop at the G. Dikkers & Co. in Hengelo, creating Art Nouveau design. Her ornaments used mainly natural themes, often insects. After that and until 1930 she worked as a drawing teacher in Alkmaar. Eybergen was a member of Nederlandsche Vereeniging voor Ambachts- en Nijverheidskunst (V.A.N.K.) the Dutch Association for Craft and Craft Art.
