= Charles Breijer =

Dutch photographer

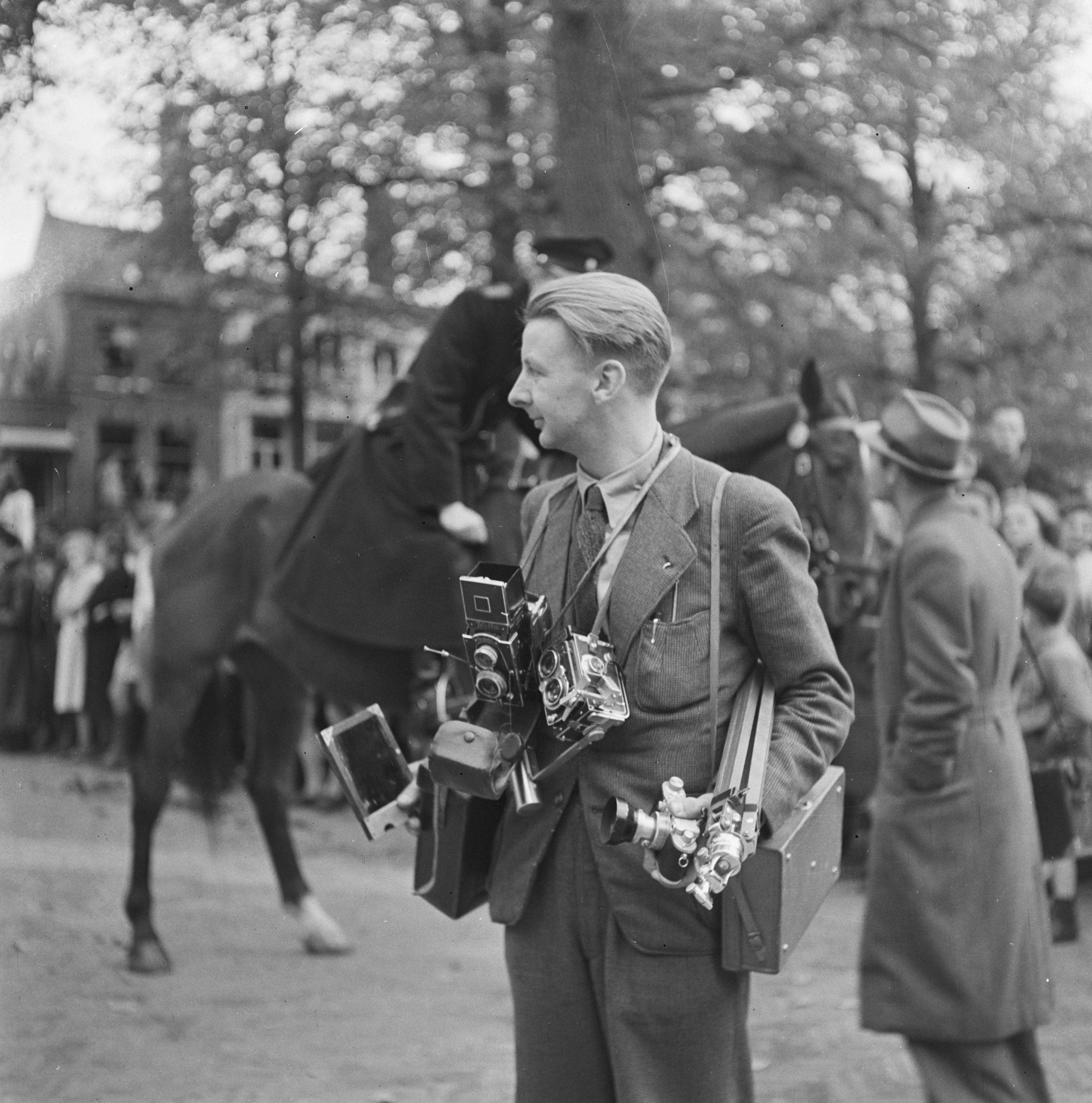
Breijer in October 1945

Charles Breijer (26 November 1914, The Hague – 18 August 2011, Hilversum) was a Dutch photographer, known as a "resistance photographer," notable especially for the photographs he took during the last year of the German occupation of The Netherlands during World War II. Breijer was a member of Nederlandsche Vereeniging voor Ambachts- en Nijverheidskunst (V.A.N.K.) the Dutch Association for Craft and Craft Art.

== Some photographs ==
=== The Netherlands 1945 ===
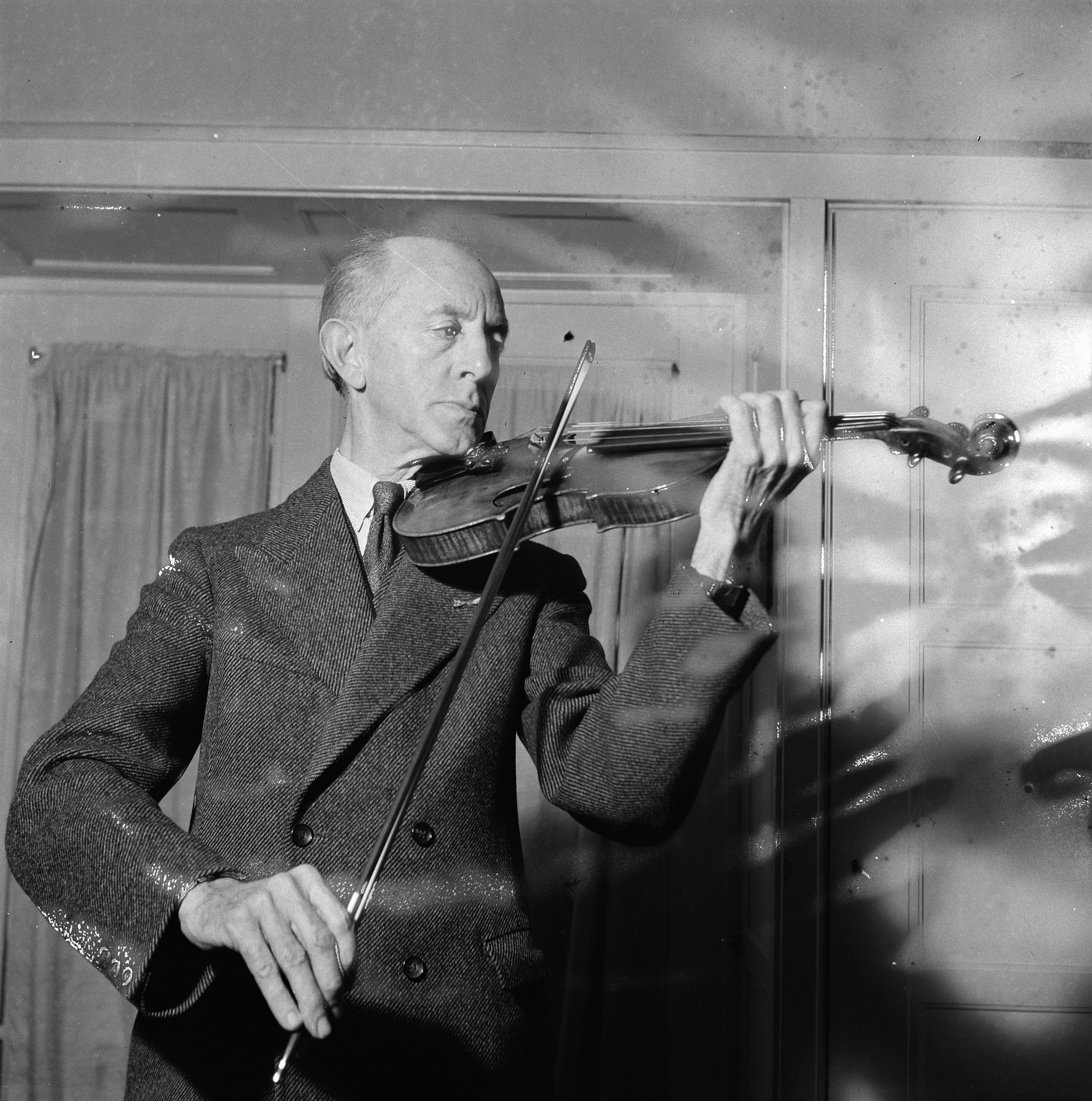
Ferdinand Helmann (1945)

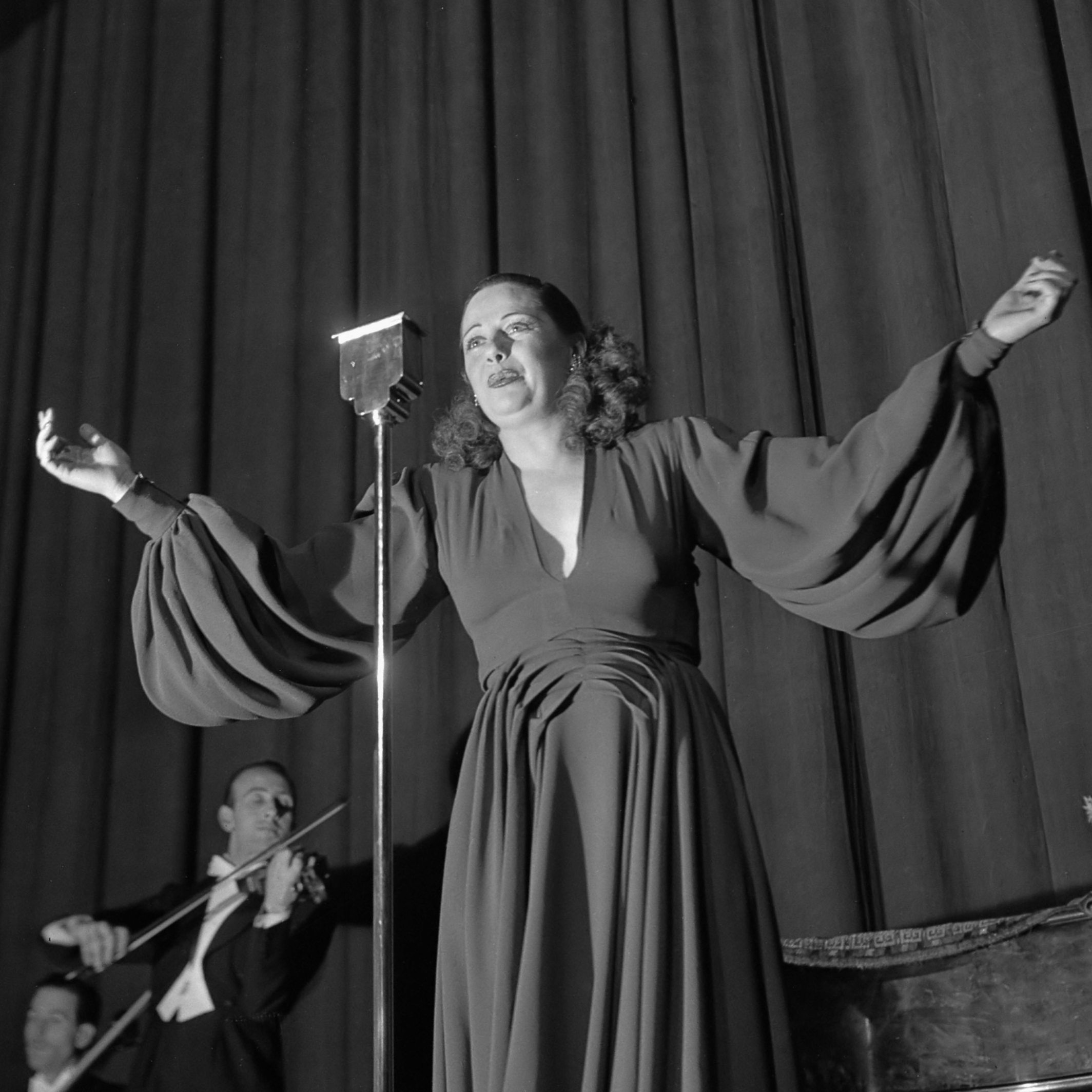
Lucienne Boyer (1945)

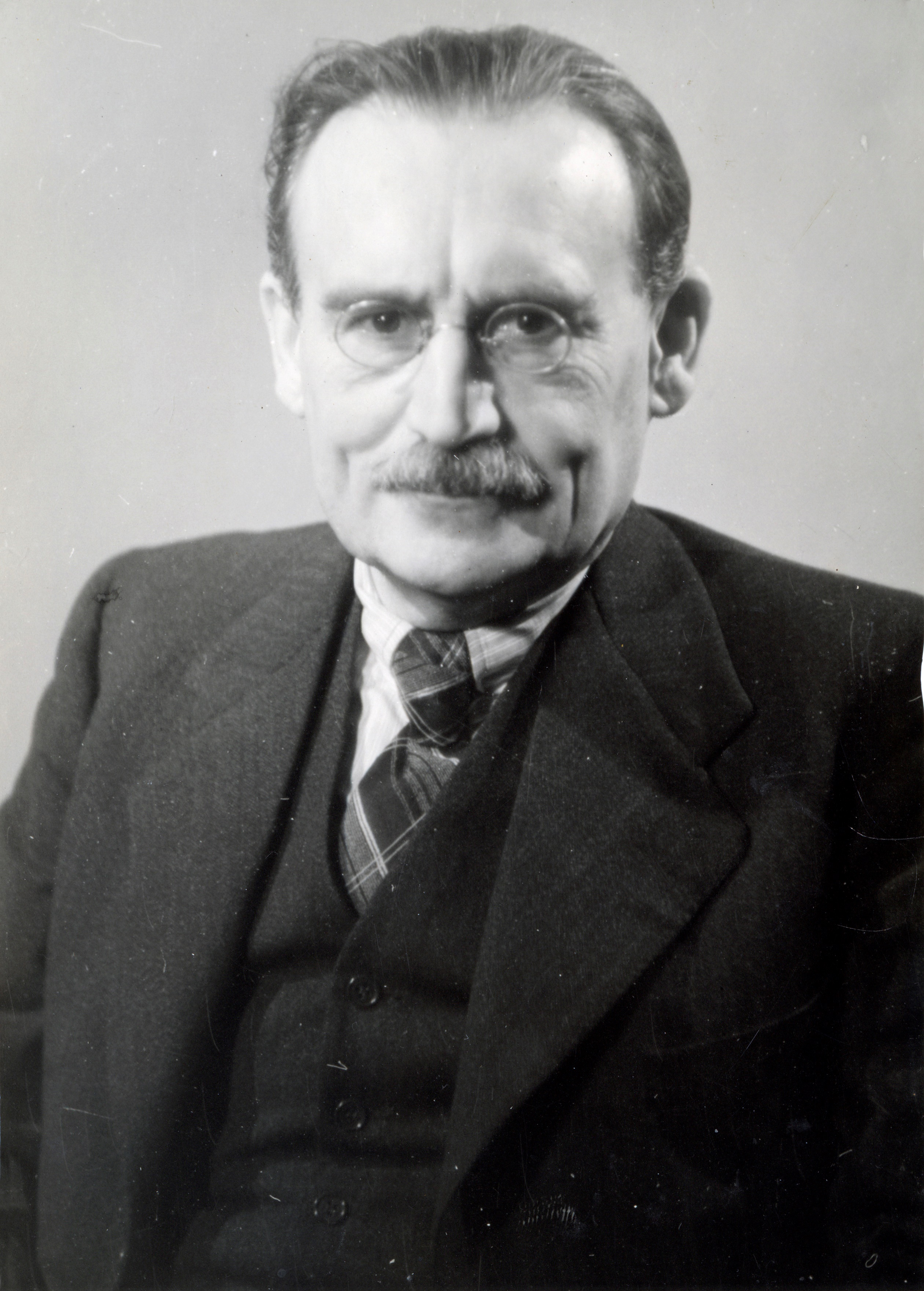
Willem Drees

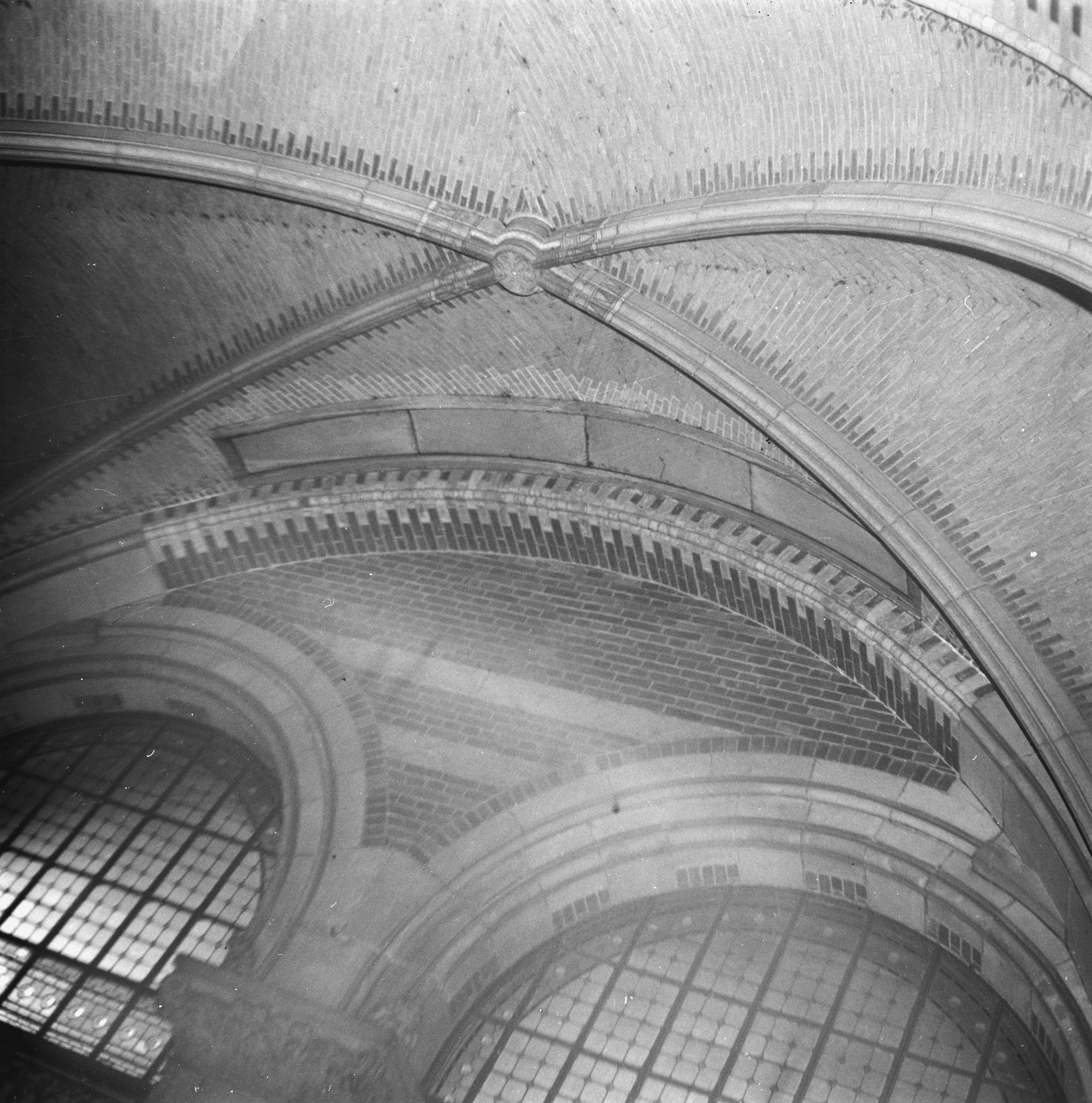
Escape of The Night Watch (1945)

=== Indonesia c. 1950 ===
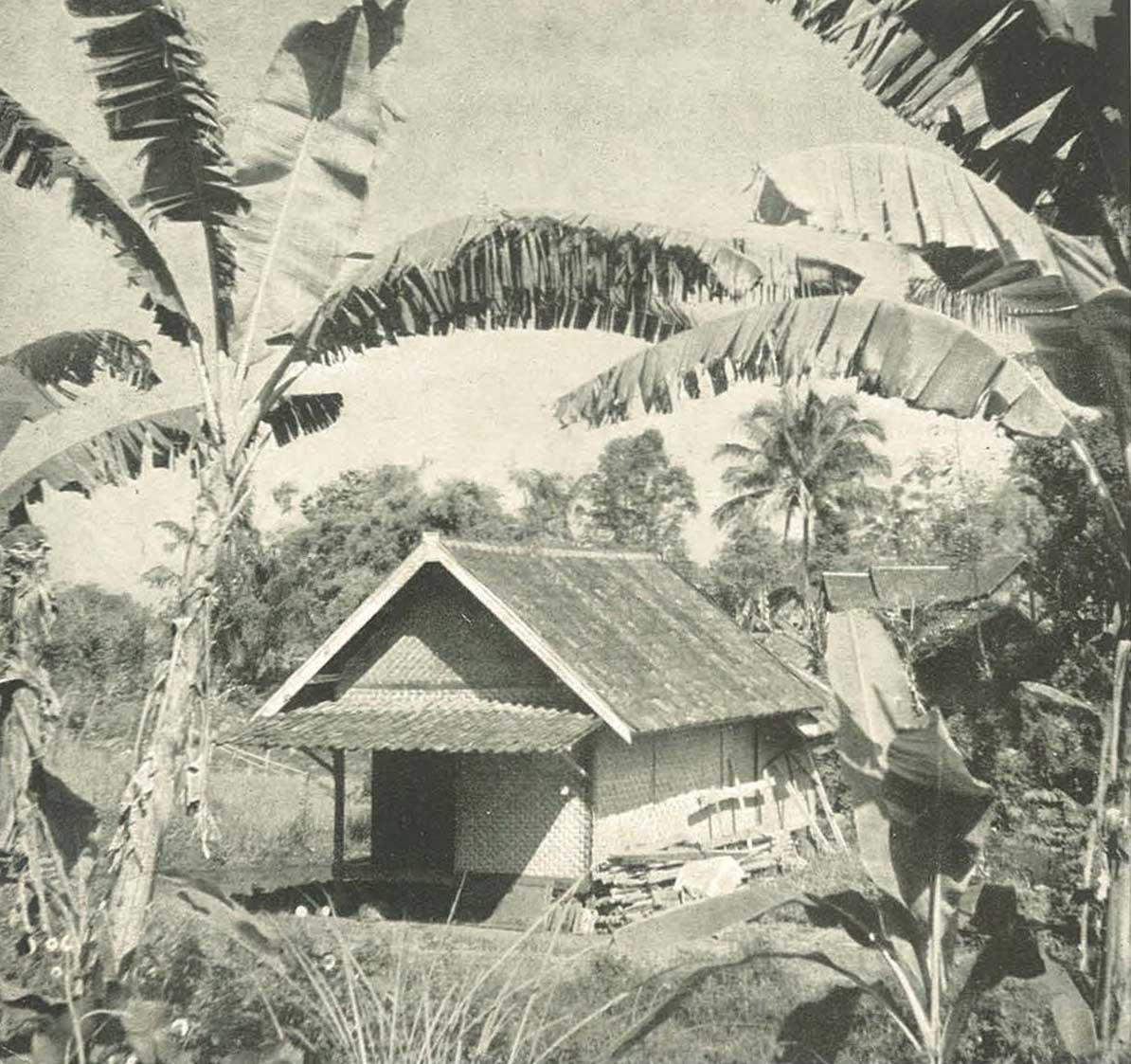
Farmer's house
(West Java)

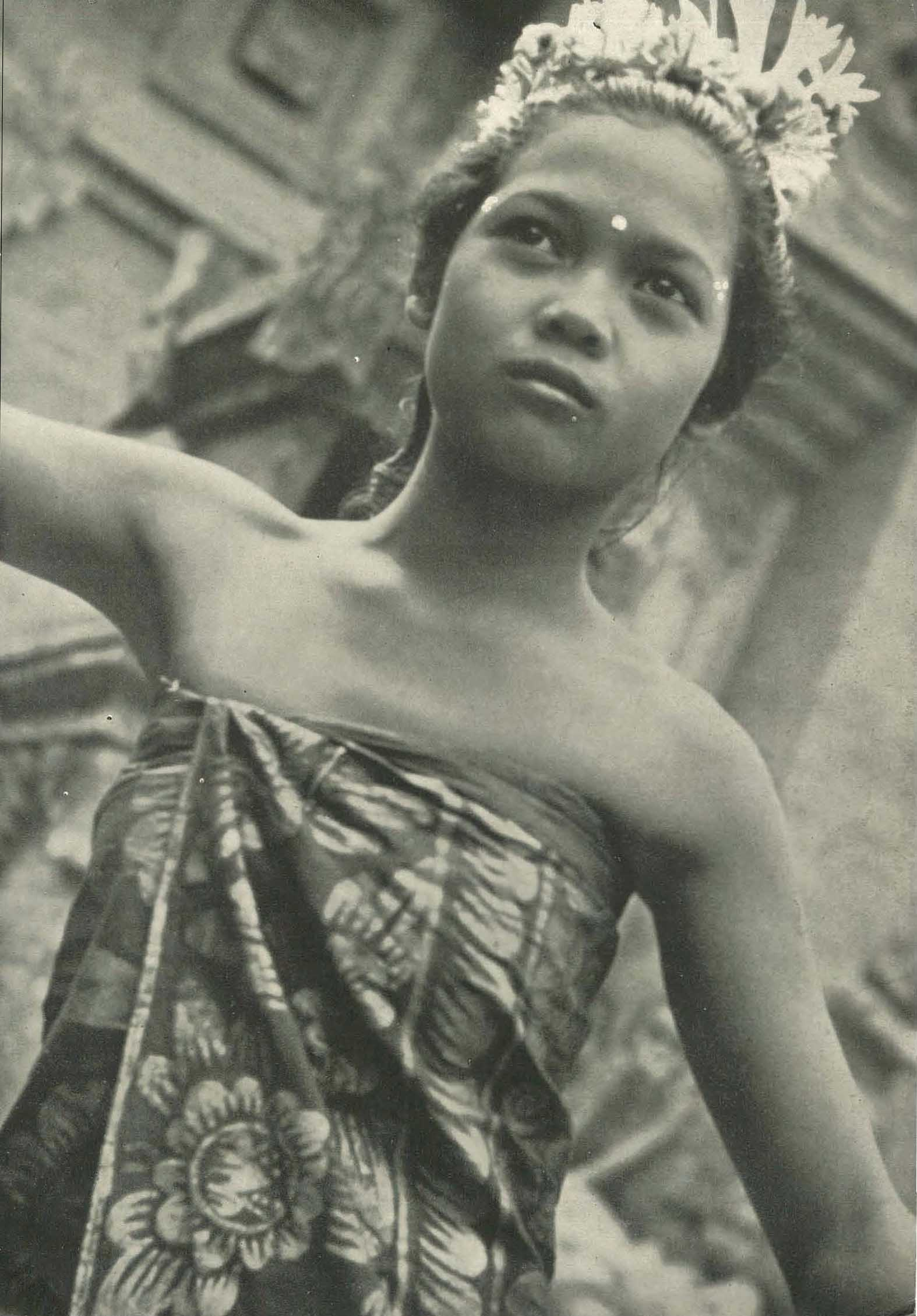
Indonesian dancer

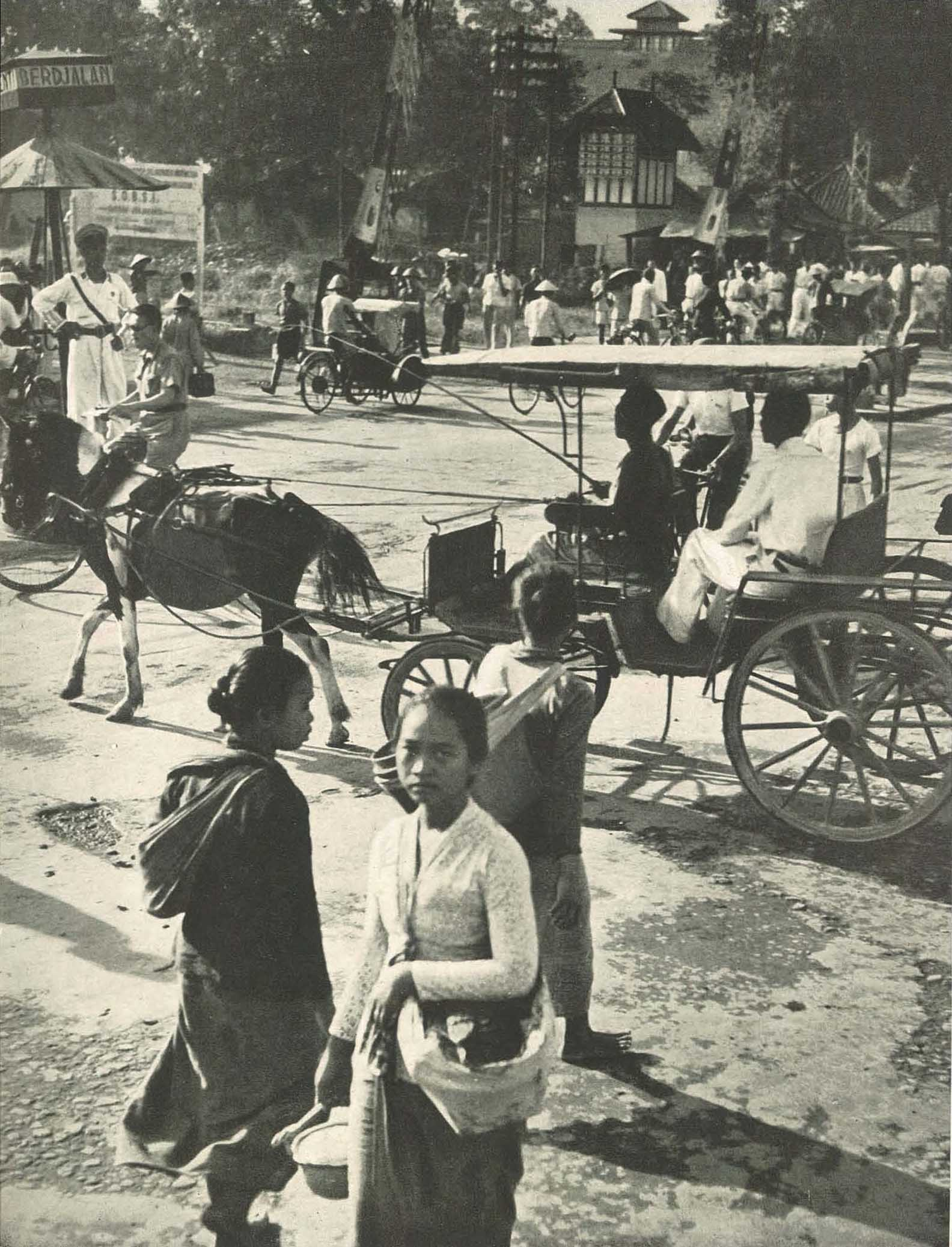
Streets of Yogyakarta

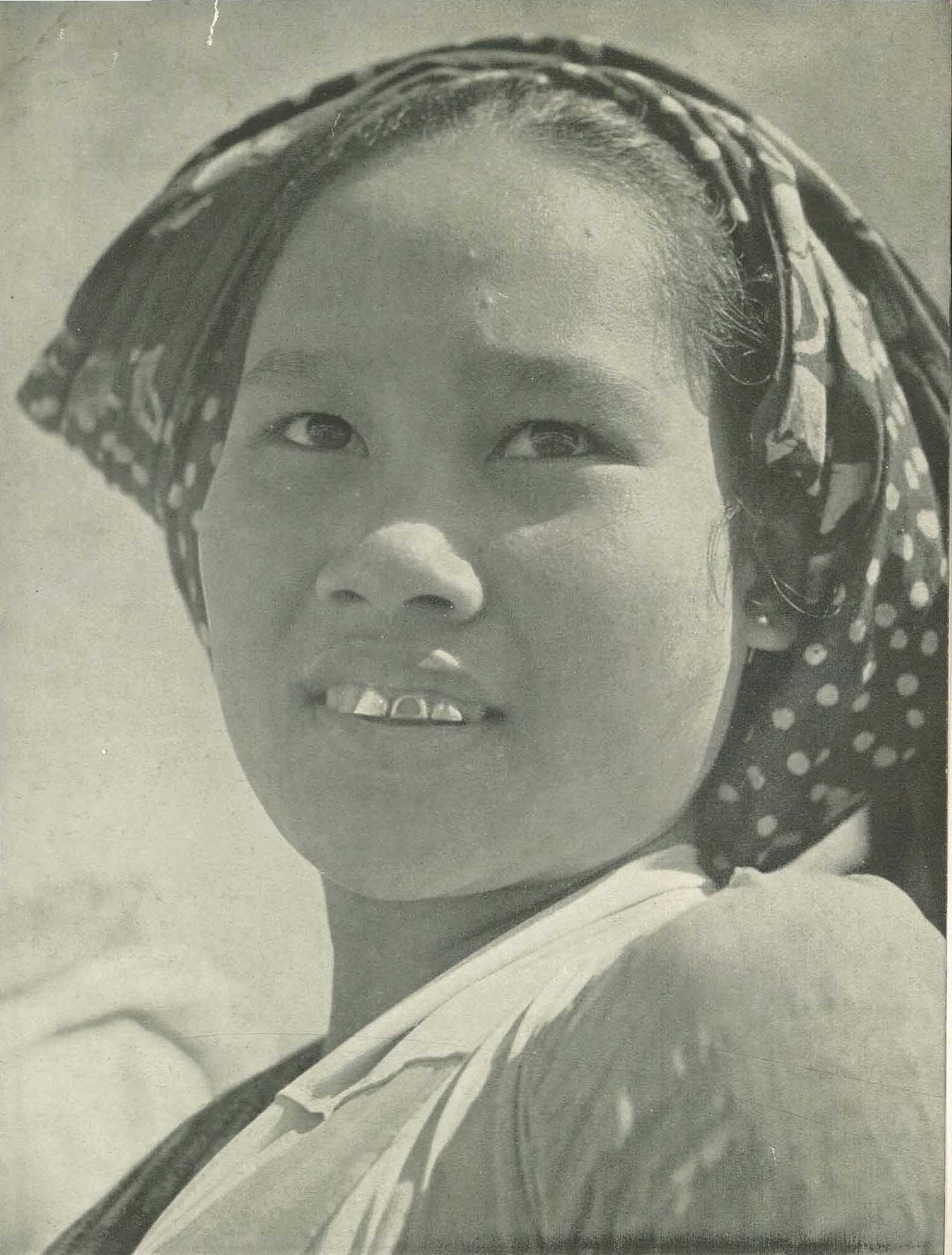
Peasant girl (Sunda)
