= Berhardina Midderigh-Bokhorst =

Dutch artist

- Born: Johanna Berhardina Bokhorst; 31 May 1880; Surabaya, Dutch East Indies (now Indonesia)
- Died: 20 June 1972 (aged 92); Wassenaar, the Netherlands
- Known for: Illustration
- Spouse: Jean-Jacques Midderigh (m. 1905; died in 1970)

Johanna Berhardina Midderigh-Bokhorst (1880–1972) was a Dutch illustrator.

== Biography ==
Midderigh-Bokhorst née Bokhorst was born on 31 May 1880 in Surabaya, a large city in the Dutch East Indies, where her father served in the East Indian army. Her family moved to the Netherlands following the death of the father. She attended the Royal Academy of Art, The Hague. In 1899 she began her career designing clothing, specifically for the Vereeniging voor Verbetering van Vrouwenkleeding (the Dutch Society for the Improvement of Women's Dress). Her first book illustration was for a children's book Heidekoninginnetje, Een klaviersprookje by Catharina van Rennes. She taught at the Dagtekenschool voor meisjes (English:Day drawing school for girls) and the Koninklijke Academie van Beeldende Kunsten (The Hague) (Royal Academy of Art, The Hague). Her students included Sijtje Aafjes and Mies Deinum.

In 1905 she married fellow artist Jean-Jacques Midderigh (1877-1970) with whom she had two children. Midderigh-Bokhorst continued her career, creating illustrations for children's books, magazines, fashion, and advertising. Midderigh-Bokhorst worked through her life, her last book Glans en gloed uit donkere diepten was published in 1955. The same year she painted murals for the agricultural school in Zoetermeer . She often collaborated with her husband. In 1910 she was received a gold medal at the Brussels Exposition Universelle et Internationale for book decoration. In 1913 her work was included in the exhibition De Vrouw 1813-1913.

Midderigh-Bokhorst was a member of Nederlandsche Vereeniging voor Ambachts- en Nijverheidskunst (V.A.N.K.) the Dutch Association for Craft and Craft Art. She was also a member of the Dutch Society for the Improvement of Women's Dress, and the Hague chapter of the Vereeniging voor Vrouwenkiesrecht (Dutch Association for Women's Suffrage).

Midderigh-Bokhorst died on 20 June 1972 in Wassenaar. Her work is in the Centraal Museum Utrecht.

postcard from the Elegances series c. 1919

postcard from the children's cards series c. 1919

postcard from the Au bain de mer series c. 1919
