= Sophie Verrijn Stuart =

Dutch artist

- Born: 18 April 1890; Amsterdam, the Netherlands
- Died: 14 August 1946 (aged 56); Amsterdam, the Netherlands
- Known for: Ceramics

Sophie Verrijn Stuart (1890–1946) was a Dutch ceramicist.

== Biography ==
Verrijn Stuart was born on 18 April 1890 in Amsterdam. She studied at Kunstnijverheidsschool Quellinus (Amsterdam) where she was a student of Bert Nienhuis. She taught at De Nieuwe Huishoudschool, and around 1928 she designed tableware for Plateelbakkerij Zuid-Holland. She worked as a potter in Amsterdam from 1926 until her death.

In 1925 Verrijn Stuart won an honorable mention at International Exhibition of Modern Decorative and Industrial Arts in Paris. Verrijn Stuart was a member of Nederlandsche Vereeniging voor Ambachts- en Nijverheidskunst (V.A.N.K.) the Dutch Association for Craft and Craft Art.

Verrijn Stuart died on 14 August 1946 in Amsterdam. Her work is in the collection of the Stedelijk Museum Amsterdam and the Kunstmuseum Den Haag.
