= Chris van der Hoef =

Dutch sculptor

Olympic medal record

Art competitions
Silver medal – second place	1928 Amsterdam	Sculpture

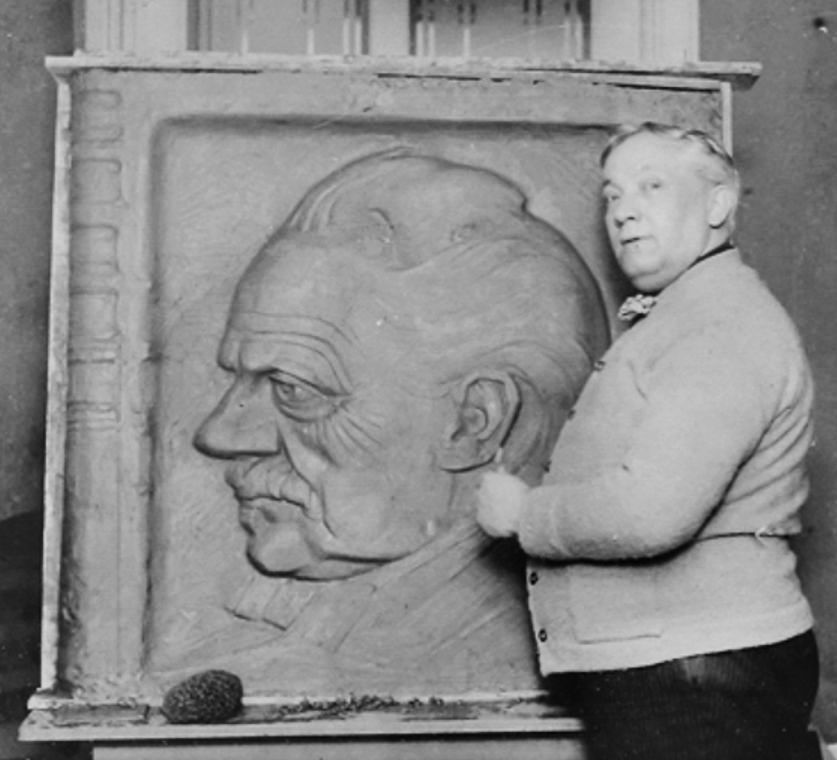
Chris van der Hoef in 1923.jpg

Christiaan "Chris" Johannes van der Hoef (11 May 1875 – 5 March 1933) was a Dutch sculptor. He was born in Amsterdam and died in The Hague. In 1928 he won a silver medal in the art competitions of the Olympic Games for his "Médaille pour les Jeux Olympiques" ("Olympic medals"). Van der Hoef was a member of Nederlandsche Vereeniging voor Ambachts- en Nijverheidskunst (V.A.N.K.) the Dutch Association for Craft and Craft Art.
