= Anna Sipkema =

Dutch artist and graphic designer

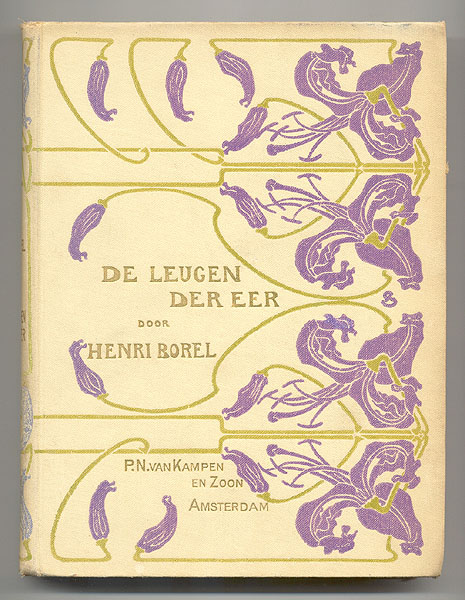
A cover, designed by Sipkema, for H. Borel's De leugen der eer. Published in 1903 by Van Kampen & Son.

Anna Sipkema (1877–1933) was a Dutch graphic designer and textile artist. She is known mainly today for her book covers and calendars.

== Early life and education ==
Sipkema was born in the village of Mensingeweer in the Groningen province of the Netherlands. Her family was devoutly Mennonite; her father was a minister. Sipkema studied at the Rijksnormaalschool voor Tekenonderwijzers in Amsterdam from 1894 to 1897, from the time she was seventeen until age twenty. Six years later, in 1903, she obtained her teaching certificate.

== Career ==
She began teaching at the Dagtekenen Kunstambachtsschool voor Meisjes (Day Drawing and Craft School for Girls in Amsterdam) in 1904. While teaching, Sipkema found work in Amsterdam as a commercial artist, designing calendars, illustrations, bindings, and covers for books coming from publishers such as C.A.J. van Dishoeck, G.B. van Good, P.H. van Kampen, and others, as well as her own batiks, woodcuts, and ceramics. She also exhibited and sold her work at galleries such as De Kerkuil gallery in Haarlem, where she sold textiles and cushions in 1925. After this period, she found work mainly as a weaver, hand weaving sometimes in very fine materials, like silk, and with Scandinavian influences In 1907 she became a full member of the Nederlandsche Vereeniging voor Ambachts- en Nijverheidskunst, or VANK, which she had been working towards since her application in 1905. Sipkema turned away from the literary world and focused on weaving at the end of the decade, in her personal work as well as her teaching, and would continue with that path until her death in 1933.

== Works ==
Sipkema is most widely remembered for her Art Nouveau flower-and-leaf calendars for the publishing house of C.A.J. van Dishoek and her bookbindings from the first decade of the twentieth century.
