= Sijtje Aafjes =

Dutch painter, draftswoman, and illustrator (1893–1972)

Sijtje Antje Agatha Johanna Aafjes was a Dutch painter, draftswoman, and illustrator, mainly of children's books.

== Biography ==
Aafjes was born in Amsterdam, Netherlands on 22 August 1893. Her parents were Margje van der Heijden (1871–1934) and Anthonius Pieter Aafjes (1864–1934). She had one older sister named Jo (1891–1972).

She began working as a kindergarten teacher at around age 20. In 1919, she worked in Katendrecht at the Openbare Bewaarschool aan de Tolhuisstraat. During her time teaching, she became a self-taught artist, making paintings and illustrations.

Aafjes' earlier works were signed with her full name, and later she signed using the monogram "SA". She illustrated children's books, postcards, and book jackets. She illustrated two self-written children's books, Voor broertjes en zusjes (1921), and Wie leest en kijkt mee, de versjes en prentjes van't ABC (1923). Between 1930 and 1933, she was an illustrator of Kie-ke-boe, a youth magazine.

She was mentored by the artist Berhardina Midderigh-Bokhorst, whom Aafjes was introduced to by a publisher. She also studied anatomy under Alexander van Maasdijk.

Aafjes died in Rotterdam on 16 April 1972, at age 78. Her work is held in the collections of the Rijksmuseum, Museum Meermanno, and Literatuurmuseum (originally the Letterkundig Museum).
