= List of Dutch women artists =

This is a list of women artists who were born in the Netherlands or whose artworks are closely associated with that country.

== A ==
- Marijke Abels (born 1948), sculptor
- Anna Adelaïde Abrahams (1848–1930), still life painter
- Annie Abrahams (born 1954), performance and video artist
- Betzy Akersloot-Berg (1850–1922), Norwegian-born painter
- Marie van Regteren Altena (1868–1958), painter
- Lizzy Ansingh (1875–1959), painter
- Thérèse Ansingh who used the pseudonym Sorella (1883–1968), painter
- Henriëtte Asscher (1858–1933), painter

== B ==
- Sara van Baalbergen (1607–after 1638), Golden Age painter
- Tine Baanders (1890–1971), illustrator, graphic designer, typographer, lithographer
- Catharina Backer (1689–1766), painter
- Maria Geertruida Barbiers (1801–1879), painter
- Marjolein Bastin (born 1943), children's writer, illustrator
- Jo Bauer-Stumpff (1873–1964), painter
- Hanneke Beaumont (born 1947), sculptor
- Euphrosine Beernaert (1831–1901), landscape painter
- Ans van den Berg (1873–1942), painter
- Else Berg (1877–1942), Polish-born Dutch painter
- Helen Berman (born 1936), painter
- Jeanne Bieruma Oosting (1898–1994) sculptor, engraver, graphic artist, lithographer, illustrator, glass artist, painter, illustrator and book designer
- Marie Bilders-van Bosse (1837–1900), landscape painter
- Anke Birnie (born 1943), sculptor
- Kate Bisschop-Swift (1834–1928), painter
- Saskia Boddeke (born 1962), multimedia artist and theatre director
- Nelly Bodenheim (1874–1951), illustrator
- Cornelia toe Boecop (1551 – after 1629), painter
- Margaretha toe Boecop (c. 1551 – after 1574), painter
- Frederika Henriëtte Broeksmit (1875–1945), painter, printmaker, peace activist
- Margaretha Cornelia Boellaard (1795–1872), painter, lithographer
- Manon de Boer (born 1966), video artist
- Marike Bok (1943–2017), painter
- Elisabeth Bol-Smit (1904–1987), painter
- Emilie Boon (fl. 1883–), children's writer and illustrator
- Maaike Braat-Rolvink (1879–1959), painter
- Hetty Broedelet-Henkes (1878–1949), painter
- Gesina ter Borch (1633–1690), Golden Age painter
- Adriënne Broeckman-Klinkhamer (1876–1976), painter, illustrator, and textile artist
- Hildegard Brom-Fischer (1908–2001), textile artist
- Coosje van Bruggen (1942–2009), sculptor and art historian
- Johanna Aleida Budde (1800–1852), painter and draughtswoman
- Annie Bruin (1870–1961), painter

== C ==
- Mies Callenfels-Carsten (1893–1982), painter
- Christina Chalon (1748–1808), painter and etcher
- Cornelia Cnoop (1449–1499), miniaturist
- Mayken Coecke (c.1545–1578), painter
- Els Coppens-van de Rijt (born 1943), painter, writer
- Marie Cremers (1874–1960), painter, lithographer, graphic artist, illustrator
- Susanna de La Croix (1756–1789), painter

== D ==
- Jenny Dalenoord (1918–2013), illustrator
- Rachel van Dantzig (1878–1949), sculptor
- Amie Dicke (born 1978), visual artist specializing in cut-outs from fashion magazines
- Emmy Dinkel-Keet (1908–2003), painter, illustrator
- Sophie van der Does de Willebois (1891–1961), ceramist
- Nelly van Doesburg (1899–1975), dancer, painter
- Cécile Dreesmann (1920–1994), textile artist
- Wilhelmina Drupsteen (1880–1966), illustrator
- Marie Duchatel (1652–1692), painter
- Debora Duyvis (1874–1960), illustrator, engraver
- Lize Duyvis (1889–1964), painter

== E ==
- Stien Eelsingh (1903–1964), painter
- Christina Maria Elliger (1731–1802), painter
- Catharina Jacoba Abrahamina Enschedé (1828–1883), painter
- Christina Gerarda Enschedé (1791–1873), painter
- Titia Ex (born 1959) (fl. 2013–), conceptual artist
- Johanna van Eybergen (1865–1950), applied artist and designer

== F ==
- Maria Margaretha la Fargue (1738–1793), painter
- Maria Faydherbe (1587–1643), sculptor
- Etha Fles (1857–1948), painter, printmaker, critic
- Anna Folkema (1695–1768), engraver
- Marianna Franken (1928–2025), ceramicist, potter
- Marianne Franken (1884–1945), painter
- Aletta de Frey (1768–1808), painter

== G ==
- Lotti van der Gaag (1923–1999), sculptor, painter
- Hendrika van Gelder (1870–1943), painter
- Julia Giesberts (1893–1983), painter, printmaker
- Agnieta Gijswijt (1873–1962), painter
- Diana Glauber (1650–c.1721), Golden Age painter
- Margaretha van Godewijk (1627–1677), Golden Age painter
- Nelly Goedewaagen (1880–1953), painter
- Marijke de Goey (born 1947), visual artist, sculptor
- Sárika Goth (1880–1953), painter
- Dorothea Maria Graff (1678–1743), painter
- Lina Gratama (1875–1946), painter
- Maria de Grebber (1602–1680), Golden Age painter
- Aleida Greve (1670–1742), painter
- Anita Groener (born 1958), painter and illustrator
- Mieke Groot (born 1949), glass artist
- Greet Grottendieck (born 1943), sculptor

== H ==
- Adriana Johanna Haanen (1814–1895), painter
- Elisabeth Alida Haanen (1809–1845), painter
- Margaretha Haverman (c.1693–after 1739), flower painter
- Jacoba van Heemskerck (1876–1923), painter, stained-glass artist
- Margaretha de Heer (1603–1665), Golden Age painter
- P. van Heerdt tot Eversberg-Quarles van Ufford (1862–1939), feminist, artist, and peace activist
- Jeanne van Heeswijk (born 1965), visual artist and curator
- Annie van der Heide (1896–1968), sculptor
- Marie Heijermans (1859–1937), painter
- Marie Heineken (1844–1930), painter
- Catharina van Hemessen (1528–after 1587), painter
- Alida Sophia Hendriks (1901–1984), painter
- Milou Hermus (1947–2021), painter
- Johanna Helena Herolt (1668–1723), German-born painter
- Roeloffina van Heteren-Vink (1875–1971), painter
- Geertruida van Hettinga Tromp (1872–1962), painter
- Jemmy van Hoboken (1900–1962), painter
- Anna Cornelia Holt (1671–1692), painter
- Louise van Holthe tot Echten (1892–1981), painter
- Sophia Holt (1658–1734), painter
- Tine Honig (1894–1957), painter
- Maria Ida Adriana Hoogendijk (1874–1942), painter
- Ina Hooft (1894–1994), painter
- Berthe Hoola van Nooten (1817–1892), botanical illustrator
- Antonina Houbraken (1686–1736), draughtswoman
- Christina Houbraken (1695–1760s), painter
- Alida van Houten (1868–1960), painter
- Barbara Elisabeth van Houten (1863–1950), painter
- Antoinette van Hoytema (1875–1967), painter
- Bramine Hubrecht (1855–1913), painter, etcher and illustrator
- Henriette Hubregtse-Lanzing (1879–1959), painter, etcher
- Arina Hugenholtz (1848–1934), painter
- Cornelia Aletta van Hulst (1797–1870), painter
- Frieda Hunziker (1908–1966), painter
- Francina Margaretha van Huysum (1707–1789), flower painter

== I ==
- Wilhelmina van Idsinga (1788–1819), painter
- Lucie van Dam van Isselt (1871–1949), flower painter
- Olga van Iterson-Knoepfle (1879–1961), painter

== J ==
- Adrienne van Hogendorp-s' Jacob (1857–1920), still life painter
- Mirjam Jacobson (1887–1945), painter
- Marie de Jonge (1872–1951), painter
- Claudy Jongstra (born 1963), artist and textile designer

== K ==
- Dorry Kahn-Weyl (1896–1981), painter
- Henriette Agnete Kitty von Kaulbach (1900–1992), German-Dutch painter
- Lucie Keijser (1875–1958), painter
- Judy Michiels van Kessenich (1901–1972), painter
- Helena Klakocar (born 1958), cartoonist
- Nel Klaassen (1906–1989), sculptor
- Lorena Kloosterboer (born 1962), Dutch-Argentine painter and sculptor
- Nel Kluitman (1879–1961), painter, sculptor
- Catharina van Knibbergen (1630–1675), Golden Age landscape painter
- Henriëtte Geertruida Knip (1783–1842), flower painter
- Rie Knipscheer (1911–2003), painter
- Elise Thérèse Koekkoek-Daiwaille (1814–1881), painter, lithographer
- Joanna Koerten (1650–1715), painter, embroiderer, glass etcher
- Anna Maria de Koker (1666–1698), printmaker and poet
- Elisabeth Johanna Koning (1816–1887), still life painter
- Jo Koster (1868–1944), painter
- Gunhild Kristensen (1919–2002), stained glass artist
- Jo Kruyder-Bouman (1886–1973), painter, illustrator
- Andrea Kruis (born 1962), illustrator
- Marina Kulik (born 1956), painter

== L ==
- Juliana Cornelia de Lannoy (1738–1782), artist and poet
- Coba van der Lee (1893–1972), painter
- Anna Lehmann (1876–1956), painter and etcher
- Judith Leyster (1609–1660), Golden Age painter
- Mechtelt van Lichtenberg (c.1520–1598), painter
- Lou Loeber (1867–1952), painter
- Ien Lucas (born 1955), artist
- Ans Luttge-Deetman (1867–1952), painter

== M ==
- Tjaarke Maas (1974–2004), painter
- Karin Mader (1910–1973), painter
- Mien Marchant (1866–1952), painter
- Henriëtte Marcus (1891–1993), painter
- Grada Hermina Marius (1854–1919), writer and painter
- Ans Markus (born 1947), painter
- Cornelia van Marle (1661–1699), Golden Age painter
- Eva van Marle (fl. 1640s–1650s), Golden Age painter
- Alberta Johanna Meijer-Smetz (1893–1953), painter
- Christien Meindertsma (born 1980), artist
- Geesje Mesdag-van Calcar (1850–1936), painter
- Sina Mesdag-van Houten (1834–1909), painter
- Berhardina Midderigh-Bokhorst (1880–1972), illustrator
- Kitty van der Mijll Dekker (1908–2004), textile artist
- Agatha van der Mijn (1700–1776/1796), flower painter
- Cornelia van der Mijn (1709–1782), flower painter
- Wally Moes (1856–1918), genre painter, writer
- Ro Mogendorff (1907–1969), painter
- Marie Molijn (1837–1932), painter
- Phemia Molkenboer (1883–1940), ceramist
- Maria Moninckx (1673–1757), botanical artist
- Pauline Johanna Gesine Mouthaan(1892–?), painter
- Charlotte Mutsaers (born 1942), painter, writer

== N ==
- Jacoba Maria van Nickelen (c.1690–1749), flower painter
- Jacqueline Marguerite van Nie (1897–1983), painter
- Henriëtte Gesina Numans (1877–1955), painter

== O ==
- Yvonne Oerlemans (1945–2012), sculptor, installation artist
- Willemina Ogterop (1881–1974), Dutch-American stained-glass artist
- Saskia Olde Wolbers (born 1971), video artist
- Wendelien van Oldenborgh (born 1962), installation artist, painter and video artist
- Maria Jacoba Ommeganck (1760–1849), animal painter
- Adri Bleuland van Oordt (1862–1944), painter and illustrator
- Johanna Bleuland van Oordt (1865–1948), painter
- Anuska Oosterhuis (born 1978), media artist
- Suze Oosterhuis-van der Stok (1910–1989), ceramicist
- Maria van Oosterwijck (1630–1693), Golden Age painter
- Catharina Oostfries (1636–1708), Golden Age glass painter
- Jeanne Bieruma Oosting (1898–1994), sculptor, engraver, illustrator and painter
- Maria Margaretha van Os (1779–1862), flower painter
- Hinke Osinga (born 1969), mathematician and mathematical artist
- Nancy van Overveldt (1930–2015), painter

== P ==
- Corrie Pabst (1866–1943), painter
- Charlotte van Pallandt (1898–1997), painter, sculptor
- Helena Christina van de Pavord Smits (1867–1941), botanical illustrator
- Magdalena van de Passe (1600–1638), engraver
- Henriëtta van Pee (1692–1741), painter
- Gertrude de Pélichy (1743–1825), painter
- Henriëtte Pessers (1899–1986), painter
- Adri Pieck (1894–1982), painter
- Gretha Pieck (1898–1920), painter
- Johanna Pieneman (1889–1986), painter
- Magdalena Pietersz (before 1560–after 1592), painter
- Charlotte Pothuis (1867–1945), painter
- Alida Jantina Pott (1888–1931), painter
- Augusta Preitinger (1878–1946), painter

== R ==
- Cecilia Maria Elisabeth de Ranitz (1880–1970), painter
- Adriana van Ravenswaay (1816–1872), painter
- Etie van Rees (1879–1959), ceramist
- Adya van Rees-Dutilh (1876–1959), textile artist
- Betsy Repelius (1848–1921), painter and watercolorist
- Henriëtte Johanna Reuchlin-Lucardie (1877–1970), painter
- Cornelia de Rijck (1653–1726), bird painter
- Coba Ritsema (1876–1961), portrait painter
- Suze Robertson (1855–1922), painter
- Catharina Julia Roeters van Lennep (1813–1883), painter
- Geertruydt Roghman (1625–1657), Golden Age painter
- Magdalena Roghman (1637–1679), Golder Age engraver
- Henriëtte Ronner-Knip (1821–1909), animal painter
- Margaretha Roosenboom (1843–1896), flower painter
- Katharina Rozee (1632–1682), Golden Age embroiderer
- Aletta Ruijsch (1860–1930), painter
- Anna Ruysch (1666–1741), Golden Age flower painter
- Rachel Ruysch (1664–1750), still life painter

== S ==
- Sara Saftleven (1645–1702), Golden Age flower painter
- Gerardina Jacoba van de Sande Bakhuyzen (1826–1895), painter
- Riek Schagen (1913–2008), actress, painter
- Maria Schalcken (1645–1699), Golden Age painter
- Cornelia Scheffer (1769–1839), miniaturist portrait painter
- Elisabeth Barbara Schmetterling (1801–1882), printmaker, illustrator and miniaturist
- Lara Schnitger (born 1969), Dutch-American sculptor and painter
- Maaike Schoorel (born 1973), painter
- Lique Schoot (born 1969), visual artist
- Lizzy Schouten (1887–1967), painter
- Lydia Schouten (born 1948), performance and video artist
- Anna Maria van Schurman (1607–1678), engraver, painter, writer
- Georgine Schwartze (1854–1935), sculptor
- Thérèse Schwartze (1851–1918), portrait painter
- Bertha thoe Schwartzenberg (1891–1993), sculptor
- Maria Adeline Alice Schweistal or Fanny Psicha (1864–1950), Belgium-born Dutch painter
- Suze Slager-Velsen (1883–1964), painter
- Marleen Sleeuwits (born 1980), photographer and installation artist
- Carolein Smit (born 1960), ceramic art sculptor
- Maria Geertruida Snabilie (1776–1838), painter
- Ellen Spijkstra (born 1957), ceramic artist
- Adriana Spilberg (1652–1700), Dutch Golden Age painter
- Pietertje van Splunter (born 1968), painter
- Susanna van Steenwijk (1601–1664), architectural painter
- Hilda van Stockum (1908–2006), children's writer, painter and illustrator
- Agnes van Stolk (1898–1980), painter
- Pauline Suij (1863–1949), painter
- Jacoba Surie (1879–1970), painter
- Maria Machteld van Sypesteyn (1724–1774), painter

== T ==
- Thamine Tadama-Groeneveld (1871–1938), painter
- Levina Teerlinc (1510–1576), miniaturist
- Judith Ten Bosch (born 1957), painter and illustrator
- Maria Tesselschade Visscher (1594–1649), poet and engraver
- Maria Theresia van Thielen (1640–1706), painter
- Moniek Toebosch (1948–2012), installation artist
- Bartha Hermina Tollius (1780–1847), amateur pastellist
- Elisabeth Tonnard (born 1973), artist and poet
- Charley Toorop (1891–1955), painter, lithographer
- Marit Törnqvist (born 1964), Swedish-Dutch illustrator
- Sara Troost (1732–1803), painter

== V ==
- Bertha Valkenburg (1862–1929), painter
- Apollonia van Veen (died 1635), pastellist
- Julie van der Veen (1903–1997), painter, engraver and illustrator
- Margaretha C. Verheus (1905–1990), painter
- Mayken Verhulst (1518–1599), miniature, tempera and watercolor painter
- Sophie Verrijn Stuart (1890–1946) ceramicist
- Philipine Vinke (born 1968), artist
- Anna Visscher (1584–1651), artist, poet and translator
- Barbara Visser (born 1966), contemporary artist
- Tula Marina di Vista (1888–1969), artist and writer
- Tilly Münninghoff-van Vliet (1879–1960), painter
- Maria Vos (1824–1906), still-life painter
- Madelon Vriesendorp (born 1945), painter

== W ==
- Marie Wandscheer (1856–1936), painter
- Marie van Waning-Stevels (1874–1943), painter
- Elisabeth Geertruida Wassenbergh (1729–1781), painter
- Catharina Elisabeth Wassink (1879–1960), painter
- Gisèle d'Ailly van Waterschoot van der Gracht (1912–2013), painter
- Saskia Weishut-Snapper (born 1938), fiber artist
- Maria Weenix (1697–1774), painter
- Clara Adriana van der Werff (1895–1962), painter
- Joanna Wichmann (1905–1985), German-born textile artist and embroiderer in Amsterdam
- Maria de Wilde (1682–1729), playwright and engraver
- Marie Willeboordse (1902–1989), painter
- Victoire Wirix (1875–1938), painter
- Alida Withoos (c.1661–1730), botanical artist
- Maria Withoos (1663–after 1699), Golden Age painter
- Petronella van Woensel (1785–1839), painter
- Aleijda Wolfsen (1648–1692), Golden Age painter
- Ans Wortel (1929–1996), painter, poet and writer
- Elsa Woutersen-van Doesburgh (1875–1957), painter
- Margaretha Wulfraet (1678–1760), painter
- Gonda Wulfse (1896–1979), painter
- Marie Wuytiers (1865–1944), painter
- Geertgen Wyntges (1636–1712), flower painter

== Y ==
- Hannah Yakin (born 1933), Dutch-Israeli artist and writer
- Catharina Ykens (1659–1737), Flemish still life painter

== Z ==
- Agatha Zethraeus (1872–1966), painter

== See also ==
- List of Dutch women photographers
