= Pieck (surname) =

Pieck is a Dutch surname. Notable people with the surname include:

- Adri Pieck (1894–1982), Dutch artist
- Anton Pieck (1895–1987), Dutch painter, artist and graphic artist
- Arthur Pieck (1899–1970), Communist Party of Germany politician
- Gretha Pieck (1898–1920), Dutch artist
- Henri Pieck (1895–1972), Dutch architect, painter and graphic artist
- Nicholas Pieck (1534–1572), Dutch Roman Catholic saint
- Wilhelm Pieck (1876–1960), German communist politician
