= Oosterhuis =

Oosterhuis is a Dutch surname meaning "eastern house". Notable people with the surname include:

- Allard Oosterhuis (1902–1967), Dutch resistance hero during World War II
- Anuska Oosterhuis (born 1978), Dutch media artist
- Huub Oosterhuis (1933–2023), Dutch theologian, poet and former Catholic priest; father of Tjeerd and Trijntje
- Jon Oosterhuis (born 1977), Canadian football fullback
- Kas Oosterhuis (born 1951), Dutch architect
- Peter Oosterhuis (1948–2024), English golfer
- Tjeerd Oosterhuis (born 1971), Dutch musician and producer, brother of Trijntje
- Trijntje Oosterhuis (born 1973), Dutch singer and songwriter, sister of Tjeerd

== See also ==
- Oostershuis, a building in Antwerp and a headquarters of the Hanseatic League, erected about 1560 and destroyed by fire in 1893.
