= Goedewaagen =

Goedewaagen is a surname. Notable people with the surname include:

- Nelly Goedewaagen (1880–1953), Dutch artist
- Tobie Goedewaagen (1895–1980), Dutch philosopher and politician
