= Van Dantzig =

van Dantzig is a surname. Notable people with the surname include:

- David van Dantzig (1900–1959), Dutch mathematician
- Rachel van Dantzig (1878–1949), Dutch sculptor
- Rudi van Dantzig (1933–2012), Dutch choreographer and writer
