= Charlotte van Pallandt =

Dutch painter and sculptor (1898–1997)

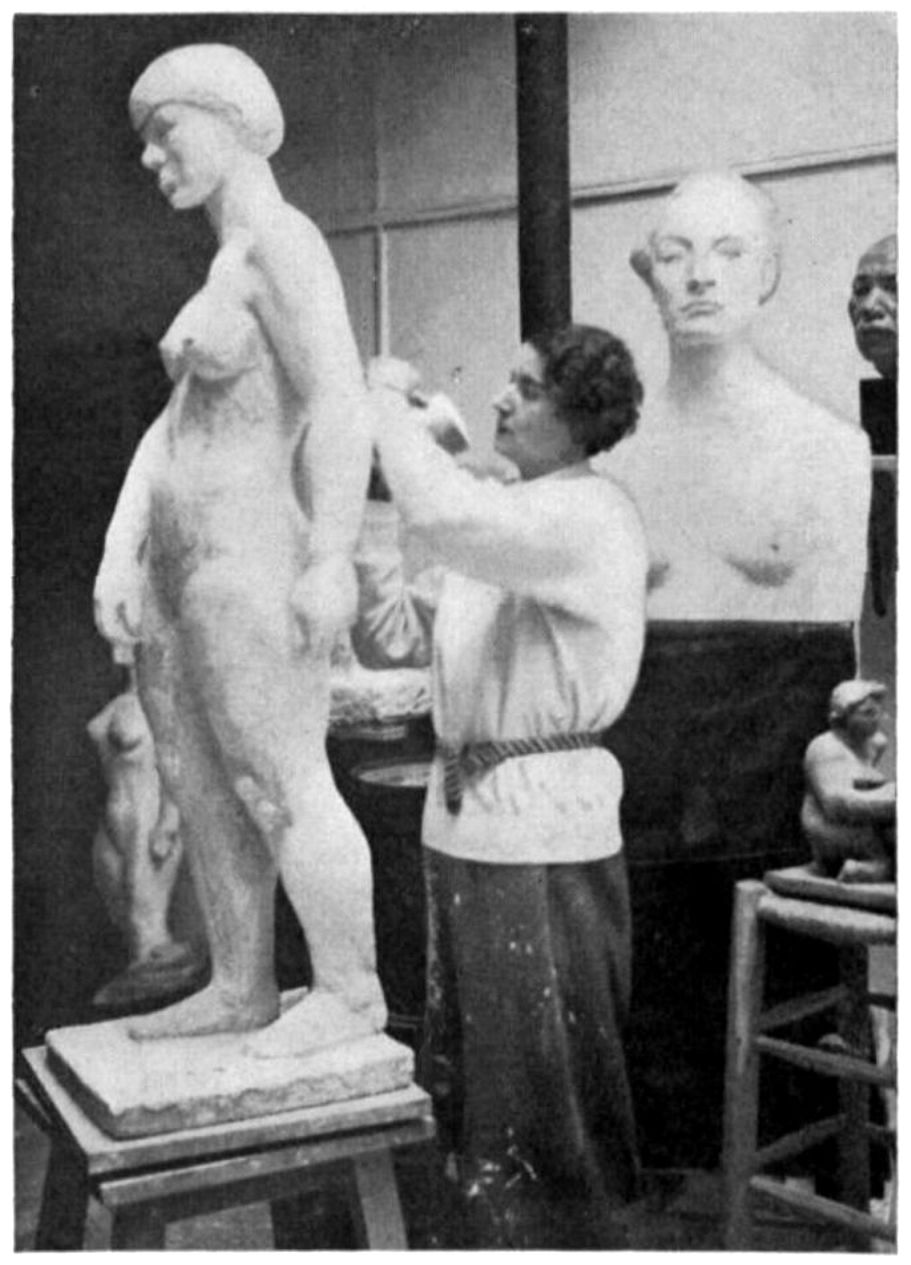
- Pallandt c. 1938
- Born: 24 September 1898; Arnhem, Gelderland, Netherlands
- Died: 30 July 1997 (aged 98); Noordwijk, South Holland, Netherlands
- Education: Ealing School of Art
- Occupations: Painter; sculptor
- Spouse(s): Joachim Adolph Zeyger, Count of Rechteren-Limpurg (m. 1919; div. 1924)
- Awards: Order of Orange-Nassau (1963)

Charlotte Dorothée van Pallandt (24 September 1898 – 30 July 1997) was a Dutch noblewoman, painter and sculptor.

== Biography ==
She was born in Arnhem to a wealthy Pallandt family, belonging an old Dutch nobility, and grew up in Schaarsbergen with her three sisters and a brother.

In 1910 her older sister died of peritonitis and her family moved to the Hague in 1913 and sent her to a boarding school in London, where she studied at the Ealing School of Art. When she returned to The Hague she continued her drawing lessons with the painter Albert Roelofs and became a member of the Pulchri Studio.

On 18 September 1919 she married Joachim Adolph Zeyger, Count of Recteren-Limpurg (1893-1943) and settled with him in Bern, though they divorced in 1924.

After her divorce she moved to Lausanne and traveled with a friend to Paris, where she became a pupil of André Lhote in 1926 and was heavily influenced by his Cubism. During a break from school, she worked with Toon Dupuis in his workshop in the Hague and began sculpting. In 1928 she traveled around Italy and met the sculptors Albert Termote, Charles Despiau and Charles Malfray.

From 1929 she stopped painting and took up sculpting as her main form of expression, working mostly in Amsterdam except for a year at the Académie Ranson as a pupil of Malfray in Paris in 1935. She won second prize at the Paris Exposition of 1937 for a portrait of her nephew Serge.

When World War II began she moved back north and settled in Amsterdam in 1941 where she met the sculptors Piet Esser, Paul Grégoire, Cor Hund and Fred Carasso. Like them, she was a member of Arti et Amicitiae, and the NKVB (Dutch circle of sculptors). Through Carasso she met Truus Trompert, a nude model that served to inspire a series of "Truus-beeldjes". In 1948 she had her first exhibition at the gallery of Santee Landweer in Amsterdam, and thus experienced her break-through at age 50.

She was a founding member of "De Zeester", a circle of women artists that included Jeanne Bieruma Oosting, Maaike Braat, Jeanne van Hall, Fri Heil, Ro Mogendorff and Liesbeth Dobbelmann.

== Career ==
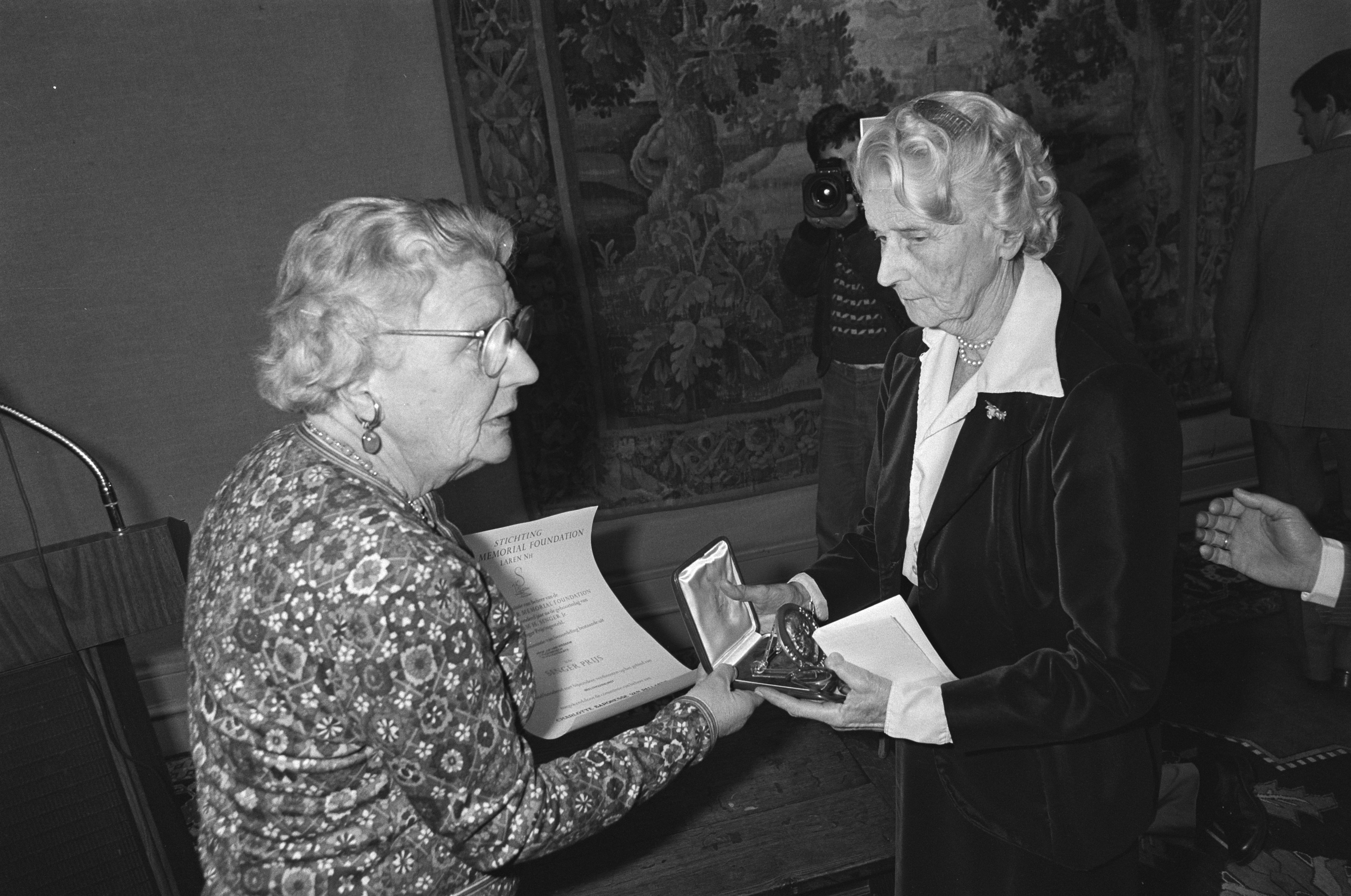
Charlotte van Pallandt receiving the Singer Prize from Princess Juliana of the Netherlands in 1977

She is known for her portraits, which are mostly busts. In 1958 she was one of the Dutch representatives to the Venice Biennale and a year later she won the Prix de la Critique. When the Haarlem sculptor Mari Andriessen introduced her to the Haarlem painter Kees Verwey they became friends and the bust portrait she made of him in 1961 is in the collection of the Frans Hals museum. He also made a portrait of her in 1963. She also made portraits of Queen Juliana, Peter Scharoff, Adriaan Roland Holst, Fred Carasso, Ro Mogendorff and Albert Termote. In 1963 she was awarded the title Ridder in de Orde van Oranje-Nassau and in 1968 her portrait of Queen Wilhelmina was unveiled in Rotterdam, which was later reordered for The Hague and Museum de Fundatie in Heino. In 1973 she was honored again with the title "Officier in de Orde van Oranje-Nassau".

She died in Noordwijk. The "Charlotte van Pallandt-prijs", awarded by the Charlotte van Pallandt Foundation, is a yearly prize for promising young sculptors.
