= Marie Wuytiers =

Dutch artist (1865–1944)

- Born: Anna Maria Blaauw; 29 November 1865; Amsterdam, Netherlands
- Died: 10 March 1944 (aged 78); Hilterfingen, Switzerland
- Other name: Anna Maria Barchman Wuytiers-Blaauw
- Known for: Painting
- Spouse: Jhr Barchman Wuytiers

Anna Maria Barchman Wuytiers-Blaauw (1865-1944) was a Dutch painter.

== Biography ==
Wuytiers née Blaauw was born on 29 November 1865 in Amsterdam, Netherlands. She studied flower painting under Margaretha Roosenboom. She married Jhr Barchman Wuytiers in 1890. She was a member of Arti et Amicitiae and Kunstenaarsvereniging Sint Lucas.

Wuytiers died on 10 March 1944 in Hilterfingen, Switzerland.

== Gallery ==
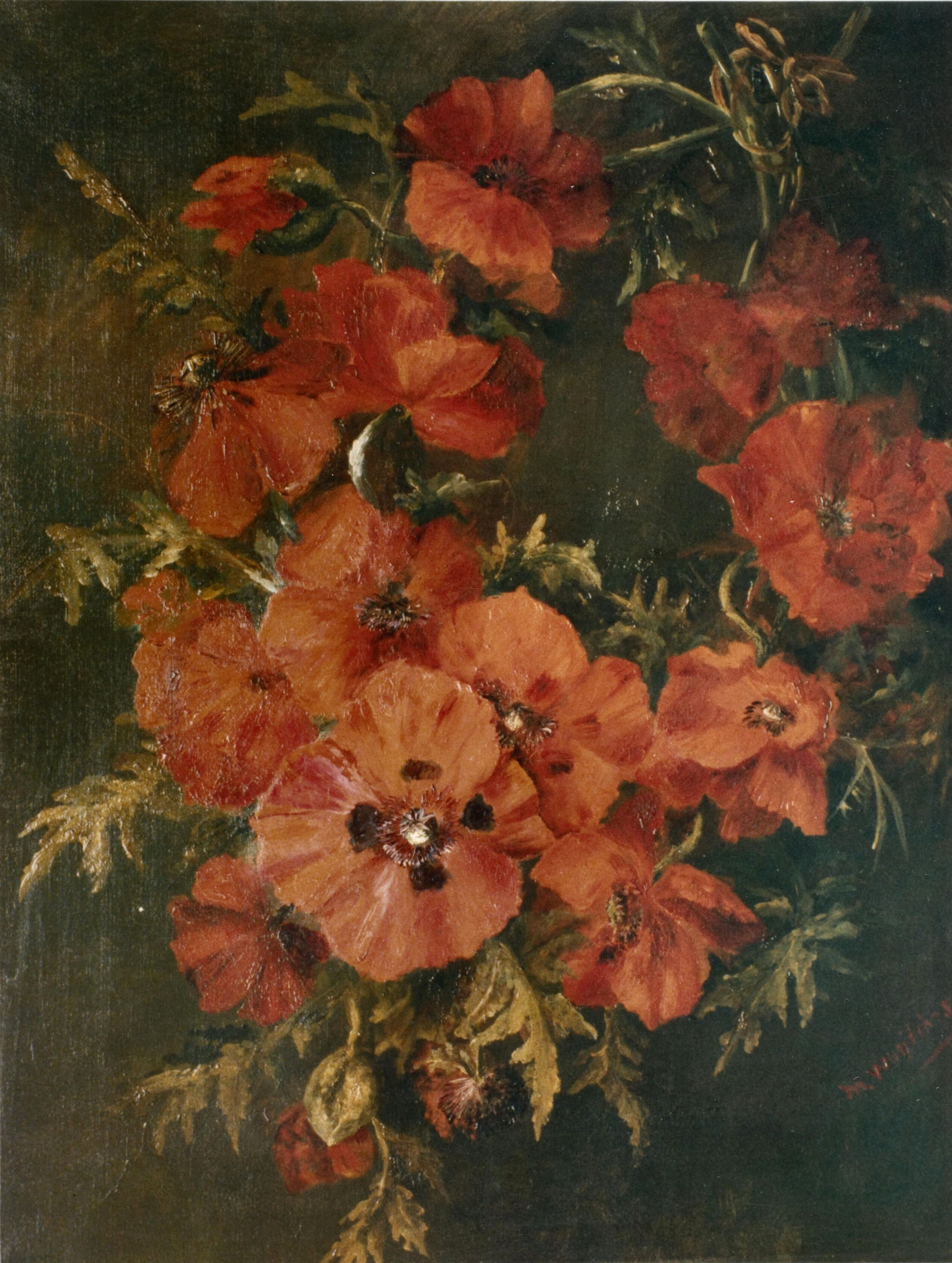
Stilleven met anemonen

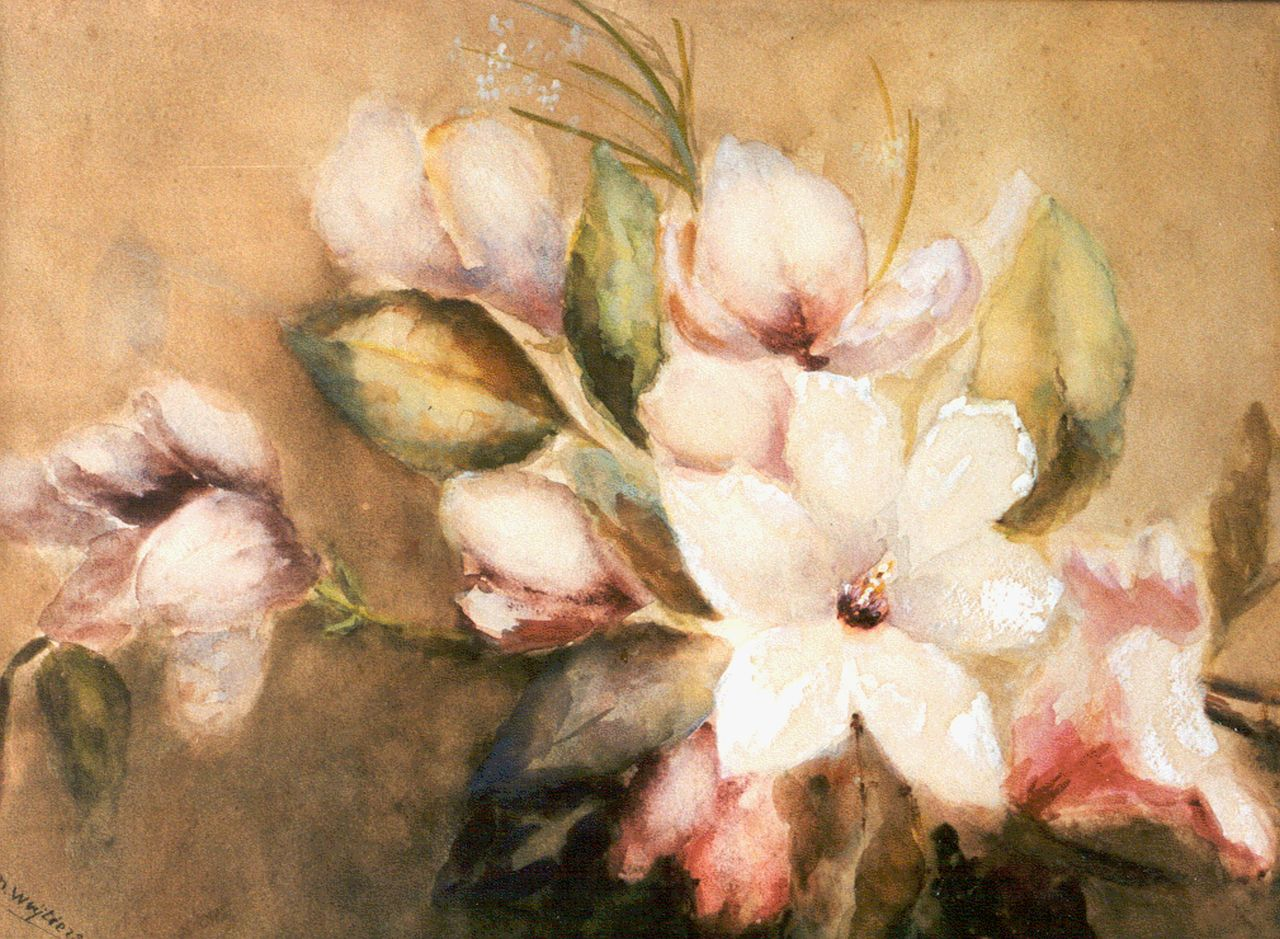
Magnoliatak
