= Charlotte Pothuis =

Dutch painter (1867–1945)

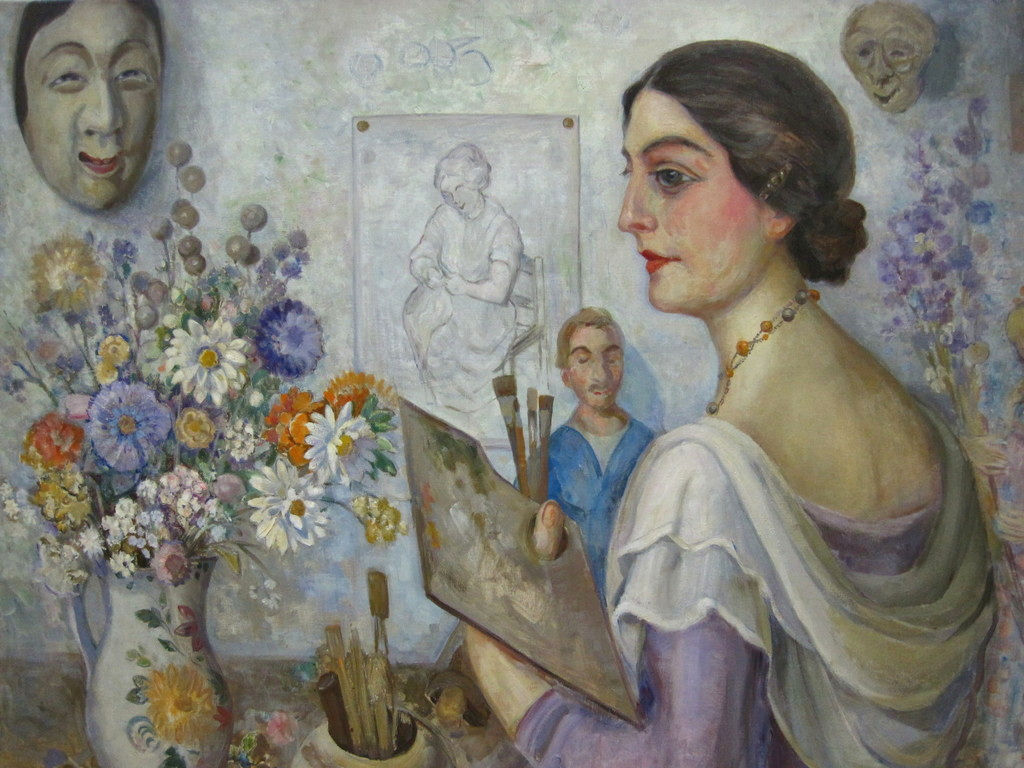
- Born: 1 April 1867; London, England
- Died: 24 January 1945 (aged 77); Amsterdam, Netherlands
- Other name: Charlotte Boom-Pothuis
- Known for: Painting, Photography
- Spouse: Karel Alexander August Jan Boom

Charlotte Pothuis (1 April 1867 – 24 January 1945) was a Dutch painter.

== Biography ==
Pothuis was born on 1 April 1867 in London, England. She studied at the Dagtekenschool voor meisjes (English:Day drawing school for girls) in Amsterdam. She also received instruction from Henriëtte Asscher, Meijer de Haan, Wilhelmina Cornelia Kerlen, Bartol Wilhelm van Laar, and Jan Zürcher. In 1891 she married fellow artist Karel Alexander August Jan Boom (1862-1943). She was a member of the Vereeniging Sint Lucas Amsterdam (Amsterdam Artists Association of Sint Lucas) and the Arti et Amicitiae artist's society. Pothuis' work was included in the 1939 exhibition and sale Onze Kunst van Heden (Our Art of Today) at the Rijksmuseum in Amsterdam.

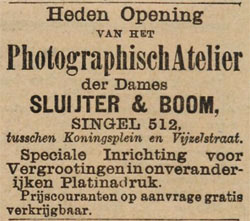
Dames Sluijter & Boom advertisement 1896

In June 1896 she opened a photography studio with her colleague Anna Sluijter. They called their studio Dames Sluijter & Boom and it is considered one of the first woman-owned photography studios in Amsterdam.

Pothuis died on 24 January 1945, in Amsterdam. Her work is in the Stedelijk Museum Amsterdam.

== Gallery ==
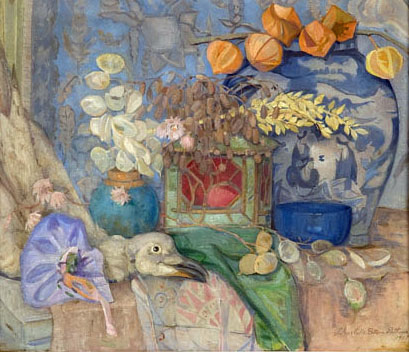
Stilleven met dode eend, 1917

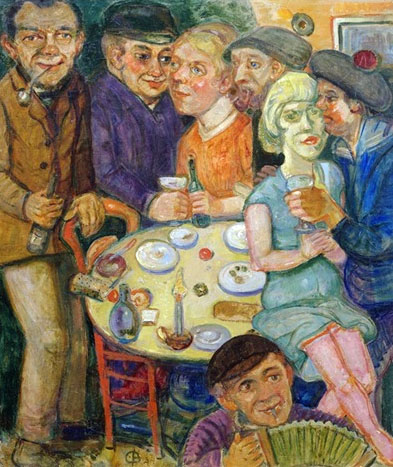
Im Café
