= Adri Bleuland van Oordt =

Dutch painter and illustrator

- Adriana Maria Hendrika Bleuland van Oordt
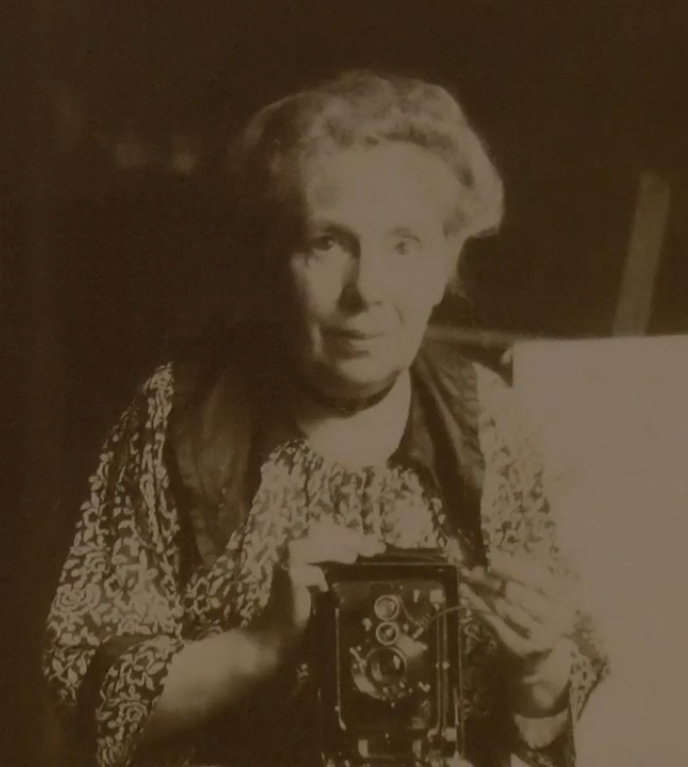
- Born: 5 June 1862; Rotterdam, Netherlands
- Died: 21 October 1944 (aged 82); Hilversum
- Education: Royal Academy of Fine Arts (Antwerp)
- Notable work: Portrait of Queen Wilhelmina

Adri Bleuland van Oordt was a Dutch artist and draftswoman who was active from around 1877 until her death in 1944.

== Biography ==
Adriana Maria Hendrika Bleuland van Oordt (known as Adri Bleuland van Oordt) was born in Rotterdam, Netherlands on 5 June 1862 to Guilhelmina Catharina Arnoudina Hoogwerff and Jan Bleuland van Oordt. She was educated at the Royal Academy of Fine Arts from 1884 to 1889.

Bleuland van Oordt painted portraits, still life images, figures, fruit, and scenes, including with pastels, oil paint, chalk and watercolors. She portrayed Queen Wilhelmina in 1899 as well as Joannes Pieter Roetert Tak van Poortvliet around the same time.

Bleuland van Oordt was a member of the Amsterdam Artists Association of Sint Lucas. As a member of this association, her work was regularly exhibited in the Stedelijk Museum. In addition to her work as a visual artist, Bleuland van Oordt was active in the women's rights movement and obtaining women's suffrage. During the First World War she received Belgian refugees. Her sister Johanna Bleuland van Oordt was also a published artist.

Bleuland van Oordt died in Hilversum on 21 October 1944.

== Well known works ==
- Portrait of Wilhelmina van Oranje- Nassau (1880–1962)
- Portrait of Joannes Pieter Roetert Tak van Poortvliet (1839–1904)
- Portrait of Christina Louisa Henrietta Geertruida van Oordt (1850–1897)
- Portrait of Daniël de Lange (1841–1918)
- Two Girls in Regional Costume (1910)
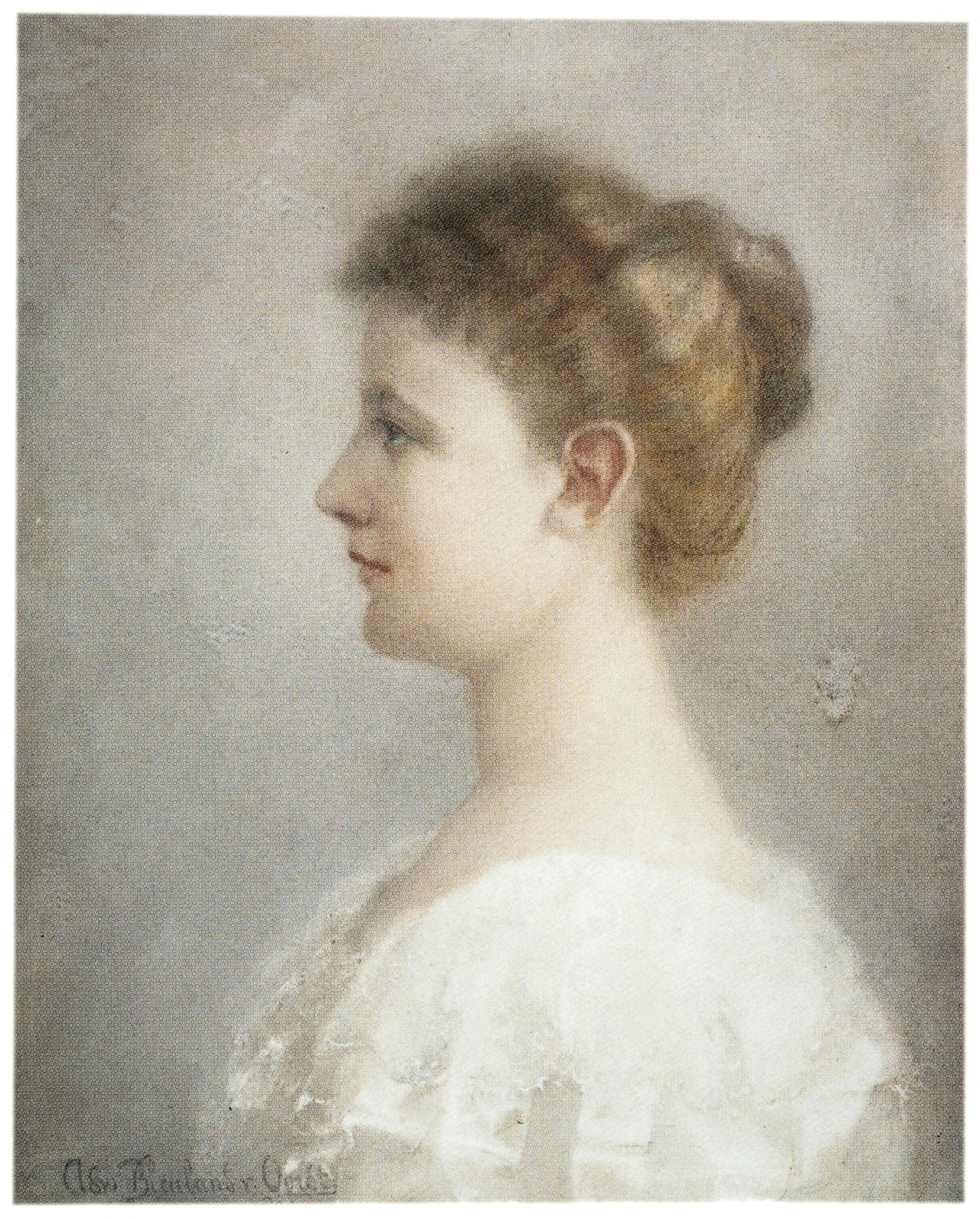
Portrait of Wilhelmina van Oranje- Nassau (1880–1962)

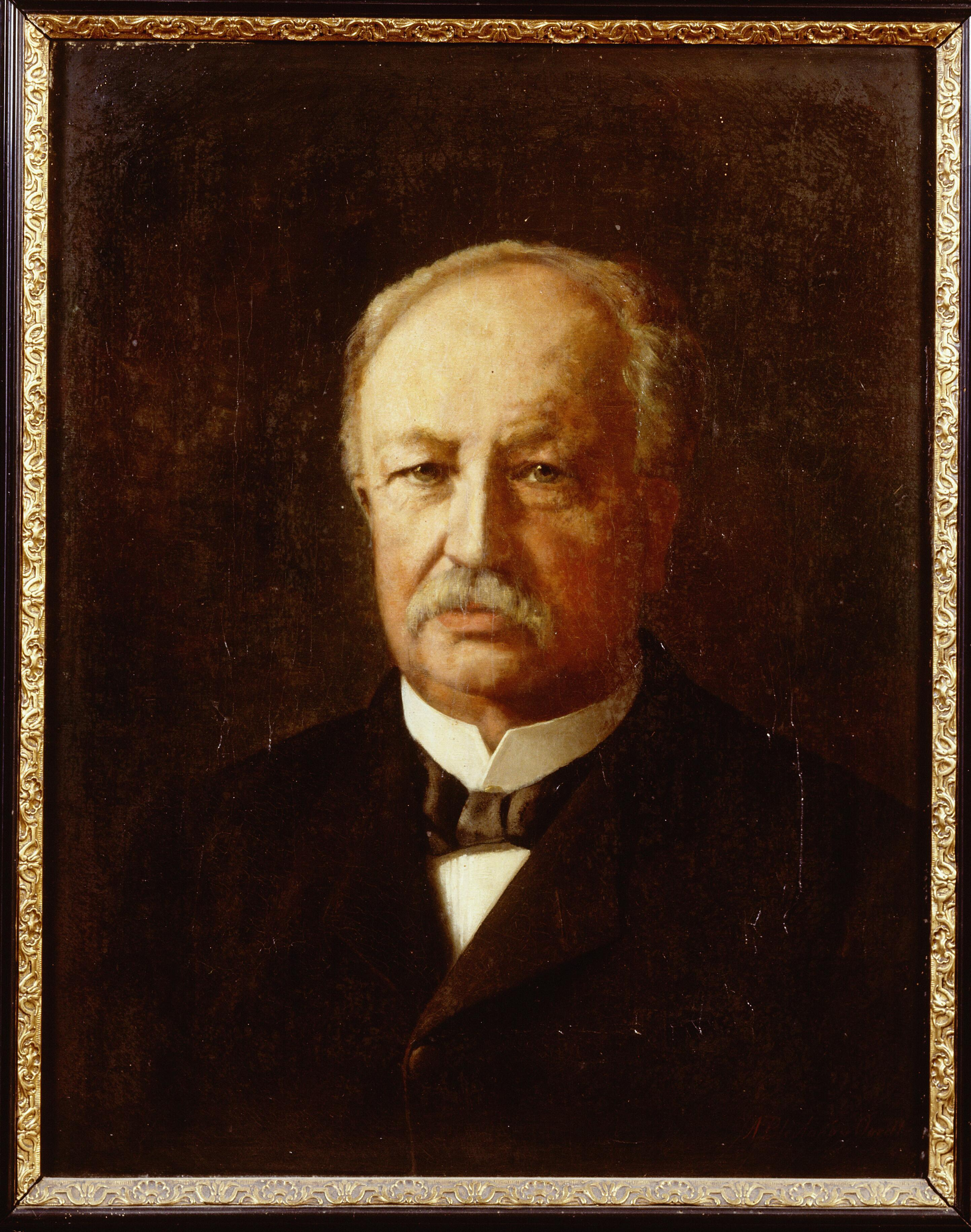
Portrait of Joannes Pieter Roetert Tak van Poortvliet (1839–1904)

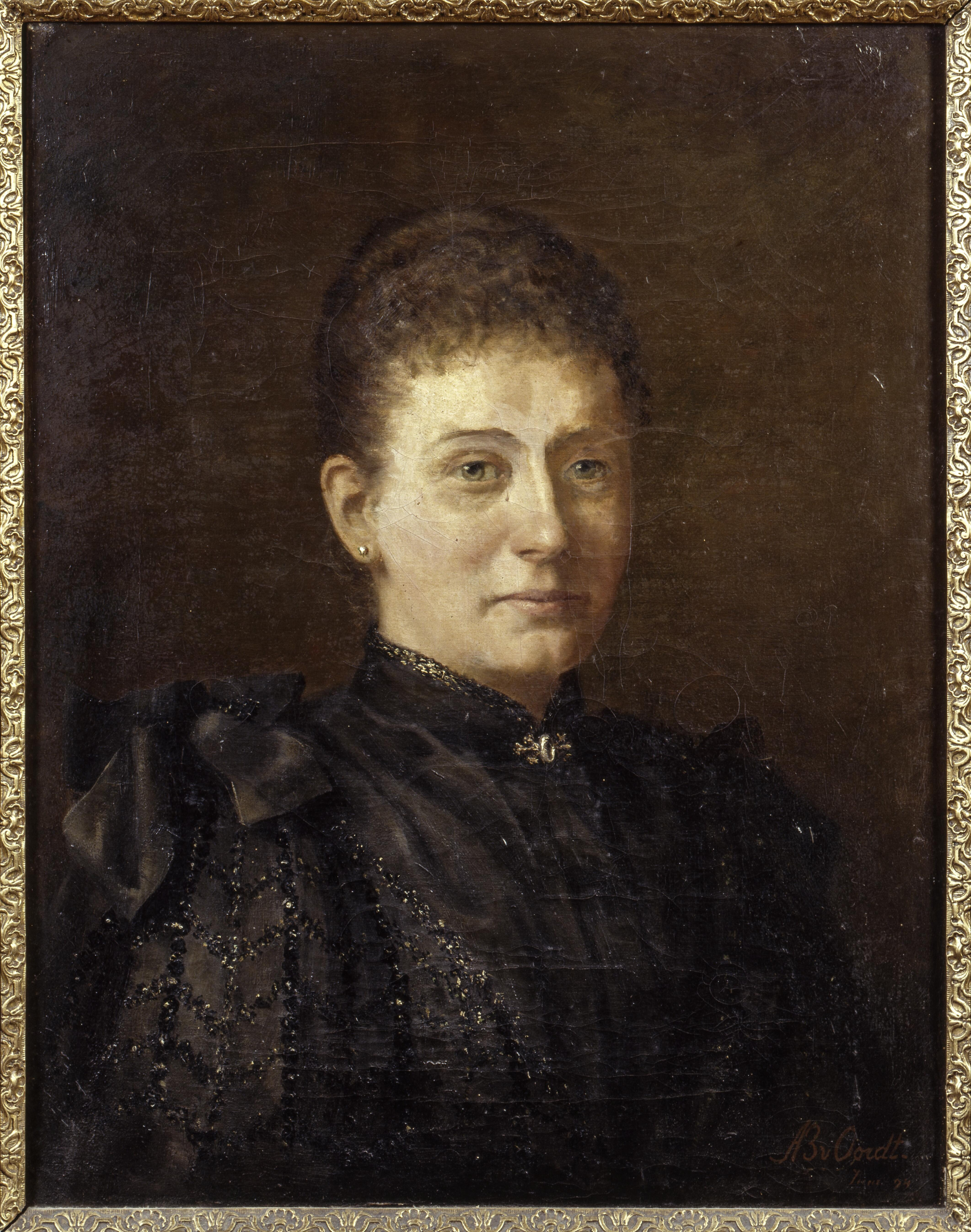
Portrait of Christina Louisa Henrietta Geertruida van Oordt (1850–1897)

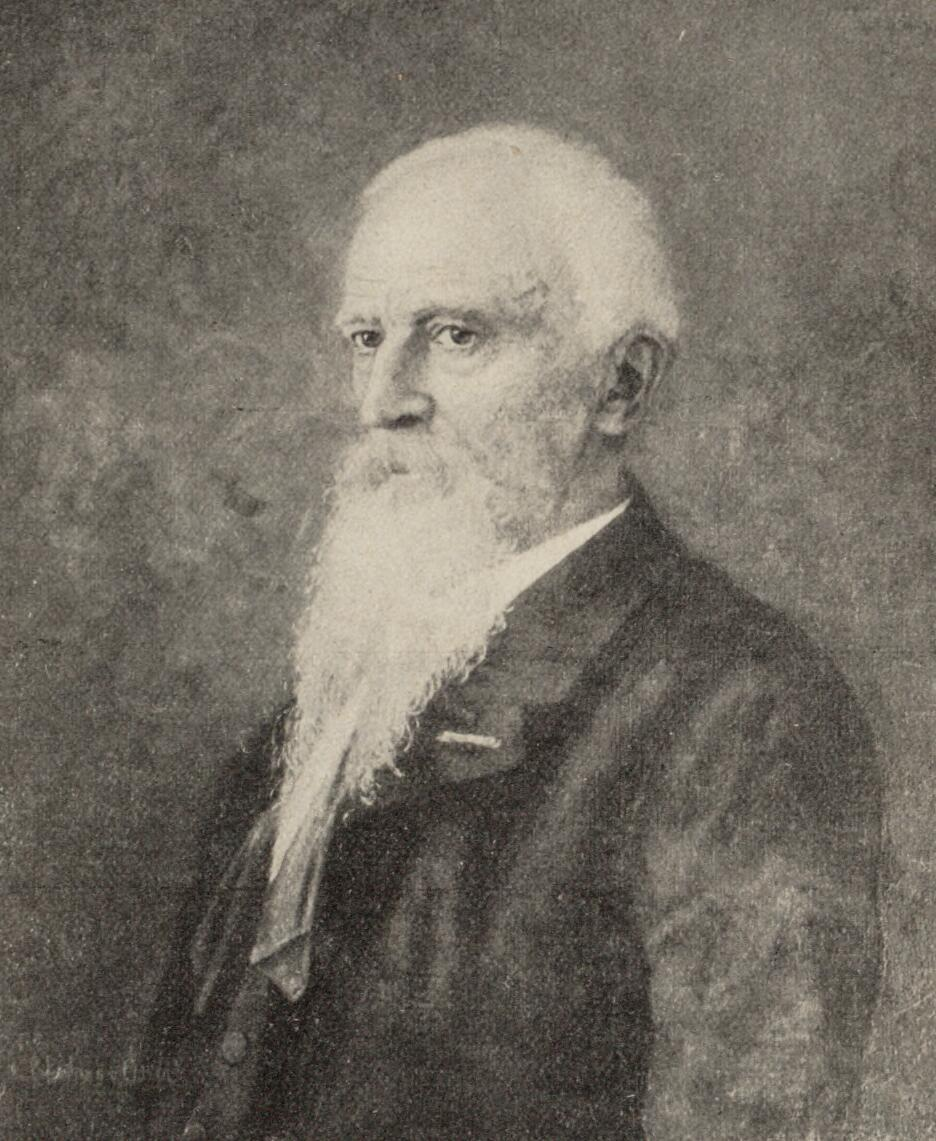
Portrait of Daniel de Lange (1841–1918)

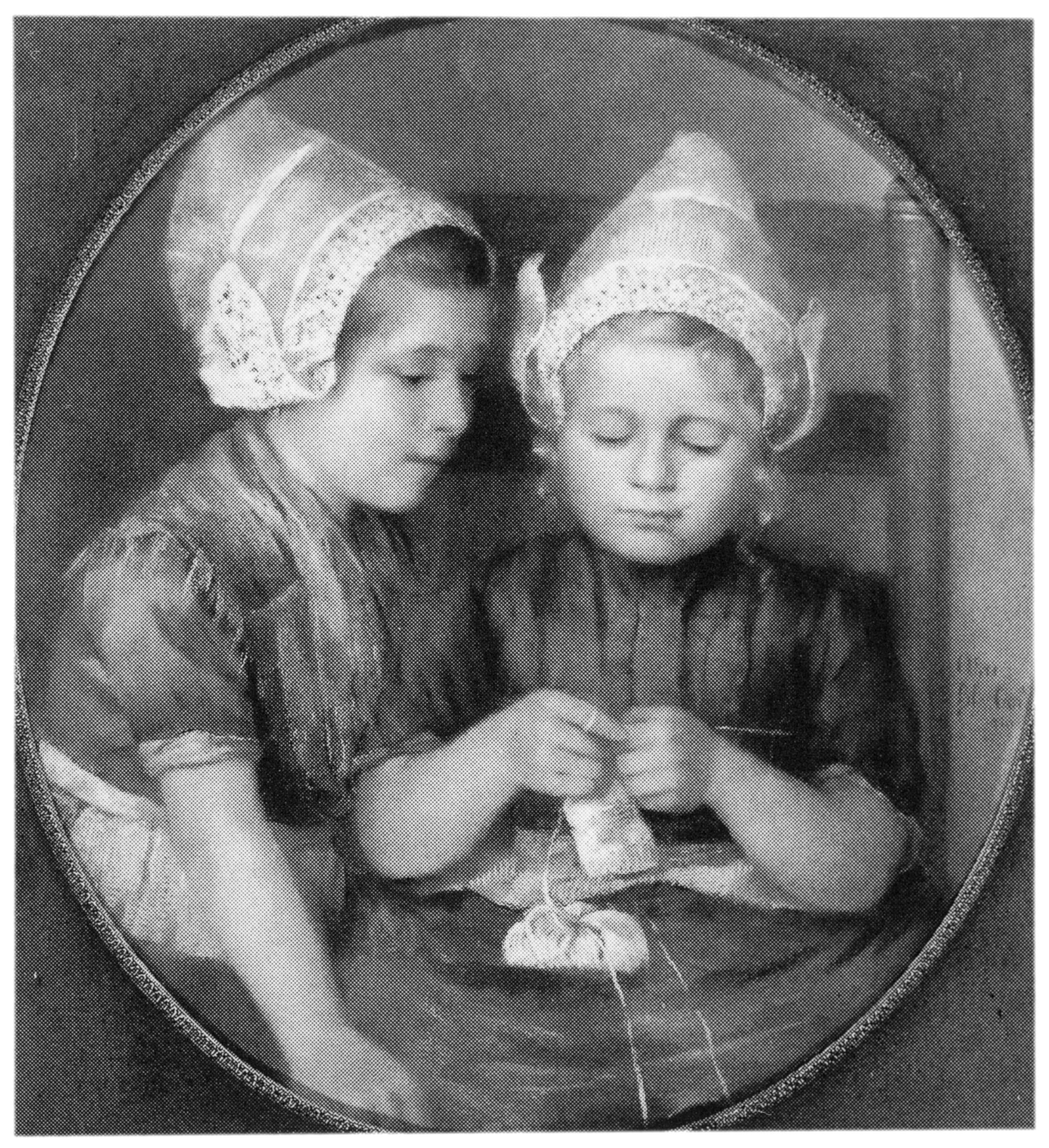
Two Girls in Regional Costume (1910)
