= Agnieta Gijswijt =

Dutch artist

- self portrait, 1898
- Born: 19 December 1873; Gorinchem, Netherlands
- Died: 8 February 1962 (aged 88); Amsterdam, Netherlands
- Education: Rijksakademie van beeldende kunsten
- Known for: Painting

Agnieta Cornelia Gijswijt (1873-1962) was a Dutch painter.

== Biography ==
Gijswijt was born on 19 December 1873 in Gorinchem. She studied at the Rijksakademie van beeldende kunsten (State Academy of Fine Arts). Her teachers included August Allebé, Carel Lodewijk Dake, Nicolaas van der Waay, and Anna Wijthoff. From 1904 through 1924 she taught at the Dagtekenschool voor meisjes (English:Day drawing school for girls). Her students included Jo van Oosten Slingeland and Catharina Elisabeth Wassink.

Gijswijt was a member of the Kunstenaarsvereniging Sint Lucas, and Arti et Amicitiae'. Her work was included in the 1939 exhibition and sale Onze Kunst van Heden (Our Art of Today) at the Rijksmuseum in Amsterdam.

Giesberts died on 8 February 1962 in Amsterdam.
