= Hendrika van Gelder =

Dutch artist

Hendrika Van Gelder
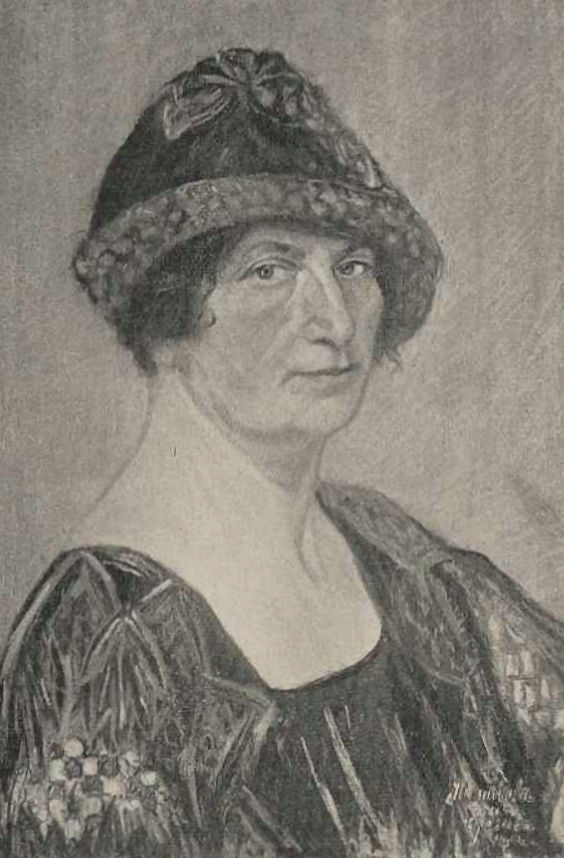
- Self portrait, c 1925
- Born: 7 May 1870; Amsterdam, Netherlands
- Died: 7 May 1943 (aged 73); Sobibor extermination camp, Poland
- Known for: Painting

Hendrika Van Gelder (1870–1943) was a Dutch painter known for portraits and still life paintings.

== Biography ==
van Gelder was born on 7 May 1870 in Amsterdam. She studied with Henriëtte Asscher, Eduard Frankfort, and Rien Hack. She was a member of the Kunstenaarsvereniging Sint Lucas, De Independents, and Arti et Amicitiae'. Around 1933 she moved into an artist studio in the Zomerdijkstraat.

Her work was included in the 1939 exhibition and sale Onze Kunst van Heden (Our Art of Today) at the Rijksmuseum in Amsterdam.

In 1943 van Gelder was deported to Sobibor, Poland where she died on 7 May 1943 in the Sobibor extermination camp.

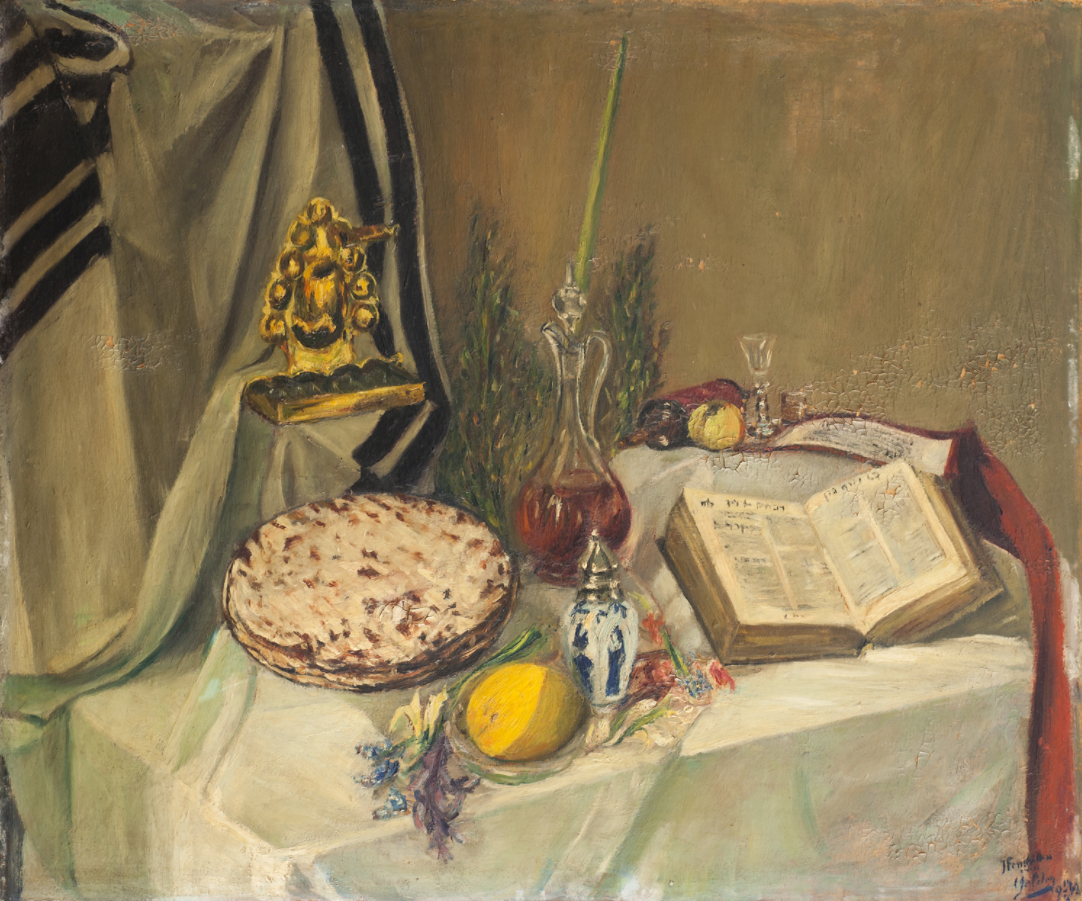
Hendrika van Gelder - Still life, table with prayer rug draped on top
