= Willemina Ogterop =

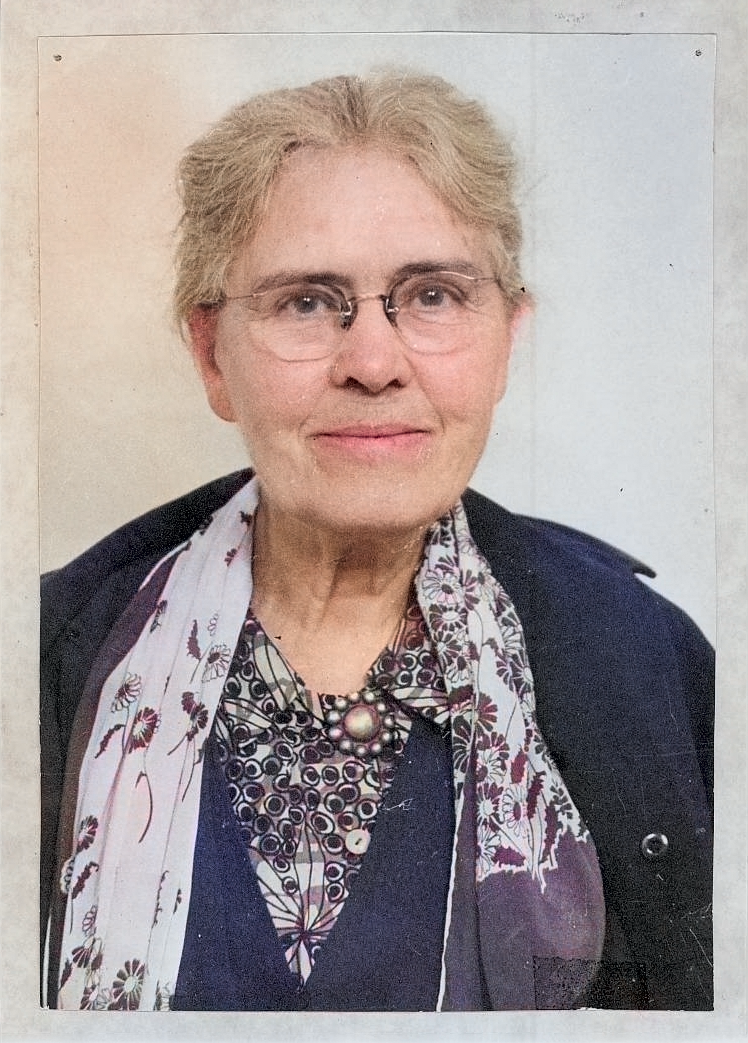
- Colorized passport photo of Ogterop at 77
- Born: September 14, 1881; Maastricht Netherlands
- Died: September 28, 1974 (aged 93); Berkeley, California
- Education: Rijksmuseum Art Academy, Amsterdam
- Known for: stained glass

Willemina Ogterop (1881–1974) was a Dutch-American artist and stained glass window designer of almost 500 windows in 80 locations. Her wide-ranging interests included Eastern philosophy, religion and poetry, prompting her to create and donate some of her works of art to India, as well as writing her personal philosophy and participating in international peace movements. For a complete listing of her windows, see below under "References" item #3 - Krimgold, Eveline Ogterop (1977). "The Stained Glass Art of Willemina Ogterop" 136 pages.

== Biography ==
Mrs. Ogterop (nee Muller) was born in Maastricht in the Netherlands in 1881. She studied at the Academy of Fine Arts in Amsterdam before going to South Africa in 1903 at the age of 21. In Africa she met her future husband, Cornelis Ogterop; they were married in 1905 in Java, Indonesia where they lived before returning in 1907 to The Netherlands where their four children were born. The family immigrated at the end of World war I to California in 1918 and lived for ten years on a farm near Santa Cruz. When the entire family moved to Berkeley, Mrs. Ogterop began working in the Cummings Art Glass Studio in San Francisco as their principal designer from 1928 until 1953, designing nearly 500 stained glass windows, and creating more than 200 works of art in other media. She has been described as the first woman west of the Mississippi admitted to the stained glass artists' union.

There are more than 80 venues, primarily Christian churches, in six states of the U.S. which contain her stained glass windows; however, the great majority of her windows are in 40 cities and towns throughout California, in addition to a total of 9 churches in the states of Nevada, Washington, Oklahoma, Iowa, and Louisiana. Large cities often have several churches of her work. She considered her finest windows to be those in Saint Albert Priory, a Dominican theological seminary, in the Rockridge neighborhood of Oakland, California. Willemina Ogterop had an intense interest in the religions of the world, not only to enhance her professional artistic career, but to deepen her appreciation of Eastern philosophy and poetry. As a result, she created and donated three works of art to India, two of which can be found on public display. The most prominent is her woodcarving of "Satyagraha" (non-violent civil disobedience) in the National Gandhi Museum in New Delhi. Her original 16-inch high "Satyagraha" woodcarving, donated in 1953, was made into a 6-foot high painted plaster of Paris replica by an artist on staff, Mr. Anil Sen Gupta, in 1974. It is the entrance piece to the entire museum, and is mounted on the wall at the top of the Gandhi Museum stairs. A second donation of a stained glass plaque (approximately 12 by 14 inches) depicts a poem in Sanskrit by the Pulitzer-prize recipient Bengali poet Rabindranath Tagore, and is displayed in the Tagore Museum at Visva Bharati University, Santiniketan, Bolpur, West Bengal, India. The third work of art to India, a stained glass plaque, was sent to Nehru in 1946 by way of Nehru's sister, Vajaya Lakshmi Pandit, who received it in New York City upon concluding a U.S. national speaking tour for Indian independence, which came about on January 1, 1948. This plaque, which depicts Mother India breaking the chains of British colonialism, has yet to be found. In addition to her prodigious artwork, Mrs. Ogterop wrote out her philosophy of life, and was an active Socialist and Buddhist. She was also a lively and fascinating Grandmother to her eight grandchildren, two of whom have her name, Willemina, as their middle names.
