= Marie Molijn =

Dutch artist

- Born: Maria Aletta Fennigje Molijn; 19 November 1837; Rotterdam, Netherlands
- Died: 21 February 1932 (aged 94); The Hague, Netherlands
- Known for: Painting

Maria Aletta Fennigje Molijn (19 November 1837 — 21 February 1932) was a Dutch artist known for still life artwork.

== Biography ==
Molijn was born on 19 November 1837 in Rotterdam, where she lived until she moved to The Hague in 1901. She died on 21 February 1932 in The Hague. Her sister, Ida Molijn, was also a painter.

== Gallery ==
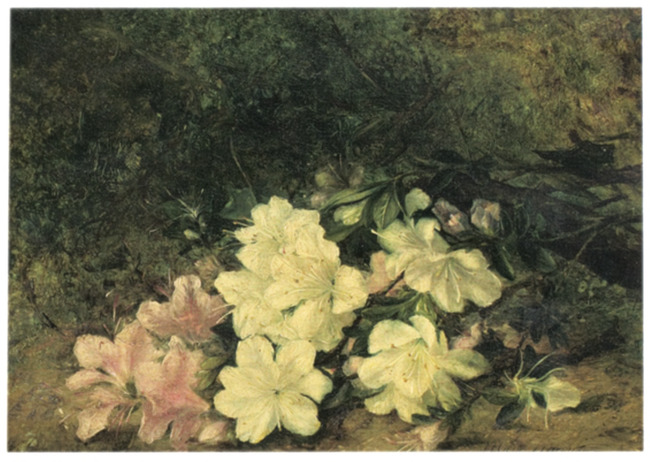
Still life with Blossom Branches

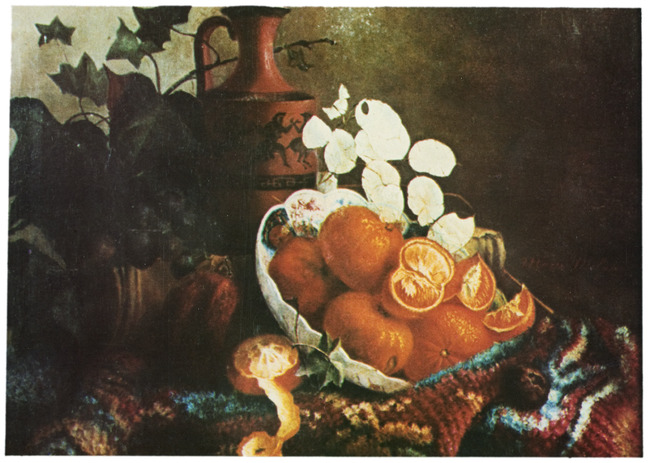
Still life with Citrus Fruits and Pitcher
