= Marie Cremers =

Dutch artist and author (1874–1960)

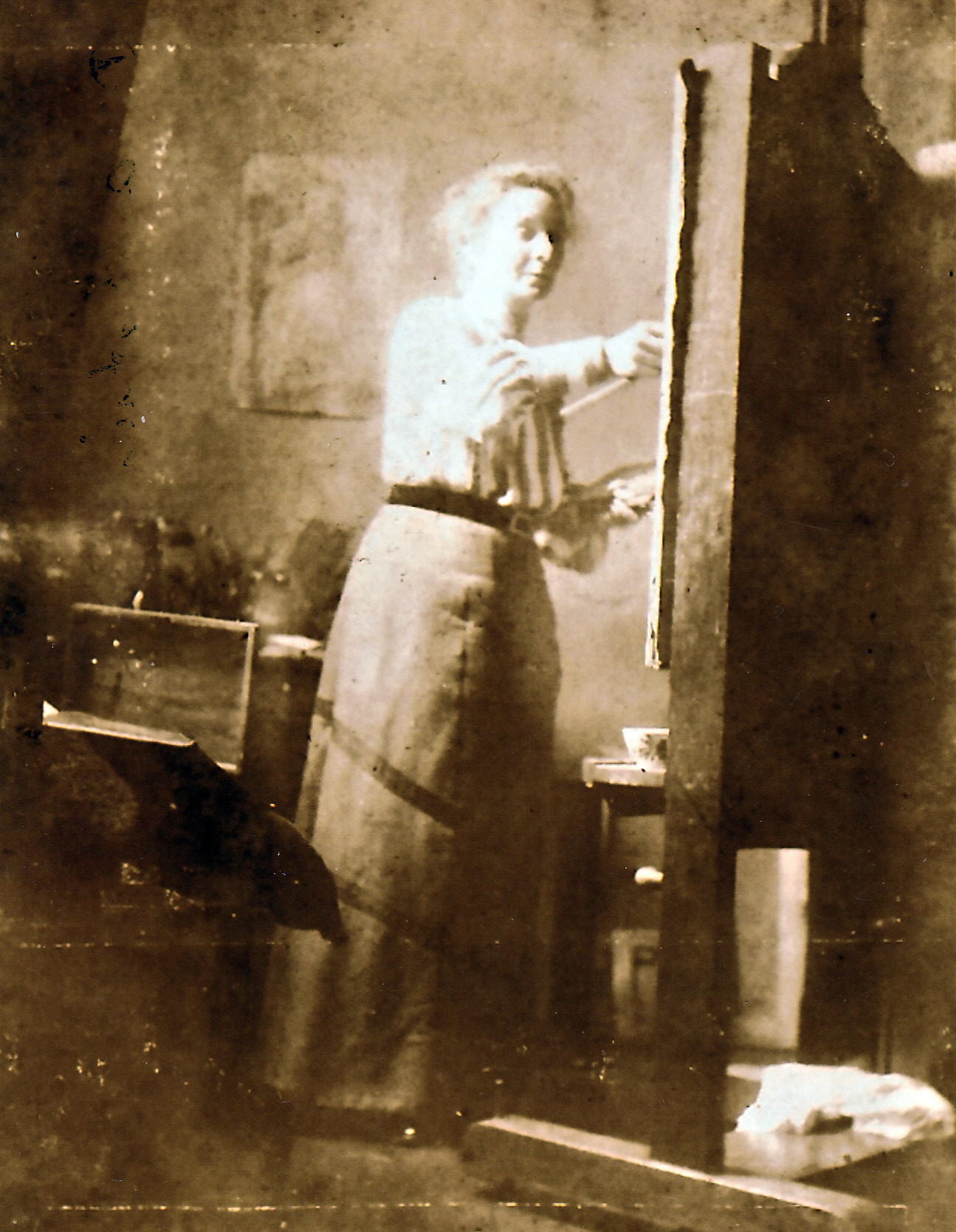
- Cremers in her studio in Bussum, c. 1910
- Born: Maria Elisabeth Cremers; 12 January 1874; Amsterdam, Netherlands
- Died: 9 March 1960 (aged 86); Bussum, Netherlands
- Known for: Painting

Marie Cremers (1874–1960) was a Dutch painter, lithographer, graphic artist, and illustrator.

== Biography ==
Cremers was born on 12 January 1874 in Amsterdam. She studied at the Rijksakademie van beeldende kunsten (State Academy of Fine Arts) and the Rijksschool voor Kunstnijverheid Amsterdam (National School for Applied Arts Amsterdam). Her instructors included August Allebé, Marie van Regteren Altena, Georgine Schwartze, and Jan Veth She was a member of the Arti et Amicitiae. Cremers was active as an author and illustrator. Her work was included in the 1939 exhibition and sale Onze Kunst van Heden (Our Art of Today) at the Rijksmuseum in Amsterdam.

Cremers died on 9 March 1960 in Bussum.
