= Adrienne van Hogendorp-s' Jacob =

Dutch still-life painter (1857–1920)

- Born: Adrienne Jacqueline s' Jacob; 28 January 1857; Batavia, Dutch East Indies
- Died: 19 September 1920 (aged 63)
- Known for: Still life painting
- Elected: Arti et Amicitiae; Pulchri Studio

Adrienne Jacqueline-'s Jacob or Adrienne van Hogendorp (28 January 1857 – 19 September 1920) was a Dutch still life painter.

Jacob was born in Batavia, Dutch East Indies (modern-day Jakarta) to Dutch parents. She trained as a painter with Martinus Wilhelmus Liernur, Simon van den Berg and Margaretha Roosenboom. She was a member of Arti et Amicitiae in Amsterdam and Pulchri Studio in The Hague.

Jacob exhibited her work at the Palace of Fine Arts at the 1893 World's Columbian Exposition in Chicago, Illinois.

Her painting Flower Still Life, was included in the 1905 book Women Painters of the World.

Hogendorp-s' Jacob died in Scheveningen.

== Gallery ==
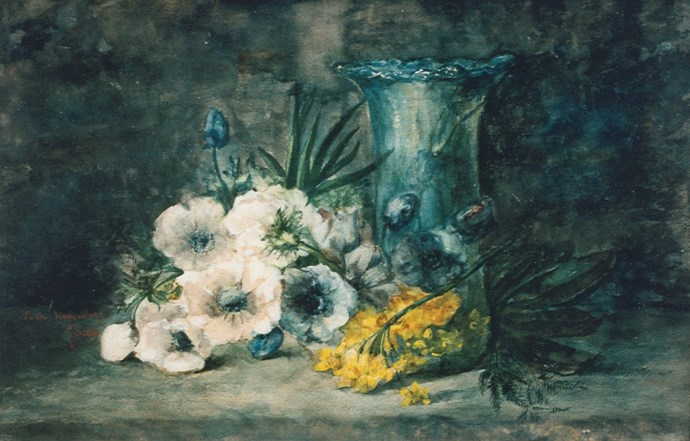
Floral Still Life

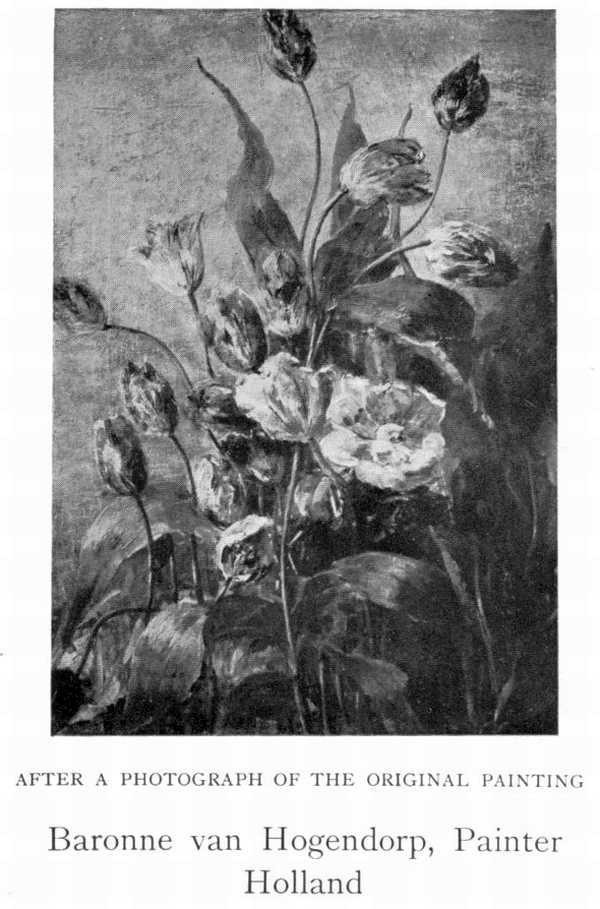
Floral Still Life

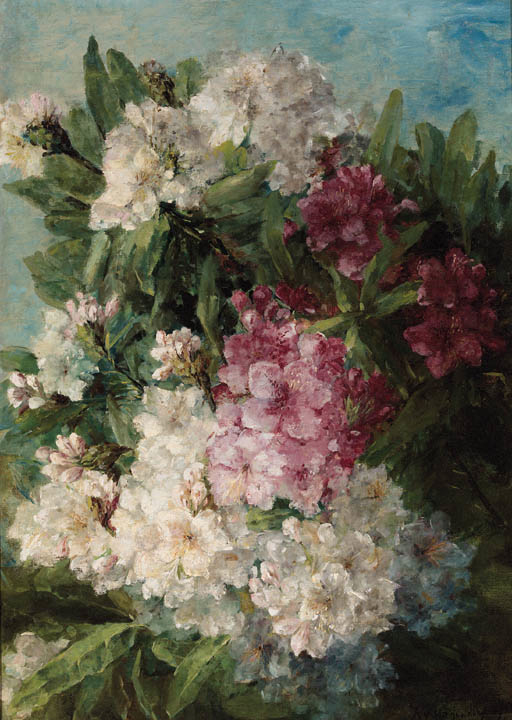
Rhododendrons

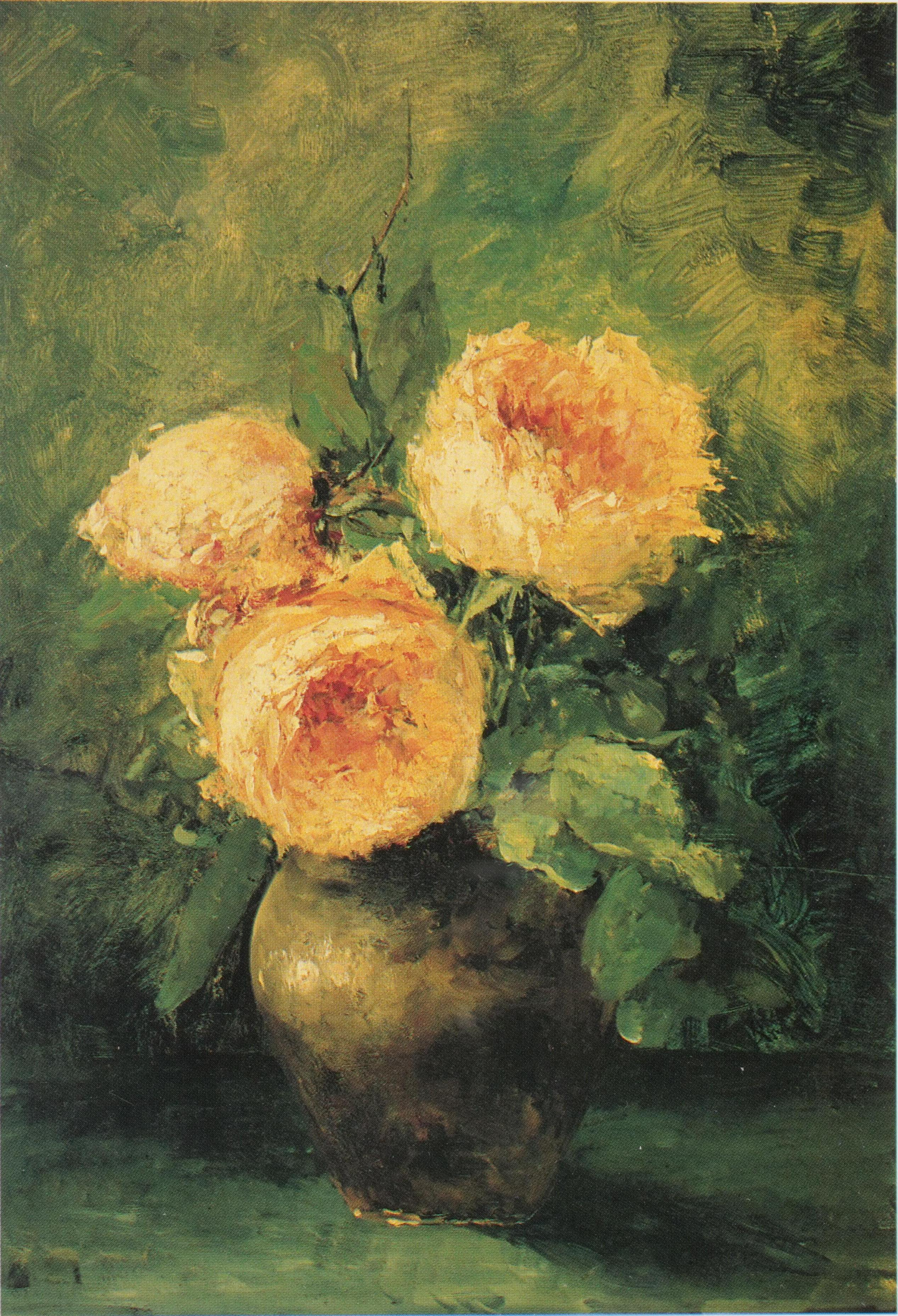
Yellow Roses
