= Wilhelmina van Idsinga =

Dutch painter (1788–1819)

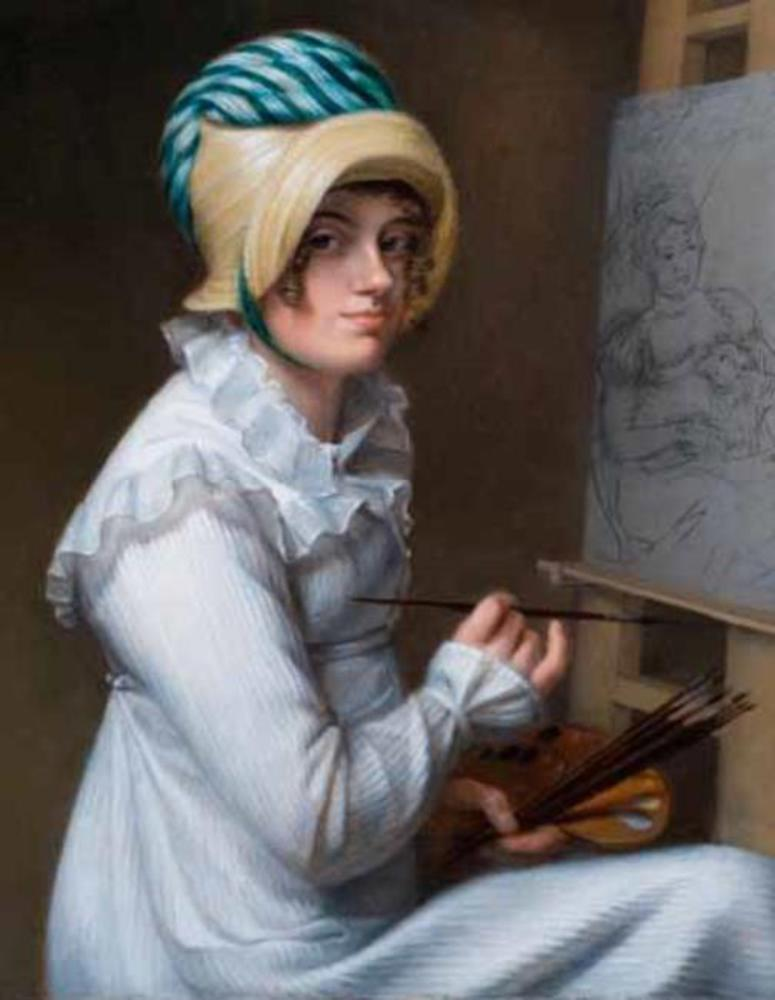
Self portrait, 1817

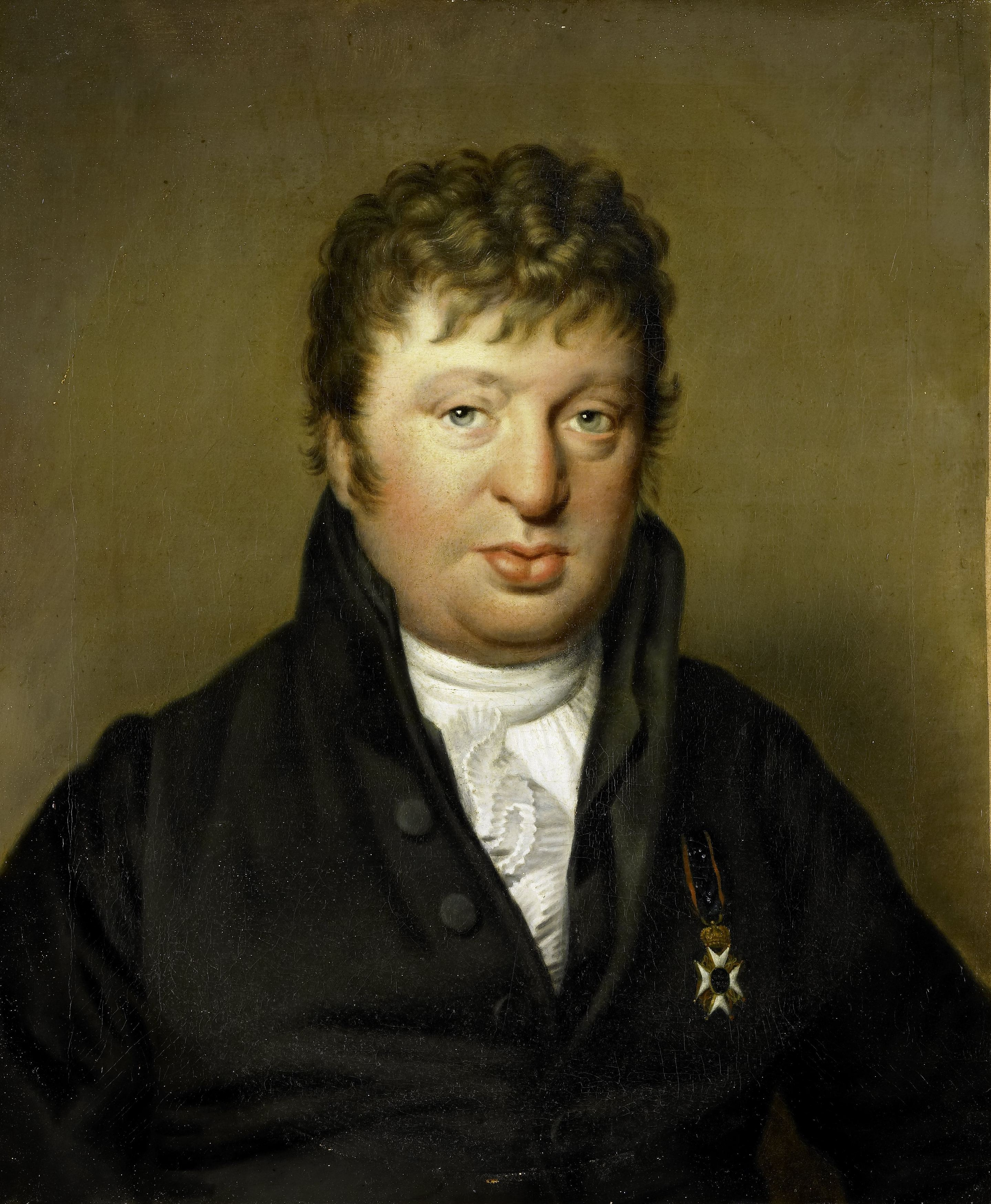
Jacobus Scheltema (1767-1835). Geschiedschrijver Rijksmuseum (Jacobus Scheltema, historiker)

Wilhelmina van Idsinga also Wilhelmina Geertruida of Idsinga, (1788–1819) was a Dutch painter. She was born in Leeuwarden.

== Early life ==
Wilhelmina van Idsinga was the only child of jonkheer Johan van Idsinga, registrar of the states of Friesland, and Tjebbina Heimans. When she was six years old, her mother died, after which Johan van Idsinga married Geertruida Style. Her father's second marriage was childless.

While she was young, she started drawing and painting portraits, initially in pastel chalk and later in oil paintings. She was taught by the Frisian painters Carel Jacob van Baar van Slangenburgh and Willem Bartel van der Kooi.

== Career ==
Around 1814 her artistic talent came to fruition. In that year she exhibited in The Hague and Amsterdam. Among other things, in Amsterdam was the portrait of a girl with a basket of flowers. Two years later, in 1816, she exhibited a pastel drawing to the painting "a historical ordinance, being the widow of Sarepta and the prophet Elias" by Govert Flinck . In 1818 Van Idsinga exhibited a portrait of a Frisian woman and a pastel drawing of an elderly man in an exhibition of living artists. The General Arts and Letterman called the works " showing off her practiced painting talent ."

== Death ==
Wilhelmina van Idsinga died on May 3, 1819, of a "a breast disease," Her parents left Wilhelmina's self-portrait with straw hat, which Wumkes in the New Dutch Biographical Dictionary called her best piece, to the Old Burger Weeshuis (Sneek), where the painting still resides.

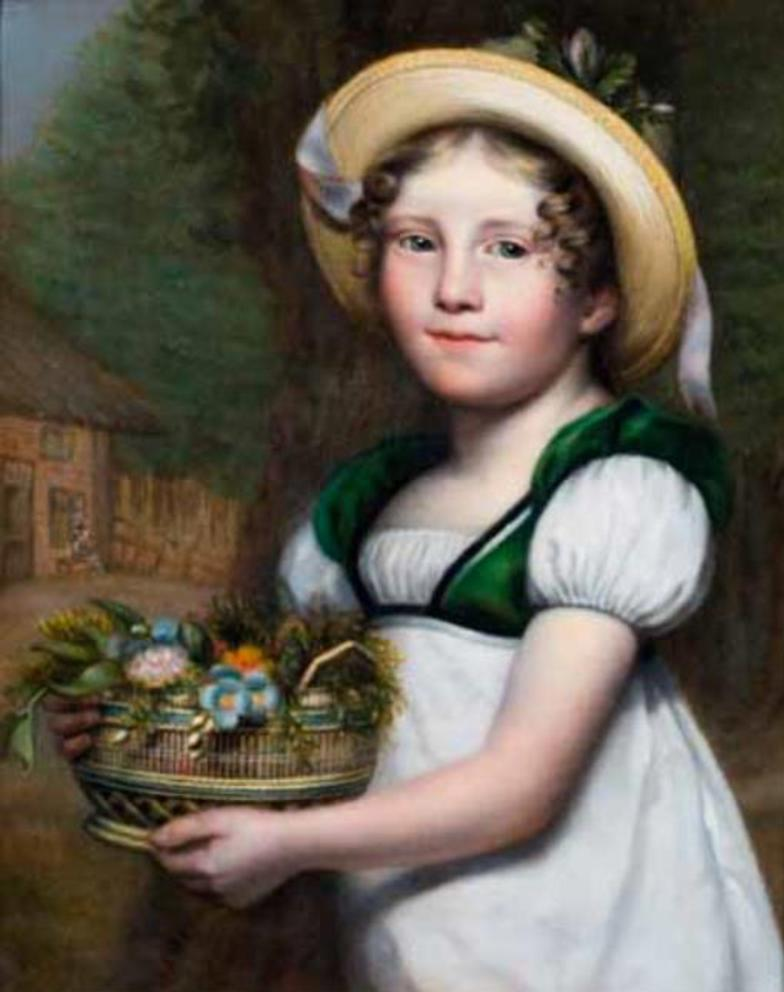
Portret van een meisje met hoed (Portrait of a girl with a hat).
