= Catharina Elisabeth Wassink =

Dutch artist

- Born: 2 March 1891; Amsterdam, Netherlands
- Died: 15 September 1983 (aged 92); Amstelveen, Netherlands
- Known for: Painting

Catharina Elisabeth Wassink (1891-1983) was a Dutch artist.

== Biography ==
Catharina (Teau) Wassink was born on 2 March 1891 in Amsterdam as daughter of general practitioner Dr. Louis N.S. Wassink and Nelly E. Coomans de Ruiter. She attended the Instituut Piersma. Her teachers included Agnieta Gijswijt, Wilhelmina Cornelia Kerlen, Hendrik Maarten Krabbé, and Johan Piersma. Her work was included in the 1939 exhibition and sale Onze Kunst van Heden (Our Art of Today) at the Rijksmuseum in Amsterdam. She was a member of Arti et Amicitiae.

Wassink died on 15 September 1983 in Amstelveen.
