= Aletta Ruijsch =

Dutch artist (1860–1930)

- Born: 6 August 1860; Den Helder, Netherlands
- Died: 20 November 1930 (aged 70); The Hague, Netherlands
- Known for: Painting
- Spouse: Hendrik Otto van Thol

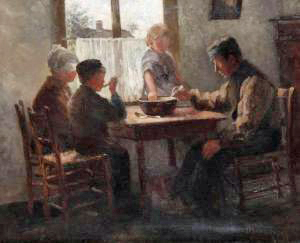
Interieur met boerenfamilie

Aletta Ruijsch or Aletta van Thol-Ruijsch (1860–1930) was a Dutch painter.

== Biography ==
Ruijsch was born on 6 August 1860 in Den Helder, Netherlands. She studied at the Koninklijke Academie van Beeldende Kunsten (Royal Academy of Art, The Hague) and the Academie voor Beeldende Kunsten, (Academy of Visual Arts, Rotterdam). Her teachers included Eugène Joors. Her students included Nelly Goedewaagen.

In 1899 she married fellow artist Hendrik Otto van Thol.

She was a member of the Pulchri Studio in The Hague, the Utrecht artist society Kunstliefde, the Vereeniging Sint Lucas Amsterdam (Amsterdam Artists Association of Sint Lucas) and the Arti et Amicitiae artist's society. She exhibited her work at the 1900 Paris Exposition.

Ruijsch died on 20 November 1930, in The Hague.
