= Hetty Broedelet-Henkes =

Dutch artist

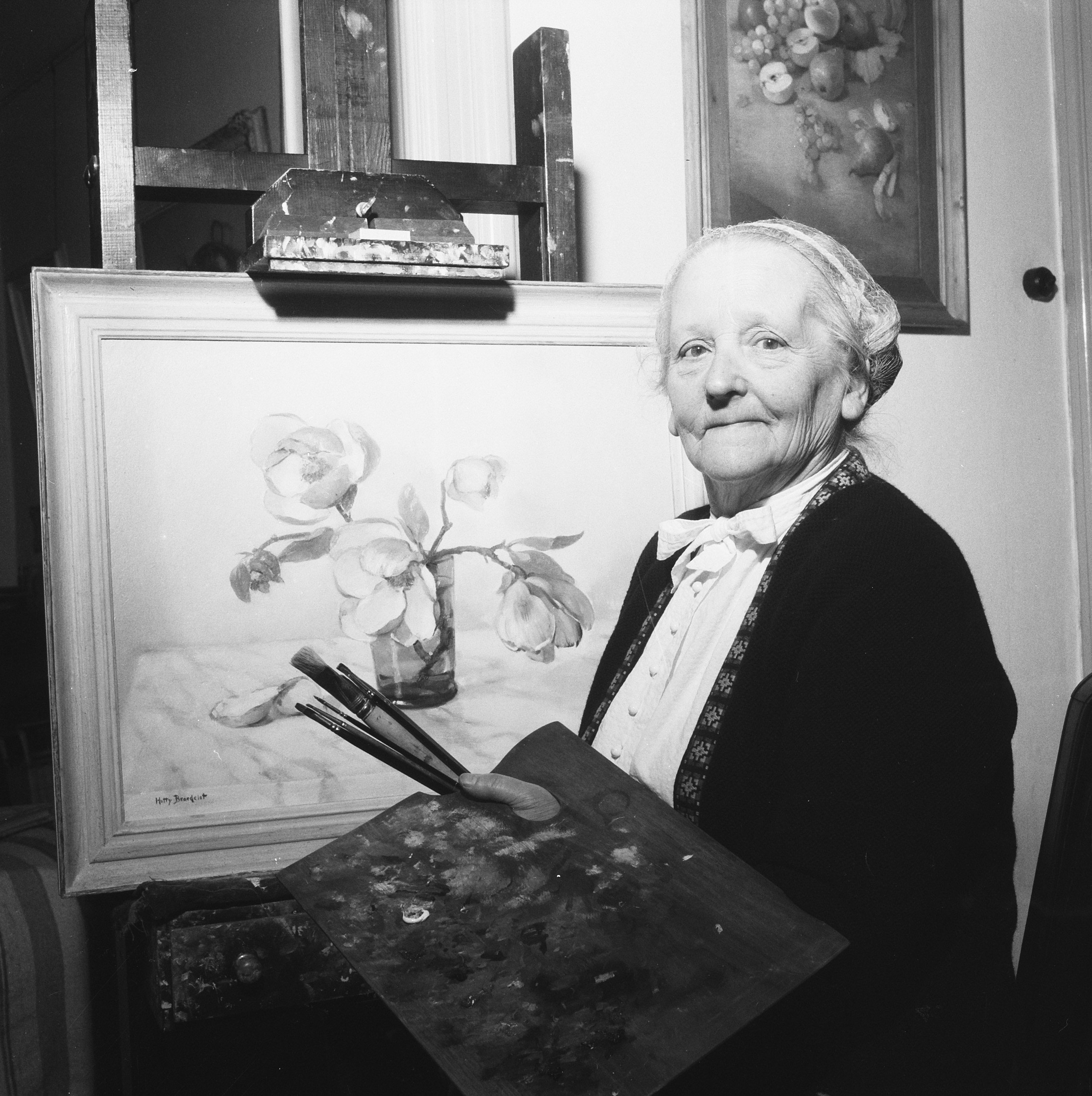
- Broedelet-Henkes shortly before her 80th birthday
- Born: Hester Henkes; 18 January 1877; Delfshaven, The Netherlands
- Died: 2 January 1966 (aged 88); Deventer, The Netherlands
- Known for: Painting
- Spouse: André Broedelet

Hetty Broedelet-Henkes (1878–1949) was a Dutch painter known for her still lifes.

== Biography ==
Broedelet-Henkes née Henkes was born on 18 January 1877 in Delfshaven. She studied at Akademie van beeldende kunsten (Den Haag) (Royal Academy of Art, The Hague). She was a member of the Pulchri Studio and Schilderessenvereniging Odis (The Hague). She was married to fellow artist André Broedelet (1872-1936). Broedelet-Henkes' work was included in the 1939 exhibition and sale Onze Kunst van Heden (Our Art of Today) at the Rijksmuseum in Amsterdam. Broedelet-Henkes died on 2 January 1966 in Deventer.
