= Johanna Bleuland van Oordt =

Dutch artist (1865–1948)

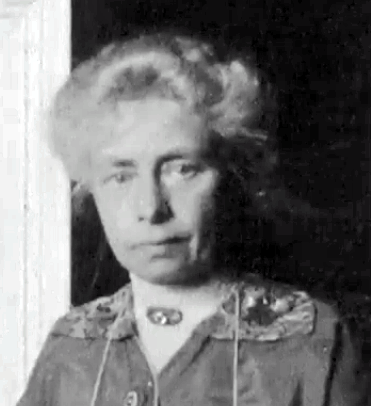
- Born: 28 August 1865; Katendrecht, Netherlands
- Died: 15 December 1948 (aged 83); Leidschendam, Netherlands
- Known for: Painting

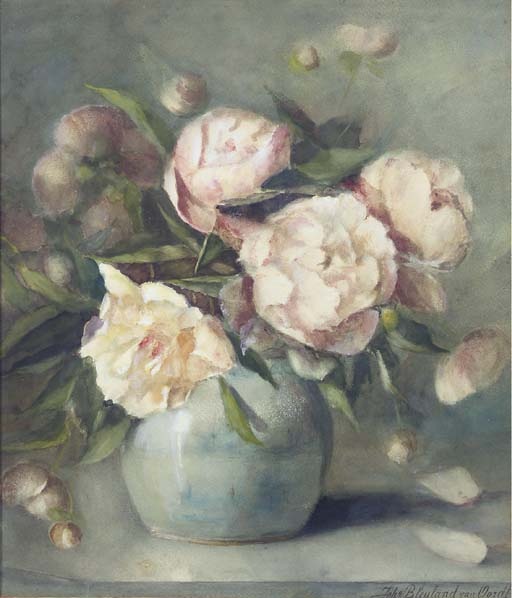
Peonies in a vase

Johanna Jacoba Bleuland van Oordt (1865 – 1948) was a Dutch painter.

== Biography ==
Oordt was born on 28 August 1865 in Katendrecht, Netherlands. She studied at the Koninklijke Academie van Beeldende Kunsten (Royal Academy of Art, The Hague). Her teachers included Frits Jansen. Her sister Adri Bleuland van Oordt was also an artist. Johanna and Adri exhibited regularly at the Haagse Kunstkring.

Oordt died on 15 December 1948, in Leidschendam.

In 2018 the Museum Swaensteyn held an exhibition entitled Adriana and Johanna Bleuland van Oordt - Artistic sisters in a Voorburg country estate.
