= Henriëtte Asscher =

Dutch painter

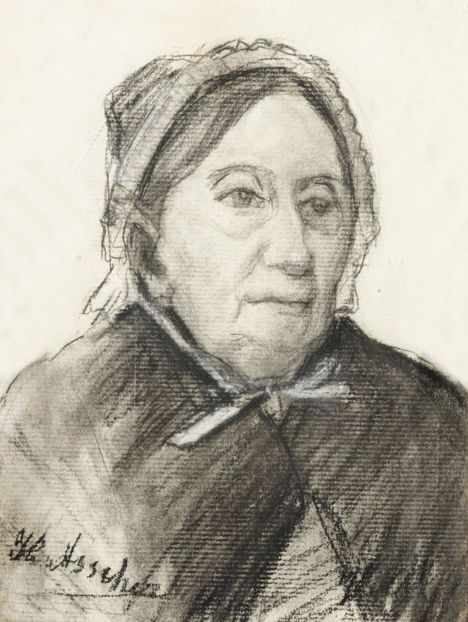
- Portrait of Asscher in circa 1925
- Born: 18 July 1858; Amsterdam, Netherlands
- Died: 9 April 1933 (aged 74); Amsterdam, Netherlands
- Known for: Painting

Henriëtte Asscher (July 18, 1858 – April 9, 1933) was a Dutch painter.

== Biography ==
Asscher was born on 18 July 1858 in Amsterdam. She studied at the Rijksakademie van beeldende kunsten (State Academy of Fine Arts) and the Rijksnormaalschool voor Teekenonderwijzers (National Normal School for Drawing Teachers). Her teachers included Eduard Frankfort.

She was a member of the Vereeniging Sint Lucas Amsterdam (Amsterdam Artists Association of Sint Lucas) and the Arti et Amicitiae artist's society. Her students included Charlotte Pothuis and Hendrika Van Gelder.

Asscher died on 9 April 1933, in Amsterdam.

== Gallery ==
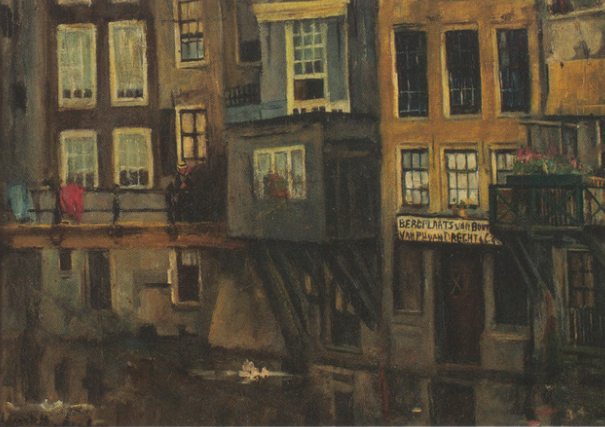
Een brokje Amsterdam

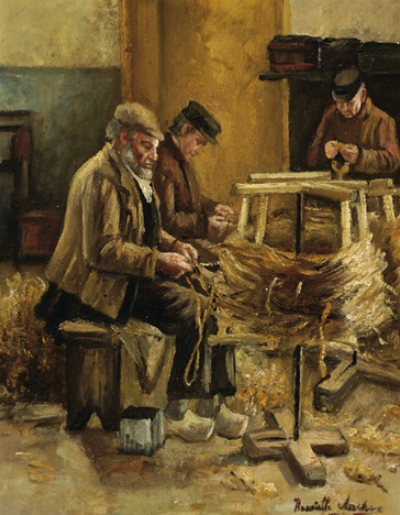
Broom makers
