= Ro Mogendorff =

Dutch artist

- self portrait
- Born: Rosa Catherina Mogendorff; 21 June 1907; Amsterdam, Netherlands
- Died: 27 October 1969 (aged 62); Laren, Netherlands
- Known for: Painting
- Website: romogendorff.nl

Rosa "Ro" Catherina Mogendorff (1907–1969) was a Dutch artist.

== Biography ==
Mogendorff was born on 21 June 1907 in Amsterdam. She had a twin sister Isidora Mogendorff Frederika (1907–1985). A third sister, Elize Marianna (Liesje), was born in 1919.

Mogendorff studied at the Rijksakademie van beeldende kunsten (State Academy of Fine Arts). Her teachers included Johannes Hendricus Jurres and Martin Monnickendam. In 1929 she was the recipient of the Cohen Godschalk Prize. Around that time she opened a studio in Amsterdam with fellow artist Paul Citroen and worked with Charlotte van Pallandt. Mogendorff's work was included in the 1939 exhibition and sale Onze Kunst van Heden (Our Art of Today) at the Rijksmuseum in Amsterdam.

From 1942 through 1947 Mogendorff was in hiding from the World War II occupying forces. Her family was split apart. After her father's death in Harleem, Mogendorff went there to take care of her mother. She returned to Amsterdam with her mother. In 1943 her sister, Elize, a member of the Dutch resistance, died from a gunshot wound in the course of a murder-suicide by fellow resistance member Ernst Carl Frederik ten Haaf.

After the war Mogendorff continued to draw and paint, exhibiting frequently with Nederlandse Kring van Tekenaars (Dutch Circle of Drafters). In 1957 she received the Prix de la Critique from the Association Internationale des Critiques d'Art and in 1967 she was made a knight of the Order of Orange-Nassau.

Mogendorff was a member of the Arti et Amicitiae, De Brug (The Bridge), Federatie van Verenigingen van Beroeps Beeldende Kunstenaars (Federation of Associations of Professional Visual Artists), and the Nederlandse Kring van Tekenaars .

Mogendorff died on 27 October 1969 in the Rosa Spier Huis in Laren, North Holland.
