= Philipine Vinke =

Dutch artist

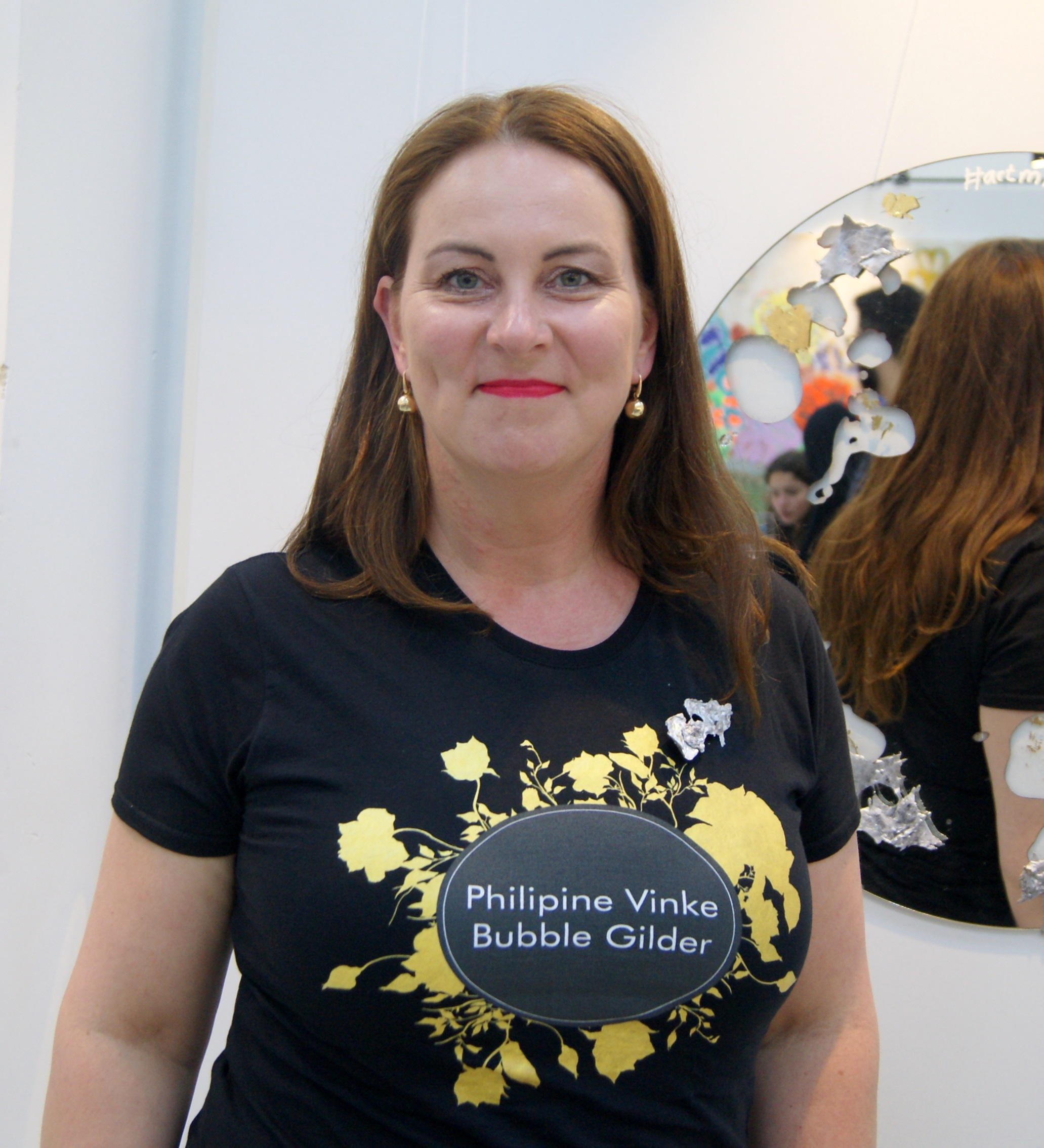
- Born: Philipine Vinke; 3 November 1968 (age 57); Ermelo, Netherlands
- Known for: Bubble Gilding

Philipine Vinke (Dutch: Philipine Vinke, born on 3 November 1968 in Ermelo, Netherlands) is a Dutch artist. Founding member of "The Nunspeet School".

== Life and work ==
Philipine Vinke was born in 1968 in Ermelo, works and lives in Nunspeet. Vinke uses her innovative technique Bubble Gilding of which first works were created in 2015. Vinke integrates modern materials, such as epoxy, with old techniques as watergilding and "verre églomisé".

Exclusively for Armenia Art Fair 2018 Vinke has produced a "Welcome Pennant" in the colours of the Armenian flag. Welcome Pennants are flown on Dutch flagpoles. They are a welcoming symbol. Dutch Parliament recognized the Armenian genocide in 2018, and Vinke's pennant is both part of this commemoration as well as a celebration of the first Armenian Art Fair. The pennant is part of a series “Welcome Pennants” which Vinke produced in colours of flags. The technique Vinke uses has been developed by herself. The pennant is cast freehand out of epoxy.

=== Exhibitions ===
Armenia Art Fair is the first time Vinke has been exhibited in Armenia. Earlier in 2018 Vinke exhibited in Dubai, as well as in the Netherlands. On display in the booth of Gallery Duarte will be pieces from her first series of Bubble Gilding, as well as her current series „Art Mirrors“, and „Obsolete Ego’s”. These are made from recycled mirrors. Since a part of their reflective surfaces has been removed, these mirrors represent both the reflective side of humanity as well as its transparency.

2018

- Armenia Art Fair, 11–14 May, Yerevan
- World Art Dubai, 18–21 April
- Veluvine, Nunspeet, 6 January - 14 March, curated by Menna Kruiswijk

2017

- Vrije Academie Nunspeet, group exhibition "The Nunspeetse School", 1 July - 23 August
- Stedelijk Museum Schiedam, Salon des Réfusés, "Welcome Pennant Blue", 18 March - 3 April
- Marked Square, Nunspeet, Installation "Flaxit", January–March

2016

- De Bank, Harderwijk, Bubble Gilding 2, 16 November - 13 February 2017, curated by Menna Kruiswijk
- “Galerie Arneri", Harderwijk, Bubble Gilding 1, 12 June - 8 August, curated by Menna Kruiswijk
- Dutch Hair, Nunspeet, “Dutch Flag”, January–March

== Collections ==
Philipine Vinke's artworks can be found in private collections worldwide.
