= Nelly Goedewaagen =

Dutch artist

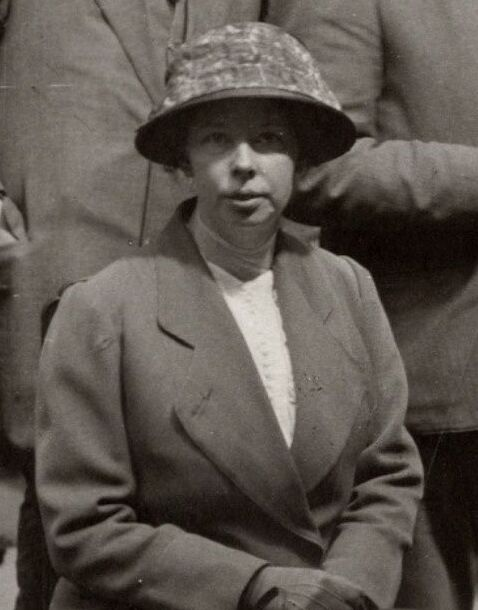
- Born: Pieternella Cornelia Goedewaagen; 16 August 1880; Gouda, Netherlands
- Died: 16 February 1953 (aged 72); Amsterdam, Netherlands
- Known for: Painting

Pieternella "Nelly" Cornelia Goedewaagen (1880 – 1953) was a Dutch painter and printmaker.

== Biography ==
Goedewaagen was born on 16 August 1880 in Gouda. She studied at the Akademie van beeldende kunsten (Royal Academy of Art, The Hague). Her teachers included Aletta Ruijsch, and Bernard Schregel.

Goedewaagen was a member of the Arti et Amicitiae, Kunstenaarsvereniging Sint Lucas, Kunstenaarsvereniging De Onafhankelijken (Artists' association De Independents), Teekengenootschap Pictura (Dordrecht) (Drawing society Pictura), and Schilderessenvereniging ODIS She exhibited at De Vrouw 1813-1913 (The Woman 1813–1913). Goedewaagen's work was included in the 1939 exhibition and sale Onze Kunst van Heden (Our Art of Today) at the Rijksmuseum in Amsterdam.

Goedewaagen died on 16 February 1953 in Amsterdam.
