= Anuska Oosterhuis =

Dutch media artist

Anuska Oosterhuis (Enschede, 1978) is a Dutch media artist who lives and works in Rotterdam. She is founder of the Artememes foundation (2007), an art organization that aims to reflect on the position of man in a society dominated by mass media images.

== Works of Art ==
- 2014. PLAY2, flash video game with Internet home videos
- 2013. Memetic Manifesto, art manifesto on mass media
- 2008. My Favorite Funeral, staged reality show
- 2005. PLAY1, flash video game with Internet home videos

== Interviews ==
Daily Undertaker, My Favorite Funeral, June 18, 2011
