= Jeanne Bieruma Oosting =

Dutch artist (1898–1994)

- Born: 5 February 1898; Leeuwarden
- Died: 14 July 1994 (aged 96)

Adriana Johanna Wilhelmina (Jeanne) Bieruma Oosting (1898–1994) was a Dutch sculptor, engraver, graphic artist, lithographer, illustrator, glass artist, painter, illustrator and book designer.

She studied at the School of Arts and Applied Arts in Haarlem, the Academy of Art in The Hague and the Academie de la Grande Chaumiere in Paris. As a graphic artist, she is best known for her book covers, stained-glass designs, bookplates, and stamps, along with artworks exploring natural and urban landscapes, interiors, human figures, and floral and still-life compositions. She was invested as a Knight of the Order of Orange Nassau. She won a bronze medal in Paris at the World Exhibition of 1937; Painter price of Friesland in 1943 and the first international peace prize and Arti Medal in 1971. She was a member of Pulchri Studio, Arti et Amicitiae in Amsterdam, and the Association for Craft and Art Industry (VANK) (since April 1927), the Dutch Watercolourists Circuit, and the Society for the Promotion of Graphic Arts. She etched the illustrations in Adriaan Roland Holst's 1937 book of poems, Een winter aan zee (A Winter at the Sea).

In 1970 funds were made available for the establishment of the Jeanne Oosting Prize, issuing two oeuvre awards each year to artists who work in a figurative style. Since 1994, these awards are given by the Jeanne Oosting Foundation.

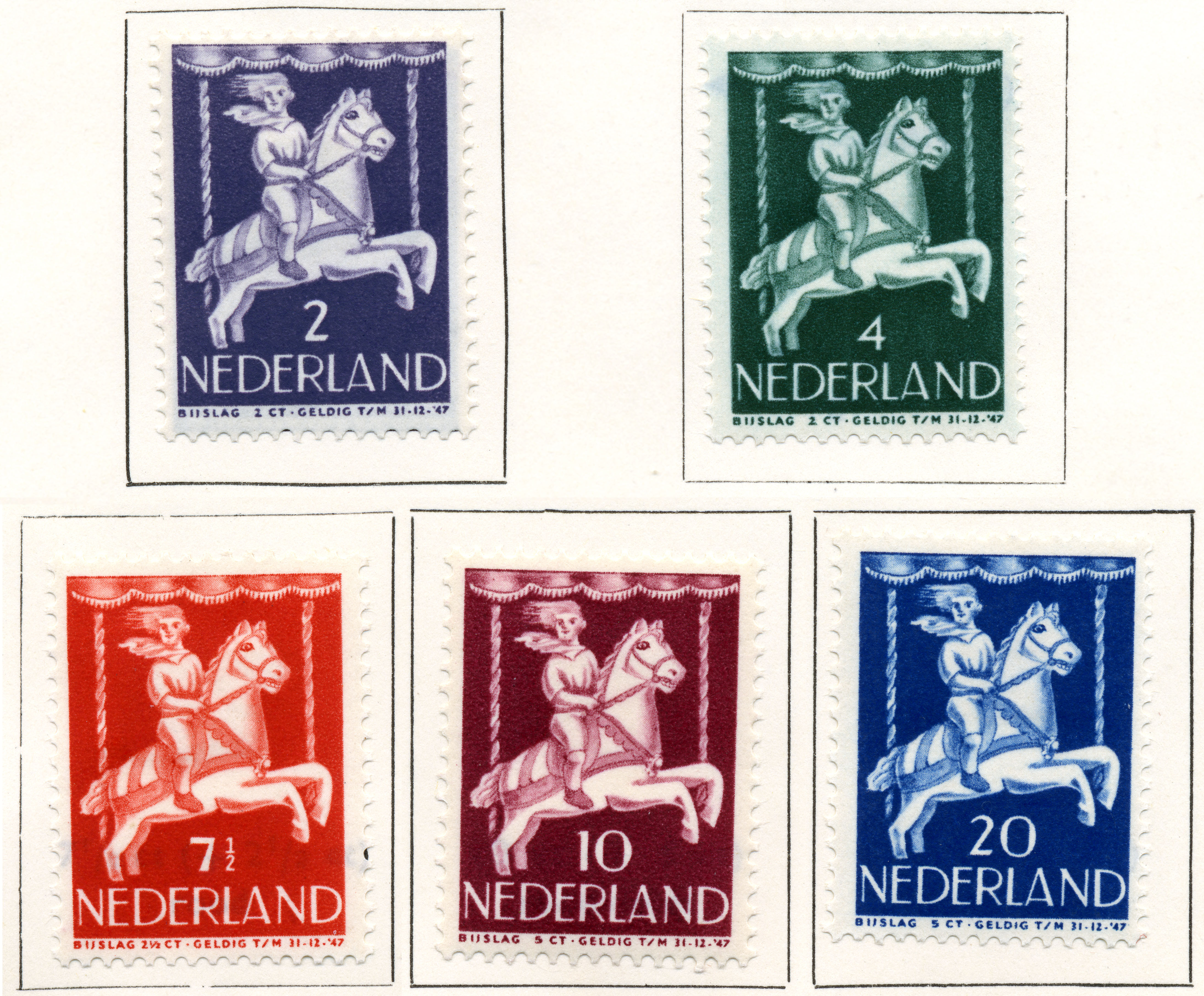
Stamps of the Netherlands, 1946
