= Adri Pieck =

Dutch painter (1894–1982)

- Self-portrait
- Born: Adriana Jacoba Pieck; 29 April 1894; The Hague, Netherlands
- Died: 5 April 1982 (aged 87); Hollandsche Rading, Netherlands
- Education: Rijksakademie van beeldende kunsten
- Known for: Painting

Adriana Jacoba "Adri" Pieck (1894–1982) was a Dutch painter.

== Biography ==
Pieck was born on 29 April 1894 in the Scheveningen section of The Hague. Her sister Margaretha "Gretha" Pieck (1898–1920) was a painter, as was her cousin Anton Franciscus Pieck (1895–1987). She attended the Rijksakademie van beeldende kunsten in Amsterdam. Her teachers included her father, Antonie Pieck (1865–1925) Carel Lodewijk Dake, Willem Knip.

Gretha and Adri exhibited together and shared a studio until Gretha's early death from Spanish influenza in 1920.

Her work was included in the 1939 exhibition and sale Onze Kunst van Heden (Our Art of Today) at the Rijksmuseum in Amsterdam. Pieck was a member of the Gooische Painters Association and the Kunstenaarsvereniging Sint Lucas, exhibiting regularly with the Sint Lucas group from 1915 through 1961.

Pieck was a vegetarian who made her work available to anti-vivisection and animal protection charities. During WW2 the Dutch Vegetarian Association made it possible that members could receive butter vouchers instead of meat ration cards. Pieck was known to have exchanged the cards to feed her cats.

Pieck died in Hollandsche Rading on 5 April 1982.
