= Rachel van Dantzig =

Dutch artist

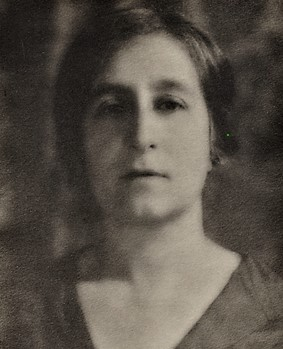
- Rachel van Dantzig (between 1878 and 1949)
- Born: 12 November 1878; Rotterdam, The Netherlands
- Died: 15 February 1949 (aged 70); Auderghem, Belgium
- Known for: Sculptor

Rachel Margaretha van Dantzig (1878–1949) was a Dutch sculptor.

== Biography ==
Van Dantzig was born on 12 November 1878 in Rotterdam. She studied at the Academie voor Beeldende Kunsten (Rotterdam) and the Académie Colarossi (Paris). She was a student of Charles van der Stappen. She exhibited her work from 1903 through 1939.

Van Dantzig was a member of Arti et Amicitiae, Vereeniging Sint Lucas (Amsterdam), Rotterdamse Kunstkring (Rotterdam Art Circle), Kunstenaarsvereniging De Onafhankelijken, and Nederlandse Kring van Beeldhouwers (NKVB) (Dutch Circle of Sculptors). In 1913 she won the 1st class medal at the exhibition De Vrouw 1813-1913 with a sculpture. In 1919 she created a medal for victims of the Jewish Pogroms in Eastern Europe. Van Dantzig's work was included in the 1939 exhibition and sale Onze Kunst van Heden (Our Art of Today) at the Rijksmuseum in Amsterdam.

Van Dantzig died on 15 February 1949 in Auderghem, Belgium.
