= Gretha Pieck =

Dutch artist

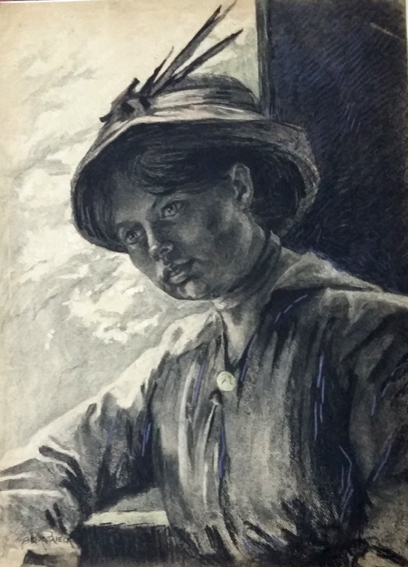
- Portrait of Gretha Pieck by Adri Pieck circa 1918
- Born: Margaretha Pieck; 16 August 1898; Amsterdam, Netherlands
- Died: 31 March 1920 (aged 21); Maartensdijk, Netherlands
- Other names: Margaretha Pieck
- Known for: Painting

Margaretha "Gretha" Pieck (16 August 1898 – 31 March 1920) was a Dutch artist.

== Biography ==
Pieck was born on 16 August 1898 in Amsterdam. Her father, Antonie Pieck (1865–1925) was a painter. Her sister Adriana "Adri" Jacoba Pieck (1894–1982) was a painter, as was her cousin Anton Franciscus Pieck (1895–1987). She studied with Toon de Jong and Willem Knip.

Gretha and Adri exhibited together and shared a studio. Pieck was a member of the Kunstenaarsvereniging Sint Lucas.

Pieck died of Spanish influenza on 31 March 192 in Maartensdijk at the age of 21. Her work is in the collection of the Stedelijk Museum Amsterdam.

== Gallery ==
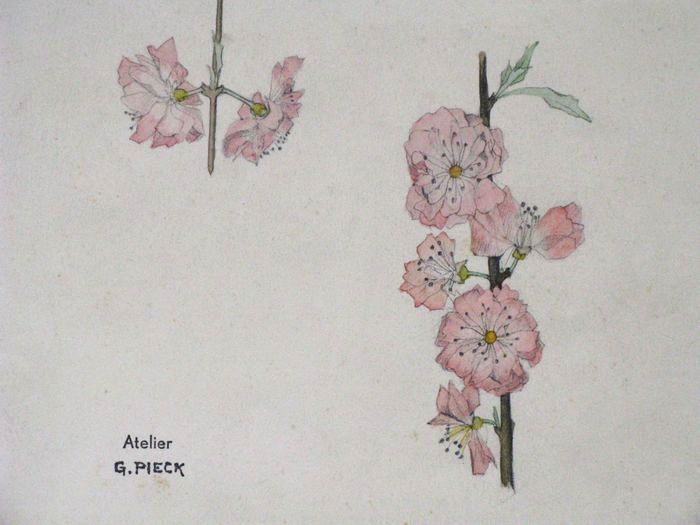
aquarel van bloemen, 1915

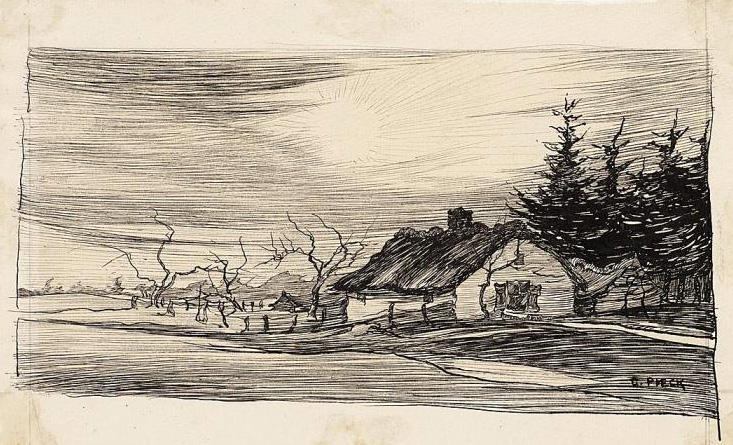
Zandpad naar Vuursche, 1915
