= Margaretha Roosenboom =

19th C. Dutch flower painter

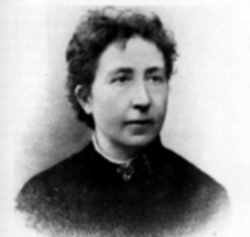
- Born: Margaretha Cornelia Johanna Wilhelmina Roosenboom; 1843
- Died: 1896 (aged 52–53); Voorburg, Netherlands
- Known for: painter
- Spouse: Johannes Gijsbert Vogel

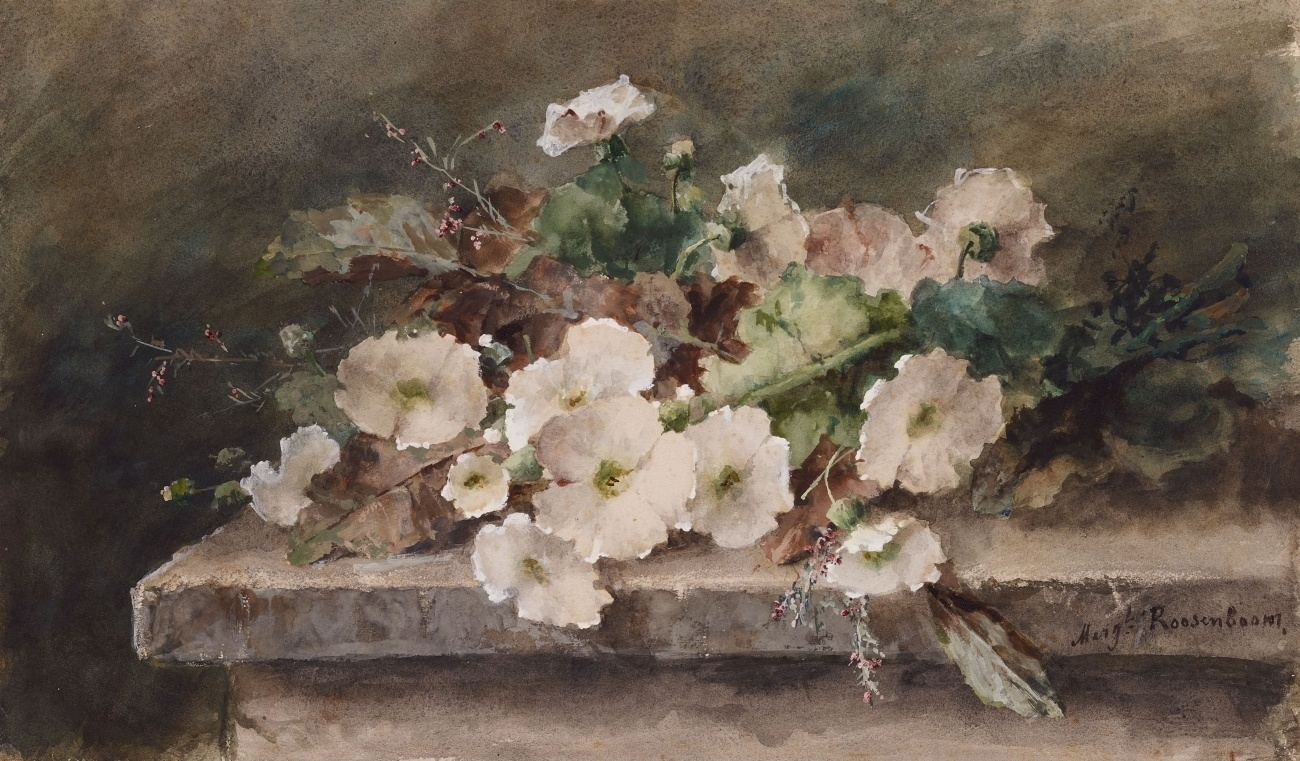
White Mallows on a Stone Table

Margaretha Roosenboom (1843 – 1896), was a 19th-century Dutch flower painter.

== Biography ==
She was born in Voorburg as the daughter of Nicolaas Johannes Roosenboom and Maria Schelfhout, the daughter of Andreas Schelfhout. She was a pupil of her father in Brussels where she grew up, and in 1867 she returned to The Hague to learn watercolour painting from her grandfather. She was a child prodigy who showed her work at Pulchri Studio at the age of 16 though she only became a member there in 1878. In 1887 she moved in with her cousin Maria Henrietta Catherina van Wielik, who was married to the painter Johannes Gijsbert Vogel. After her cousin died in 1892 she married Vogel in the same year in Voorburg.

She sent her work to foreign exhibitions and won prizes at the World's Fair Vienna in 1873, the Chicago World Exposition in 1893, and the World's Fair Atlanta in 1895. She signed her works with Marguerite and is known for fruit and flower still lifes. She had many female pupils, including Adrienne van Hogendorp-s' Jacob and Helene Cramer, who also showed works in Chicago in 1893. She died in Voorburg relatively young from injuries suffered from a fall.
