= 1971 in architecture =

The year 1971 in architecture involved some significant architectural events and new buildings.

== Events ==
- July 19 – The South Tower of the World Trade Center, by Minoru Yamasaki, is topped out at 1,362 feet (415 m), making it the second tallest building in the world.

== Buildings and structures ==
=== Buildings opened ===
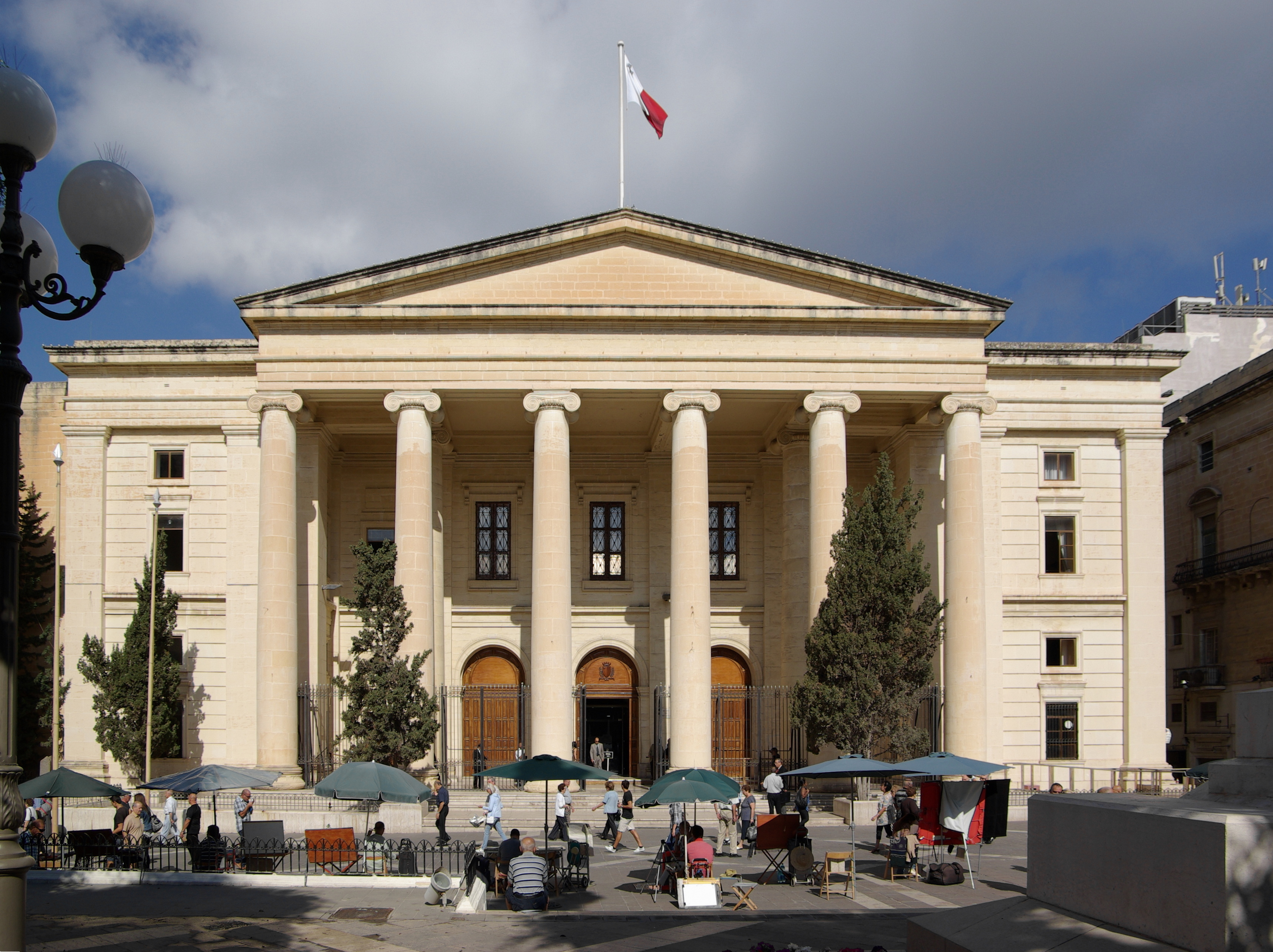
Courts of Justice building in Valletta, Malta

- January 9 – Courts of Justice building in Valletta, Malta
- February 26 – Rothko Chapel in Houston, Texas, United States, designed by Mark Rothko and Philip Johnson.
- May 1 – Näsinneula tower in Tampere, Finland.
- May 9 – Peace Candle of the World, Scappoose, Oregon, USA.
- August – Meritus Mandarin Singapore Hotel Tower 1 in Singapore, designed by Stanley T. S. Leong.
- October 16 – Azadi Tower, originally Shahyad Tower, Tehran, Iran, designed by Hossein Amanat

=== Buildings completed ===
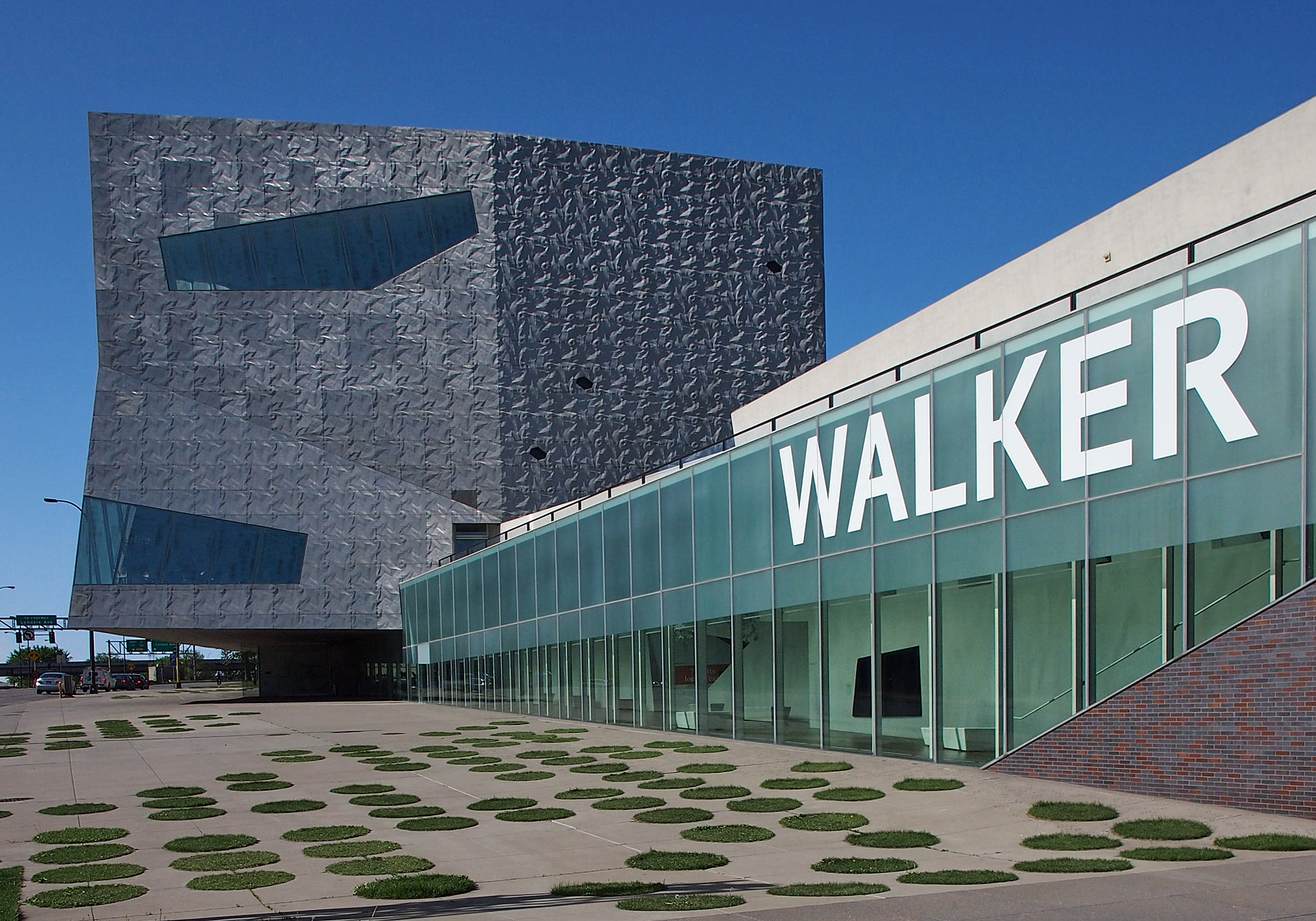
New Walker Art Center in Minneapolis, USA

- April – Hillbrow Tower in Johannesburg, South Africa.
- May – New Walker Art Center in Minneapolis, designed by Edward Larrabee Barnes.
- Marsham Towers, three 20-storey tower blocks for the Department of the Environment atop a 5-storey linking building at Marsham Street in Westminster, London, designed by Eric Bedford (demolished 2002–03).
- Mausoleum of Mohammed V, Rabat, Morocco.
- Maupoleum in Amsterdam, designed by Piet Zanstra (demolished 1994).
- Danmarks Nationalbank headquarters, Copenhagen, designed by Arne Jacobsen with Hans Dissing and Otto Weitling.
- Carmel de la Paix in Mazille, Saône-et-Loire, France, designed by Josep Lluís Sert.
- Fred. Olsen Lines terminal, London Docklands, the first major design of Foster Associates.
- Summerland Leisure Complex in Douglas, Isle of Man (destroyed by fire 1973).
- Ukrainian Institute of Scientific Research and Development, Kyiv, designed by L. Novikov and F. Yurijev.
- Redcar Library, England, designed by Ahrends, Burton and Koralek (demolished 2011).
- Villa Gontero, Cumiana, Italy, designed by Carlo Graffi.
- Anderton House, Rigg Side, Goodleigh, North Devon, England, designed by Peter Aldington and John Craig.
- Usdan Student Center, Brandeis University, designed by Hugh Stubbins

== Awards ==
- AIA Gold Medal – Louis Kahn
- Architecture Firm Award – Albert Kahn Associates, Inc.
- RAIA Gold Medal – Frederick Lucas
- RIBA Royal Gold Medal – Hubert de Cronin Hastings
- Twenty-five Year Award – Crow Island School

== Births ==
- May 7 – Marco Casagrande, Finnish architect, environmental artist, architectural theorist, writer and professor of architecture
- May 17 – Martin Aunin, Estonian architect
- Carlo Ratti, Italian-born architect and urban theorist
- Rocio Romero, Chilean-born architect

== Deaths ==
- March 24 – Arne Jacobsen, Danish architect and designer (born 1902)
- August 1 – Vincent Harris, English architect (born 1876)
- August 28 – Edith Hughes, Britain's first professionally practising woman architect (born 1888)
- October 16 – Robin Boyd, Australian architect (born 1919)
- November 23 – Bertalan Árkay, Hungarian architect (born 1901)
