= Maup Caransa =

Dutch businessman

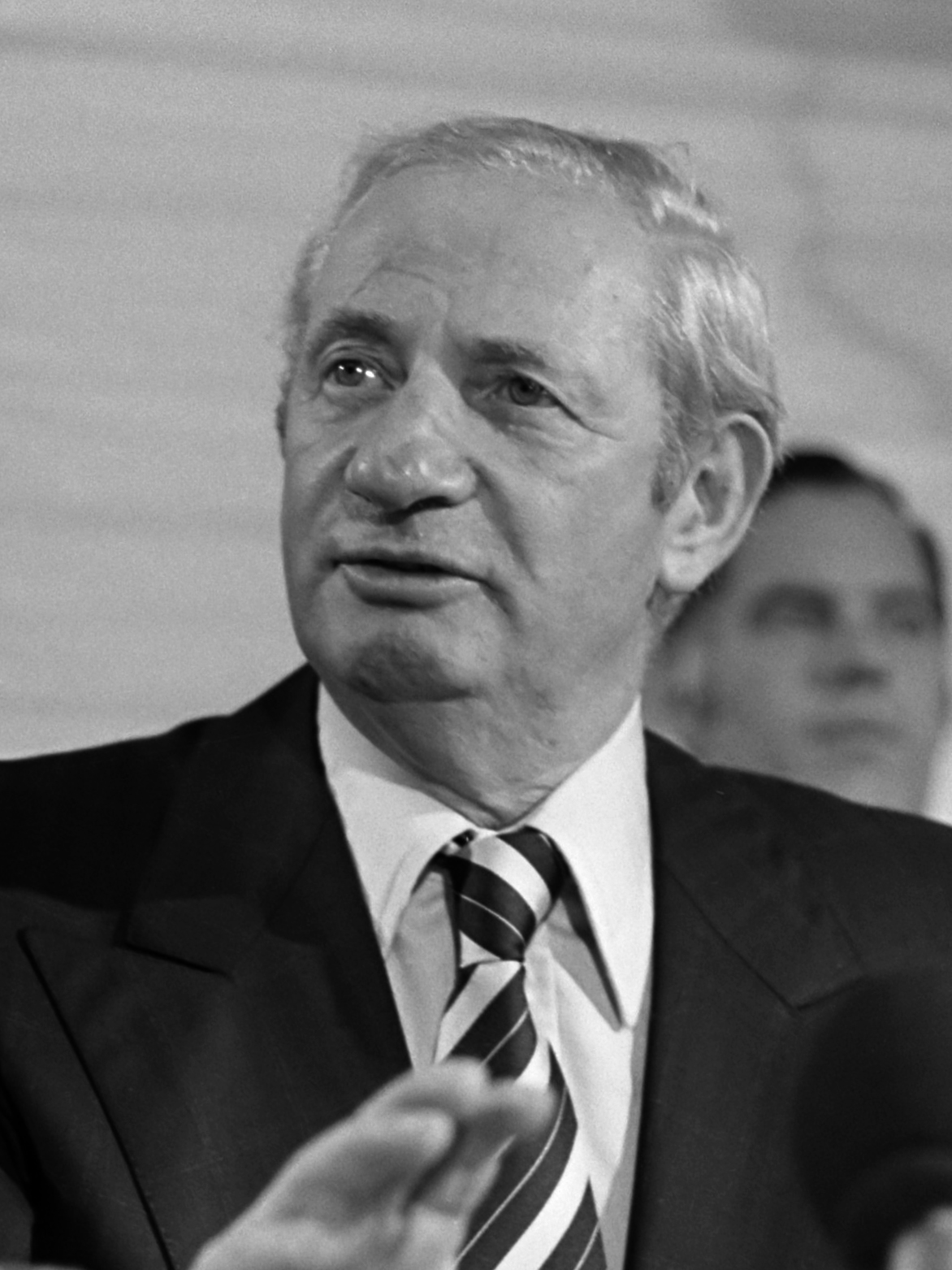
- Maup Caransa, after being released by his kidnappers (1977)
- Born: Maurits Caransa; 5 January 1916; Amsterdam, Netherlands
- Died: 6 August 2009 (aged 93); Vinkeveen, Netherlands
- Occupations: Businessman; Real estate developer
- Known for: Being a kidnapping victim Founding and owning multiple notable buildings in Amsterdam

Maurits "Maup" Caransa (5 January 1916 – 6 August 2009) was a Dutch businessman who became one of the most important real-estate developers in post-World War II Amsterdam. Caransa was the first well-known Dutch person to be kidnapped for ransom. Caransa owned and built many notable buildings in Amsterdam including the Maupoleum (now demolished) and the Caransa Hotel (still standing on the Rembrandtplein). He influenced the Amsterdam football club AFC Ajax, through his friendship with its chairman, and by supporting the team and players financially.

== Biography ==
Caransa was born on 5 January 1916 into a family of Sephardi Jews in Amsterdam. He grew up poor, and had his first paying job at age 5. At age 16, according to a well-known story, he bought a wrecked car for one and a half guilders, sold the parts for profit, then bought more cars.

=== World War II ===
During World War II, according to Frank Bovenkerk, emeritus professor of criminal science in Utrecht, Caransa, angered by the anti-Jewish violence of the NSB (National Socialist Movement in the Netherlands), joined one of the many knokploegen, "assault groups" that in turn beat up on NSB members and especially members of the WA (Weerbaarheidsafdeling), the NSB's violent paramilitary wing. After the war, Caransa would not speak of these matters, saying it brought back too many painful memories. Before the February strike in response to Nazi pogroms, almost all of Caransa's family, including his brother Joel who lived next door to him, had already been arrested. His sister Femma managed to hide, while Maup himself reported at Westerbork transit camp after his parents were taken there. He spent a week with them but was let go, while his parents were deported to Germany. His parents and his three brothers died in Nazi concentration camps. Because he married a Catholic woman in 1941 and did not appear stereotypically Jewish to the Nazis and their allies (he had blond, almost red hair and light-blue eyes), he was "destarred" after having agreed to sterilisation. He survived the war living in the Jodenbuurt, the Jewish quarter of Amsterdam; he and his sister were the family's only survivors.

=== After the war: trade and real estate ===
After the war he began a career as a military surplus trader (Dutch: dumphandel), selling leftover material from British and US forces. In 1958, de Volkskrant described Caransa's stock in Amsterdam's Entrepot dock, listing hundreds of trucks, bulldozers, and other vehicles (to be shipped to Thailand, Singapore, and the Middle East) and five German E-boats (for France and Spain). Caransa invested his profits in real estate, and when the dump trade fell flat he continued as a real-estate developer, becoming a millionaire. He owned the Schiller Hotel, much of the Rembrandtplein (where he had Piet Zanstra build the Caransa Hotel), and had bought and sold the Amstel Hotel and the Hotel Americain—he owned almost all of the luxury hotels in the city. One of his treasured acquisitions was De Doelen, another luxury hotel; as a child, when he was unable to fall asleep, his mother would tell him to "go sleep in De Doelen".

Toward the end of his life he had acquired many of the properties in the Jodenbuurt. He financed the building of the Maupoleum (also by Piet Zanstra), widely cited as ugly, and as the ugliest building in the city or even the country. It was officially named the Burgemeester Tellegenhuis but came to be called after Caransa, the name being a combination of "Maup" and "mausoleum".

=== Ajax ===
In the 1960s and 1970s Caransa was involved with the Amsterdam football club Ajax. He was a close friend of Ajax chairman Jaap van Praag, was often seen in the Ajax offices, and frequently traveled with the team, which he most likely supported financially—at the time Ajax was not as popular or rich as it later became. He was asked to take a financial interest in the team as well but apparently said there were too many amateurs in the organization. During Van Praag's chairmanship, however, Ajax grew and developed a reputation for success and wealth, for which Caransa's money, which supported the team and its players, was partly responsible. On occasion, the club, which has a number of nicknames including "Sons of the Gods", was referred to as "Caransajax".

=== Kidnapping ===
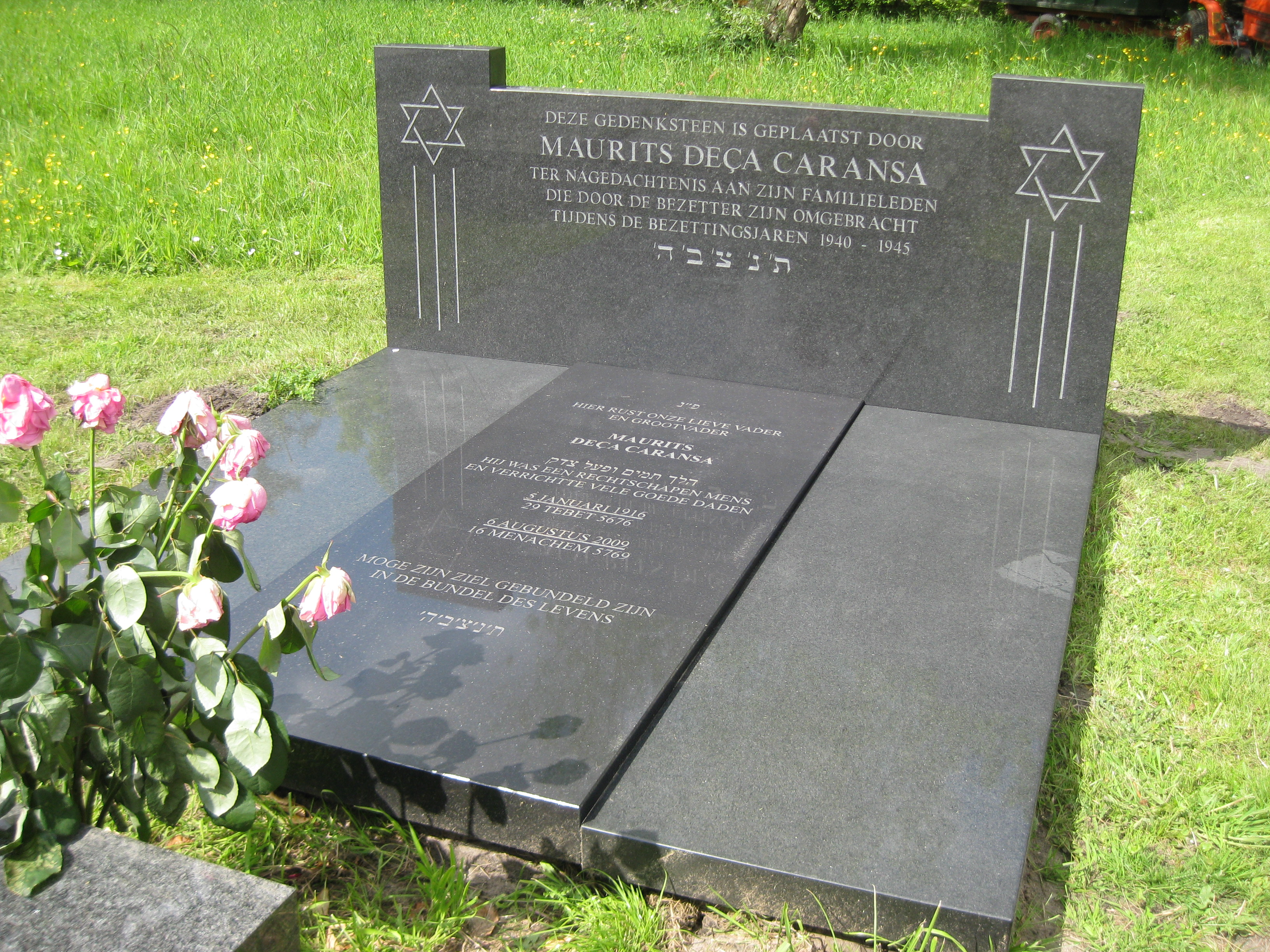
Caransa's gravestone, with a memorial stone he had raised in remembrance of his family members who were murdered in the Holocaust

In 1977, he was kidnapped on leaving the Continental Club after his customary weekly game of bridge and held for five days; he was released after a reported payment of ten million guilders in ransom. The kidnappers were never found.

Caransa was the first well-known Dutch person to be held for ransom. During his captivity, though, Caransa continued to negotiate: his kidnappers wanted 40 million, and he offered 300,000. The ten million was paid with marked money; by 2009, about a half a million guilders had been recovered. An Italian member of the Mafia was caught after depositing 480 of the 1000-guilder notes, but he refused to talk.

=== Later life and death ===
In November 1977 he opened a bridge tournament, one of the first public events after his release, and joked that two minutes of applause for him at the occasion was better than two minutes of silence. His love of bridge only became well publicized after the kidnapping; from 1971 to 1988. He sponsored bridge tournaments that brought the world's best players to Amsterdam, and supported a semi-professional team for three years.

Caransa's real estate company, the Caransa Group, is run by two of his grandchildren; the year before his death he ranked 186 on the list of the 500 richest Dutch people, with an estimated 161 million euro. He died in Vinkeveen on 6 August 2009, and was buried in the country's oldest Jewish cemetery, Beth Haim in Ouderkerk aan de Amstel.

== See also ==
- List of kidnappings
- List of solved missing person cases
