= American Hotel, Amsterdam =

Hotel in Amsterdam, Netherlands

Clayton Hotel Amsterdam American
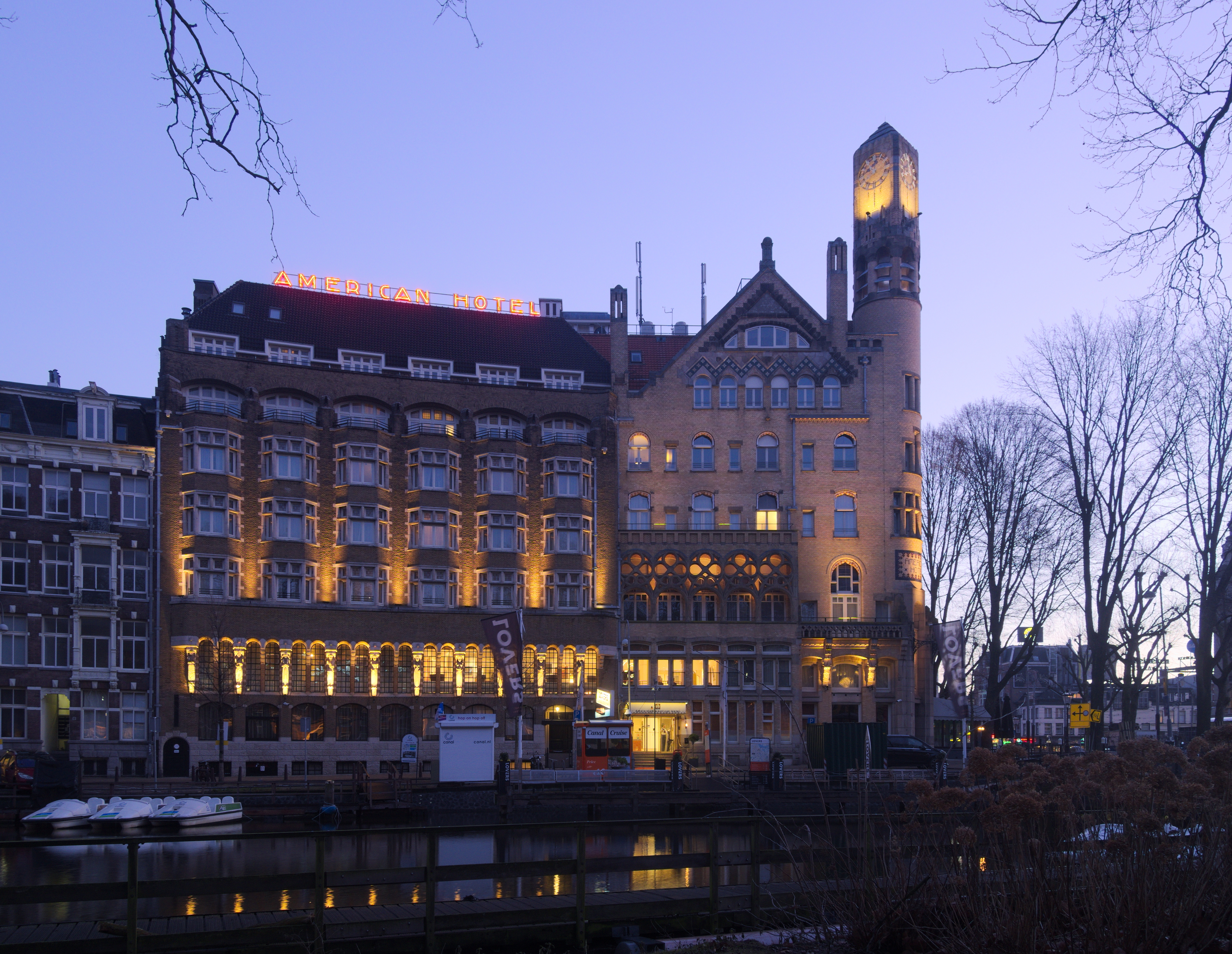
- The hotel in 2017

- Location within Amsterdam

General information
- Location: Amsterdam, Netherlands
- Coordinates: 52°21′50″N 4°52′53″E
- Opening: 1902

The Clayton Hotel Amsterdam American, known for its Café Américain, on Leidseplein in Amsterdam, Netherlands, is a hotel and café restaurant with a Jugendstil reading room.

== History ==
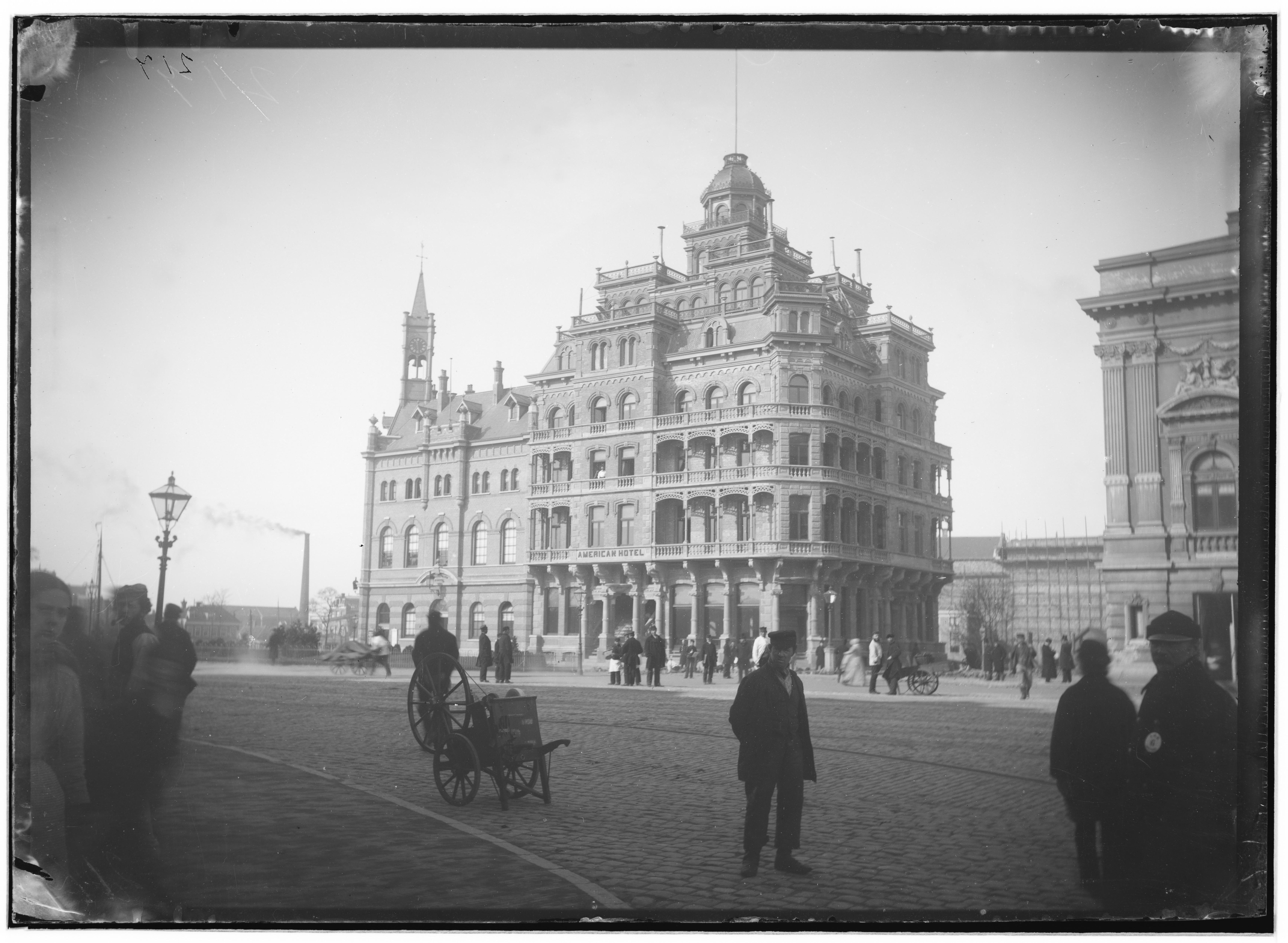
The first American Hotel, 1880s

The first American Hotel was built on the Leidesplein in 1882. Designed by architect Cornelis Steinigeweg, it shared the block with a police station and a fire station. It closed in 1900 and the entire block was demolished for construction of the current structure, built from 1900-1902 to designs by W.Kromhout and H.G. Jansen in the Berlage style. In 1927–1928 an expansion was built, designed by architect G.J. Rutgers in collaboration with K. Bakker. Both the expansion and the café are National Heritage sites. The hotel was extended again in 1954.

In April 1970, UK-based Grand Metropolitan bought the hotel, along with the nearby Amstel Hotel for $2.4 million from Maup Caransa. In 1981, Grand Metropolitan bought Inter-Continental Hotels from Pan Am. On 1 April 1982, Grand Metropolitan merged their existing chain of 17 Grand Metropolitan Hotels into Inter-Continental, with the American Hotel placed in its sibling chain, Forum Hotels Around 2000, it was transferred to InterContinental's Crowne Plaza division and renamed the Crowne Plaza American Hotel Amsterdam. In 2005, InterContinental Hotels sold the hotel to Eden Hotels, and it was renamed Eden Amsterdam American Hotel.

In January 2019, the owners signed a contract with Hard Rock International to rebrand the hotel, and in June 2020, it was renamed Hard Rock Hotel Amsterdam American. In September 2023, the hotel was acquired by Dalata Hotel Group and renamed Clayton Hotel Amsterdam American.
