= Zomerdijkstraat =

Street in Amsterdam

Coordinates: 52°20′33″N 4°54′13″E

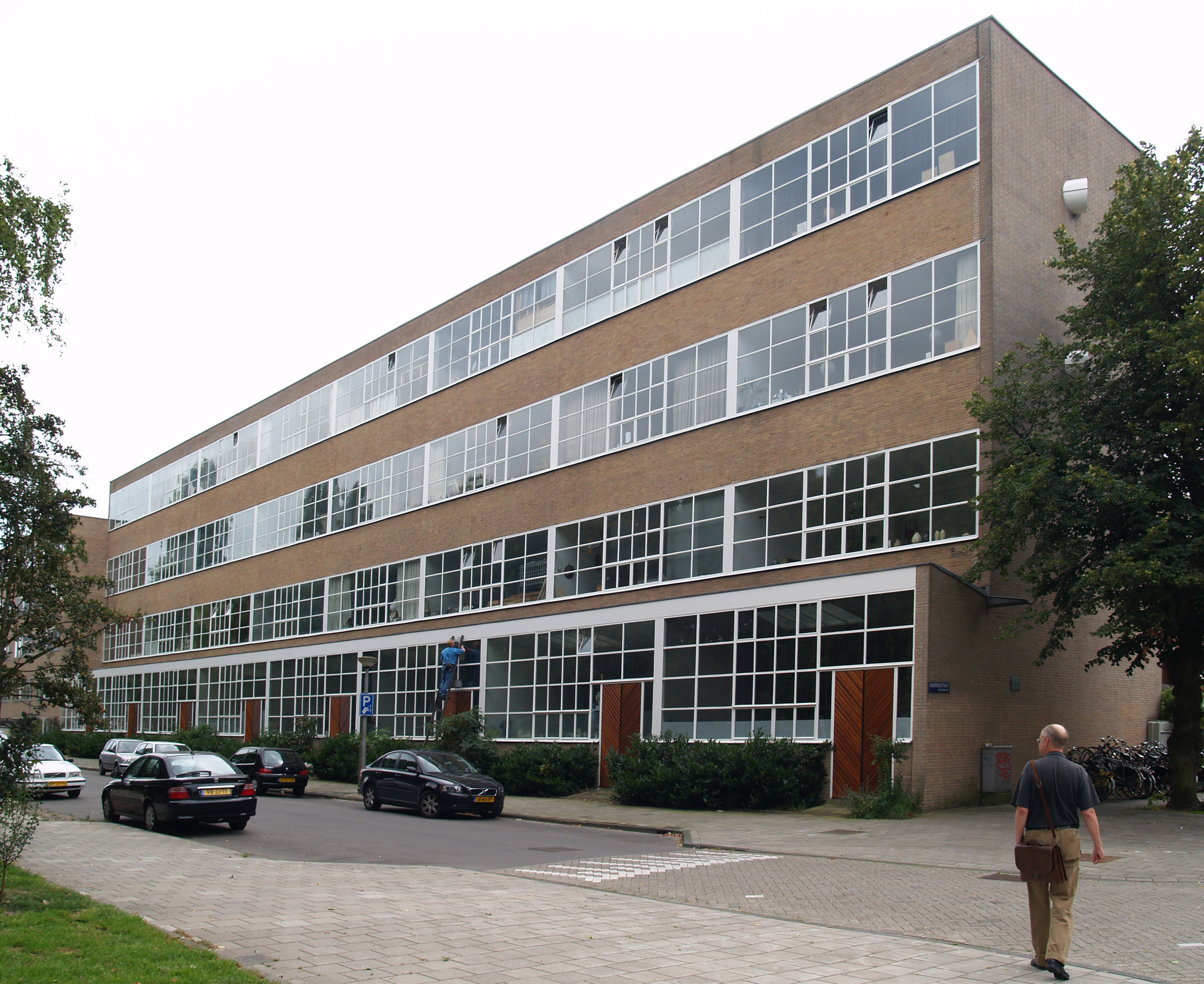
North face

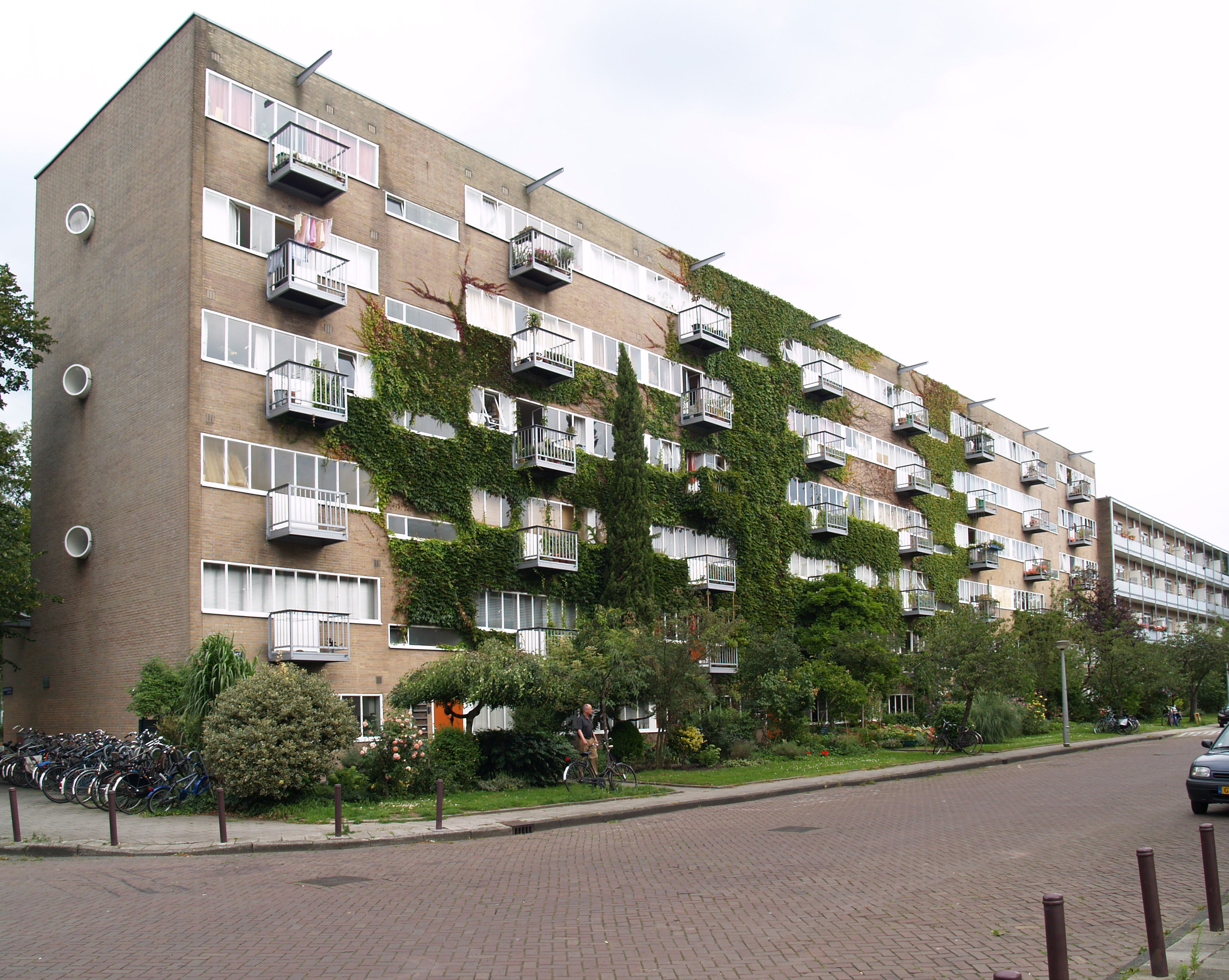
South face

The Zomerdijkstraat is a small street in the Amsterdam neighborhood Rivierenbuurt, consisting of apartment buildings and a hallmark building, the studio complex at the Zomerdijkstraat. A classified monument, the building was designed by the functionalist architects Piet Zanstra, J.H.L. Giesen en K.L. Sijmons.

The building is a pivotal work in Dutch architecture of the early thirties. The architects were members of "Groep 32", strongly inspired by the work of Le Corbusier. They combined a functional architecture with artistic elements, of which the studio apartment block is a prime example.

Artists living and working in the studios included Gerrit van der Veen, Charlotte van Pallandt, Paul Grégoire, Jan Wolkers, Cees Kortlang, Jaap Wagemaker, John Grosman, Jet Schepp, Piet Esser, Fred Carasso, Hendrika van Gelder, Ro Mogendorff and Bernard de Wolff.

The Amsterdam municipality sold the building in 1990 for one guilder to Woonstichting Lieven de Key, a housing foundation. The unique zoning destination, namely artist studios and residences, was in 2012 changed to residential. The housing foundation decided to rent the apartments only to young artists between 18 and 28 years, for a period up to 5 years. Applicants are selected by the Commissie voor Ateliers en Woon/werkpanden (Commission for Studios and Residential/work spaces).
