= Maupoleum =

Burgemeester Tellegenhuis Maupoleum
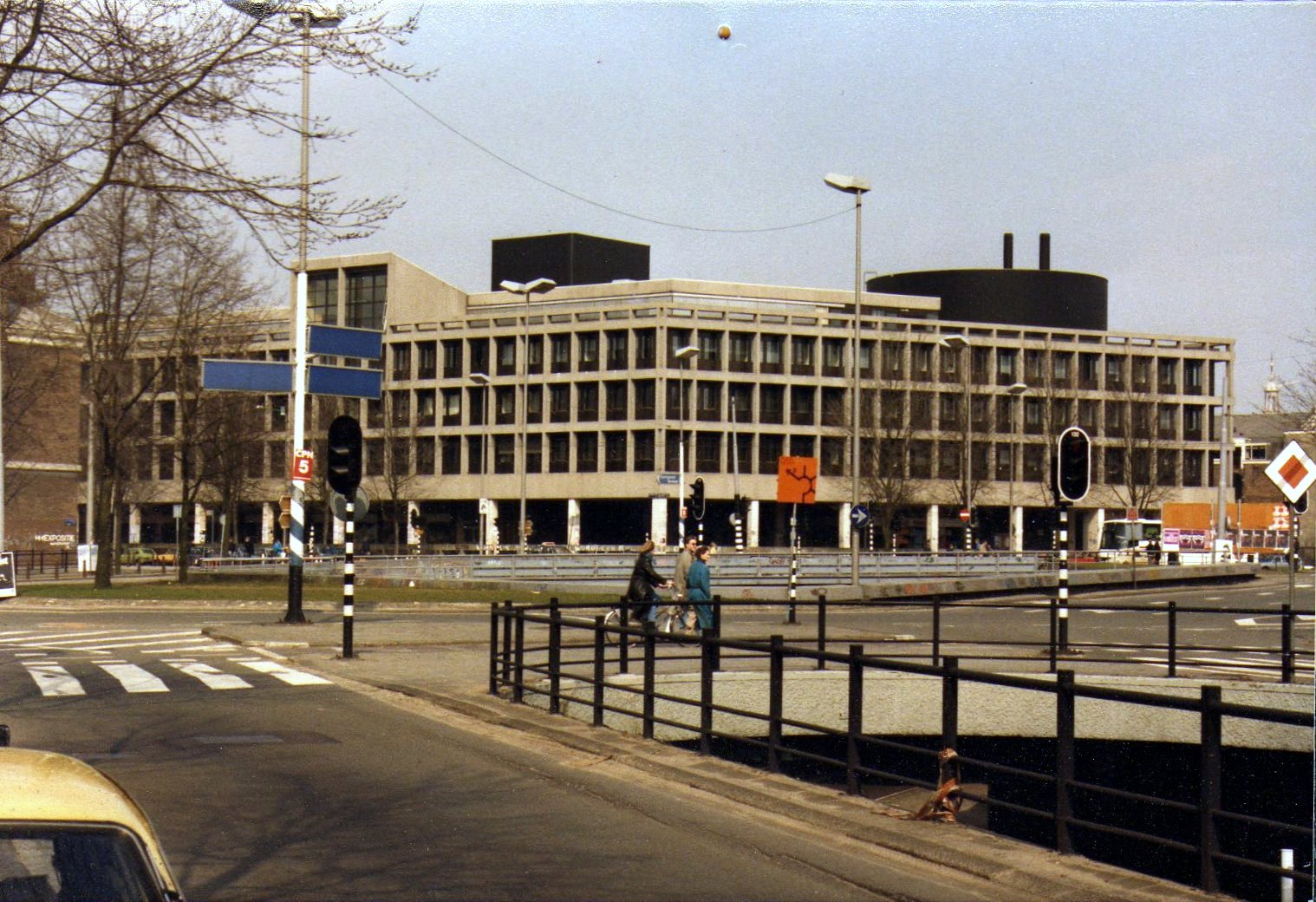
- Maupoleum
- Interactive map of the Burgemeester Tellegenhuis; Maupoleum area

General information
- Location: Jodenbreestraat, Amsterdam, Netherlands
- Coordinates: 52°22′9.34″N 4°54′10.32″E
- Completed: 1971
- Demolished: 1994
- Owner: Philips' retirement fund

Design and construction
- Architect: Piet Zanstra

The Maupoleum (1971–1994) was a building on Amsterdam's Jodenbreestraat. Built in 1971, it acquired a reputation for being unattractive before being demolished in 1994.

== History ==
The Waterlooplein area of Amsterdam had been a mostly Jewish neighborhood. After World War II, during which much of its population was removed, the area was a "depopulated, impoverished neighbourhood". Plans to rebuild the area included a "circulation route" to open up the inner city, which was to run from the Amstel station to the Centraal station. The northeastern side of the Jodenbreestraat had been designated as a market in a 1953 city plan, but in 1968 these plans were adapted and a mixed building, combining office space for the University of Amsterdam with space for the textile wholesalers of the nearby Sint Antoniesbreestraat.

The building's location was alongside a planned four-lane highway; in the end, that highway was scrapped and the further demolition necessary for the project was halted after the Nieuwmarkt Riots of 1975. In addition, the "Central Business District", which the city had envisioned as large enough to include the new building, was never extended as far. As a result, the Maupoleum remained isolated, without an environment to blend in: "What should have been a marked orchestration of the flow to and from the city centre was now reduced to an incursion, a mere incident. The Maupoleum was made to look ridiculous: 'It’s standing alone there out on a limb', [its building's architect Piet] Zanstra conceded some years later".

The building was designed by architect Piet Zanstra and built by a consortium of real estate developers that included the well-known businessman Maup Caransa, funded by technology manufacturer Philips's retirement fund. Though it was officially named "Burgemeester Tellegenhuis", after former Amsterdam mayor Jan Willem Tellegen, it received its nickname as a play on "mausoleum" and Caransa's first name. It was 180m long and housed offices and classrooms for the University of Amsterdam, and initially the Amsterdam beauty commission thought it attractive enough, and "only one member of the amenities authority questioned 'whether this modern architecture might clash with the surrounding development'". However, it quickly acquired a reputation for being the ugliest building in the country, "one of the most horrible buildings one could imagine", according to urban planning historian Cordula Rooijendijk. Architect Jaap Huisman, publisher of a survey of the fifty ugliest buildings in the country, gave the building an "honourable place" and commented that it was "presumably the most hated building in the centre of Amsterdam", and Denise van Hoogstraten, in an article in architectural magazine Volume, even compared it to an abscess: "The carbuncle had to be cut away". Although a paragon of Brutalist architecture, for its out-of-placeness the "grey, looming giant came to symbolize the arrogant, large-scale plans of the Amsterdam municipality" for many Amsterdammers. Van Hoogstraten also used the language of symbolism: the Maupoleum "symbolize[d] all that was ugly and lacking in quality".

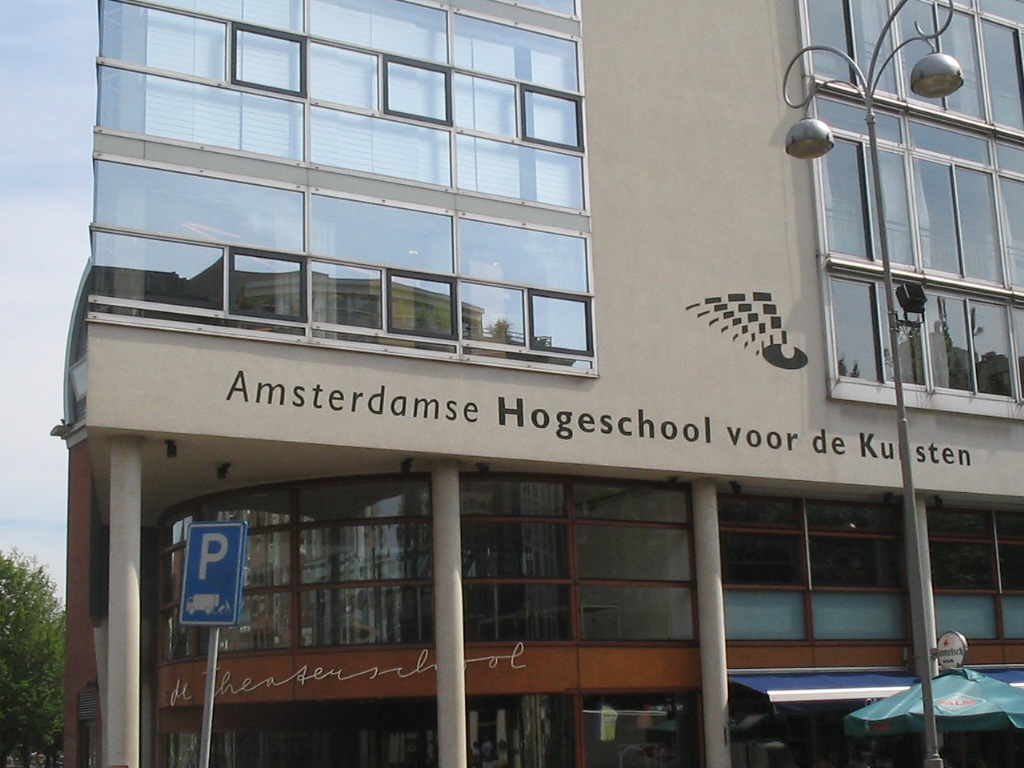
The Amsterdam School of the Arts is housed in the new building

Though there were some efforts to preserve the Maupoleum as an example of 1960s architecture, the building was demolished in 1994, to the relief of many. The work was done by Utrecht company Van Vliet, and generated 11,000 tons of rubble and 700 tons of refuse. The basements were left intact, and on top of that two separate buildings were built: a Teun Koolhaas-designed building for the Amsterdam School of the Arts and an office building housing Municipal offices, and on the ground floor a supermarket Albert Heijn. The brick buildings have shops and cafes on the ground floor, partly behind a shopping arcade. The Maupoleum was criticized for its size and dead plinth, the new buildings - although constructed on the same building lines, have escaped such criticism: * it's two buildings instead of one huge building; * their size and style are much more aligned with the surrounding buildings, they are more 'human'; * the existing street under the Maupoleum is now in between the two buildings, it has literally been uncovered; * the plinth and arcade have become part of streetlife.
