= Martin Aunin =

Estonian architect (born 1971)

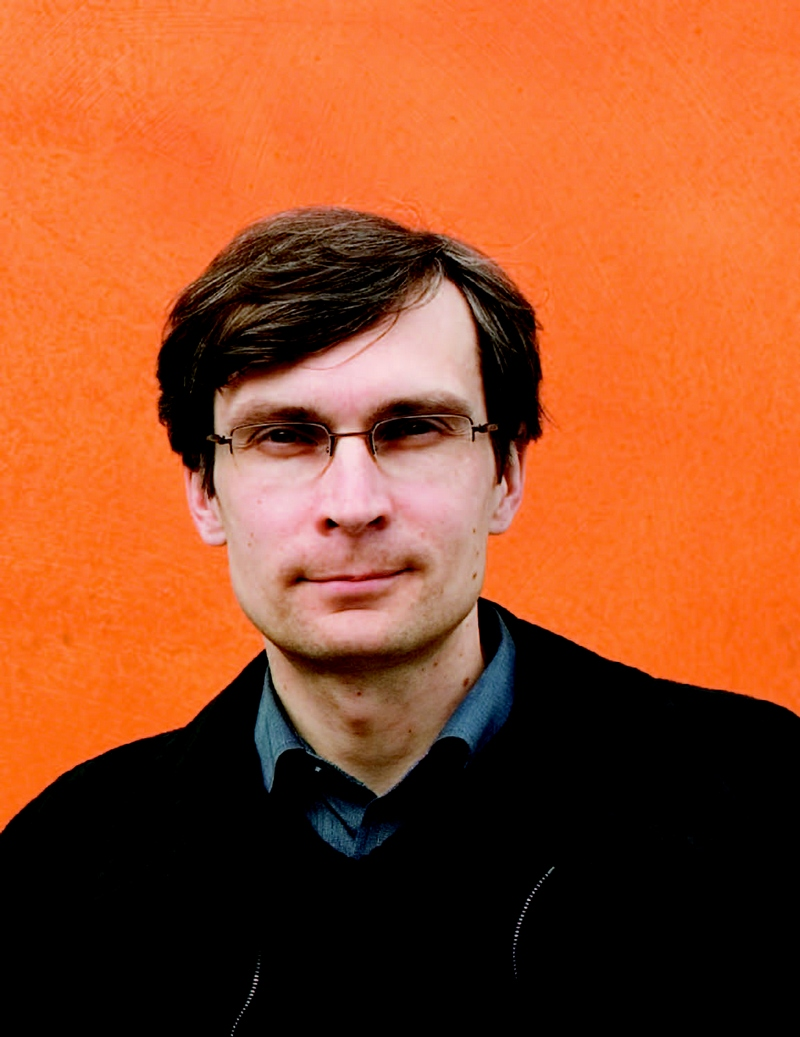
Martin Aunin in 2007

Martin Aunin (born 17 May 1971) is an Estonian architect.

Aunin was born in Tartu. From 1989 he studied in the Tallinn University of Arts (today's Estonian Academy of Arts) in the department of architecture. He graduated from the university in 1993. From 1993 to 1994 he studied in the Technical University of Helsinki. In 1997 he received his MA in architecture from the Estonian Academy of Arts and from the Technical University of Helsinki.

From 1991 to present Aunin has worked in various architectural bureaus - Architectural Bureau Masso & Luup, Rein Murula Architectural Bureau, Kalle Rõõmus Architectural Bureau, Masso Architectural Bureau. From 1997 Martin Aunin has mainly worked for EA-Reng architectural, planning and building bureau. Most notable works by Martin Aunin include Lemon department store, Viimsi St. James' Church in Viimsi, single-family home in Tabasalu, Hotel Ülemiste and Hotel Telegraaf in the old town of Tallinn. Martin Aunin has also been successful in many national and international architectural competitions and has received many architectural awards.

== Works ==
- apartment building in Tallinn, 1994
- apartment building in Kaupmehe street, 1995
- hotel Domina City in Tallinn, 2001
- Lemon department store, 2001
- Villa Orro in Tabasalu, 2003
- Hotel Ülemiste in Tallinn, 2004
- Tetris office building in Tallinn, 2004
- single-family home in Matka street, 2004
- hotel Telegraaf in Tallinn, 2007
- St. James's Church in Viimsi, 2007

== Competitions ==
- pedestrian bridge in Paide, 2003; 1. prize
- planning competition for the Aegna island, 2004; 2. prize
- housing competition for Logi street 8 and 10, 2005 (with Martin Melioranski); 1. prize
- housing competition for the old Tondi military base, 2005 (with Martin Melioranski); 1. prize
- Joint building for ministries, 2007 (with Martin Melioranski); 1. prize
- Art Hotel Tallinn, 2008 (with Martin Melioranski); 1. prize

== Awards ==
- Architectural prize of the Estonian Cultural Endowment, 2004
- Concrete Building 2004
- Concrete Building 2005
- Concrete building 2007
