= Piet Zanstra =

Dutch architect

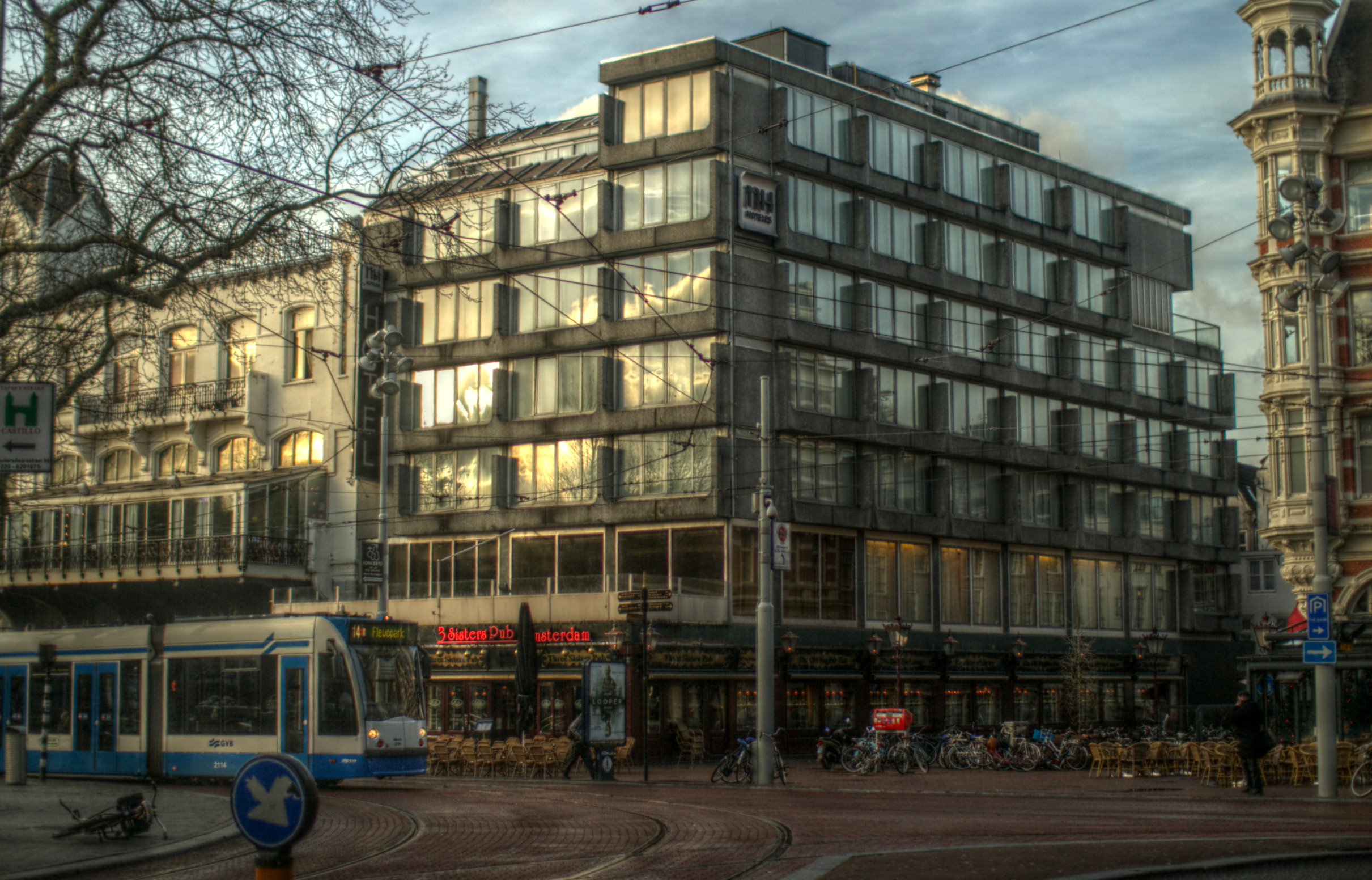
Caransa Hotel

Piet Zanstra (1905-2003) was a Dutch architect who designed a number of important buildings in Amsterdam in the post-World War II period. He is best known, perhaps, for his Maupoleum, which was demolished in 1994, and for the Caransa Hotel, which still stands on the Rembrandtplein.

== Biography ==
Zanstra was born in Leeuwarden, on 7 August 1905. He studied hydraulics there and became apprenticed to an architect. Soon he worked with notable architects such as W. M. Dudok and J. P. Kloos, and in 1932 started a design studio with Jan Giesen and Karel Sijmons. With them he built a combined studio/apartment building on the Zomerdijkstraat in Amsterdam, now hailed as an early example of what in Dutch architecture is called Nieuwe Bouwen. With his two colleagues Zanstra belonged to an architects' society called Group '32, a gathering of functionalist architects who were inspired by Le Corbusier in particular.

He founded ZZDP in 1954, which became one of the largest architectural firms in the country in the 1960s and 1970s and built such notable buildings as the Rembrandt Tower.

== Notable buildings ==
- Artists' studios and apartments on the Zomerdijkstraat, in the Amsterdam neighborhood Rivierenbuurt (1934, with Jan Giessen and Karel Sijmons).
- Europarking, parking garage on the Marnixstraat, Amsterdam (1971, with Ab Gmelig Meyling and Peter de Clercq Zubli)
- The Maupoleum or 'Burgemeester Tellegenhuis' in Amsterdam, built 1971. Public opinion on this office building was overwhelmingly negative, and by the time it was demolished in 1994 it was known as 'the ugliest building of Amsterdam'.

== Gallery ==
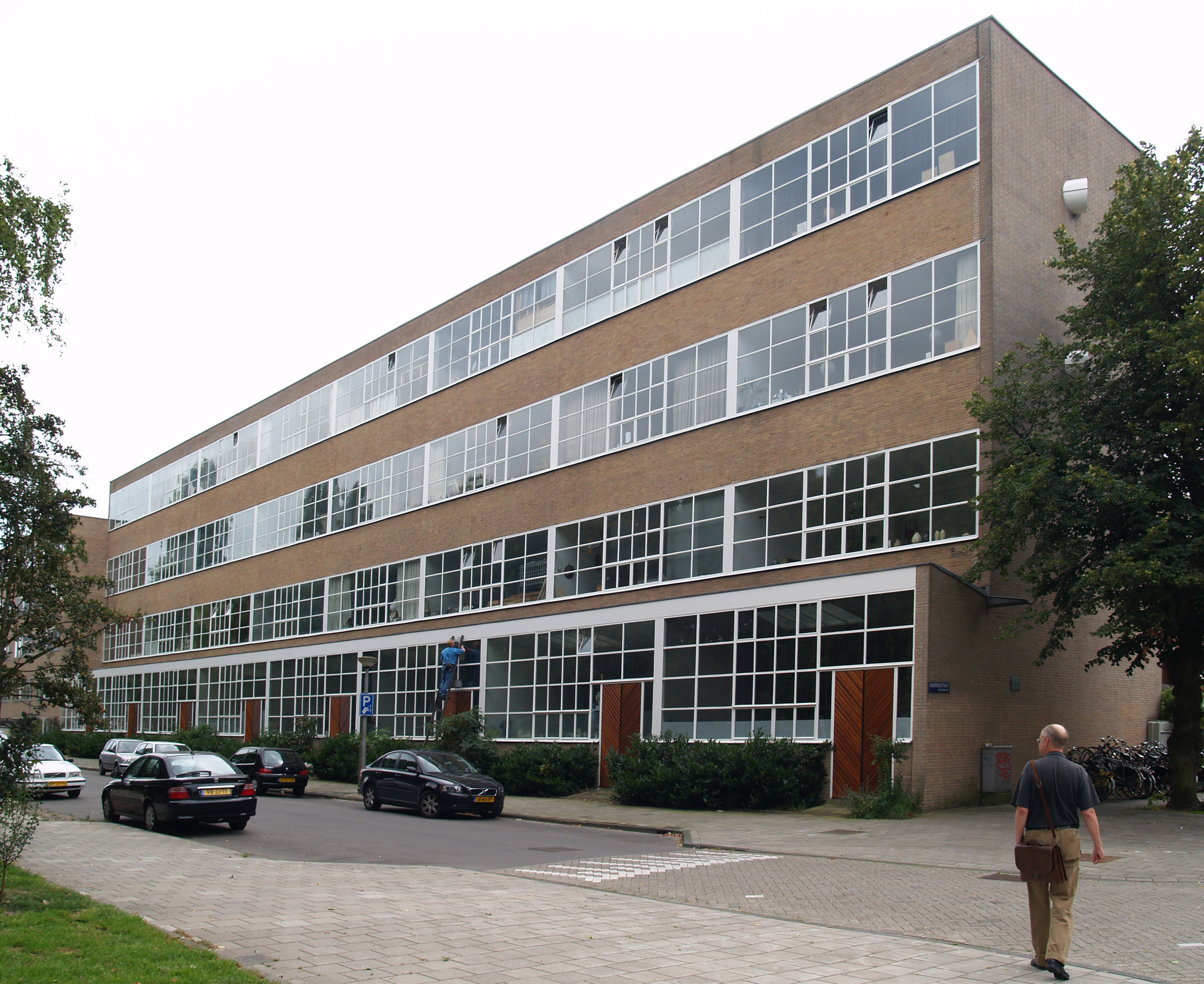
Zomerdijkstraat, north face

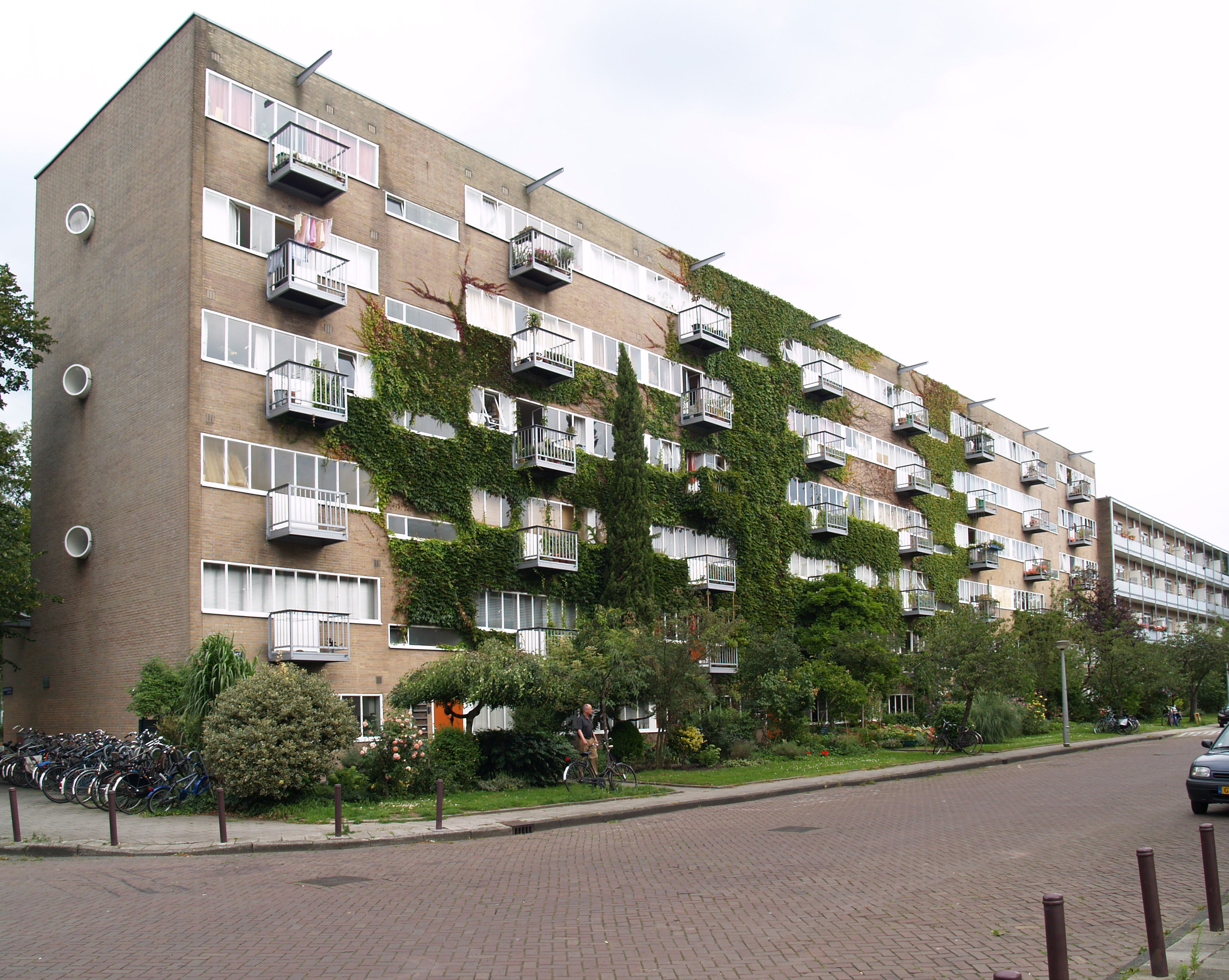
Zomerdijkstraat, south face

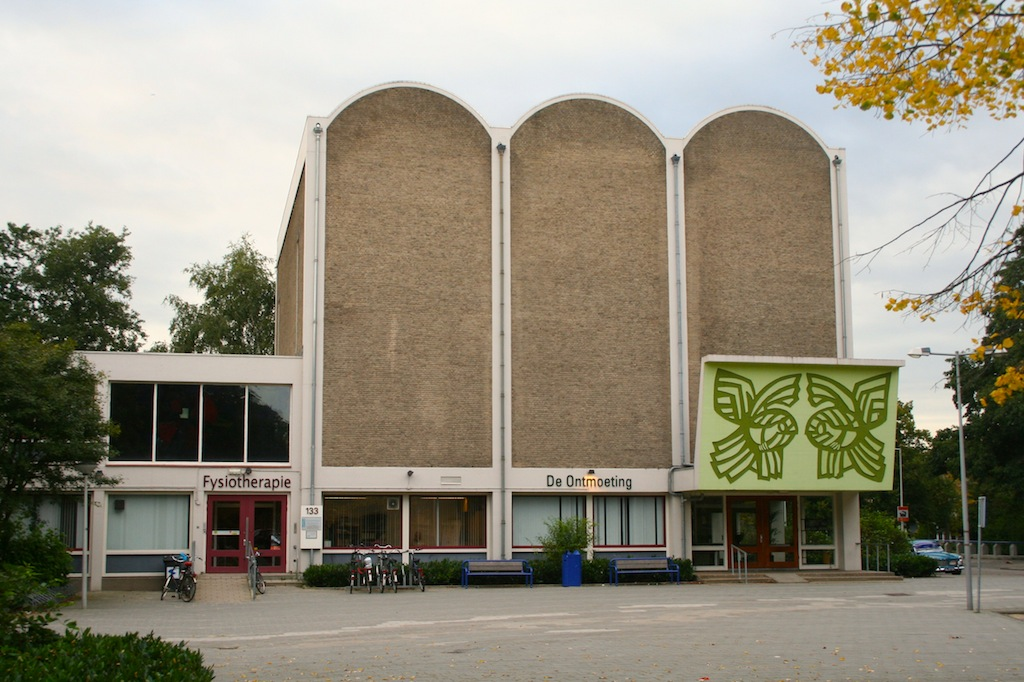
Church

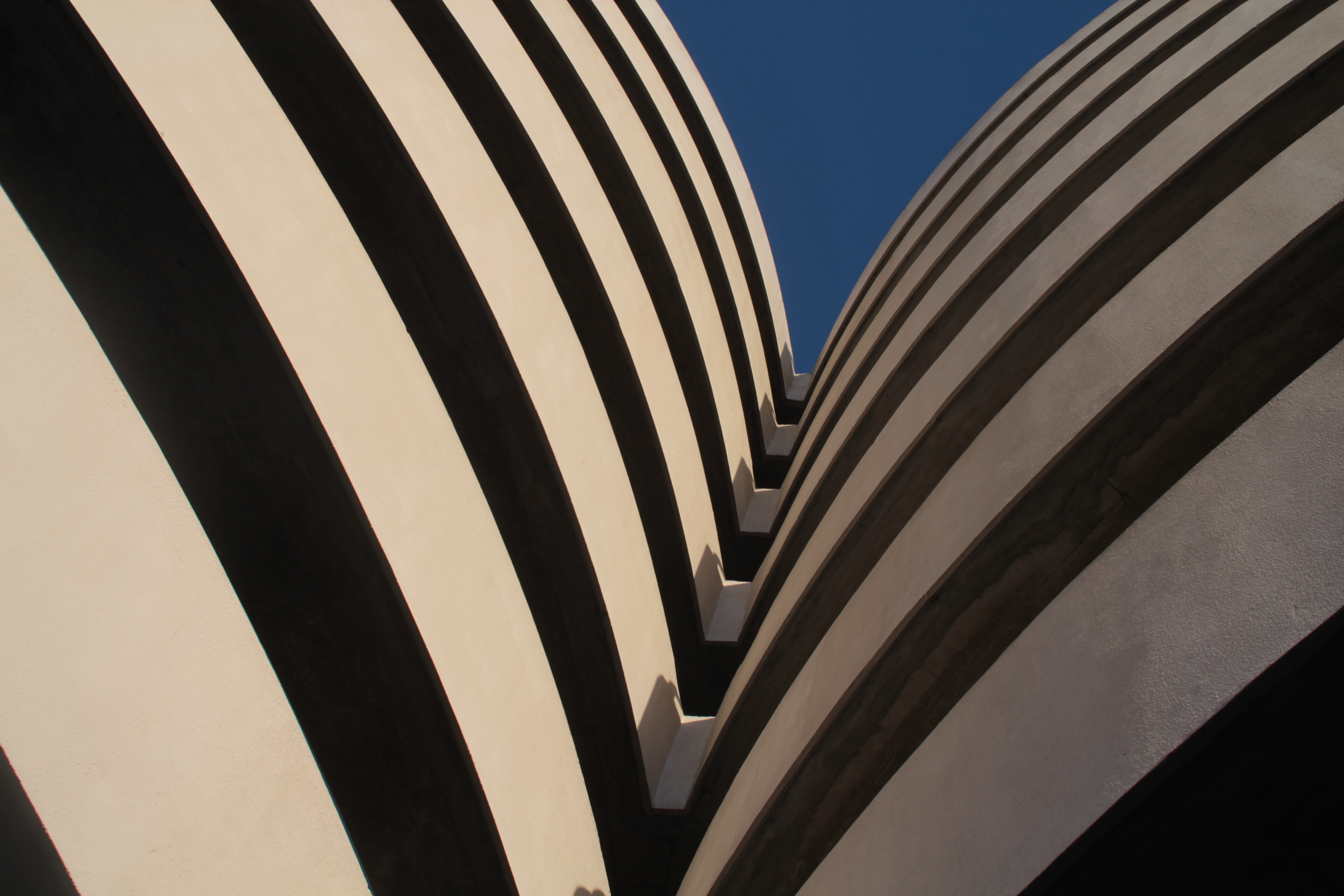
Ramps, Europarking

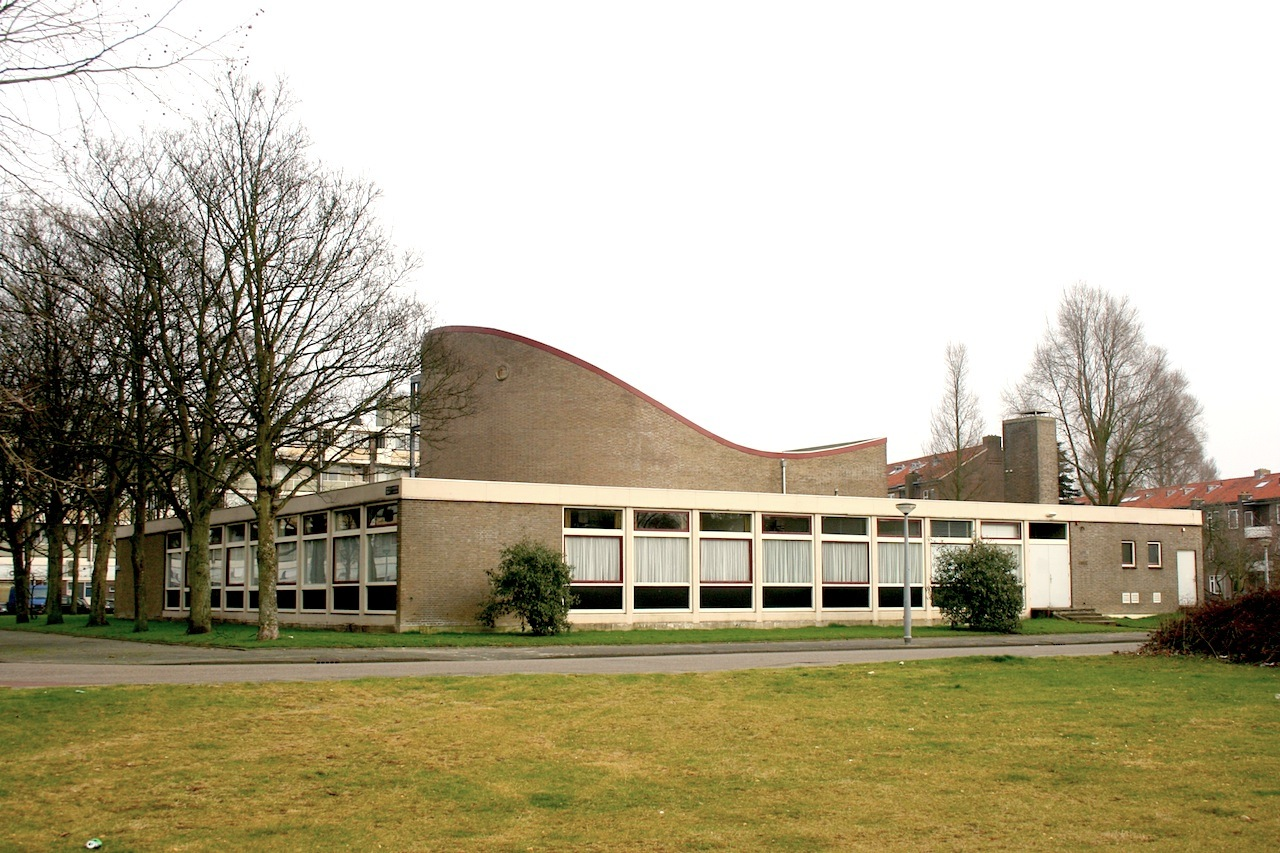
Hervormde Kerk De Ark, Slotervaart, Amsterdam Nieuw-West
