= Gratama =

Gratama is a surname of Dutch origin. Notable people with the surname are as follows:

- Gerrit David Gratama (1874–1965), Dutch artist and writer
- Jan Gratama (1877–1947), Dutch architect
- Lina Gratama (1875–1946), Dutch painter, art historian, and political activist
