= Henricus Petrus Baard =

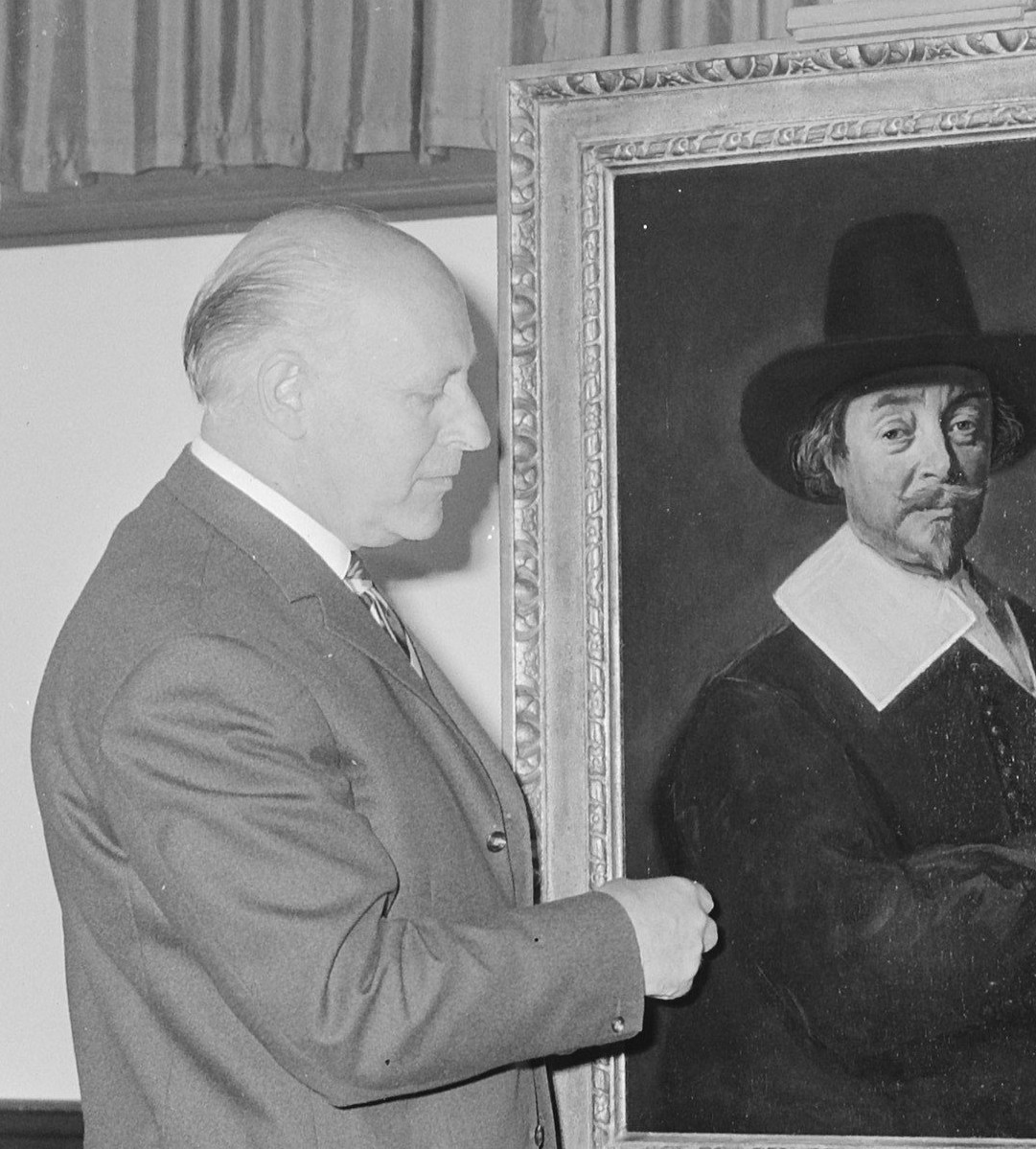
H.P. Baard in 1964

Henricus Petrus Baard (1906 – 2000), was director of the Frans Hals Museum from 1946-1972.

== Biography ==
He was born in Amsterdam as the son of Cornelis W.H. Baard, the director of the Stedelijk Museum, and though his father wished he would follow a career in the wood trade, he studied art history and accepted a job as a volunteer with the Rijksmuseum. In 1932 he was appointed scientific assistant of history there and as of 1939 he was put in charge of the art collection. When he succeeded Gerrit David Gratama as director of the Frans Hals Museum, he moved to the upper floor of the Jacobus van Looy house, where he stayed until it was sold in 1967. In the Frans Hals Museum he removed most of the paintings from the display rooms, firmly believing that visitors could better concentrate on fewer works rather than ambling aimlessly room in, room out, attempting to absorb an entire collection in one visit. He felt that a good museum visit should not last more than one hour. From 1953 he introduced "candlelight" evening opening hours that were popular until they were discontinued in 1971. He organized seminars and ordered the creation of a scientific catalog of all the works in the museum, which his scientific assistant Carla van Hees began but which had still not been finished by the time he died. In 1959 he moved all of the Haarlem schutterstukken to the new annex in the back of the building, where they could all be seen together. They still hang there.

In 1943 Baard acted als guardian of the Muiderslot while being head of the Rijksmuseum's historical department. Under his supervision the museumization of the castle received a new impulse. His main achievement was the great international Frans Hals exhibition in 1962 and the scientific catalog that he published with it, that had contributions by Carla van Hees and the young Seymour Slive. Many distinguished visitors came to Haarlem for the show and he received and showed them around them personally. The show made 750,000 guilders for the city of Haarlem, and though he desired to purchase a 17th-century painting with the funds, the money was used instead to fund young artists in the Ateliers '63.

According to the RKD he was scientific assistant at the Rijksmuseum 1935-1945 and from 1946-1972 he became museum director in Haarlem and is known for his research books on art history. He managed the evacuation of the important artworks during the war to bunkers in the dunes. He died in Haarlem.

== Publications ==
- Frans Hals Exhibition catalog, 1962 for the Frans Hals Museum, title : Exhibition on the Occasion of the Centenary of the Municipal Museum at Haarlem, 1862-1962, exhibition committee: H.P. Baard, Seymour Slive, A.B. de Vries, painting descriptions by Carla van Hees.
- Hals. The Library of Great Painters (1981). Harry N. Abrams, Inc., Publisher. New York, N.Y., 167 pp. ISBN 0-8109-1055-1
