= Gerrit Versteeg (urban architect) =

Dutch urban architect

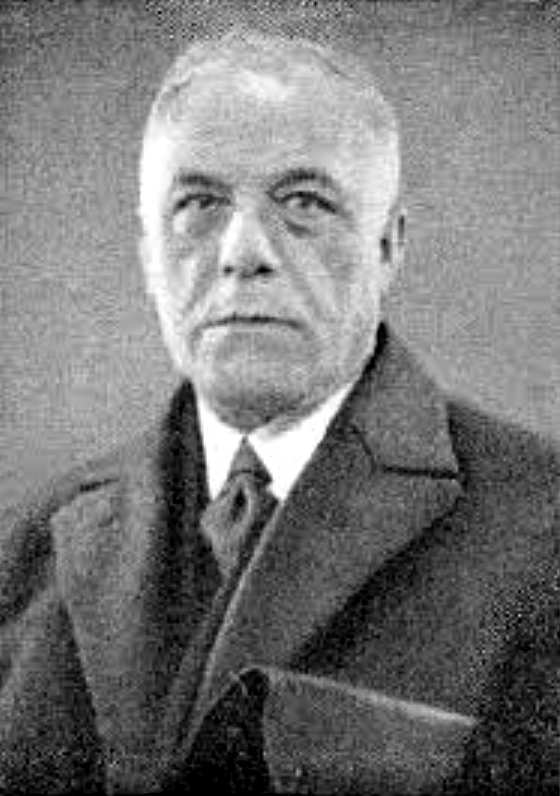
Gerrit Versteeg

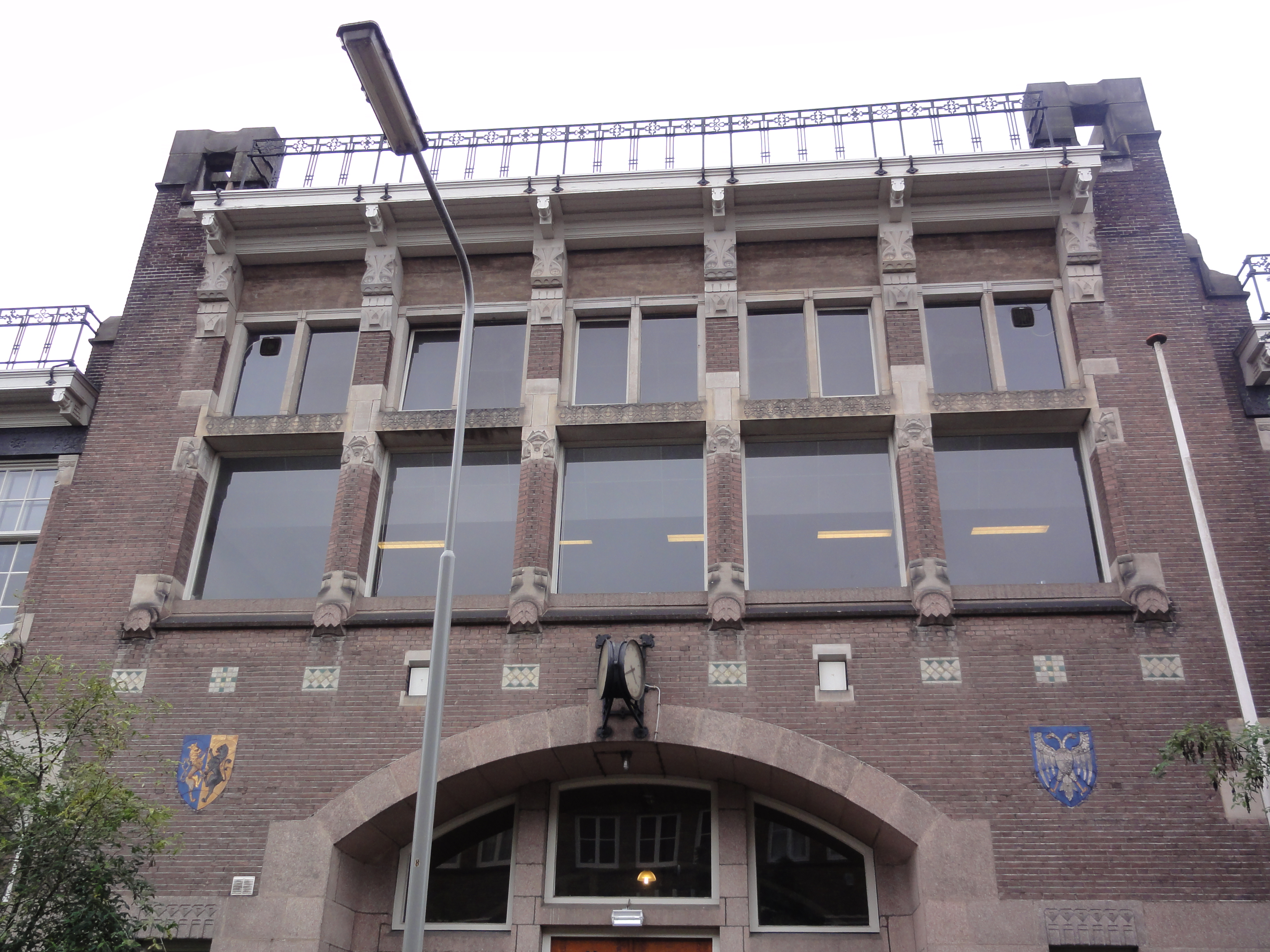
Lorentz H.B.S. in Arnhem.

Gerrit Versteeg (Vlaardingen, 2 August 1872 – Arnhem, 1938) was a Dutch urban architect.

== Biography ==
Versteeg was a son of Simon Versteeg and Alida Cornelia van der Kaaden, and grew up in Vlaardingen. His father was a farmer. In 1900, Gerrit married Hendrika Aleida Costerus. Versteeg studied in Delft for carpenter, and started his career at an architectural firm. Also he was assistant to Karel Sluijterman and to Eugen Gugel for some time.

Between 1901 and 1914 he was Deputy Director of Public Works in Arnhem, under the director W.F.C. Sheep. Mr. Sheep was focused on urban design, and Versteeg was designed buildings. In this period many schools and commercial buildings were built, such as the tram depot, the slaughterhouse, the power plant and vegetable auction.

Versteeg then moved to Amsterdam, where in 1914 he started working together with the architect Jan Gratama. Together they focused on housing design. Among others they directed the realisation of the urban plan for Betondorp. They are also known by designing since 1916 many transformer houses for the electricity company PGEM (Provincial Geldersche Electriciteits Maatschappij).

From 1930 until his death Versteeg was working together with his eldest son Gerrit Versteeg jr.

He died in 1938 and was buried in Zorgvlied.

== Work ==
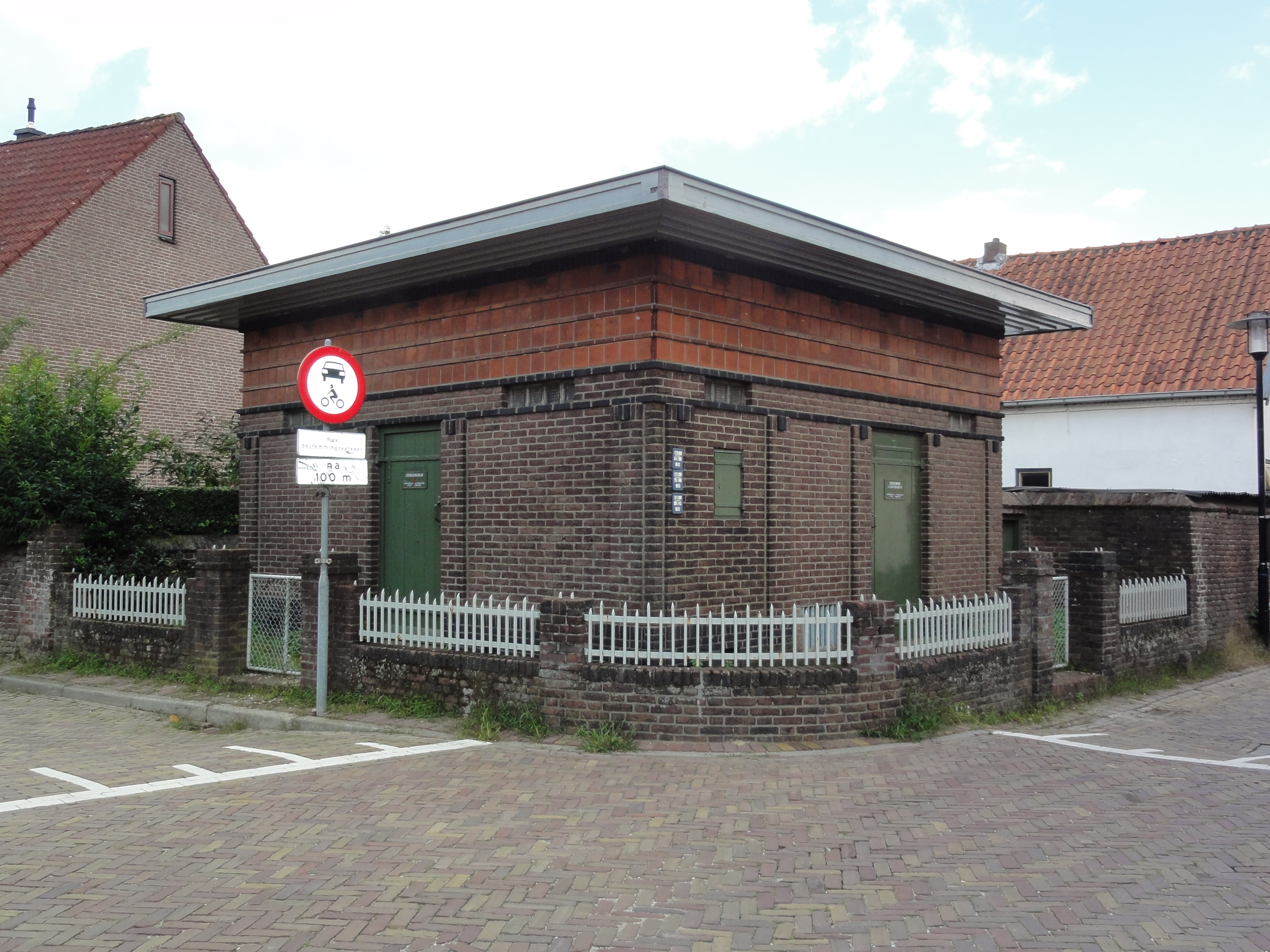
Transformer house in Druten

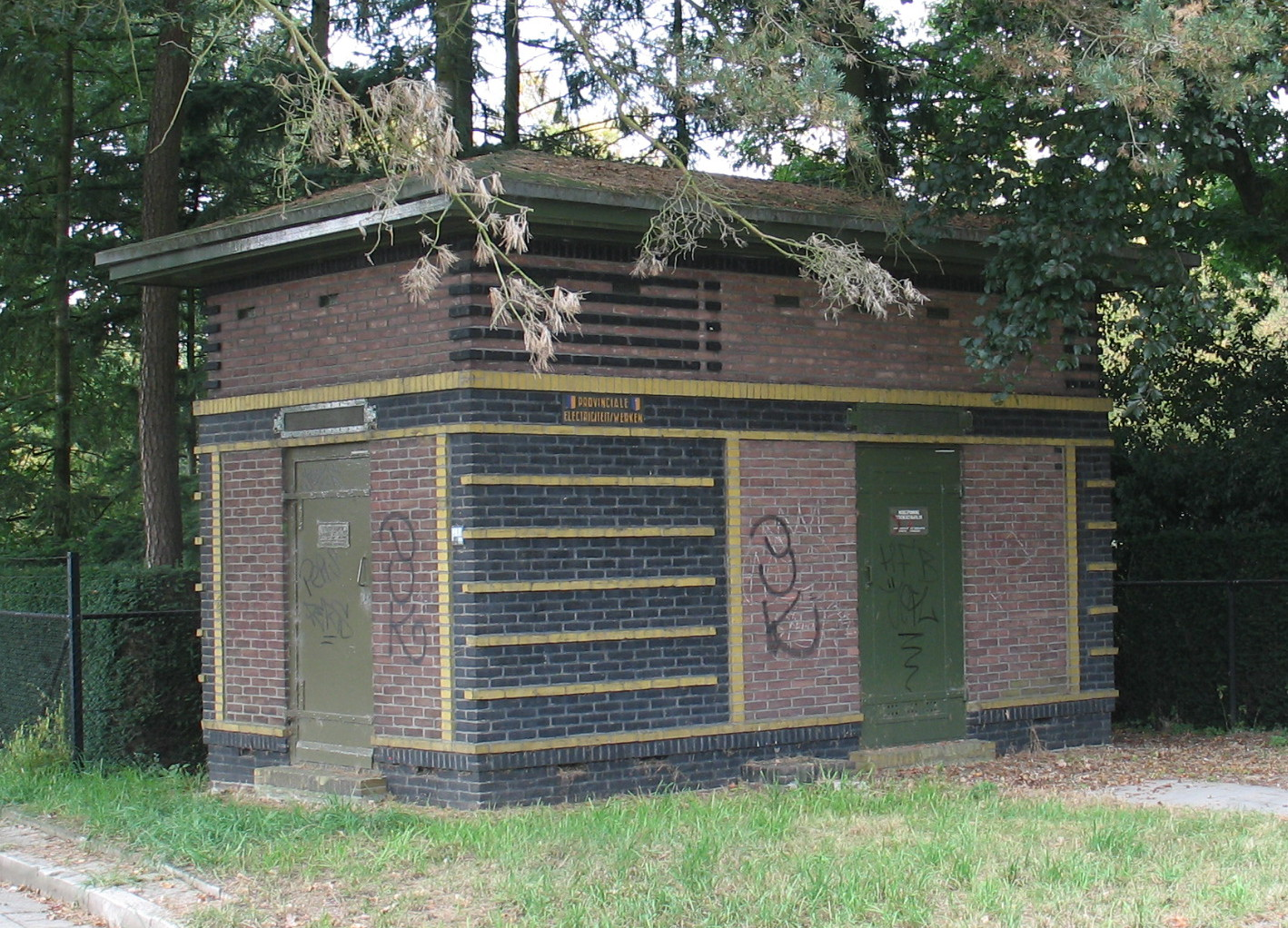
Transformer house in Ede

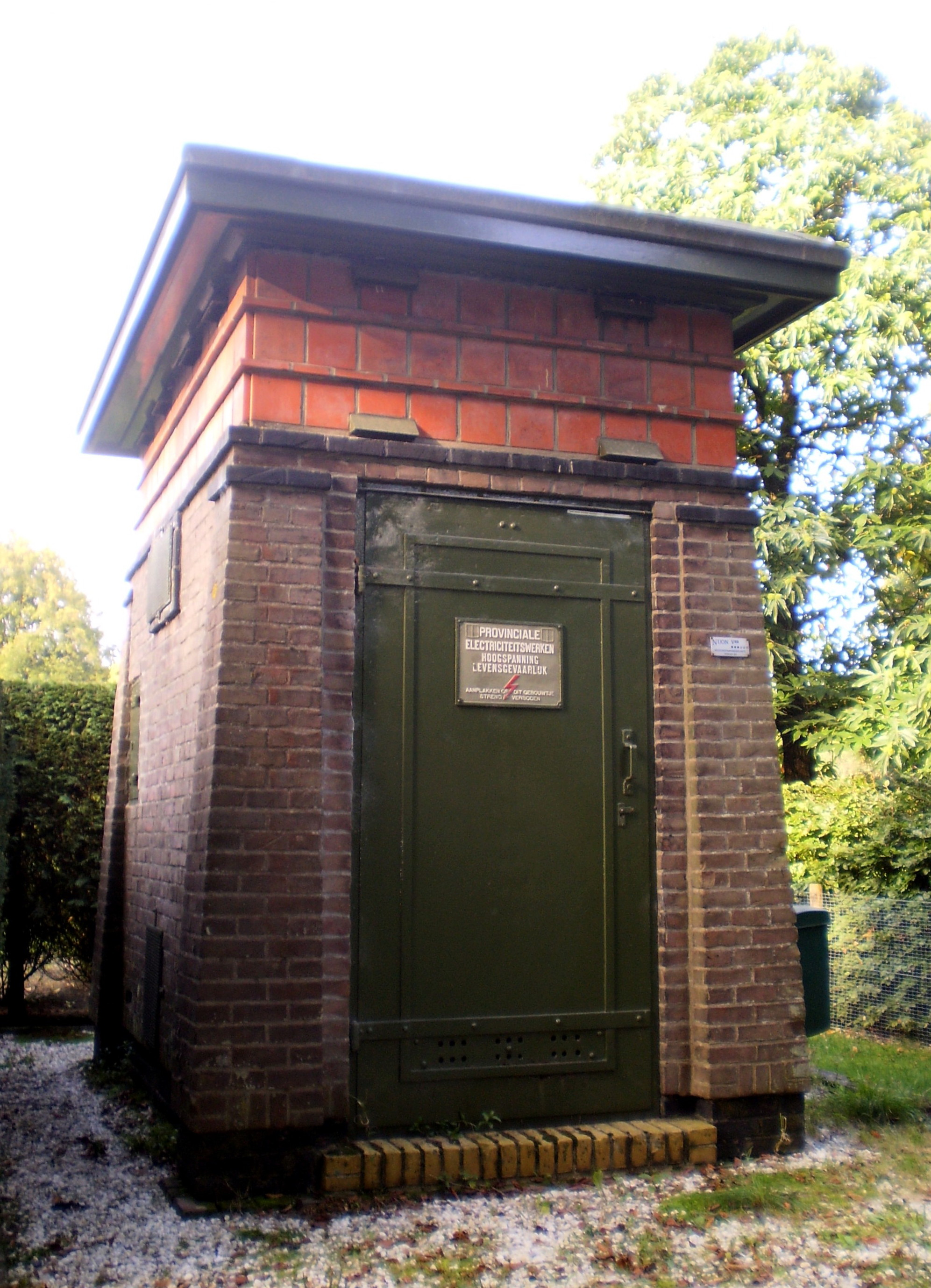
Transformer house in Hoog Soeren
