= Karel Sluijterman =

Dutch architect (1863–1931)

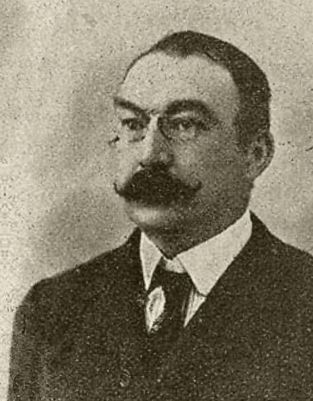
Sluyterman in 1902

Theodorus Karel Lodewijk Sluijterman (22 January 1863 – 8 June 1931) was a Dutch architect, furniture designer, interior designer, illustrator, ceramist, book binding designer, and professor.

== Life and work ==
Sluijterman was born on 22 January 1863, in Engelen. From 1880 to 1884, he studied at the Polytechnic School in Delft (the future Delft University of Technology) under the designer Adolf le Comte and at the Academy of Fine and Applied Courses in Rotterdam.

From 1888 to 1891, Sluijterman worked in Paris at the Franco-Dutch architect-decorator Eduard Johan Niermans (1859-1928), where he got acquainted with the French floral Art Nouveau. This new style would greatly influence his work, though not all of his designs can be rank under the art nouveau. He also worked in the popular nineteenth-century revival styles.

Back in the Netherlands, Sluyterman was first aesthetic consultant and designer in 't Interior, a company for interior design founded by the innovative architect Hendrik Petrus Berlage.

In 1895, Sluyterman became a Professor at the Polytechnic School in Delft, where he taught decorative art and theory of ornaments. In 1901 Sluyterman became teacher ornament drawing at the School of Applied Arts in Haarlem. In these capacities he actively worked to spread the applied arts.

In 1900, Sluijterman creates with the architect Johan Mutters the Dutch pavilion in the Art Nouveau style for the Universal Exhibition of 1900 in Paris.

Back home the Amsterdam, jeweler and goldsmith William Hoeker, founder of the Amsterdam interior design firm The Interior, hired Sluijterman as aesthetic consultant and designer. One of his assistants was Gerrit Versteeg. He died on 8 June 1931, aged 68, in The Hague.

== Gallery ==
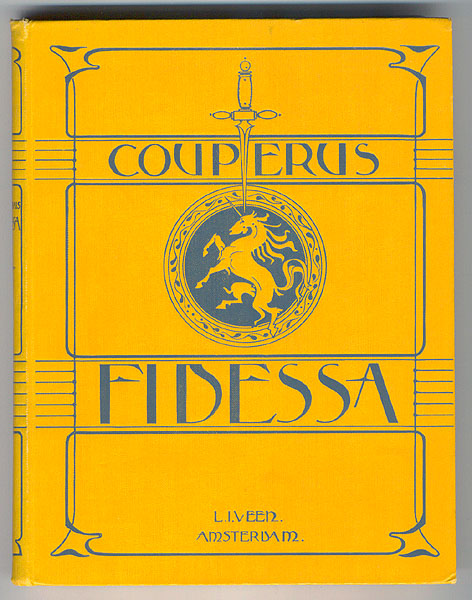
Book cover Fidessa by Louis Couperus

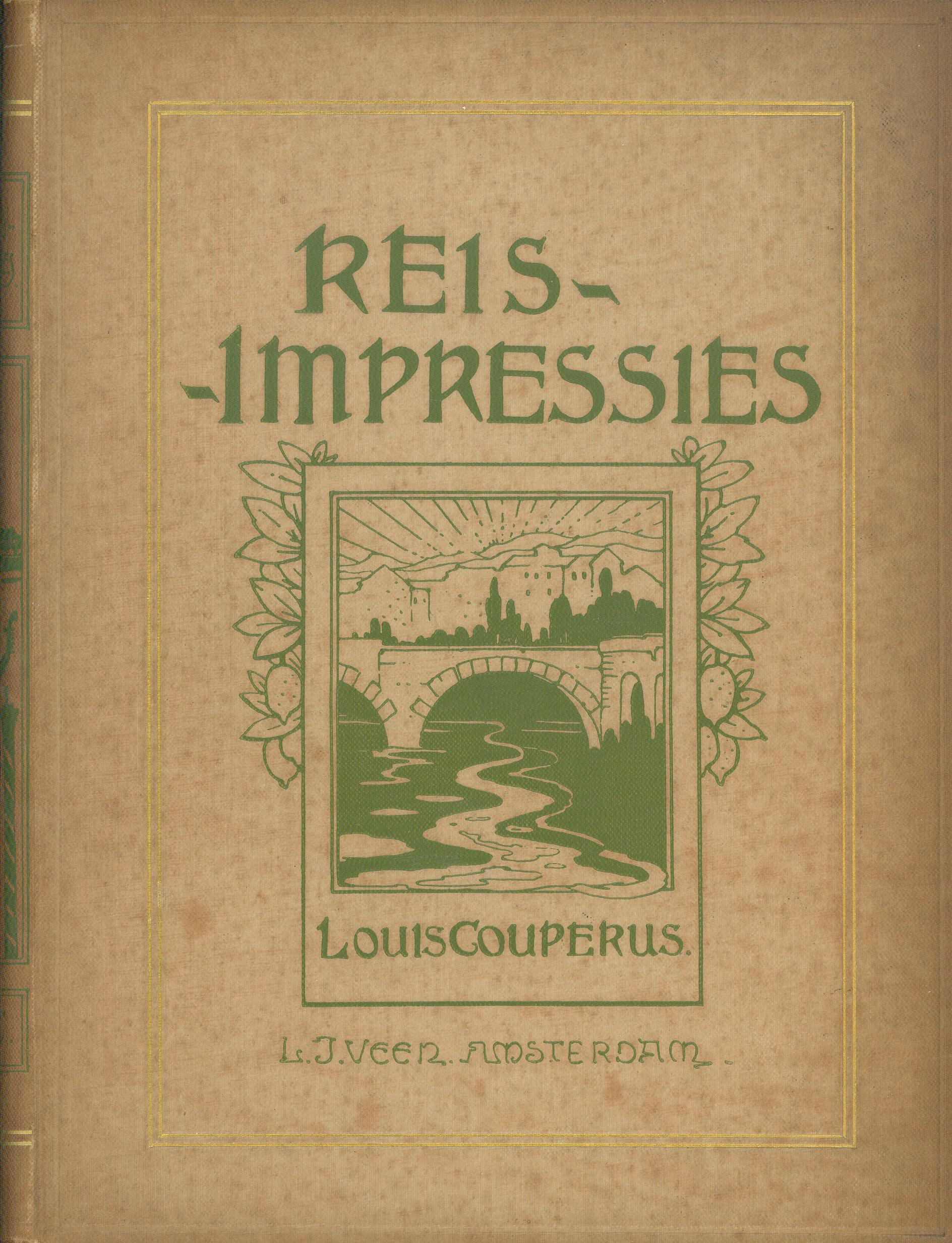
Book cover Reis-impressies by Louis Couperus

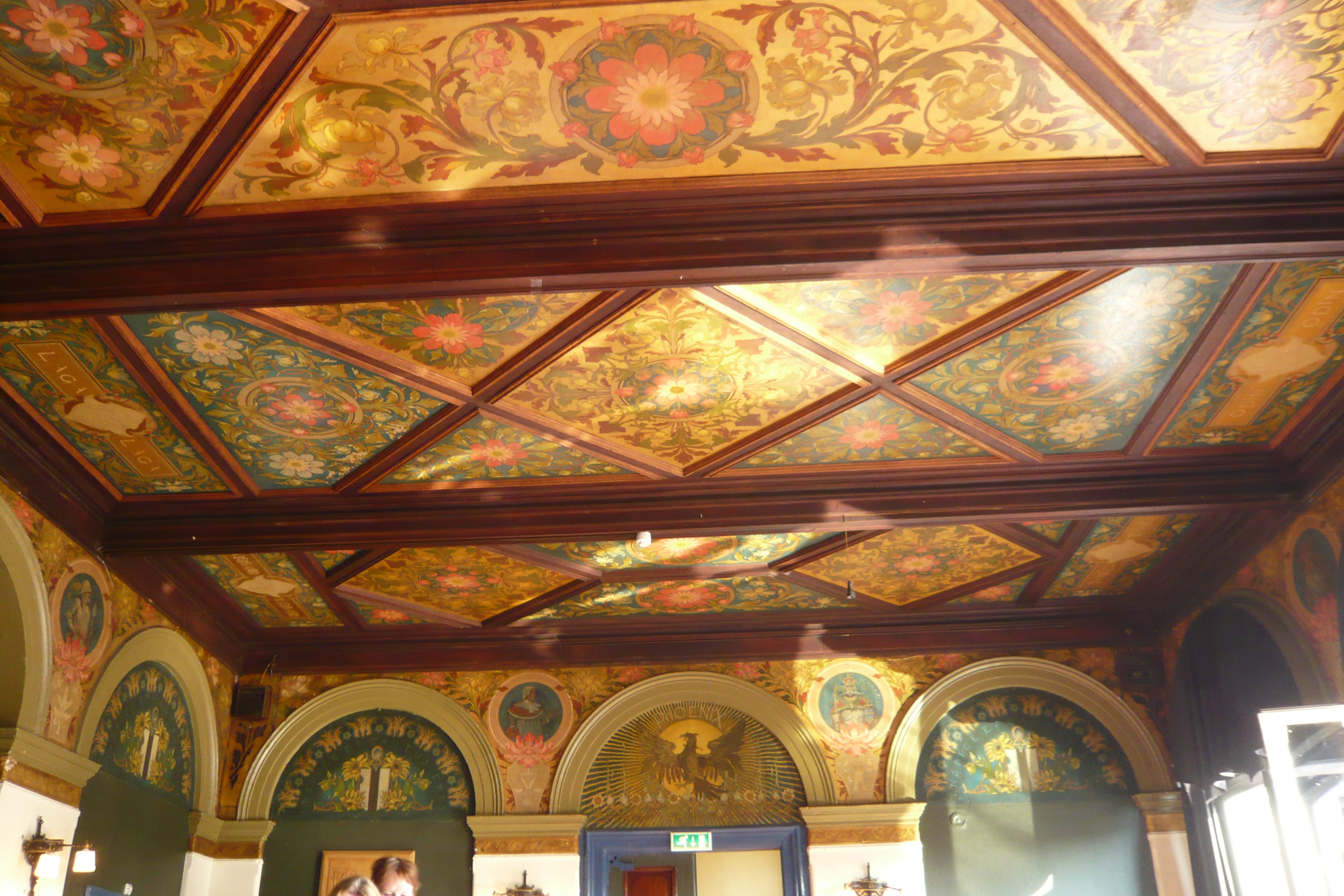
Ceiling paintings from design by Sluyterman

== See also ==
- List of Dutch ceramists
