= Jan Gratama =

Dutch architect (1877–1947)

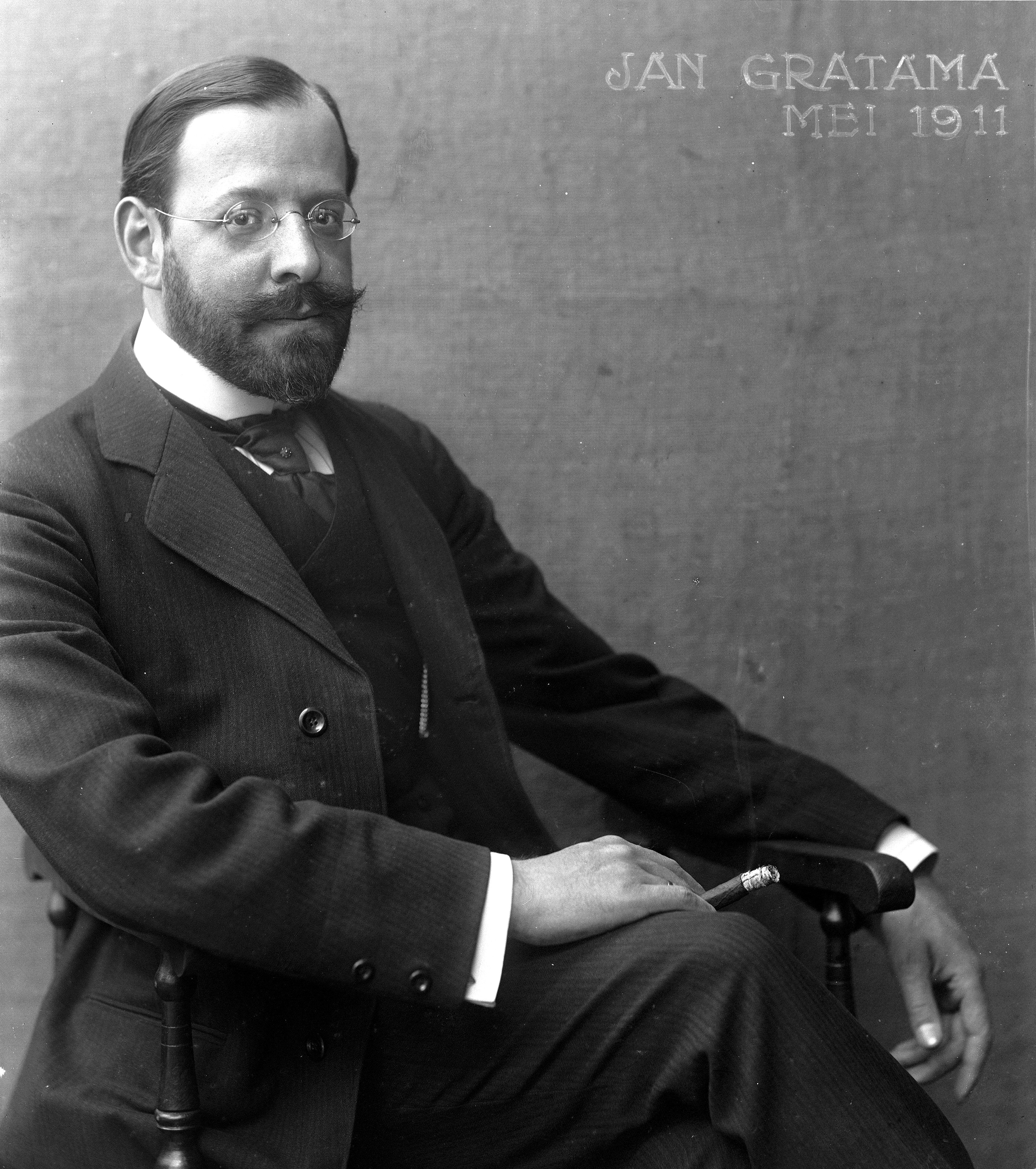
Jan Gratama (1911)

Jan Gratama (16 August 1877 – 12 December 1947), was a Dutch architect.

== Biography ==
He was born in Groningen and was the younger brother of the artist and museum director Gerrit David Gratama. His sister Lina Gratama (1875–1946) was a painter He studied at the Polytechnical School of Delft and became an amateur portrait artist like his older brother. He was an artistic advisor to his sister Lina, who also became a portrait artist, and became known for her copies of the works in the Mauritshuis and the Gemeentemuseum Den Haag.

In 1908 he established an architecture bureau in Amsterdam, where he worked with Berlage and others in the style of the Amsterdam School. His partners in his architect bureau were Gerrit Versteeg from 1914 and Jan Willem Dinger from 1930, who continued the bureau after Gratama died in 1947.

== Works in Amsterdam ==
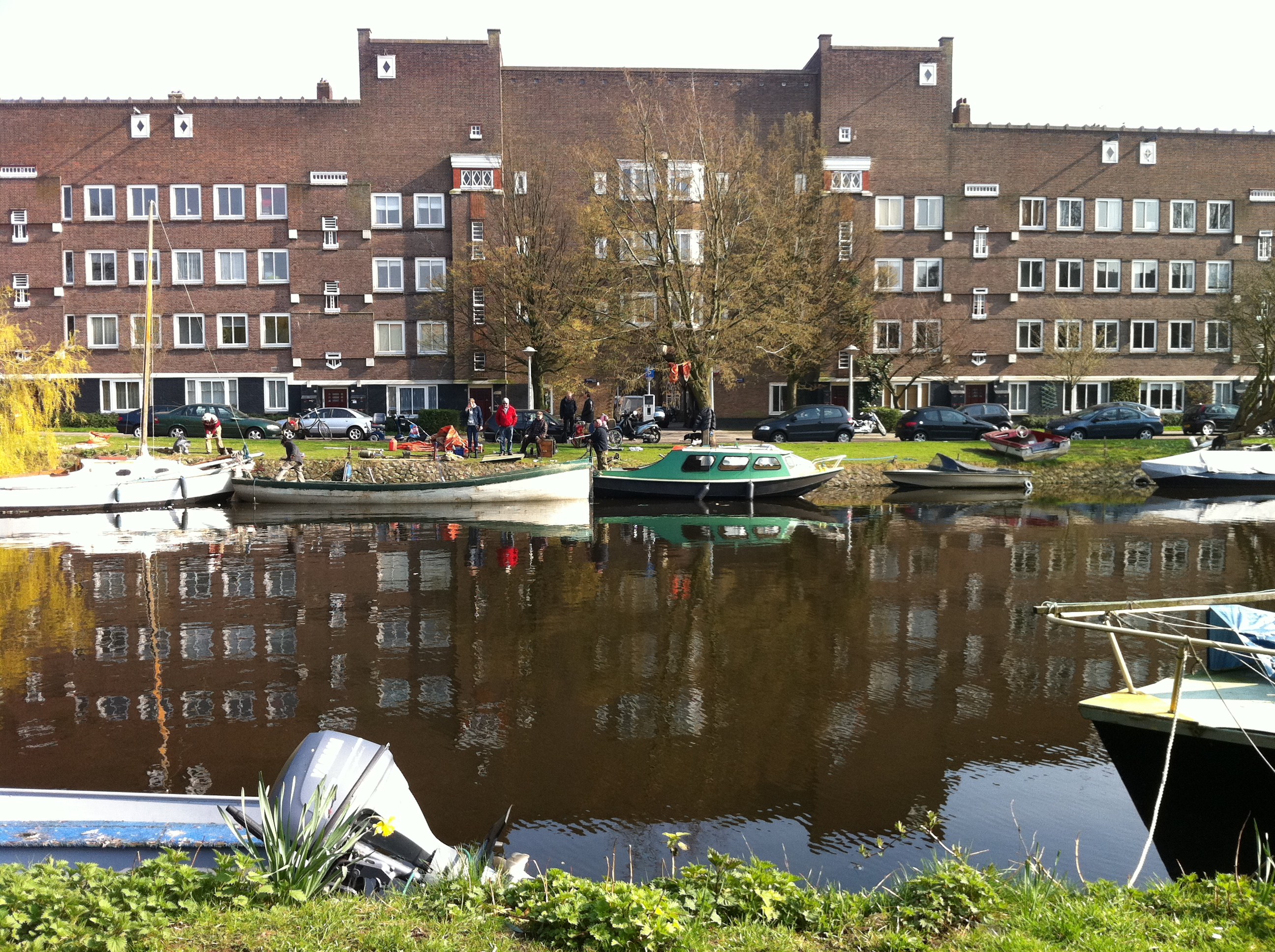
Olympia-complex, 1924

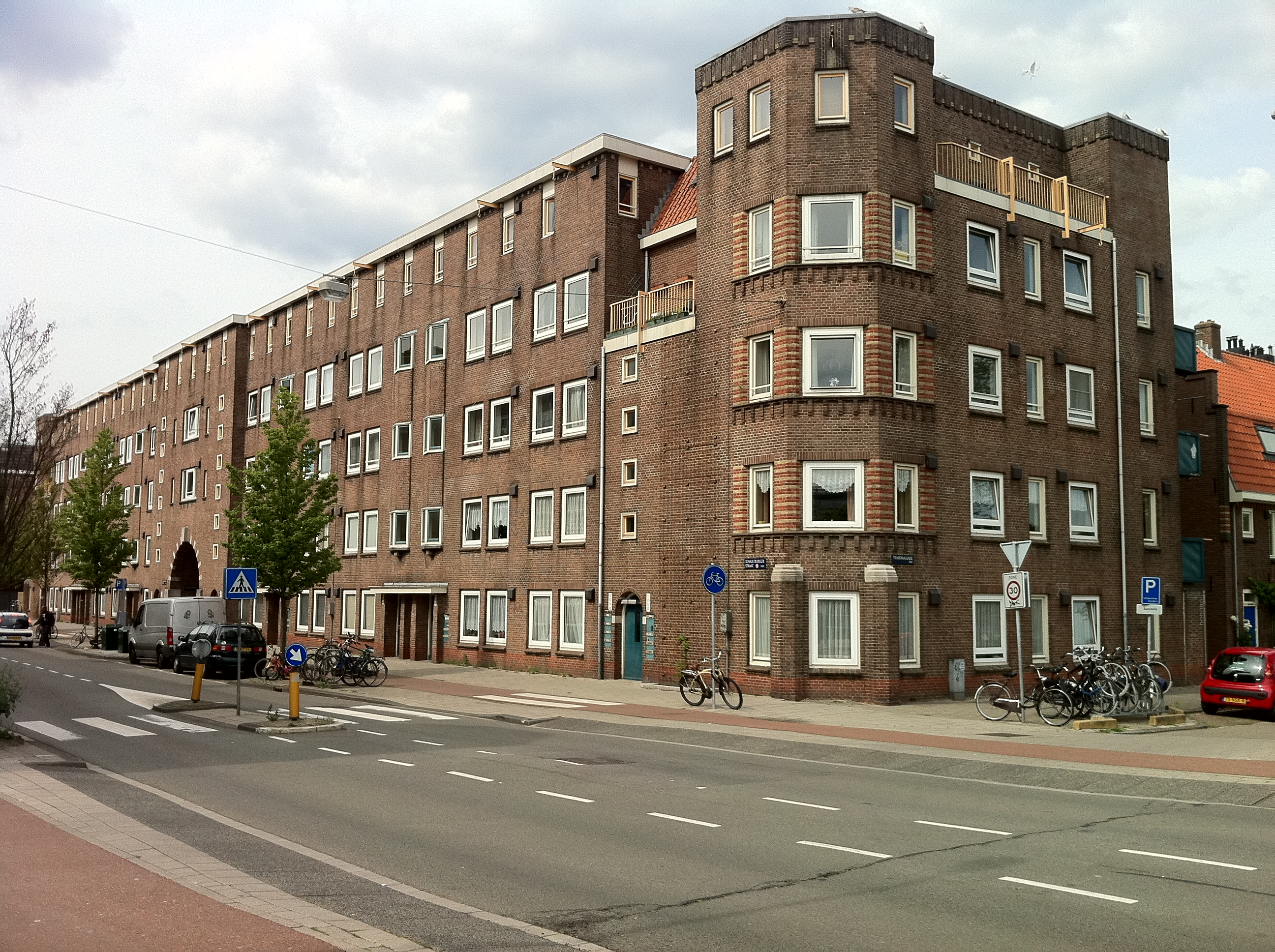
Transvaalkade (subsidized housing), 1920s

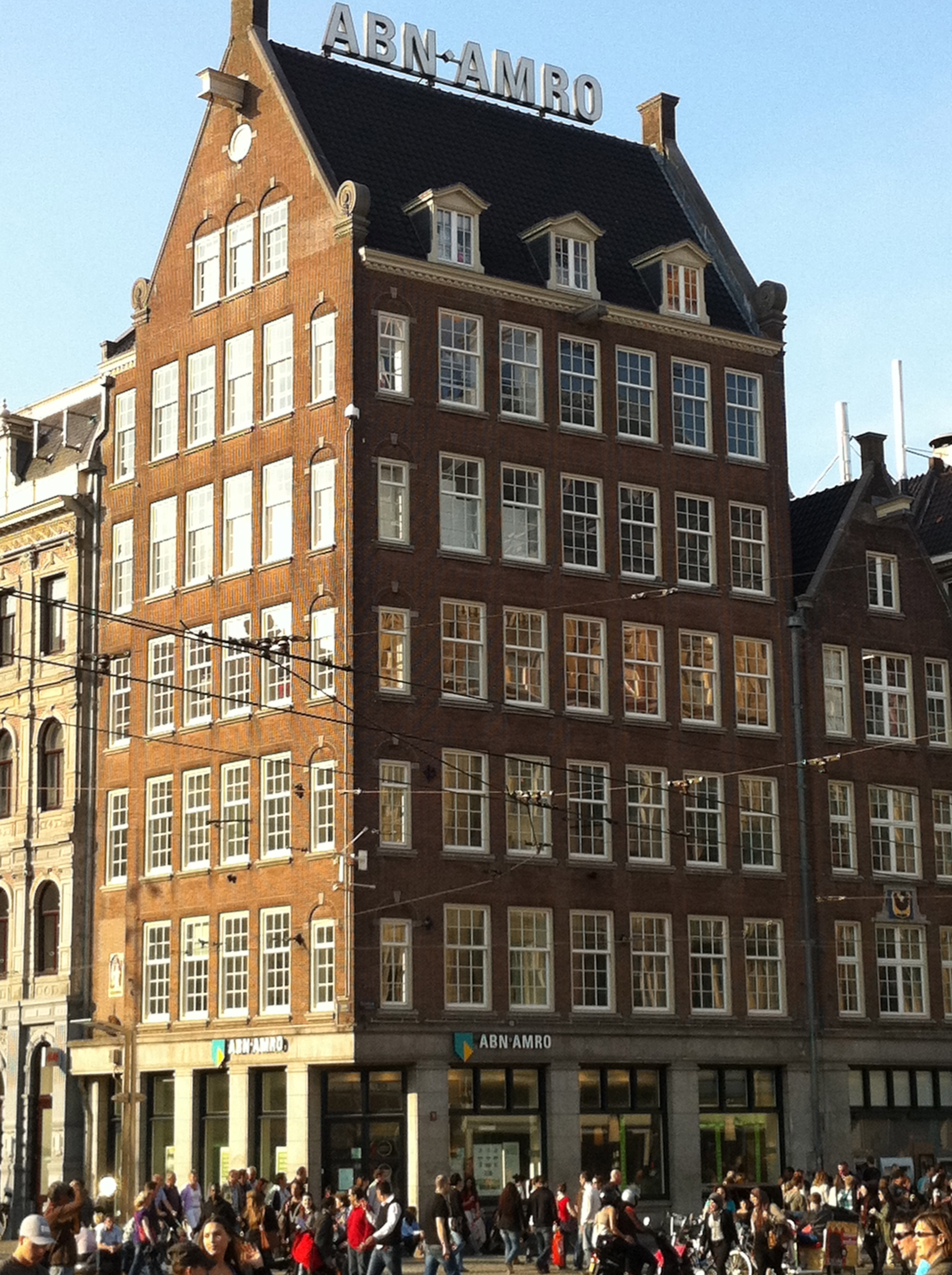
Office building De Bisschop, corner of the Dam and Damrak in Amsterdam. It was built in 1934 for the Incasso Bank (later integrated into AMRO Bank).
