= Lina Gratama =

Dutch artist, historian and activist (1875–1946)

- Born: Petronella Johanna Carolina Gratama; 19 March 1875; Groningen, Netherlands
- Died: 12 June 1946 (aged 71); The Hague, Netherlands
- Known for: Painting

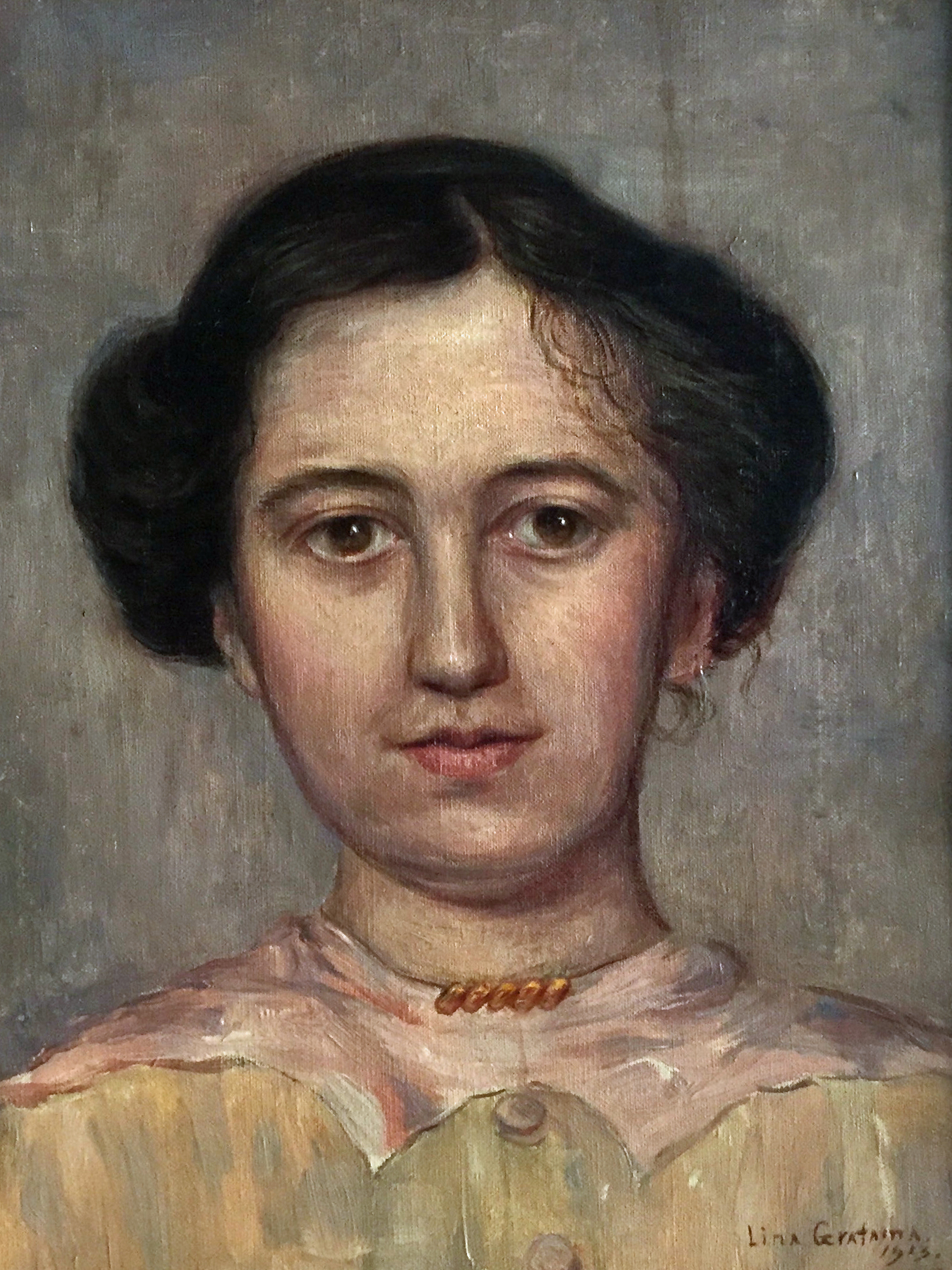
Portrait of a young woman, 1913

Petronella Johanna Carolina "Lina" Gratama (1875–1946) was a Dutch painter, art historian, and political activist.

== Biography ==
Gratama was born on 19 March 1875 in Groningen. She is the sister of the architect Jan Gratama and the painter Gerrit David Gratama. Lina studied at Akademie van beeldende kunsten (Den Haag) (Royal Academy of Art, The Hague), graduating in 1900.

Gratama died on 12 June 1946 in The Hague.

== Work ==
Gratama was famous for producing copies of paintings of museums, including the Mauritshuis and Gemeetemuseum. Her work appeared in exhibitions in 1903, 1912, 1924 and 1935. Gratama's work was also included in the 1939 exhibition and sale Onze Kunst van Heden (Our Art of Today) at the Rijksmuseum in Amsterdam. She also taught art history and gave private art lessons.

She also fought for women's suffrage and wrote for political magazines, including poetry. She was the co-author with Cornelia Sarah Groot of the suffragette political revue Cackling Alone Does Not Lay Eggs (1916-1918), which encouraged further political action: "Keep the fire burning all the time / Until the emancipation of the woman." A book version of the performance was first published in 1916 and republished in 1917 and 1918.
