= Gerrit David Gratama =

Dutch painter

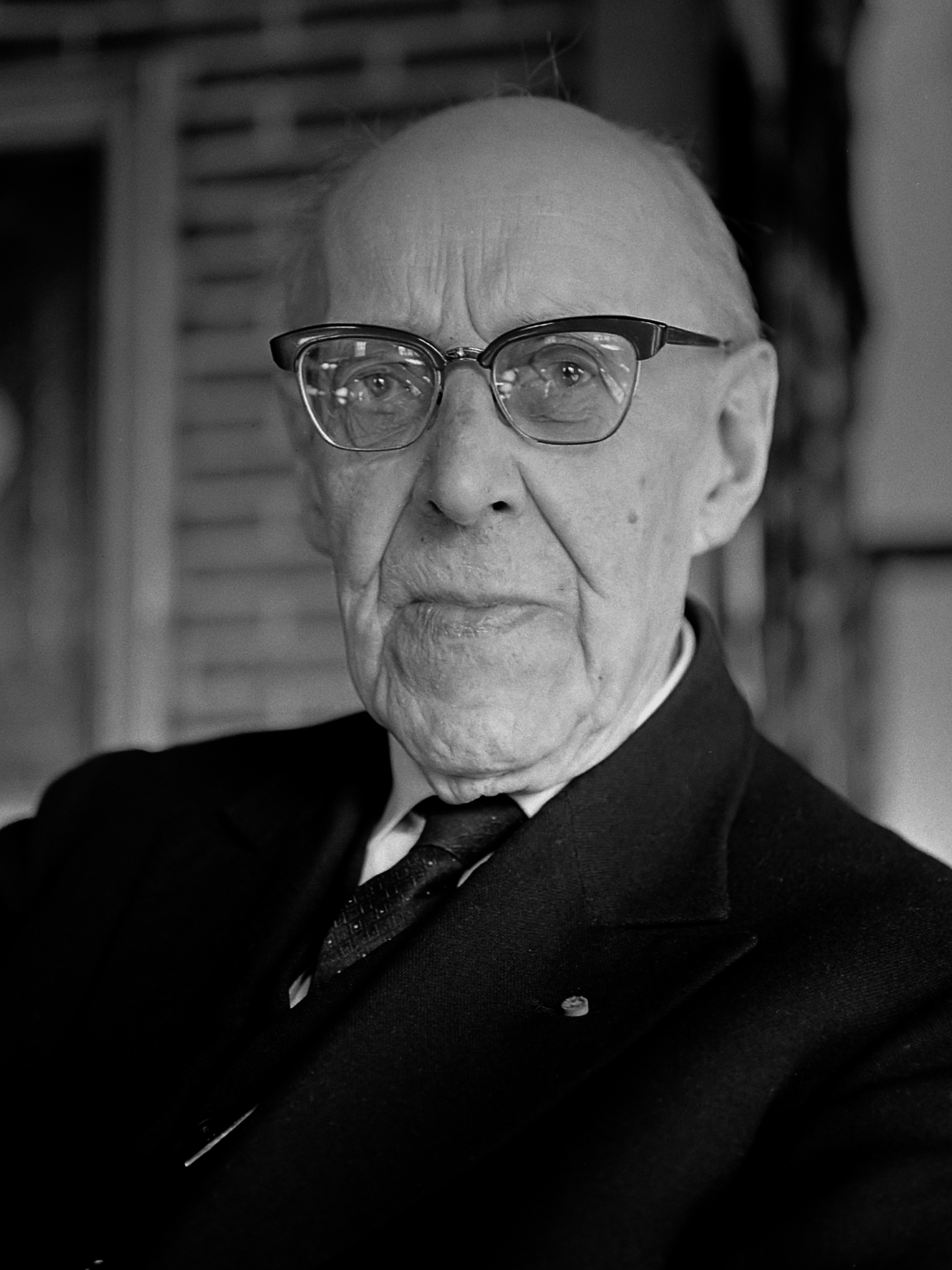
Gerrit David Gratama (1964)

Gerrit David Gratama (22 March 1874 – 20 August 1965), was a Dutch artist, writer, and director of the Frans Hals Museum.

== Biography ==
He was born in Groningen and was the brother of the architect Jan Gratama and painter Lina Gratama (1875-1946). He studied at the Hague Academy of art during the years 1892-1895, and afterwards during the years 1895-1897 he continued his studies at the Royal academy of art in Antwerp. He was a pupil in Antwerp of Albrecht De Vriendt and Henri Heymans and a friend of Hendrik van Borssum Buisman, Simon Maris, Toon Dupuis, Isidoor Opsomer, Walter Vaes and H.J. Wouter. In 1912 he was appointed director of the Frans Hals Museum, which meant that he oversaw the complete renovation of the former Oude Mannenhuis and the move of the collection from the upper floors of the City Hall. Among his tasks were organizing exhibitions and keeping the museum catalog up-to-date, and for his 25th anniversary as director, he organized a Frans Hals monograph exhibition to celebrate the 75th birthday of the Haarlem municipal museum and wrote the Frans Hals Exhibition catalog in 1937 together with J.L.A.A.M. van Rijckevoorsel.

Gratama's work was included in the 1939 exhibition and sale Onze Kunst van Heden (Our Art of Today) at the Rijksmuseum in Amsterdam.

He was hired not only as a curator and director, but was also artist-in-residence at the museum and kept a studio there. He was known for his portraits and still-life paintings. He retired officially in 1940, but was asked to stay on during the war and oversaw the storage of the collection highlights in the dunes. He did retire after 33 years in 1946, but he continued as a painter into old age. He was succeeded as director of the museum by Henricus Petrus Baard. He died in Haarlem.
