= Willem Hekking (1825–1904) =

Dutch lithographer (1825–1904)

Willem Hekking Jr.
- Born: 22 February 1825; Amsterdam
- Died: 11 January 1904 (aged 78); Amsterdam
- Education: Pupil of Willem Hekking Sr.

Willem Hekking (22 February 1825 – 11 January 1904), also known as Willem Hekking Jr. or Willem Hekking (II), was a Dutch lithographer, draughtsman, watercolourist and painter.

== Life ==
Hekking was born and died in Amsterdam. He was a son and pupil of the painter Willem Hekking Sr. He was active as an artist from about 1840 to 1904, and worked in Amsterdam from 1845 to 1904.

He was employed by Artis zoo and provided illustrations for several books about it. As custos (keeper) of the Ethnographic Museum of Artis, he looked after the collection and the arrangement of the museum's rooms.

== Work ==
Buitenaanzicht van de koepel van het Paleis voor Volksvlijt (Exterior of the dome of the Paleis voor Volksvlijt), 1864, colour lithograph. Amsterdam City Archives

Hekking mainly made pen drawings and lithographs, and also painted townscapes and river views. His subjects also included landscapes, church interiors and still lifes with fruit or game.

He exhibited in Amsterdam from 1842 to 1865, as well as in Groningen in 1845, Kampen in 1852, Leeuwarden in 1853 and Haarlem in 1879. Besides townscapes, church interiors and river views, he also showed a flower and fruit piece and small flower pieces there. At the 1842 Exhibition of Living Masters in Amsterdam he was represented by a drawn townscape after C. Springer. He also sent work to the exhibitions of living masters in Nijmegen in 1846 and in Groningen in 1849.

When the Paleis voor Volksvlijt opened in 1864, a series of prints appeared with twelve interior and exterior views of the building, together with a floor plan and an accompanying text by Pieter Harmen Witkamp. Hekking made at least one preparatory drawing for it, signed and in pen and brush, which in 2026 was on loan from the Koninklijk Oudheidkundig Genootschap to the Rijksmuseum. After a drawing by F. Weissenbruch he made a wood engraving of the Martinikerk in Sneek, which in 2026 was in the collection of the Fries Scheepvaart Museum.

In 1980 Amsterdam honderd jaar geleden (Amsterdam a hundred years ago) was published in Groningen, with thirty images after his lithographs; the original edition had appeared in 1862 by G.W. Tielkemeijer in Amsterdam.

In 1981 the Amsterdams Historisch Museum held drawings by him of the Fransepad in Amsterdam, originally from the Splitgerber collection of Museum Fodor; the Amsterdam municipal archives held a watercolour of the Old Lutheran Church; and the municipal archives of Haarlem held several drawings.

== Gallery ==
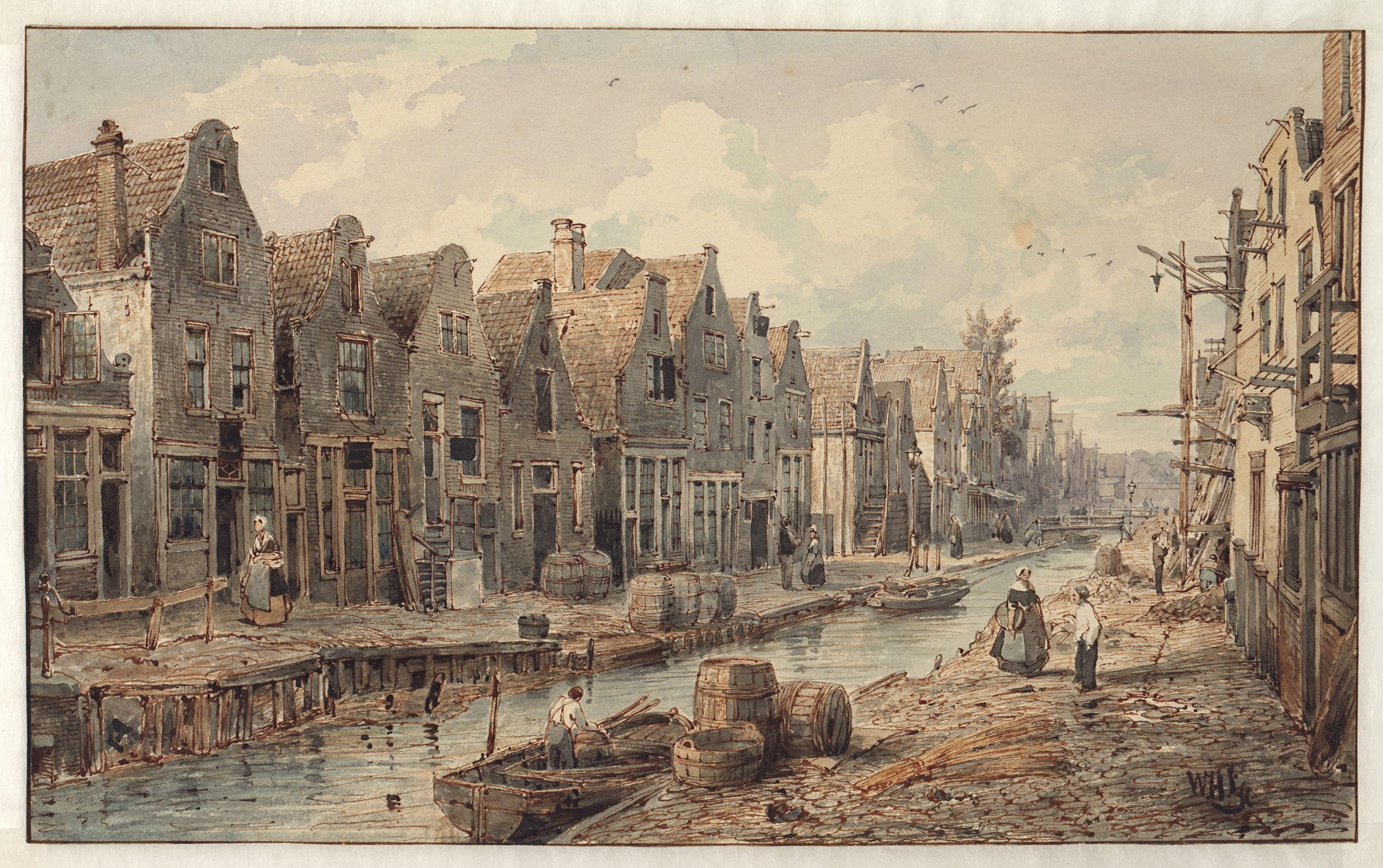
Goudsbloemgracht gezien vanaf de Lijnbaansgracht (Goudsbloemgracht seen from the Lijnbaansgracht), c. 1850. Amsterdam City Archives

De Dam te Amsterdam, op den avond van den 16den November 1863 (Dam Square in Amsterdam on the evening of 16 November 1863), 1863–1865, colour lithograph. Rijksmuseum

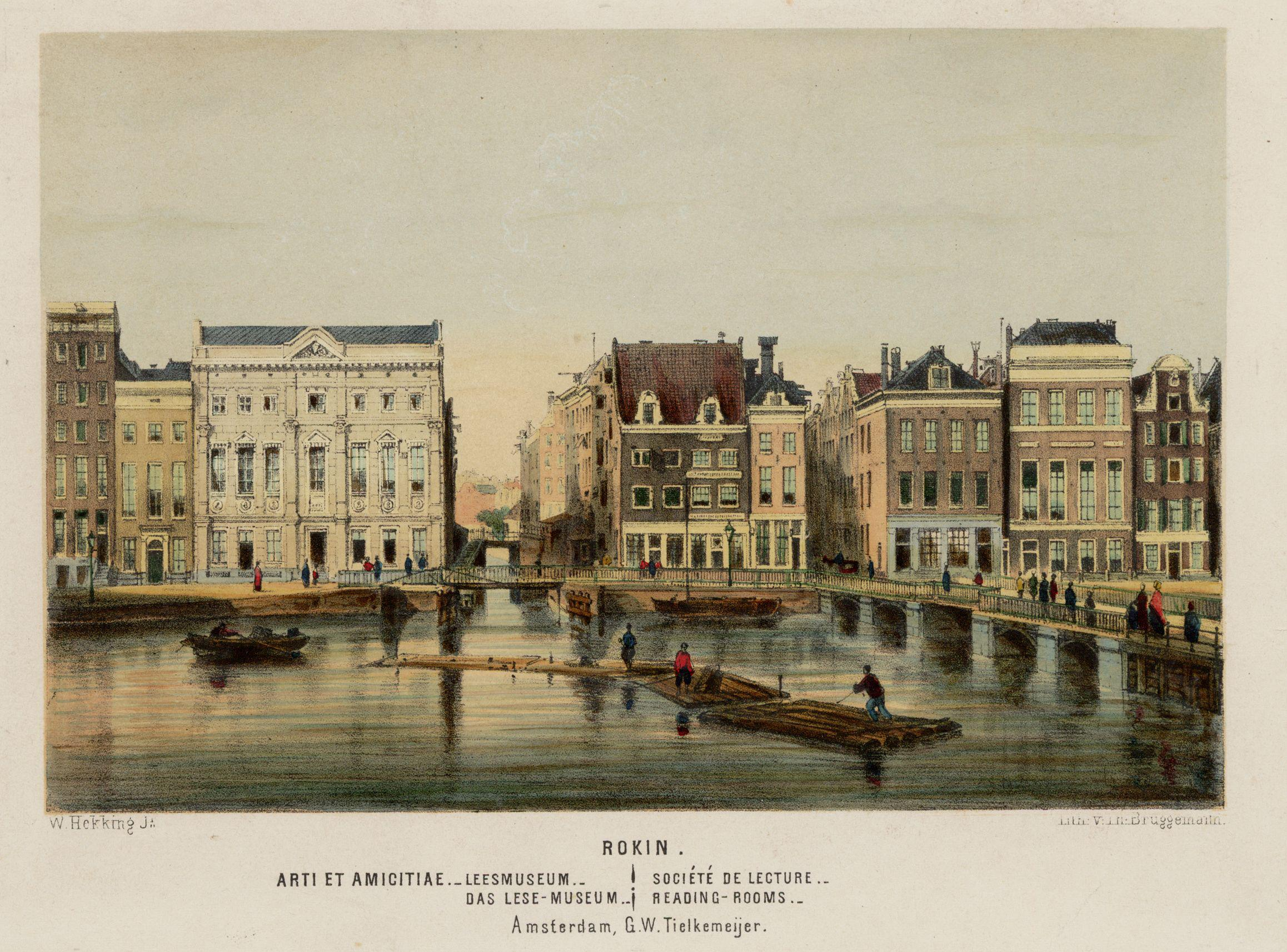
View of the Rokin in Amsterdam seen towards the Spui, 1855–1877, lithograph. Amsterdam City Archives

De Groenburgwal gezien naar Raamgracht en de Zuiderkerkstoren (The Groenburgwal looking towards the Raamgracht and the Zuiderkerk tower), c. 1861, lithograph. Amsterdam City Archives

De Heerengracht (The Herengracht canal), 1850, hand-coloured lithograph. Amsterdam City Archives
