= Anna Maria van Veeren =

Dutch painter (1806–1890)

- Born: 20 May 1806; Loenen aan de Vecht
- Died: 11 March 1890 (aged 83); Loenen aan de Vecht
- Education: Pupil of Willem Hekking and Hendrik Gerrit ten Cate

Anna Maria van Veeren (20 May 1806 – 11 March 1890) was a Dutch painter of still lifes. She was born and died in Loenen aan de Vecht.

== Life ==
Van Veeren lived in Loenen aan de Vecht and worked there from 1821 to 1890. She was a pupil of Willem Hekking and Hendrik Gerrit ten Cate, both painters in Amsterdam. In 1845 she became an honorary member of the Koninklijke Akademie van Beeldende Kunsten (Royal Academy of Fine Arts) in Amsterdam.

== Work ==
Van Veeren was an amateur painter and worked in oils. She painted still lifes of flowers and of fruit, as well as hunting still lifes showing dead game.

From 1834 to 1852 she exhibited flower and fruit pieces in Amsterdam. She was represented at the Exhibition of Living Masters in 1834, 1840, 1842, 1850 and 1852. By 1843 at the latest, she had also shown work at an exhibition in Arti et Amicitiae.

== Gallery ==
Still life with flowers and fruits, signed and dated 50 lower right

Study of flowers, fruit and walnut, attributed to Van Veeren

Study of fruit, flowers, walnut and rosehips, attributed to Van Veeren

Study of flowers, attributed to Van Veeren
