= Adrianus Eversen =

Dutch painter (1818–1897)

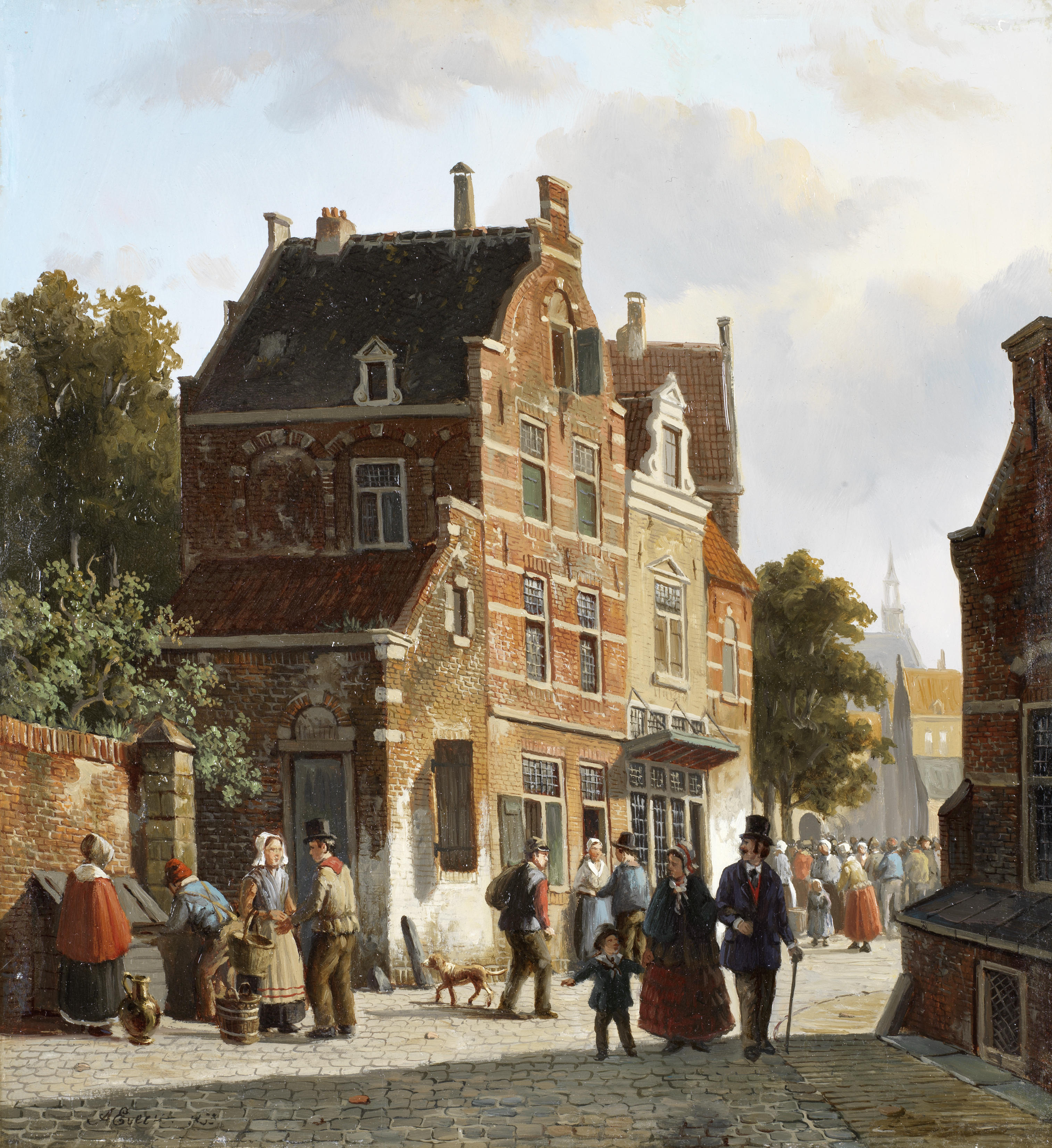
- Adrianus Eversen Figures in a busy street 1853
- Born: 13 January 1818; Amsterdam, United Kingdom of the Netherlands
- Died: 1 December 1897 (aged 79); Delft, Netherlands
- Known for: Painting, Paintings of cityscapes

Adrianus Eversen (13 January 1818 – 1 December 1897) was a Dutch painter.

== Biography ==
Adrianus Eversen portrayed the typical 19th century Dutch atmosphere in his work. As a member of Arti et Amicitiae he belonged to the society of elite artists of his time.

Eversen was a contemporary of Cornelis Springer. Both painters were students of Hendrik Gerrit ten Cate at the same time, and usually painted contemporary regional (Oud-Hollandse) cityscapes. In his choice of subjects, Eversen allowed himself more freedom. He painted mostly imaginary cityscapes, consisting of existing and invented fragments, unlike the more faithful representations of Springer.

The everyday life of people, Dutch architecture, and the illumination effect of sunlight played a major role in his work.

One of his descendants was the painter Johannes Hendrik Eversen.

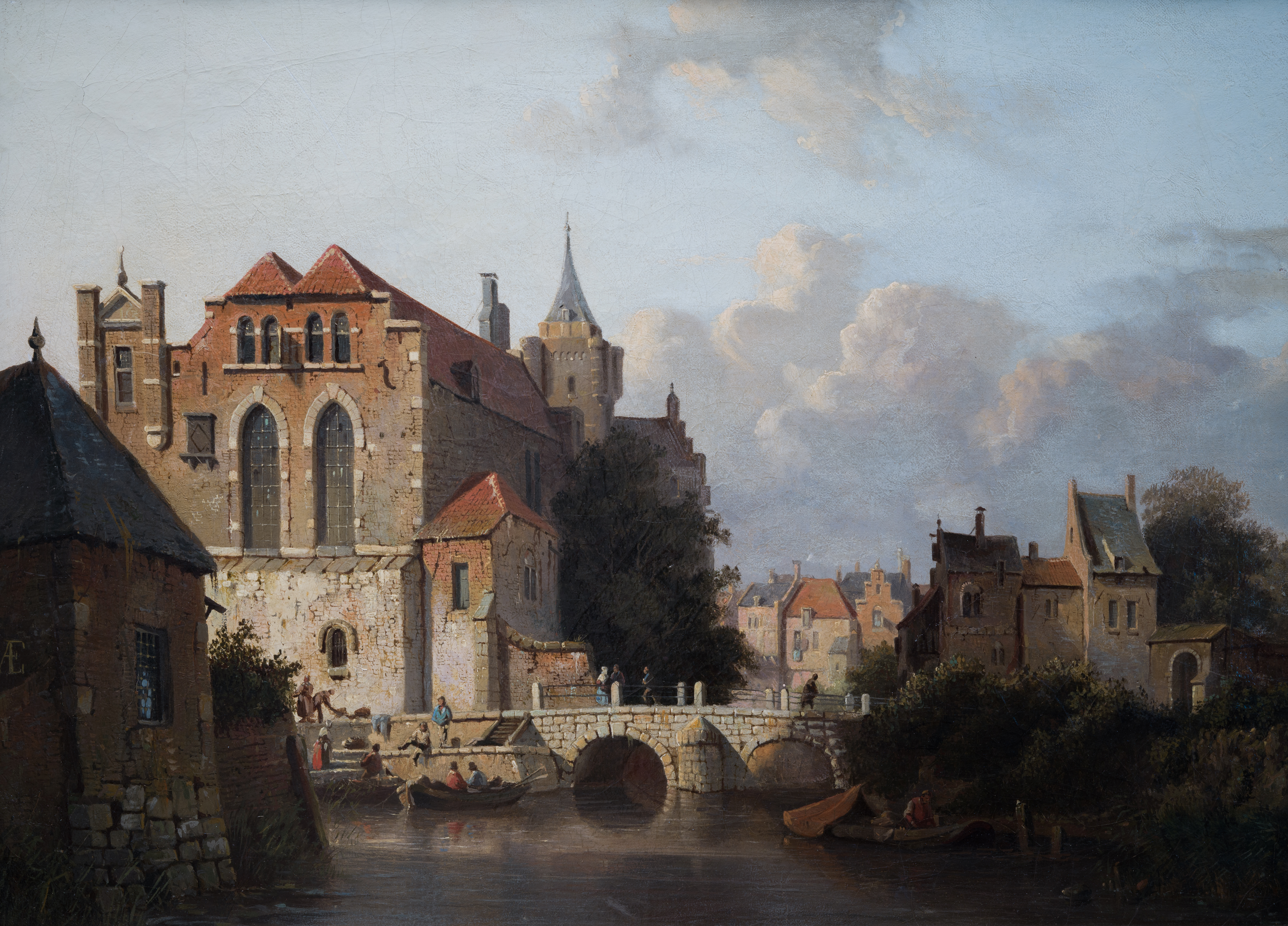
A Dutch Canal Town, With Figures and Boats

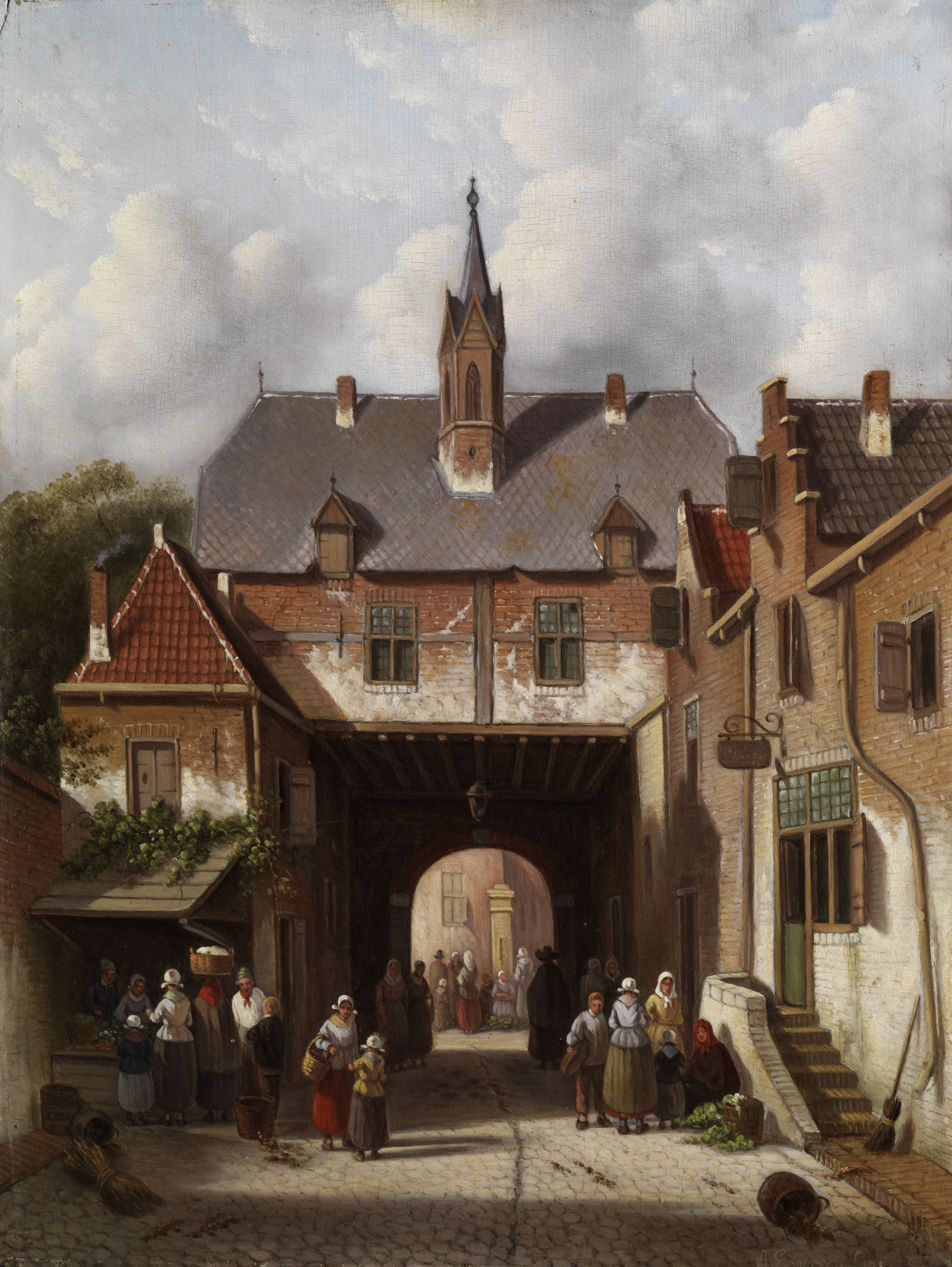
A Dutch cityscape

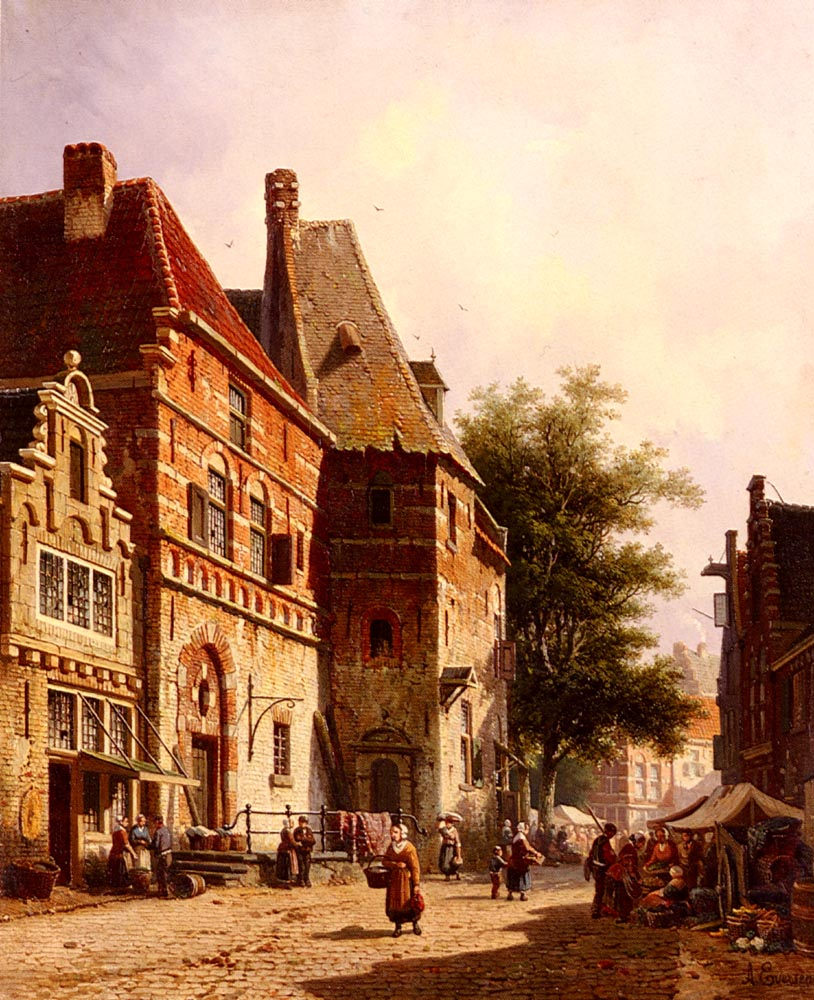
Adrianus Eversen, Sunlit street on market day

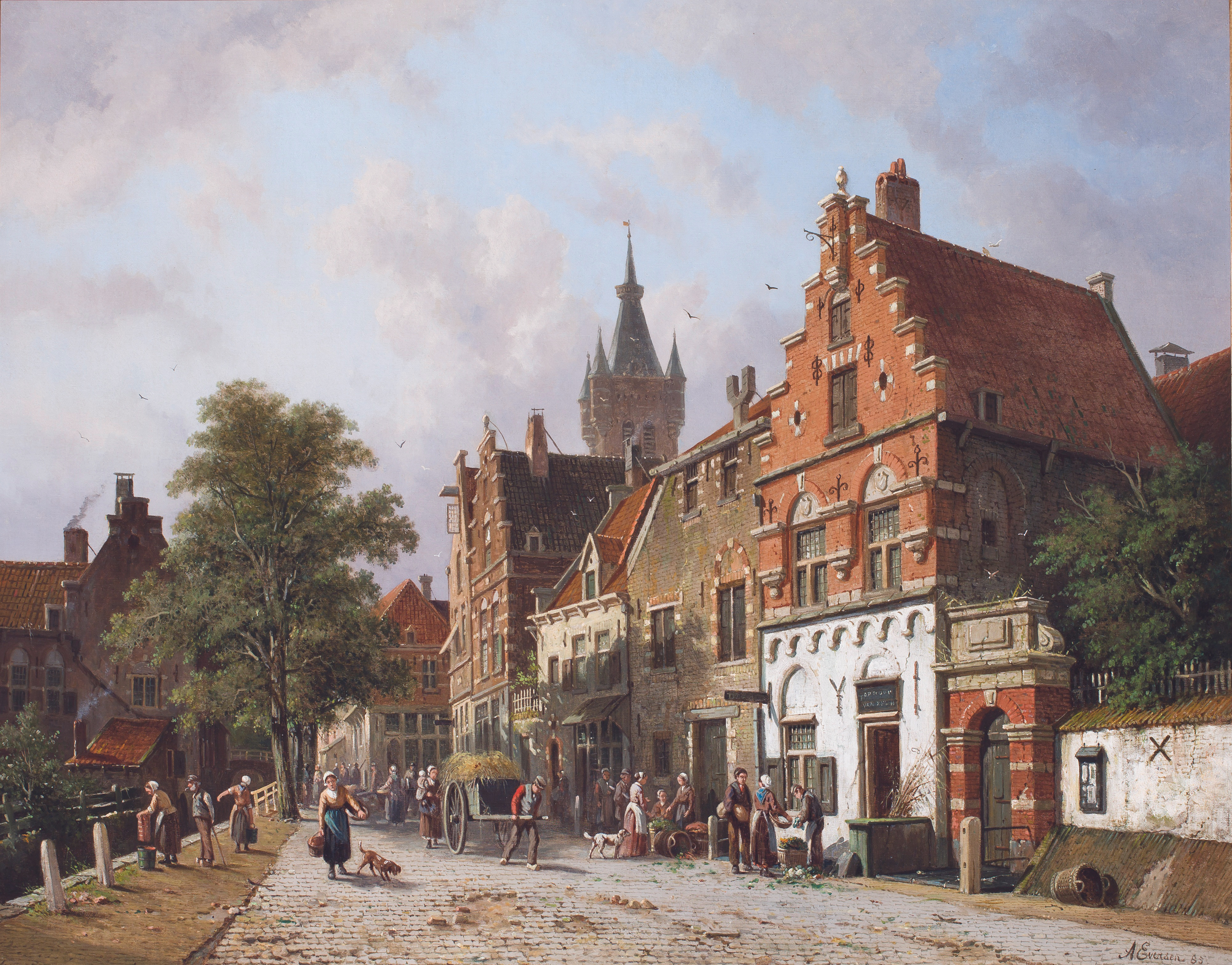
A View In Delft

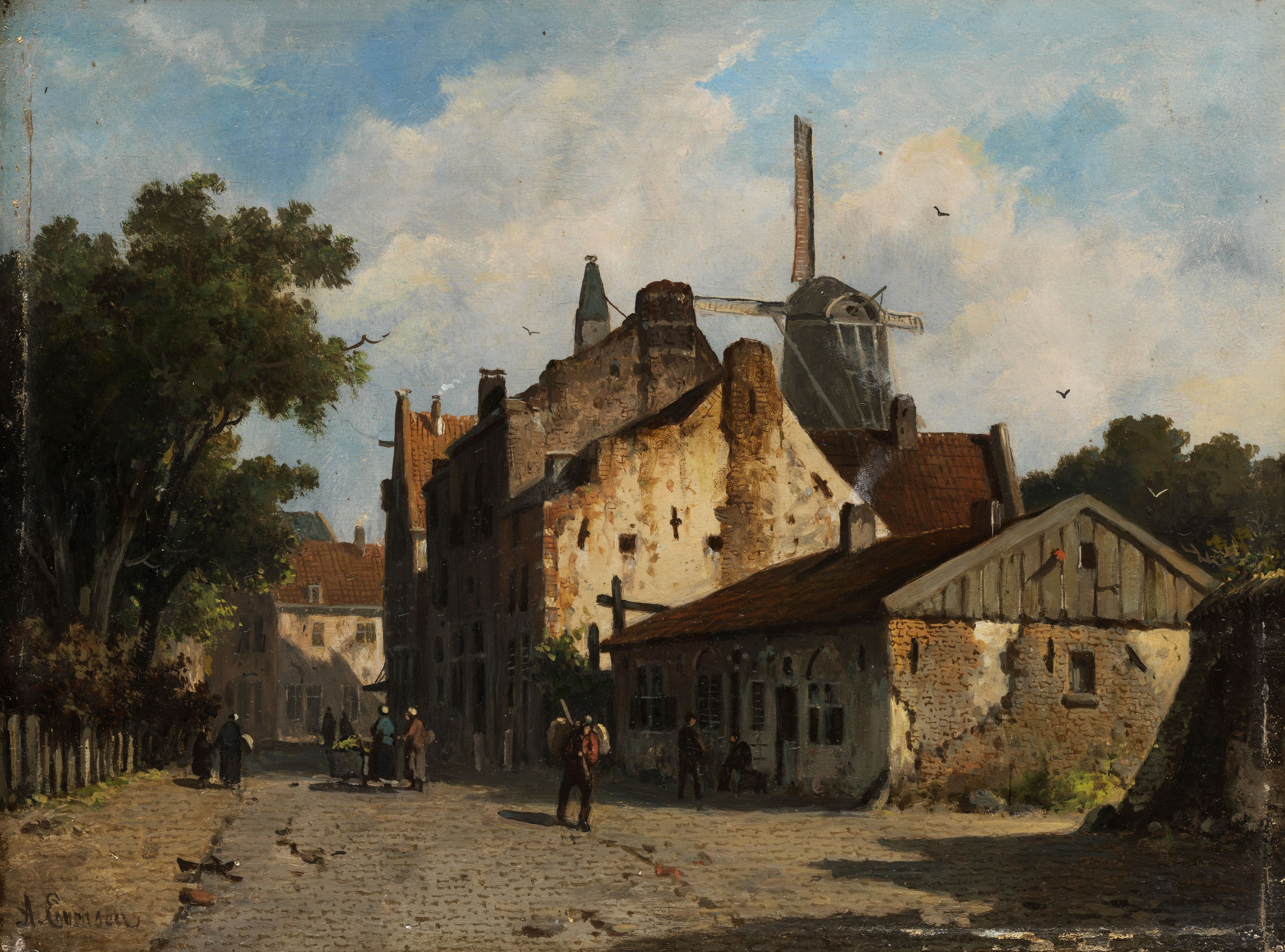
A Dutch cityscape

== See also ==
- Johannes Bosboom
- Johan Jongkind
- Johannes Hermanus Koekkoek
