= Willem Hekking (1796–1862) =

Dutch painter (1796–1862)

- Born: 24 March 1796; Amsterdam
- Died: 20 May 1862 (aged 66); Amsterdam
- Education: Pupil of Theodorus Hekking and Anthonie van den Bosch

Willem Hekking (24 March 1796 – 20 May 1862), also known as Willem Hekking Sr. or Willem Hekking (I), was a Dutch painter and draughtsman of still lifes with flowers and fruit.

== Life ==
Hekking was a son of Theodorus Hekking, a painter of wall hangings. He learned the trade from his father and took drawing lessons from Anthonie van den Bosch. He first worked as a wallpaper painter and then turned to painting flowers. He was active in Amsterdam from about 1811 to 1862.

His pupils included his son Willem Hekking Jr., Martina Adriana Maria van Toulon and Anna Maria van Veeren.

== Work ==
Hekking used watercolour, among other media.

From 1813 to 1856 he exhibited drawings and paintings of flowers and fruit in Amsterdam and Rotterdam. He took part in the Exhibition of Living Masters in Amsterdam in 1813, 1814, 1816 and 1818, and in every Amsterdam edition from 1828 to 1838. At the 1842 exhibition he showed a piece with dead game, flowers and fruit.

In 1981 the Rijksmuseum held a still life with fruit by him, the Rijksprentenkabinet (national print room) a drawing of dahlias, the Amsterdam municipal archives a coloured drawing of a view of the Leidseplein, and the Museum Boijmans Van Beuningen in Rotterdam a drawing of apple blossom.

== Gallery ==
Still Life with Fruit. Rijksmuseum

Bloemen in een glazen vaas, w.o. rozen, irissen, tulpen (Flowers in a glass vase, including roses, irises and tulips). Leiden University Libraries

Gevlamde lila tulpen (Flamed lilac tulips). Leiden University Libraries

Pioenroos (Peony). Leiden University Libraries

Three apples on a branch, watercolour
