= Helen Augusta Hamburger =

British-Dutch artist (1836–1919)

- Born: September 10, 1836; London, United Kingdom
- Died: January 9, 1919 (aged 82); Amsterdam, Netherlands
- Spouse: Augustin Taurel
- Parents: Johan Coenraad Hamburger (father); Eleonora Elisabeth Fairbairn (mother)

Helen Augusta Hamburger (Dutch: Hélène Augusta Hamburger; 10 September 1836 – 9 January 1919) was a British-Dutch painter active in the Netherlands. She mainly painted still lifes of flowers and fruit.

== Biography ==
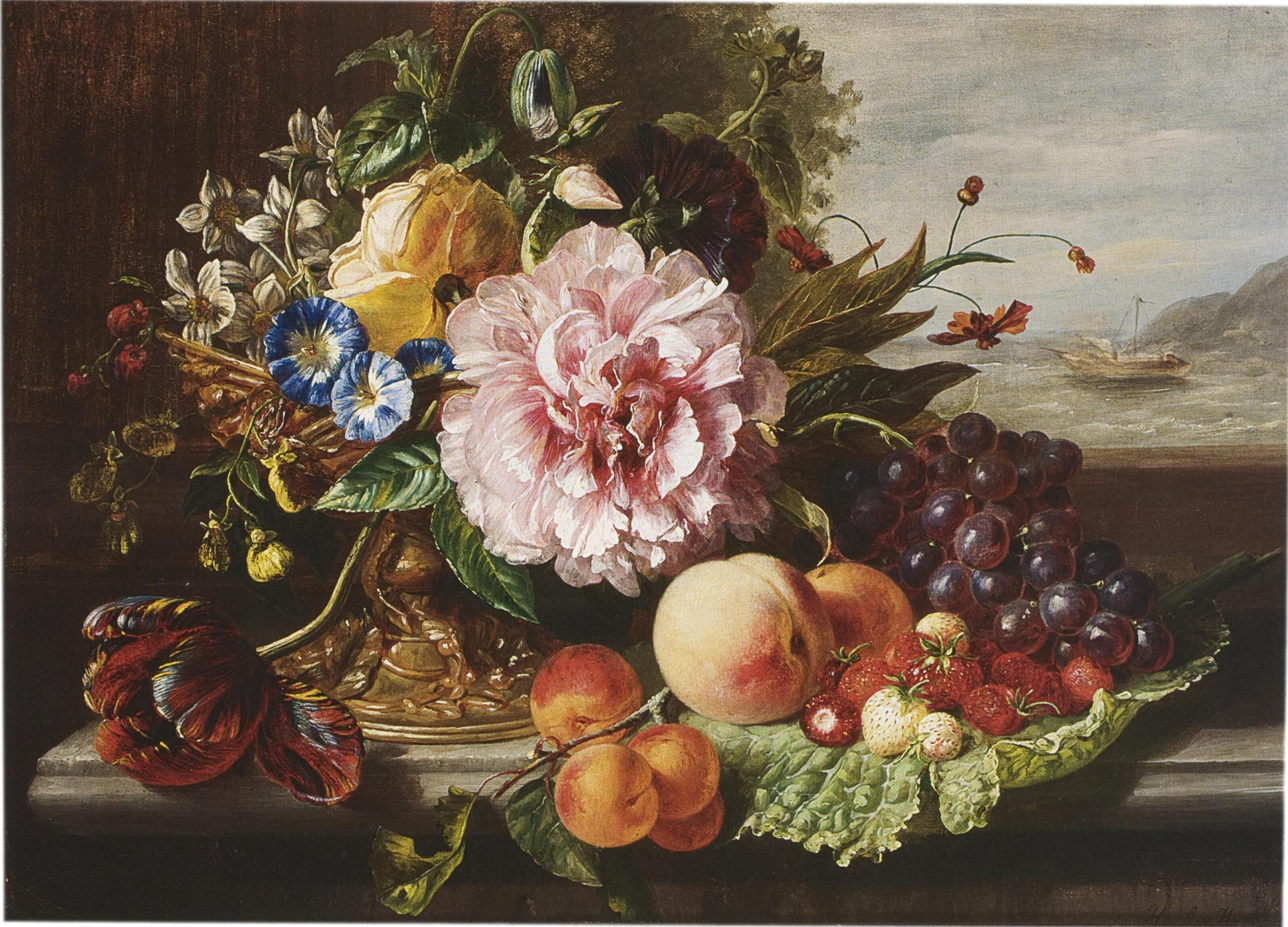
Still life with flowers and fruit (1862)

Hamburger was born in London on 10 September 1836 to Johan Coenraad Hamburger (1809–1871) and Eleonora Elisabeth Fairbairn (1809–1858). Both her parents were also painters – Johan was a painter for King William IV while Eleonora had work purchased by William I of the Netherlands. Shortly after her birth the family relocated to Amsterdam, where her parents became members of the Amsterdam Royal Academy of Art in 1845.

Helen was trained and influenced by her mother, who painted still lifes of flowers and fruit, hunting scenes, and birds. During her time in the Netherlands she participated in the Exhibition of Living Masters in Amsterdam, Groningen and The Hague. In 1865 she married Belgian-French painter Augustin Taurel (1828–1879). After the death of her mother in 1858, she remained in Amsterdam for seven more years before moving to Brussels with her husband and father in 1865. After the deaths of her father in 1871 and husband in 1879, Helen returned to Amsterdam where she remained until her death in 1919, aged 82.

== Works ==
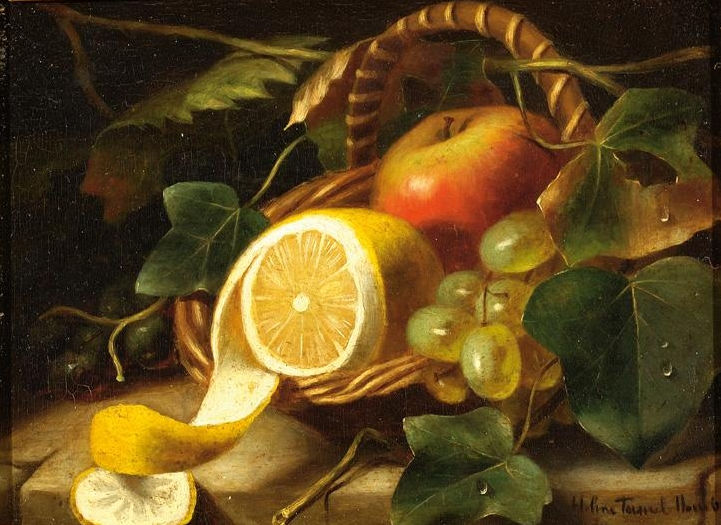
Still life of fruits (1865-1919)

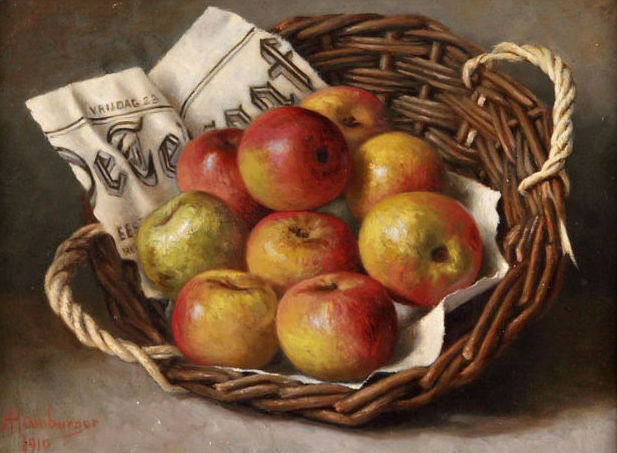
Apples in a basket (1910)
- Still life with flowers and fruit (1862)
- Still life of fruits (1865–1919)
- Apples in a basket (1910)
