= Arti et Amicitiae =

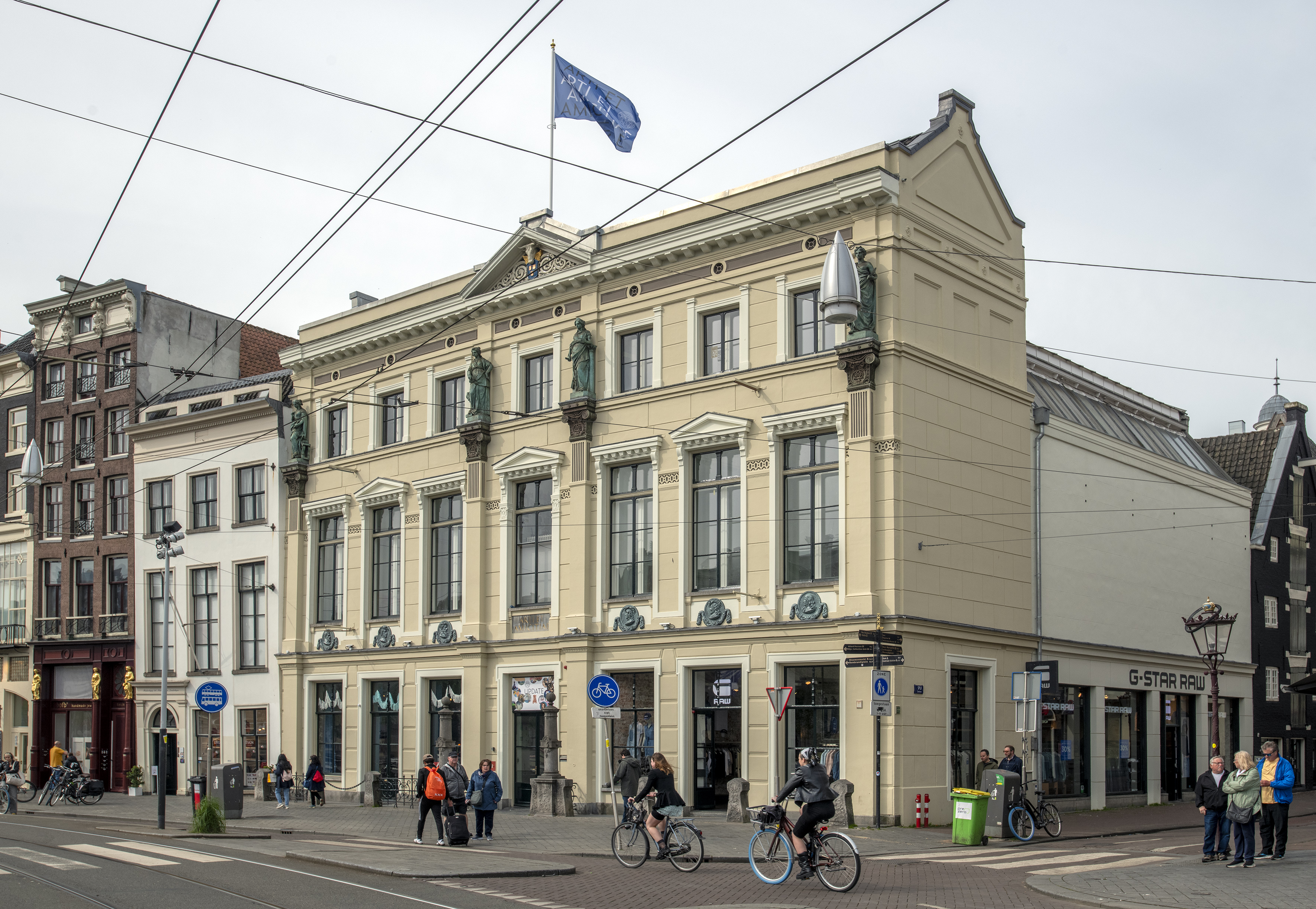
- The society today
- Interactive map of the Arti et Amicitiae area

General information
- Type: Artist's society
- Architectural style: neo-classical
- Location: Amsterdam, Rokin
- Coordinates: 52°22′8.13″N 4°53′29.73″E
- Completed: 1855

Design and construction
- Architect: J. H. Leliman

Arti et Amicitiae (lat .: For Art and Friendship) is a Dutch artist's society founded in 1839, and located on the Rokin in Amsterdam. The Society (also called Arti for short) has played a key role in the Netherlands art scene and in particular in the Amsterdam art schools. It was and is to this day a hub for artists and art lovers in the city of Amsterdam. It is a private institution which supports artists, maintains social networks and offers a pension fund. In recent times it has been one of the venues for the 17th edition of the Sonic Acts Festival.

Arti et Amicitiae is also the name of the building. The complex was merged from two separate buildings and given a white neo-classical facade by J. H. Leliman in 1855.

== History and Structure ==
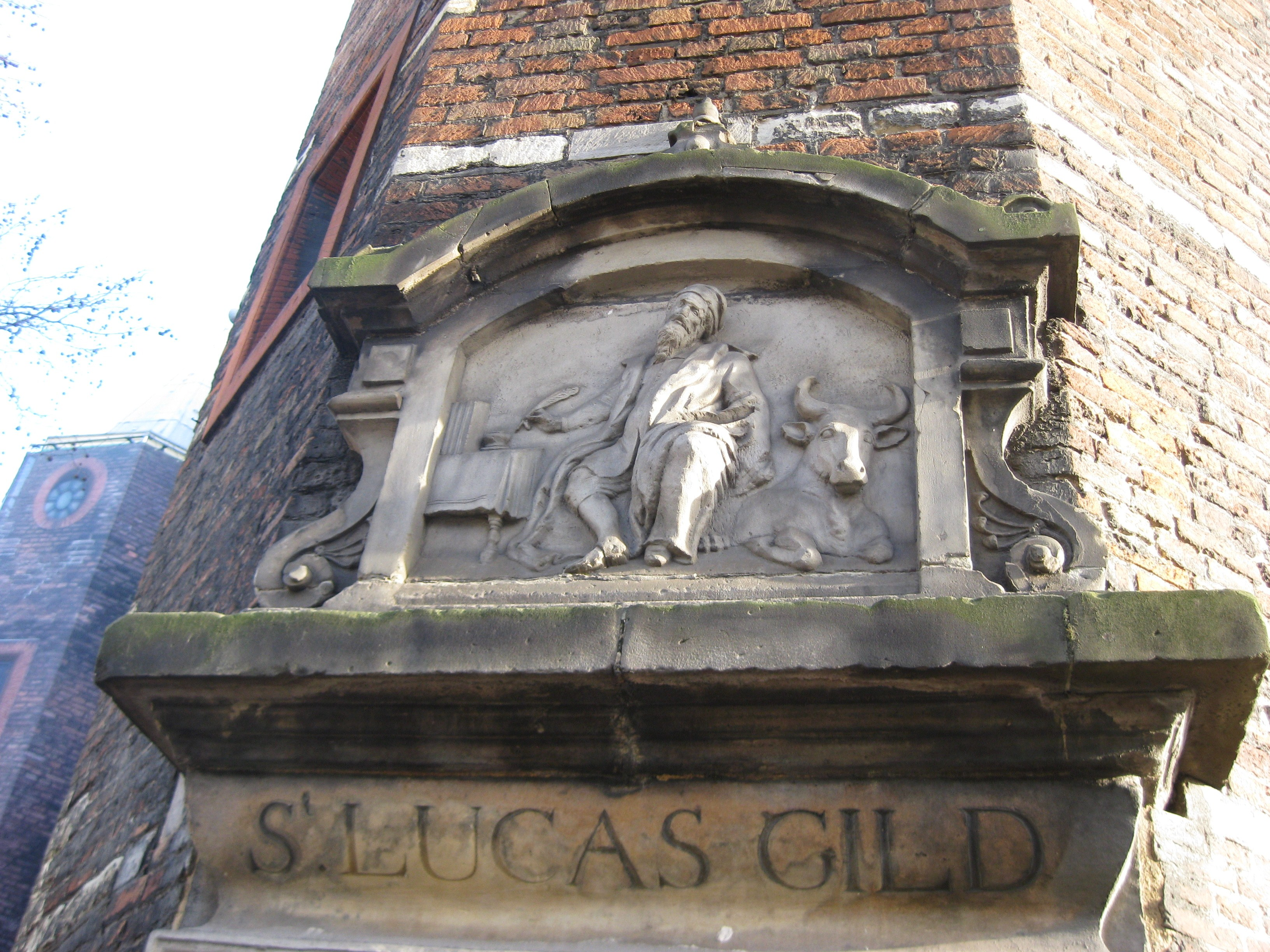
Gable stone of the old Sint Lucas guild above the door of its former location, Waag, Amsterdam.

In 1794 the last Dutch city painter's guild was dissolved during the French occupation by Napoleonic rule. The need for a common meeting place for artists became various clubs and drawing societies. In 1839 the Sociëtait Arti et Amicitiae was founded. A year later the building "Grand Salon Dupond", located in the center of Amsterdam at the Rokin 3, was acquired at an auction. It became the home of this young society. Its aim was to address a distinguished audience and to promote interest in art. Initially it was called Arti et Amicitiae – Sociëtait – Société des Beux on Rokin 3. Today it is called Maatschappij Arti et Amicitiae, or just "Arti". Today the house is assigned the number 112.

In 1841 the new exhibition Salon was created according to plans by the architect Marinus van Elven Geradur Tetar on the first floor. He was professor and director of the architecture department at the Royal Academy of Fine Arts in Amsterdam. To enhance this cooperative society of Fine Arts, in 1841 the King William II was given honorary membership.

In 1880, the reestablishment of the St. Lucas Artist's Association took place in Amsterdam. This had nothing in common with the construction and alignment of the old guilds. Like other artist clubs, it was a meeting place, a place of training, and a meeting point of art lovers and collectors. However, it was unable to compete with the Sociëteit Arti et Amicitiae because it was considered too academic. Added to this there was the problem of a lack of exhibition space.

Of great importance were the art appreciation evenings. Art lovers (amateurs) and collectors gathered around the artist who showed photographs and lithographs. The declared objective was to stimulate interest in the art, and then finally to improve the economic situation of the artist. This was new for artist societies. After the guilds had vanished as an economic instrument, this form of art promotion was the best alternative. For the members they created a widows and orphans fund along the lines of the old guilds funded by a portion of entrance fees for artists, the sale of exhibition catalogs and membership fees of the honorary members. Other income was generated from sales from the collection of the Historical Gallery.

== Arti et Amicitiae – the politics ==
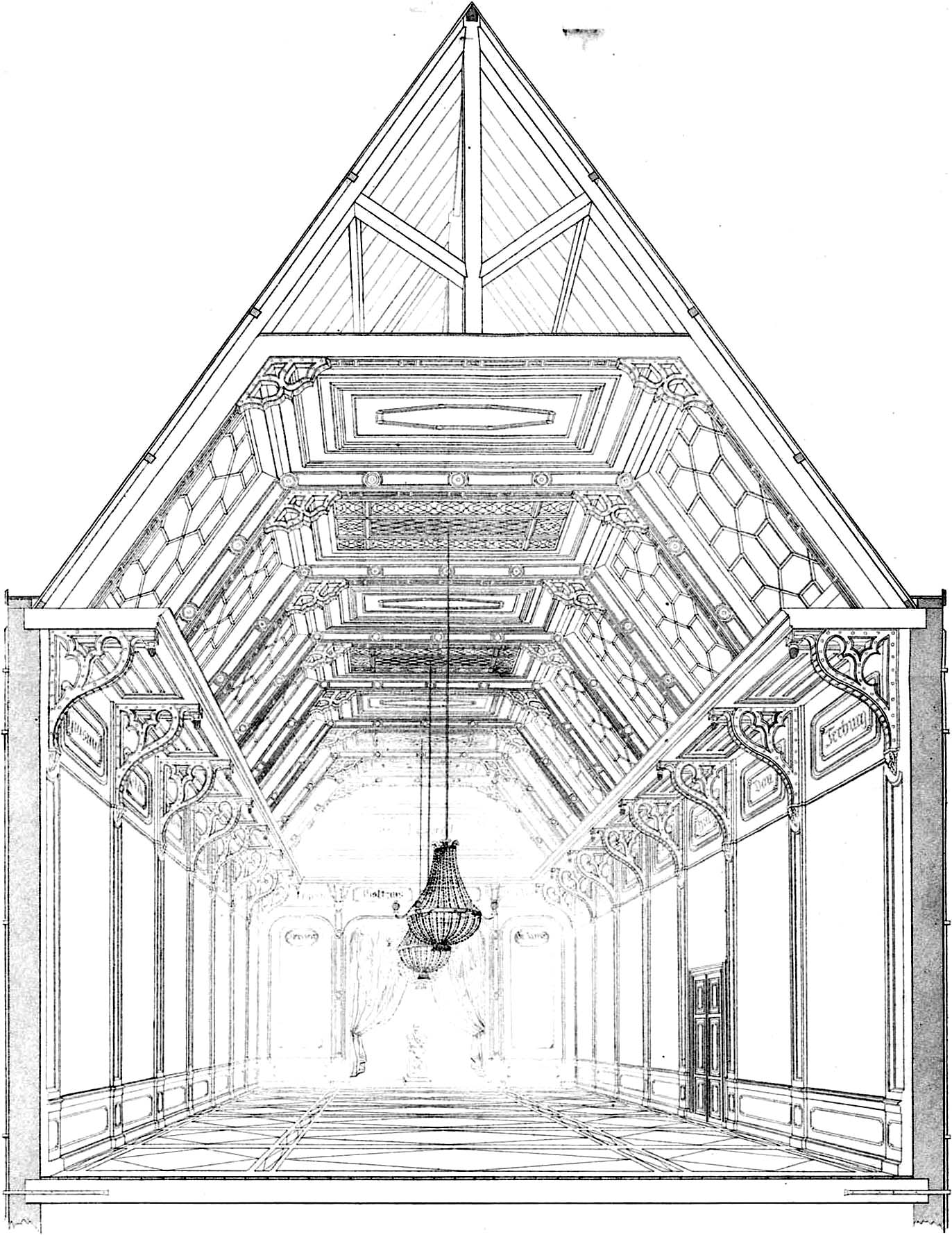
Plan for exhibition space, 1841.

It was decided by Napoleon Bonaparte that the art world always had to be operated and determined by the rulers. In the Art Academy of Delft non-artists made art policy. The ranks of Soziëteit aimed to create an effective counter-movement. The aim has always been to guarantee the sovereignty of society – which has been retained steadfastly to this day. This was, and still is today, above all the financial as an art policy. To increase the popularity of an advertising campaign for a statue of a very important son of the city – Rembrandt van Rijn – has been initiated.

A founding member of Arti et Amiticae, Louis Royer, created this statue. In 1852 it was unveiled by King William III. One of the main concerns was the creation of a historical gallery with 103 works from scenes of national history. In 1841 the increase took place in the new exhibition room. The interesting effect was, a glass roof let sunlight into the elongated exhibition room. It was possible because the new steel construction allowed in the roof area a continuous band of windows.

The shading effect has been achieved via an internal cornice. The vertical exhibit space was divided on pilasters. This is well recognized for its individually tailored art exhibitions. This is both to members and non-members. The latter include, inter alia, Marc Chagall, Vincent van Gogh and Max Liebermann.

The company is called today about 550 artists and 1100 as members of her own sponsor.

The very valuable and extensive historical library that was built up over the history of this association, has been delivered to the Van Gogh Museum in Amsterdam. – The historical archives is still there.

== The Building ==
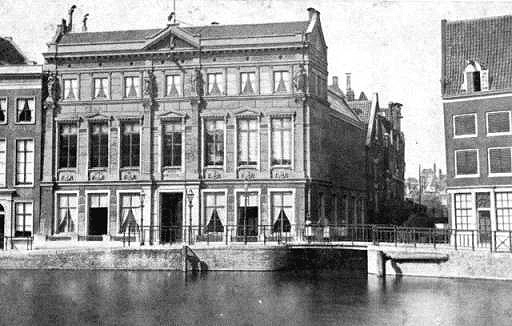
The house of the Sociëteit Arti et Amicitiae with the urban situation at Gracht Ronkin at the end of the 19th century

The accommodation at the Rokin 3 have been maintained until today. The semi-detached house is characterized by the built-in cast-iron supports. The glass roof ensures a uniform illumination.

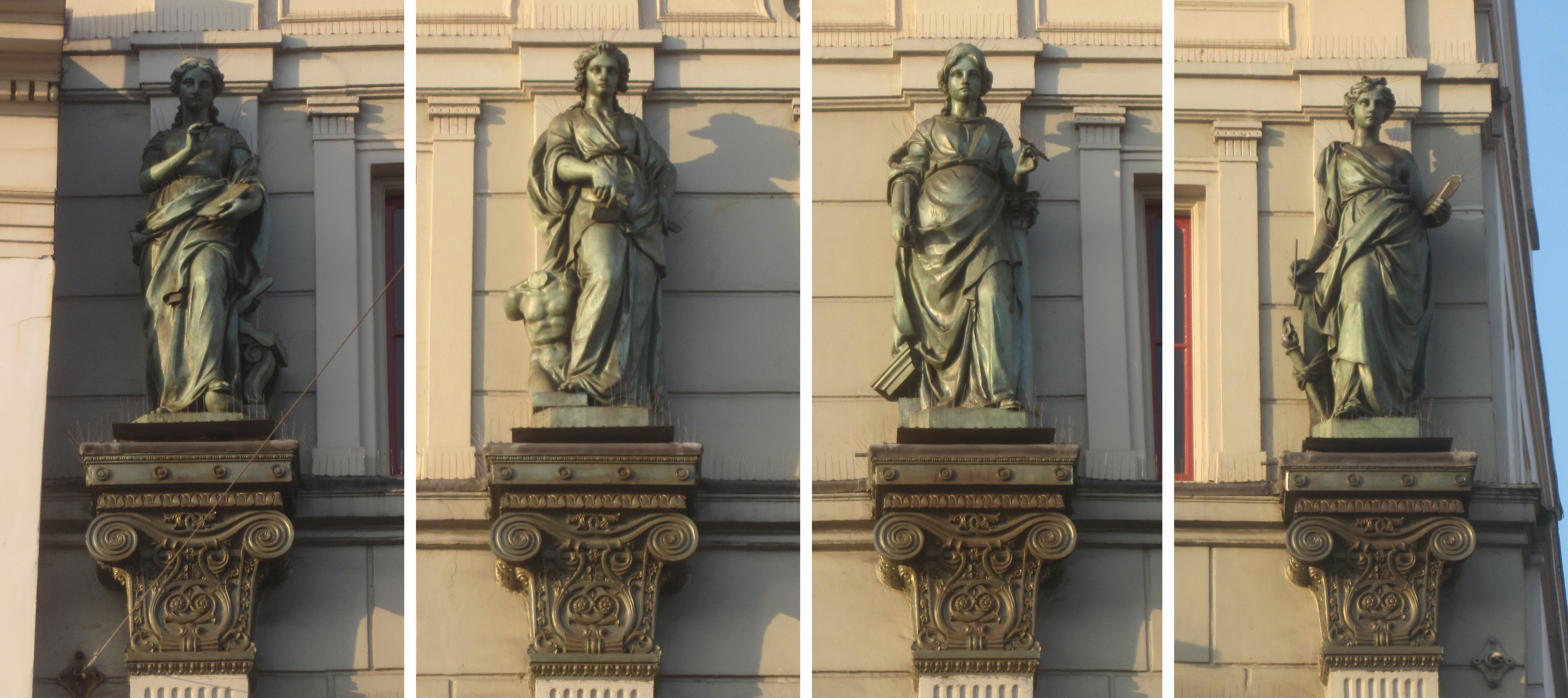
Four allegories (Architecture, Sculpture, Painting, Engraving) on the facade of "Arti et Amicitiae", Rokin, Amsterdam.

The neo-classical facade has been accentuated by the four allegory building, sculpture, engraving and painting – they are standing for the four in the house united art forms. These sculptures date back to Franz Stracke. In the facade are located a hand as a landmark and the ox, patron saint of the former guild of St. Lucas. The architect Hendrikus Petrus Berlage had taken the indoor design. Here showrooms, boardrooms and a private club room have been created.

In 1893/94 the first rebuilding took place. The main entrance was moved to the Spui and the staircase and the hallway had been renewed. The architects Berlage and Beys, both members of the Artists' Association, distinguished themselves responsible for this construction project. In the years 1962–64 the building was completely restored and modernized. The main entrance was moved back to the Rokin. The exhibition rooms have been modernized. The precious woodwork of the interiors and the furniture works are still largely intact. In 2009, the adjacent building no. 114 was purchased in order to integrate new premises.

In the precious staircase is a gallery of the great painters of the 2nd Golden Age of Dutch painting. These are such names as Lizzy Ansingh, George Hendrik Breitner, Marius Bauer, Bernd Blommers, the brothers Jacob Maris, Willem Maris and Matthijs Maris, Isaac Israëls, Jozef Israëls, Lourens Alma Tadema, Hendrik Willem Mesdag, Jan Sluijters, Jan Toorop, Jan Hendrik Weissenbruch, Willem Witsen, Coba Ritsema and Kees Marks.

== Willink van Collenprijs ==
In 1878 Wilhelm Ferdinand Willink van Collen had decreed in his will. An amount of 30,000 guilders was to support the Sociëteit Arti et Amicitiae. He had the task of promoting the young Dutch artists during their study phase through a stipend. From 1880 the Willink van Collenprijs was awarded with interruptions until 1950. First Arti had oriented to the tiered pricing of Paris Salon. From 1890 only one 1st prize was awarded to the new regulation. In 1897, 1909 and 1910 and in 1917 it was awarded several times. In Amsterdam this idea of support for artists had fallen on fertile soil. This can be seen in its long duration and the recognition of a number of award winners up to the present time in 1950.

== Prize of Sociëtait Arti et Amicitiae ==
In addition to the aforementioned prize, a separate prize for artist was awarded by the Sociëtait yet. This was also highly sought after.

In the Netherlands there was the art exhibition of living artists, which took place in the two- to three-year intervals. Thus, the young artist had three ways to make a name and to make known their art in this way.

== Important members ==
- Elisabeth Adriani-Hovy
- Johannes Evert Hendrik Akkeringa
- August Allebé
- Louis Apol
- Floris Arntzenius
- Franciscus Hermanus Bach
- Constantia Arnolda Balwé
- Nicolaas Bastert
- Jo Bauer
- Marius Bauer
- Gerard Bilders
- Johannes Warnardus Bilders
- Bernardus Johannes Blommers
- Henri Frédéric Boot
- Hendrik van Borssum Buisman
- Johan Braakensiek
- George Hendrik Breitner
- Jacobus Ludovicus Cornet
- Ko Cossaar
- Pierre Cuypers
- Franz Deutmann
- Adrianus Eversen
- Eduard Frankfort
- Arnold Marc Gorter
- Jan Grégoire
- Petrus Franciscus Greive
- Sophie Jacoba Wilhelmina Grothe
- Hendrik Johannes Havermann
- Marie Heineken
- Herman Heijenbrock
- Bartholomeus Johannes van Hove
- Johannes Frederik Hulk
- John Frederik Hulk
- Isaac Israëls
- Jozef Israëls
- Eduard Karsen
- Kasparus Karsen
- Petrus Kiers
- Johannes Hermanus Barend Koekkoek
- Arnold Hendrik Koning
- Jan Adam Kruseman
- Charles Leickert
- Jacobus van Looy
- Jacob Maris
- Anton Mauve
- Samuel Jessurun de Mesquita
- Frans Molenaar
- Piet Mondriaan
- Willem Carel Nakken
- Ferdinand Hart Nibbrig
- Wijnand Otto Jan Nieuwenkamp
- Frans Oerder
- Jan van Oort
- Benjamin Prins
- Louis Raemaekers
- Anthon van Rappard
- Charles Rochussen
- Willem Roelofs
- Philip Sadée
- Geraldine van de Sande Bakhuyzen
- Julius van de Sande Bakhuyzen
- Hendrik Jacobus Scholten
- Johann Georg Schwartze
- Thérèse Schwartze
- Pauline Suij
- Thamine Tadama-Groeneveld
- Jan Toorop
- Kees Verschuren
- Wouterus Verschuur
- Floris Verster
- Hubert Vos
- Marie Wandscheer
- Herman Johannes van der Weele
- Dorothea Arnoldine von Weiler
- Johannes Cornelis Wienecke
- Jan Hillebrand Wijsmuller
- Abraham Willet
- Ernst Witkamp
- Willem Witsen
- Elsa Woutersen-van Doesburgh
- Willem de Zwart

== The society awarded medals to young talents and the list of the winners ==
- Jo Bauer
- Willem van den Berg,
- Jeanne Bieruma Oosting
- Henri Frédéric Boot
- Kuno Brinks
- Arnout Colnot
- Ed Dukkers
- Dirk Filarski
- Eduard Frankfort
- Dirk van Gulik (1904-1982)
- Theodoor Heynes
- Kees Heynsius
- Paul Husner
- Germ de Jong
- Jan Kagie
- Otto B. de Kat
- Hein Kever
- Willem Knip
- Willemina Johanna Alberta Knottenbelt.
- Ger Langeweg
- Hubert van Lith
- Nel van Lith
- Anton Mauve
- Jan Meefout
- Arie van Mever
- Dirk Berend Nanninga
- Bart Peizel
- Wim van de Plas
- Geo Poggenbeek
- Hans Royaards
- Jan van Tongeren
- Leendert van der Vlist
- Gerhard Westermann
