= Albarta ten Oever =

Dutch painter (1772–1854)

Albarta ten Oever (17 February 1772, in Groningen – 22 January 1854, in Groningen) was a Dutch painter, best remembered for her portraits and landscape paintings in the style of Salomon van Ruysdael and Jan van Goyen. A pupil of the Academie Minerva, her works were exhibited in the Exhibition of Living Masters in 1818 and 1841.
