= Saar de Swart =

Dutch sculptor

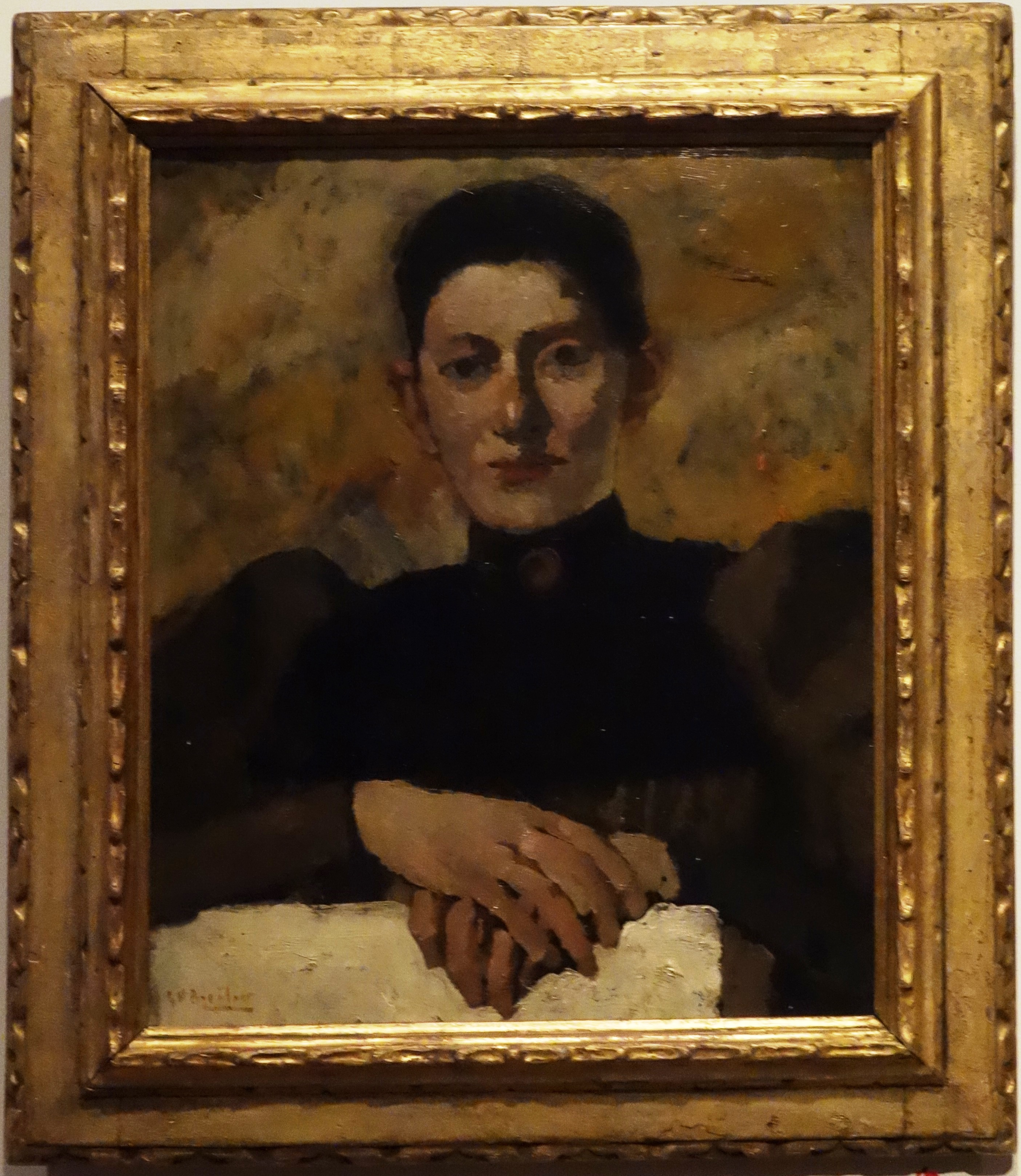
A portrait of Saar de Swart painted by George Hendrik Breitner (1857-1923).

Elizabeth Sara Clasina de Swart (6 August 1861 – 12 August 1951), whose chosen name was 'Saar' de Swart, was a sculptor born to the Dutch painter Corstianus Hendrikus de Swart and his wife, Elisabeth Sara IJntema in Arnhem, Netherlands.

== Life and career ==
Sara's early life was marked by an unhappy marriage between her parents in Mennonite. She was not enrolled in local education but received tutelage from her mother and father in their respective careers. De Swart's early art career was influenced by a short stint at the National School for Applied Arts in Amsterdam and her sculptural training by Lambertus Zijl. This was funded by the inheritance she collected after her mother's death.

After studying, de Swart went on to live with her then girlfriend, Anna Vis, in a shared home on the Oosterpark. In this shared home, de Swart lived with Willem Witsen, who would go on to become a famous Dutch painter, drawing on influences from the Hague School. Like de Swart's partner, Witsen was also a painter and draftsmen. During this time de Swart mingled with her Tachtiger contemporaries although many objected to her openly lesbian lifestyle, despite her financial support. De Swart later moved to the small villa Het Gooi, near Laren, with her life partner, Emilie van Kerckhoff.

in 1889, as her career in sculpture bloomed, de Swart was taken under the instruction of French sculptor, Auguste Rodin. During this time, de Swart lived and worked in Paris. Here she frequented artist cafés and lent her support to installations. She went on to own work from both Rodin and Van Gogh. Her trips back to Amsterdam and her rejection of the painter Willem Karsen's love lead to toxic rumors of her sexuality being spread around her community. A friend of de Swart's, Jan Veth, then organized to put an end to the situation at Café Suisse, which quieted the rumors.

De Swart made frequent travels to Indonesia starting in 1908. Due to financial problems, de Swart sold most of her collection and settled with van Kerckhoff in Capri. On 4 March 1919, she was admitted to the Theosophical Society. The couple lived in Capri, although separated, until de Swart's death in 1951.

== Work ==
Two of de Swart's works, Indian Buffalo and Balinese Dancer, are documented under the Mahler Foundation's archive. Another sculpture of hers, Boy With A Turtle, is housed in the Singer Museum in Laren. Throughout her life she contributed both financial support and artwork to a number of exhibitions, including The Woman 1813-1913. She also sold works at an Amsterdam craft shop. Against Rodin's training, de Swart went on to make mostly small bronze sculptures. However, she was unfortunately not known for her work as much as she was known for her muse status. She was coined with the term "the Muse of the Tachtigers." This is due to the fact that the writer, Willem Kloos, whom she met in Amsterdam, and the painter Eduard Karsen both fell in love with her in spite of her open homosexuality.
