= Martina Adriana Maria van Toulon =

Dutch painter

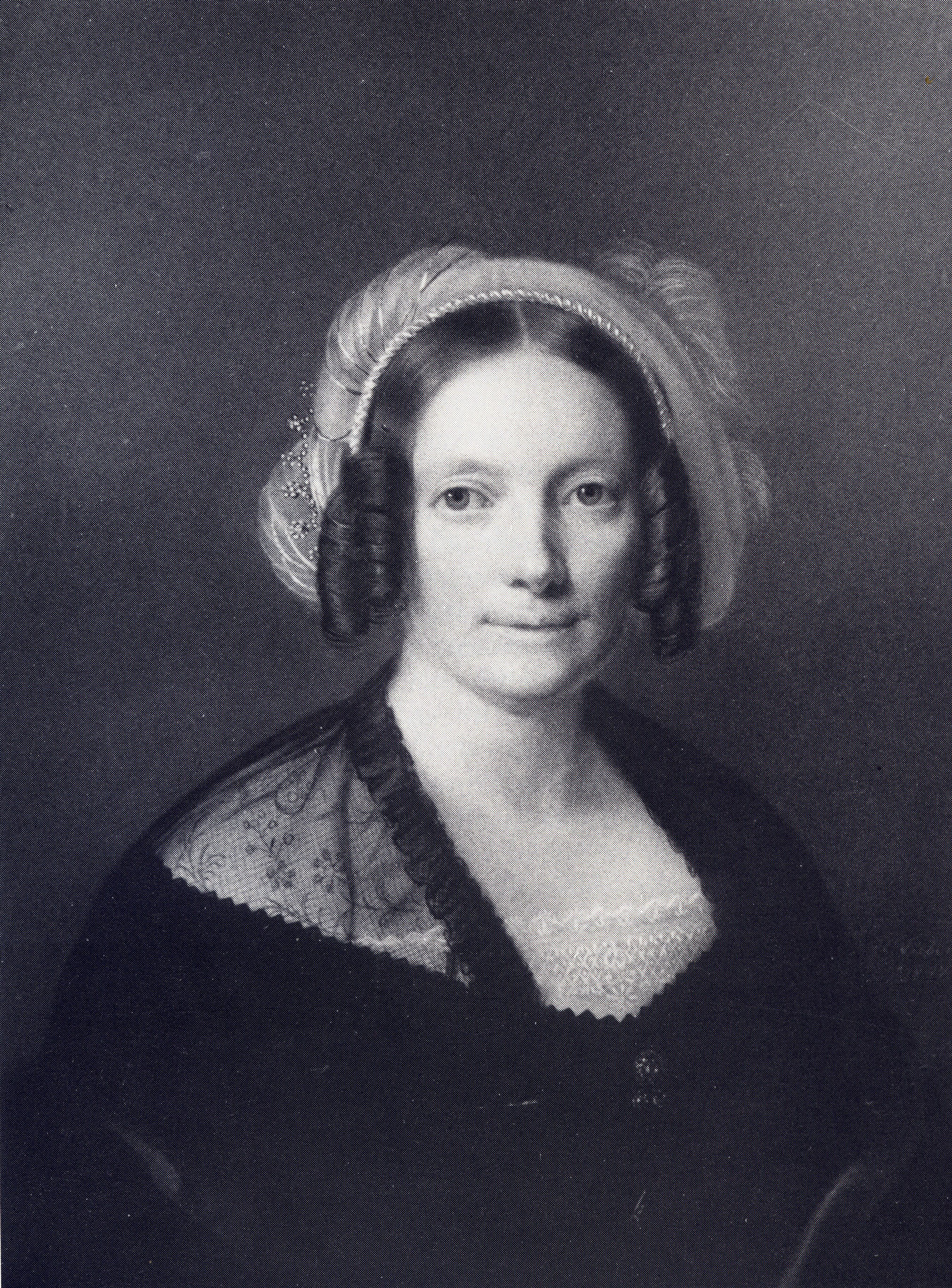
- Born: The Hague, The Netherlands
- Died: Utrecht, The Netherlands

Martina Adriana Maria van Toulon was a Dutch artist who was active from around 1877 until her death in 1880. she specialized in painting still lifes, particularly focusing on floral compositions, fruits and game.

== Biography ==
Martina van Toulon was born in The Hague as the eldest child of Lodewijk van Toulon, a wealthy member of the Court of Cassation, and Johanna van Nispen. She spent her early years in Gouda with her three sisters and brother. Between 1811 and 1813, the family lived in Paris due to her father's professional obligations.

From a young age, Martina displayed a talent for drawing and painting. She studied under Willem Hekking, an Amsterdam-based wallpaper and still life painter. She began exhibiting her works at Amsterdam's biennial exhibitions of Living Masters in 1822, where she presented still lifes that gained critical acclaim.

Martina's reputation as an artist grew steadily. In 1828, she was awarded honorary membership of the Amsterdam's Royal Academy of Art. In 1833, she became an honorary member of the Rotterdam artists' society Arti Sacrum.

== Works ==
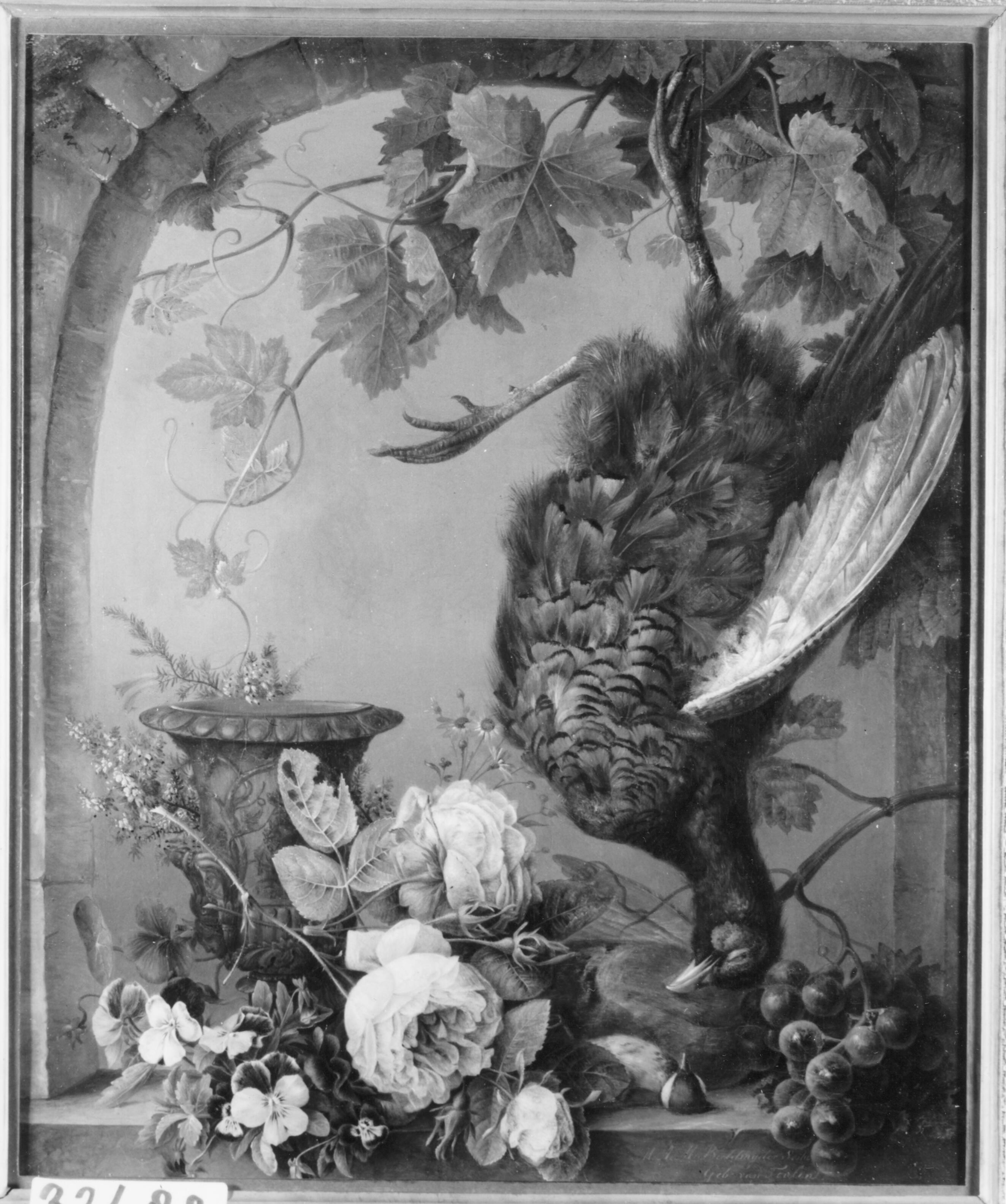
Detail of a still life with flowers and dead pheasant (before 1881)

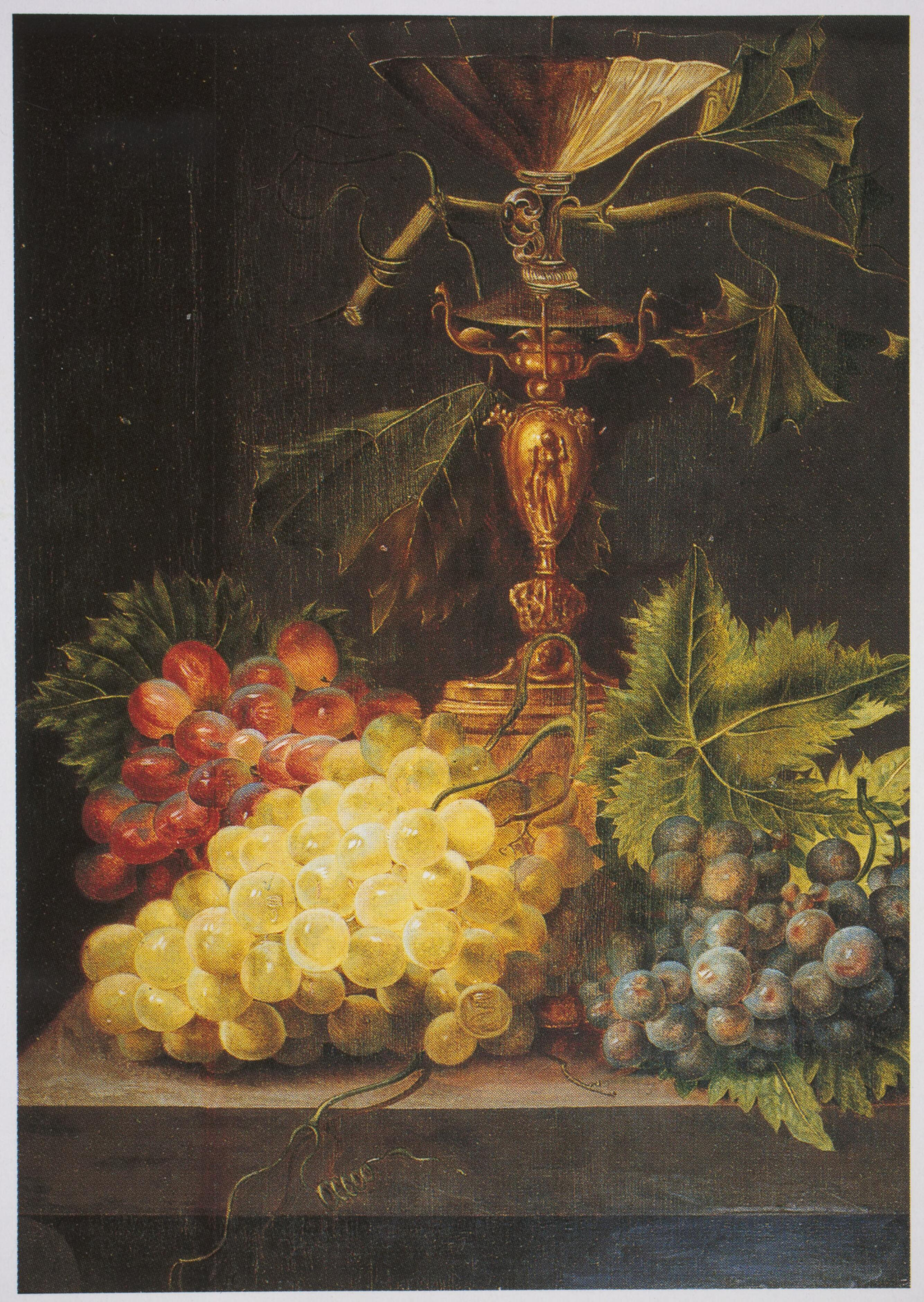
Detail of a still life with a goblet and a bunch of grapes (before 1881)
