= Hendrik Gerrit ten Cate =

Dutch painter (1803–1856)

- Portrait of Ten Cate. Wood engraving after a drawing by Johan Coenraad Hamburger, 1842
- Born: 22 February 1803; Amsterdam, Netherlands
- Died: 6 March 1856 (aged 53); Amsterdam, Netherlands
- Education: Pupil of George Pieter Westenberg

Hendrik Gerrit (H.G.) ten Cate (22 February 1803 – 6 March 1856) was a Dutch painter, watercolourist and draughtsman. He was born and died in Amsterdam, where he worked from 1821 until his death, making landscapes, cityscapes, portraits and still lifes.

== Life ==
Ten Cate trained under George Pieter Westenberg. His working life began around 1820; from 1821 to 1856 he worked in Amsterdam. His pupils included Cornelis Springer, Adrianus Eversen, Kaspar Karsen, Hendrik Jacob Elzer, Matthias Parré and Anna Maria van Veeren.

Besides his career as an artist, he was an amateur entomologist.

He died at the age of 53, leaving a widow and a large family.

== Work ==
Ten Cate was a painter, watercolourist and draughtsman, and worked in oil paint, ink and watercolour. His subjects included landscapes and winter landscapes, cityscapes, portraits, genre scenes, seascapes, animals, and still lifes of flowers and fruit; in his later years he also painted moonlit cityscapes. He is remembered especially for his drawings in colour and in India ink.

In 1834 the Felix Meritis society in Amsterdam awarded a gold medal to his painting Een stadskermis bij avond (A town fair in the evening). Christiaan Kramm described him as a "hoogst verdienstelijke" ("highly meritorious") painter of moonlit and candlelit scenes.

== Work in collections ==
In 1997 the Teylers Stichting in Haarlem, the Gemeentemuseum in The Hague, the Amsterdam City Archives and the Museum Boijmans Van Beuningen held major collections of his work. In 2026 Boijmans Van Beuningen held sixteen of his works, including winter landscapes, polder landscapes and a village fair by night.

In 2026 the Rijksmuseum held, among other works, the pen and brush drawing Dorpsfeest (Village festival) of 1840, which it received in 1921 from the bequest of J.G. de Groot Jamin, and a view of the Torensluis and the Jan Roodenpoortstoren in Amsterdam of 1829. In 2026 the Kröller-Müller Museum held Country House with a Road, Trees and Barns of 1825, in chalk and paint on paper.

In 2018 the Metropolitan Museum of Art acquired Wooded Landscape with Figures by a Pond, a drawing of 1826 in black chalk, brush and grey wash. The museum calls it unusual that Ten Cate applied the black chalk over the wash as well, giving the bark texture and stressing the shapes of the leaves.

== Gallery ==
The Torensluis and the Jan Roodenpoortstoren in Amsterdam, 1829. Rijksmuseum

Festival in de Haarlemmer hout (Festival in the Haarlemmerhout), 1832. Rijksmuseum

Kermis op de Botermarkt bij avond (Fair on the Botermarkt in the evening), 1834. Amsterdam Museum

Wintergezicht op haven (Winter view of a harbour). Museum aan de Stroom

De oude zandhoekschans voorbij de Haarlemmerpoort te Amsterdam (The old Zandhoek bastion beyond the Haarlemmerpoort in Amsterdam). Amsterdam Museum
