= Kaspar Karsen =

Dutch painter (1810–1896)

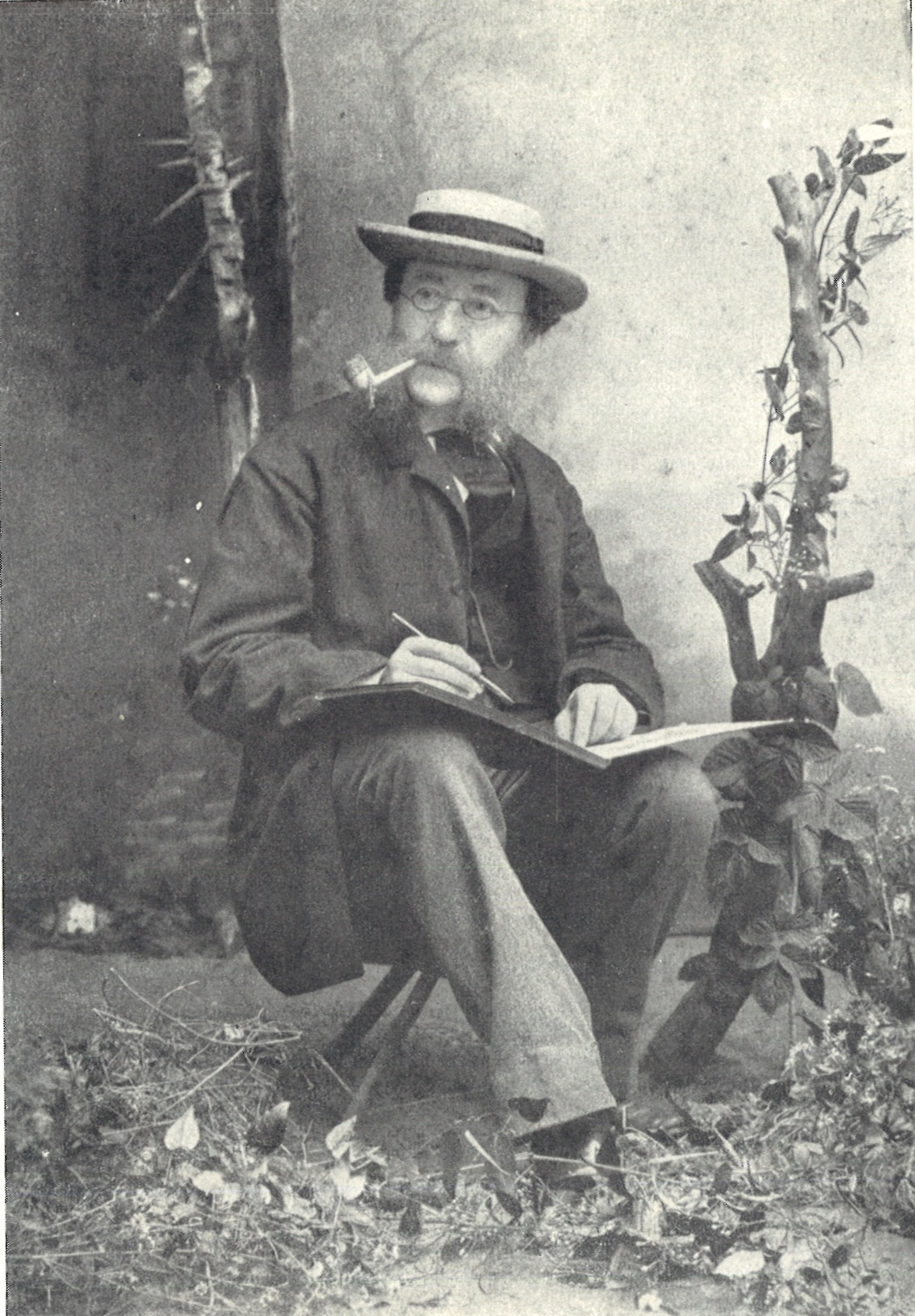
Kaspar Karsen

Kaspar, or Kasparus Karsen (April 2, 1810 in Amsterdam – July 24, 1896 in Biebrich near Wiesbaden, Germany) was a 19th-century painter from the Northern Netherlands who specialised in townscapes.

== Biography ==
He was a pupil of Hendrik Gerrit ten Cate, Dirck Vettewinkel, and George Pieter Westenberg, who later taught Cornelis Springer 1835-1837 and worked in Haarlem 1842–1844. He became a member of Arti et Amicitiae in 1836 and enjoyed making trips to Prague and Germany. Besides Springer, his pupils were Johannes Frederik Hulk, his son, Eduard Karsen, Henricus Jacobus Levelt, Coen Metzelaar, Henry Mosselman, and Alexander Oltmans.

== Works ==
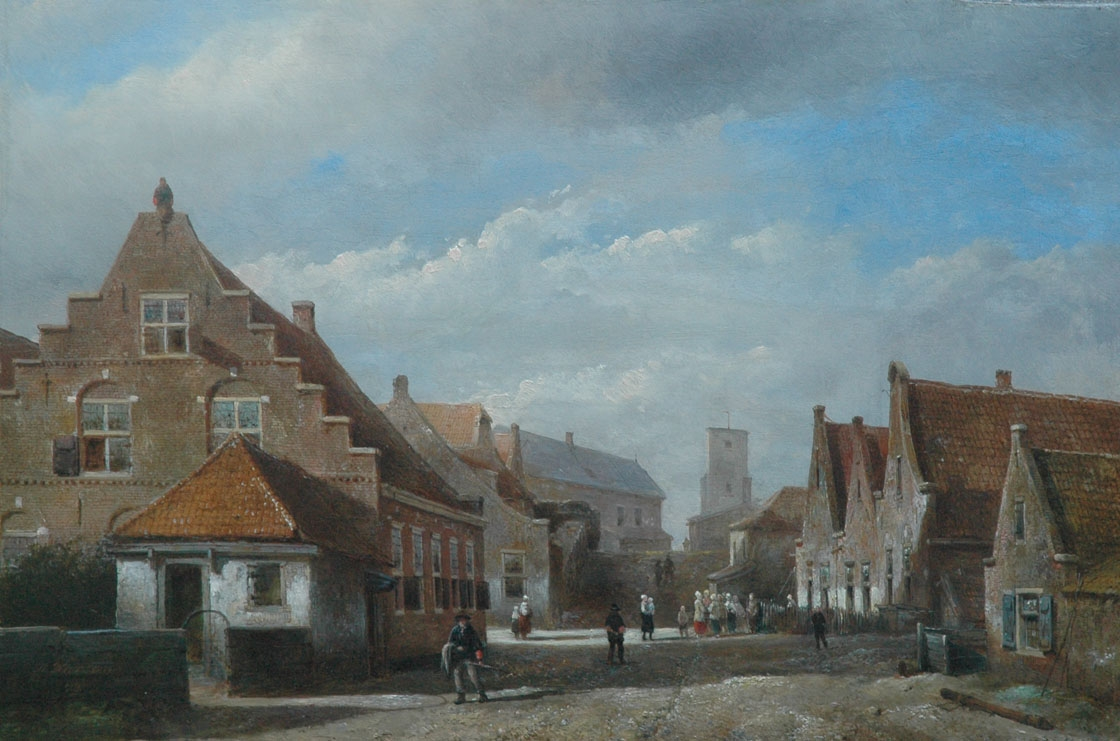
Village street with figures

- The Amsterdam stock exchange before its demolition in 1837 (1836)
- Een Winterdag-Windhaven (1870), Atelier Carmel Gallery
- Ice Skaters on the Canal (1880), Atelier Carmel Gallery
- View on the Hague, 17th Century (1852), 340x200cm, with Cornelis Springer
