= Eduard Karsen =

Dutch painter (1860–1941)

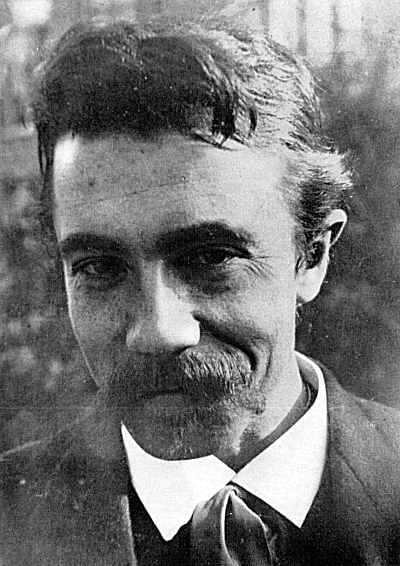
Eduard Karsen (1892); photograph by Willem Witsen.

Johann Eduard Karsen (10 March 1860, Amsterdam - 31 October 1941, Amsterdam) was a Dutch Post-Impressionist painter, known for his moody scenes featuring villages and farmhouses; usually containing a solitary figure. He was associated with the literary movement known as the "Tachtigers" (The Eighties).

== Biography ==
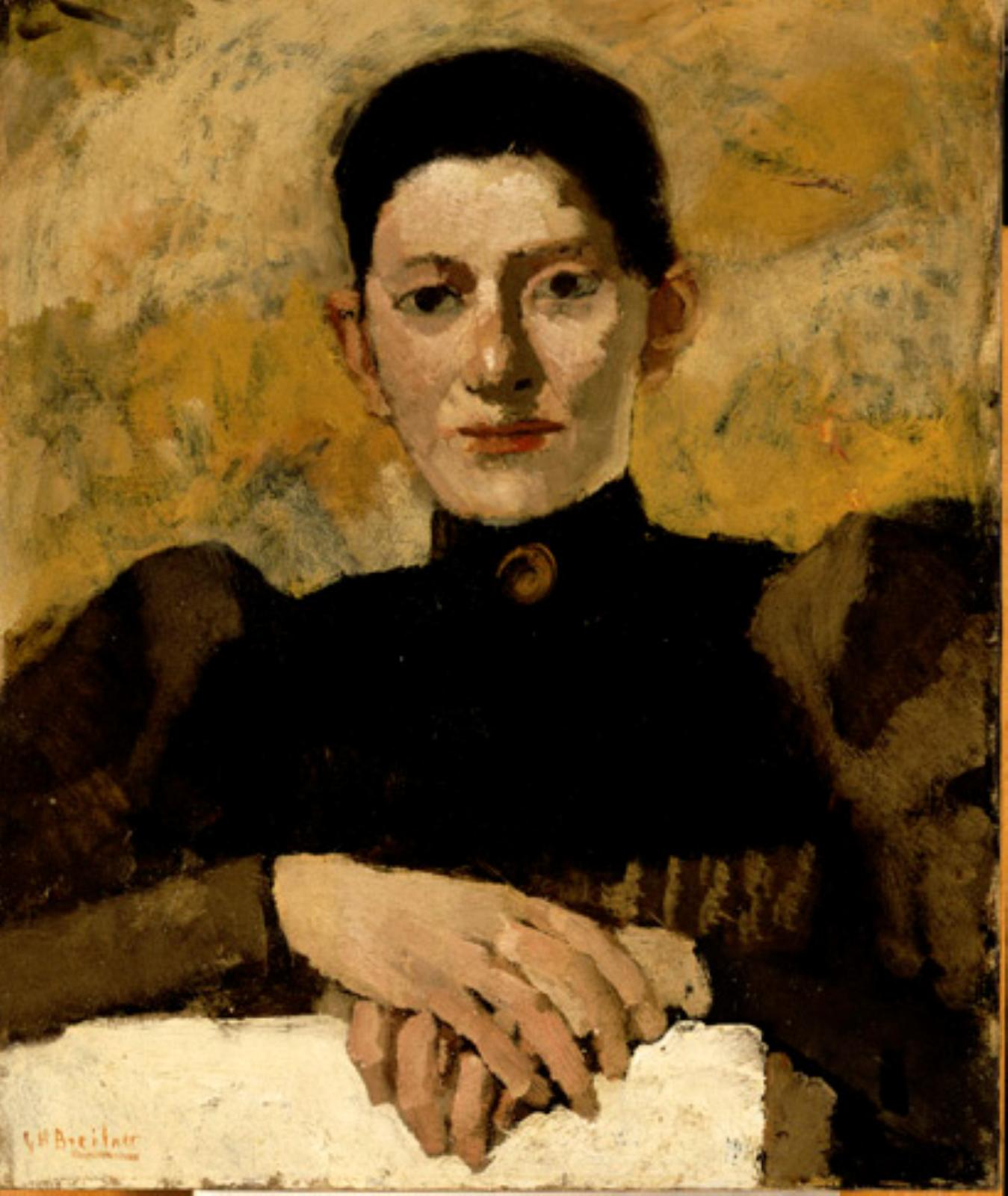
Sara de Swart, by George Hendrik Breitner

He was the son of the Romantic painter, Kaspar Karsen. After a long apprenticeship with his father, he went to study at the Rijksakademie in Amsterdam. There, he became part of an influential group of young artists that included Antoon Derkinderen, Willem Tholen, Jacobus van Looy, Jan Veth, and Jan Toorop.

In 1880, along with Toorop, Dekinderen and Willem Witsen, he became one of the founders of the "Kunstenaarsvereniging Sint Lucas", a society inspired by the Guilds of Saint Luke which represented artists in the Low Countries during the Renaissance. Through Witsen and Albert Verwey, with whom he corresponded frequently, he was introduced into the literary circles of the Tachtigers. He was also a member of Arti et Amicitiae.

The year 1888 was a major milestone in his life. That was when he found himself passionately in love with the sculptor, Saar de Swart. He wrote that he could feel a barrier between them, but was attracted to her as if by "ten magnets". As it turned out, De Swart was a lesbian. She had great sympathy for him, but made it clear that no relationship was possible. He wrote to Willem Kloos (who had also been enamored of her) that it was terrible to suffer such grief and not be a poet. The novelist Frederik van Eeden, who was also a psychiatrist, advised Karsen to visit his friend Witsen in London, as a distraction.

During this time, his feelings changed from love to resentment and, upon returning to Amsterdam, he began to slander her. She retreated to Paris. His friend, Jan Veth, tried to help resolve the quarrel by organizing a "tribunal", but was unsuccessful. Karsen never got over it and avoided all of the people who had become involved in the affair for the rest of his life.

== Selected paintings ==
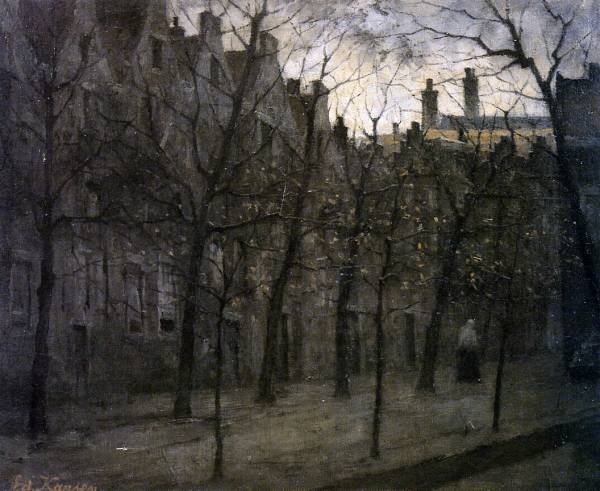
The Begijnhof in Amsterdam

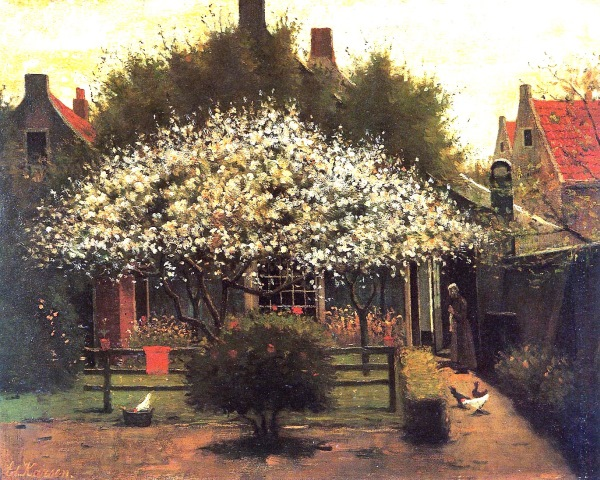
Garden with blossoming fruit trees

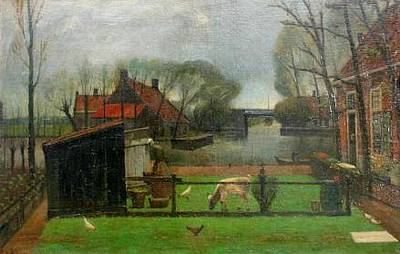
In early spring

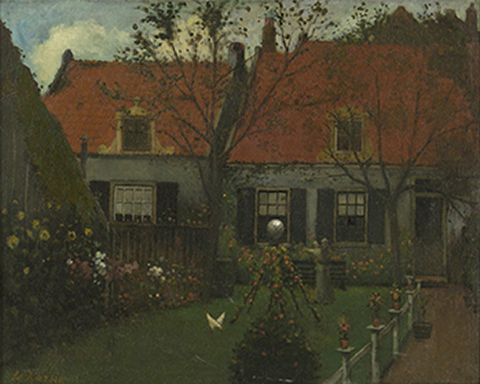
Garden mirror
