= Philip Sadée =

Dutch painter

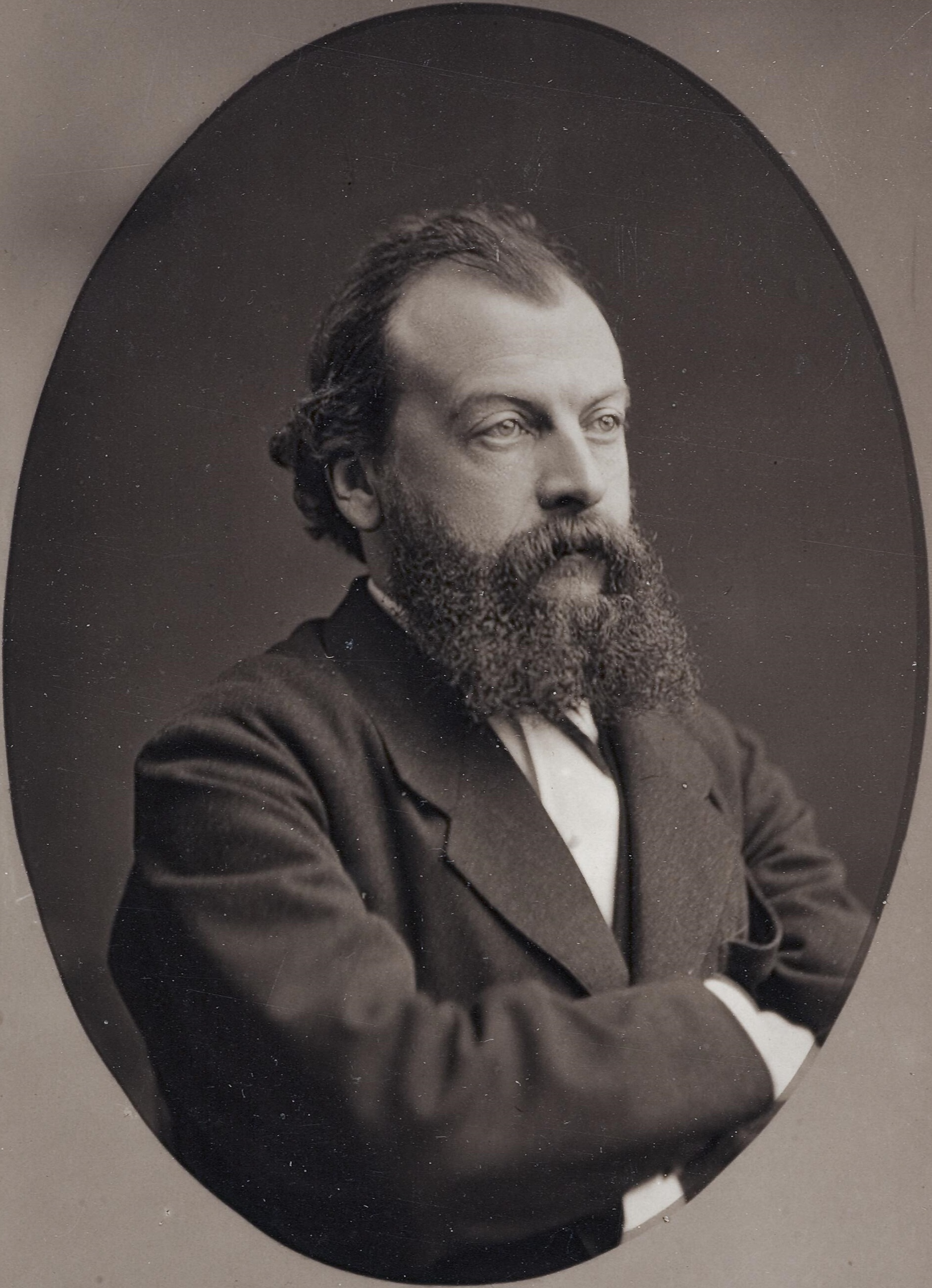
Philip Sadée (c.1890)

Philip Lodewijk Jacob Frederik Sadée (7 February 1837 The Hague – 14 December 1904 The Hague) was an artist who belonged to the Hague School.

Sadée started painting at the age of 20. He studied in The Hague both at the Academy and in the studio of J E J van den Berg (1802–1861). In 1866, with his fellow student Julius van de Sande Bakhuyzen, Sadée travelled to Düsseldorf where he studied for some months. He began painting biblical scenes and history paintings, later focusing on daily life. He came into contact with the fisherman's life while in Scheveningen. He was fascinated by and found inspiration in the beach and the dunes. Bright colors are typical of Sadée's paintings.

Sadée travelled widely, painting in the Pas de Calais and traveling through France, Germany, Belgium, and Italy. Sadée exhibited in Amsterdam, Rotterdam, and The Hague in the years 1853–1903, and was elected to the Arte et Amicitiae in Amsterdam. He taught at the Academy in The Hague and numbered Hendrikus M. Horrix (1845–1923) amongst his pupils.

== Works ==
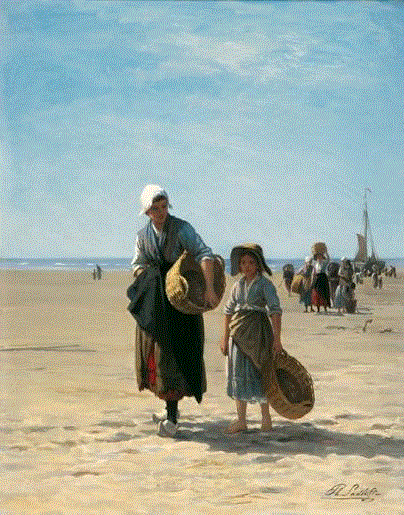
Schevening Women

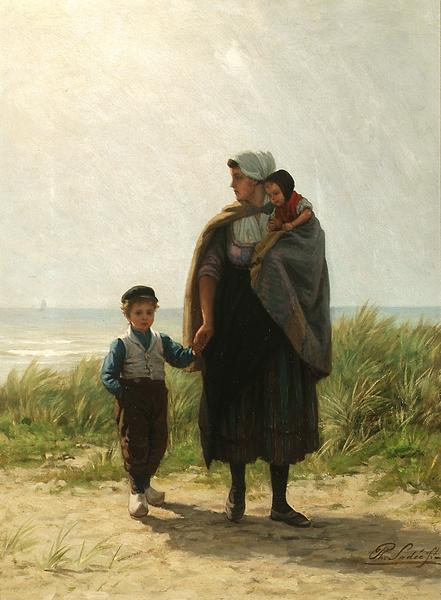
Dutch Peasants

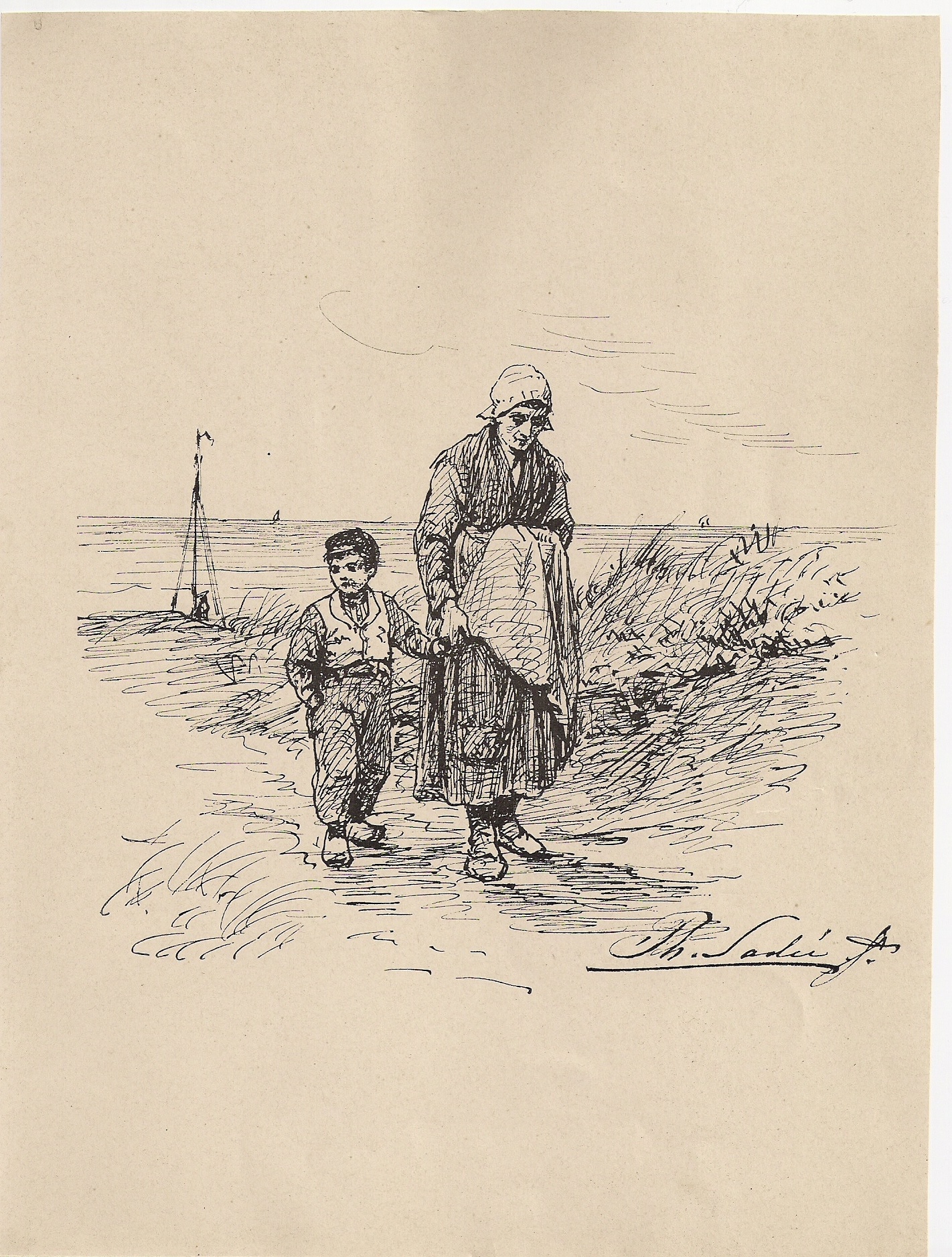
Mother and Child in the Dunes

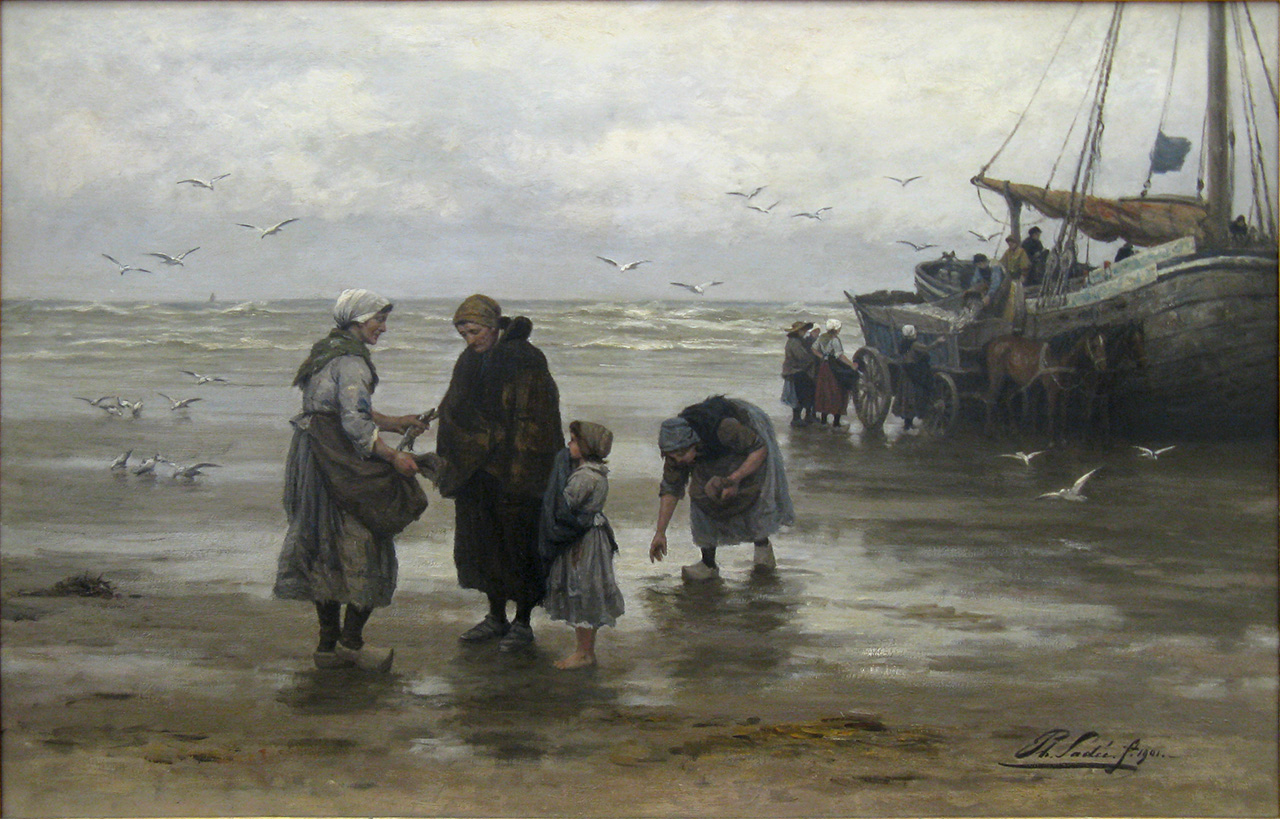
The Lot of the Poor

== Sources ==
- Dutch Wikipedia Article
- Biography at www.schilderijen-site.nl (Dutch)
