= Germ de Jong =

Dutch artist

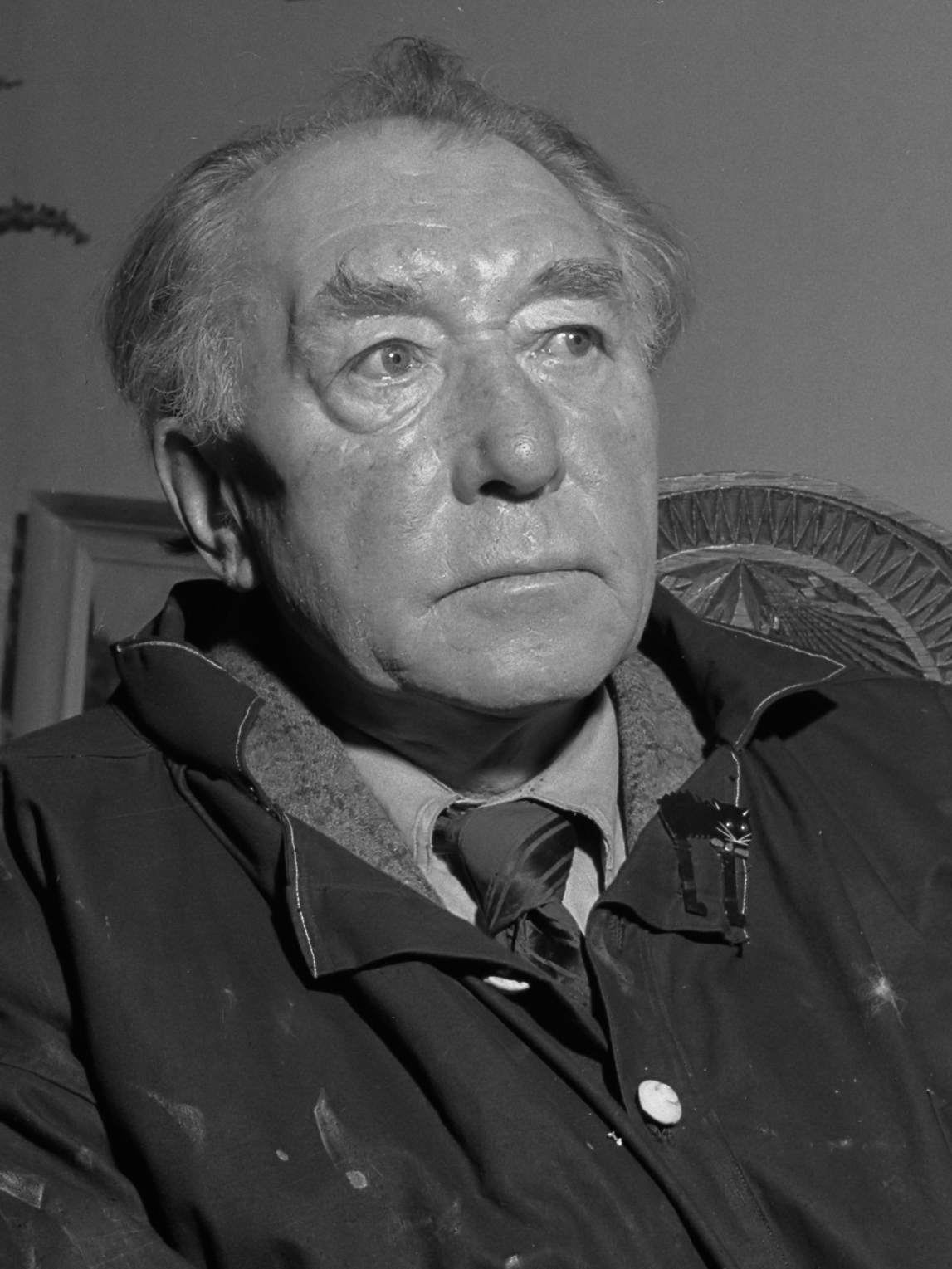
- Born: 8 March 1886; Sint Jacobiparochie, Netherlands
- Died: 11 April 1967 (aged 81); Overveen, Netherlands
- Known for: Painting

Germ de Jong (8 March 1886 – 11 April 1967) was a Dutch painter. De Jong studied art at Quellinus, a school for the poor. In 1918 de Jong had his first solo exhibition; all his works were sold within ten days. When de Jong also won the Willink van Collen award for young artists his reputation was made. De Jong moved to Paris, where he became acquainted with Picasso, Mondriaan, Jos Crion, Conrad Kickert and Simon Carmiggelt. Among de Jong’s paintings were many colourful still lifes, focusing mostly on flowers. His work was included in the 1939 exhibition and sale Onze Kunst van Heden (Our Art of Today) at the Rijksmuseum in Amsterdam.
