= Cornelis Springer =

Dutch painter

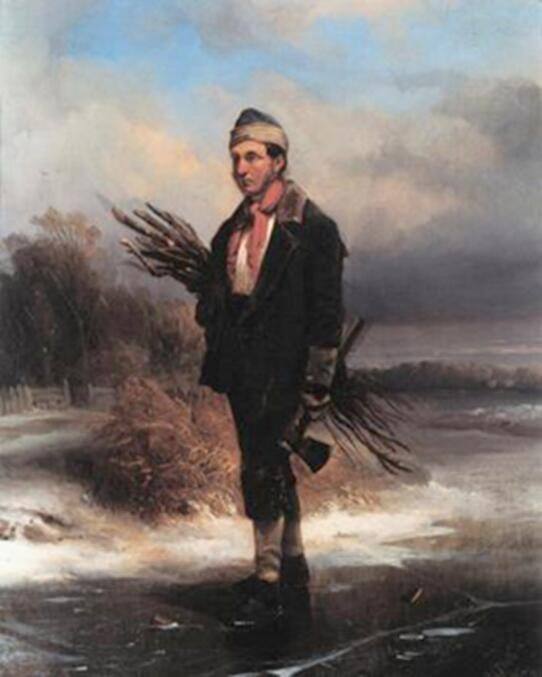
Self-portrait, as a firewood gatherer walking along a frozen canal

Cornelis Springer (Amsterdam, 25 May 1817 – Hilversum, 20 February 1891) was a Dutch 19th-century cityscape painter.

== Biography ==
Born in Amsterdam, he was a pupil of his father, the carpenter Willem Springer (1778–1857). He was a pupil of the painters Hendrik Gerrit ten Cate, Kasparus Karsen, and Jacobus van der Stok. He became a member of the Amsterdam painters collective Felix Meritis and won a gold medal for a painting of a church interior in 1847. He is known for watercolors, etchings, and drawings, especially of city views and town scenes that he sketched while traveling around the country. He was awarded the Leopold order of Belgium in 1865, and in 1878 he was invited with Jozef Israëls to advise the Dutch Ministry of Public Affairs on the plans for the Rijksmuseum.

Springer died in Hilversum in 1891.

== Paintings ==
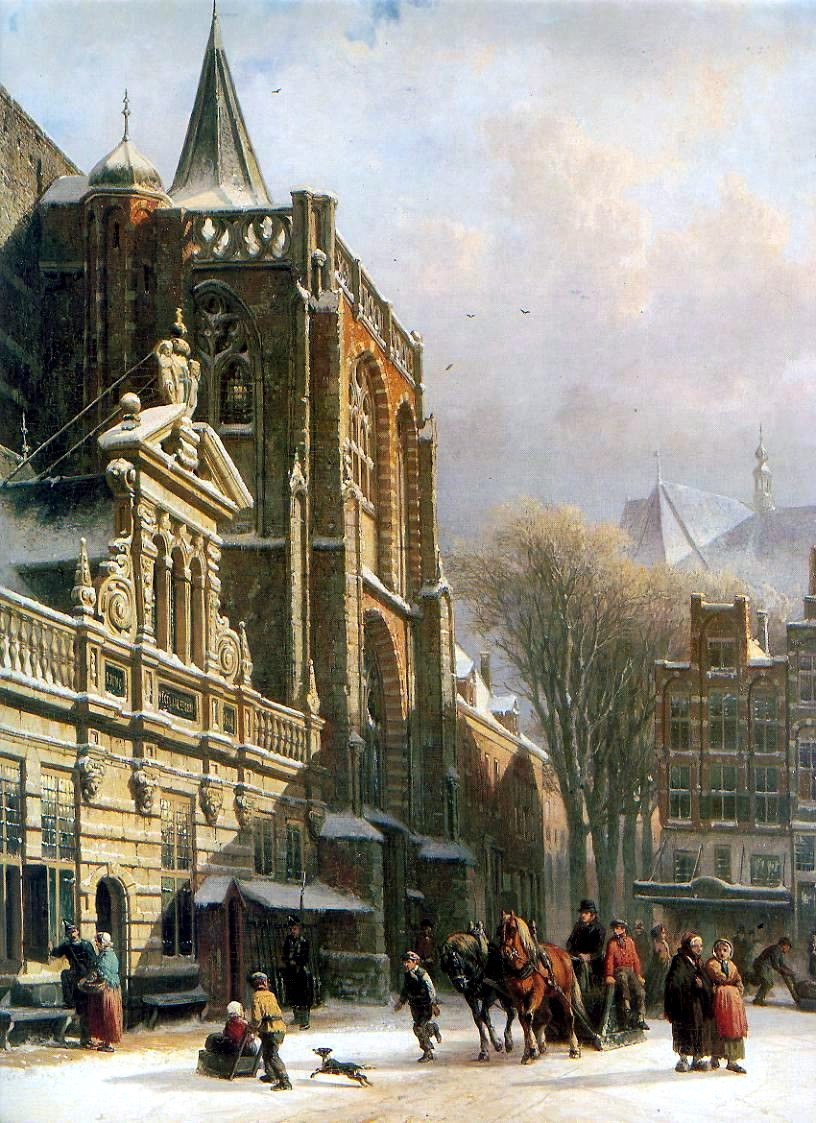
Grote of Sint-Michaëlskerk in Zwolle (1862)

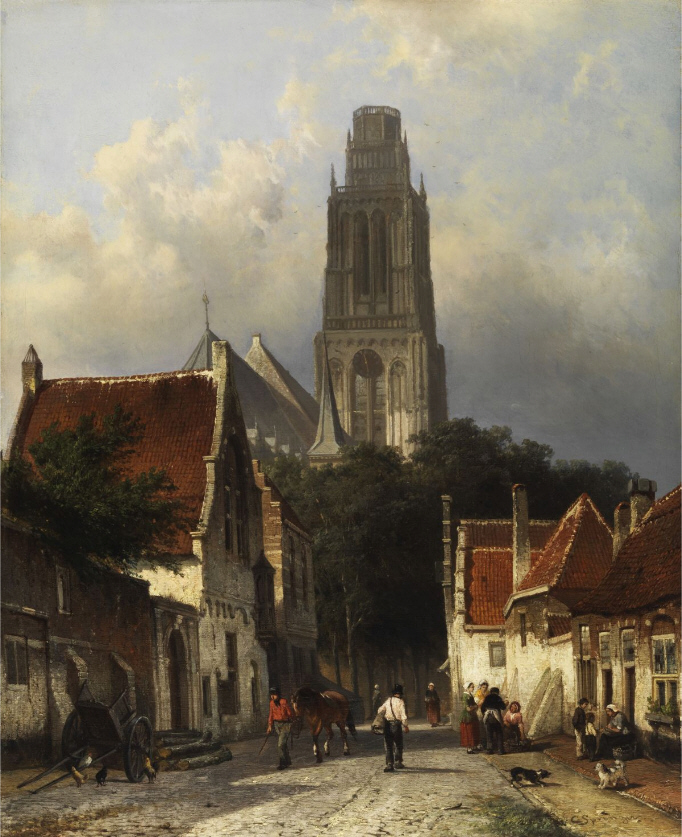
Sint-Maartenskerk, Zaltbommel

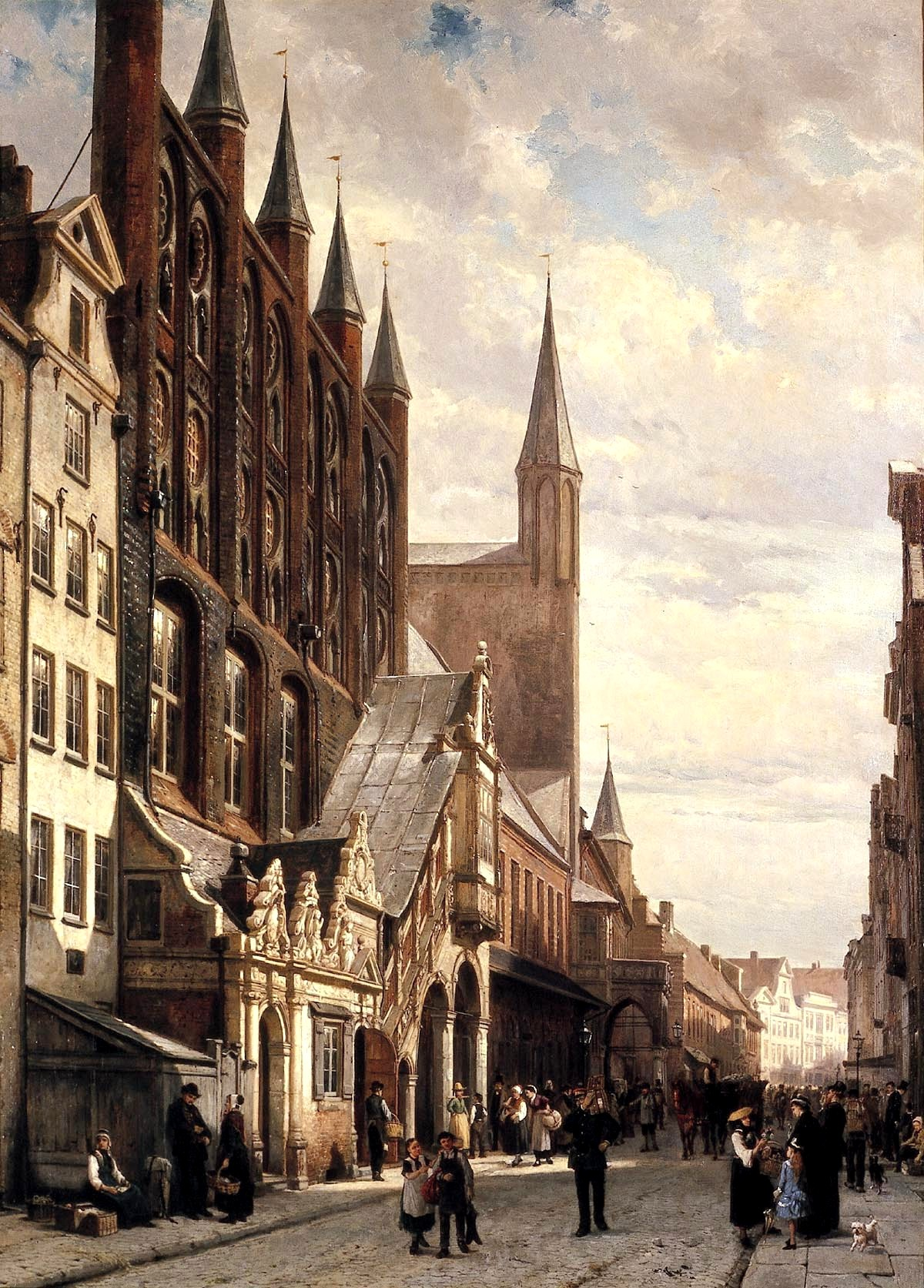
Lübeck Town Hall (1885)

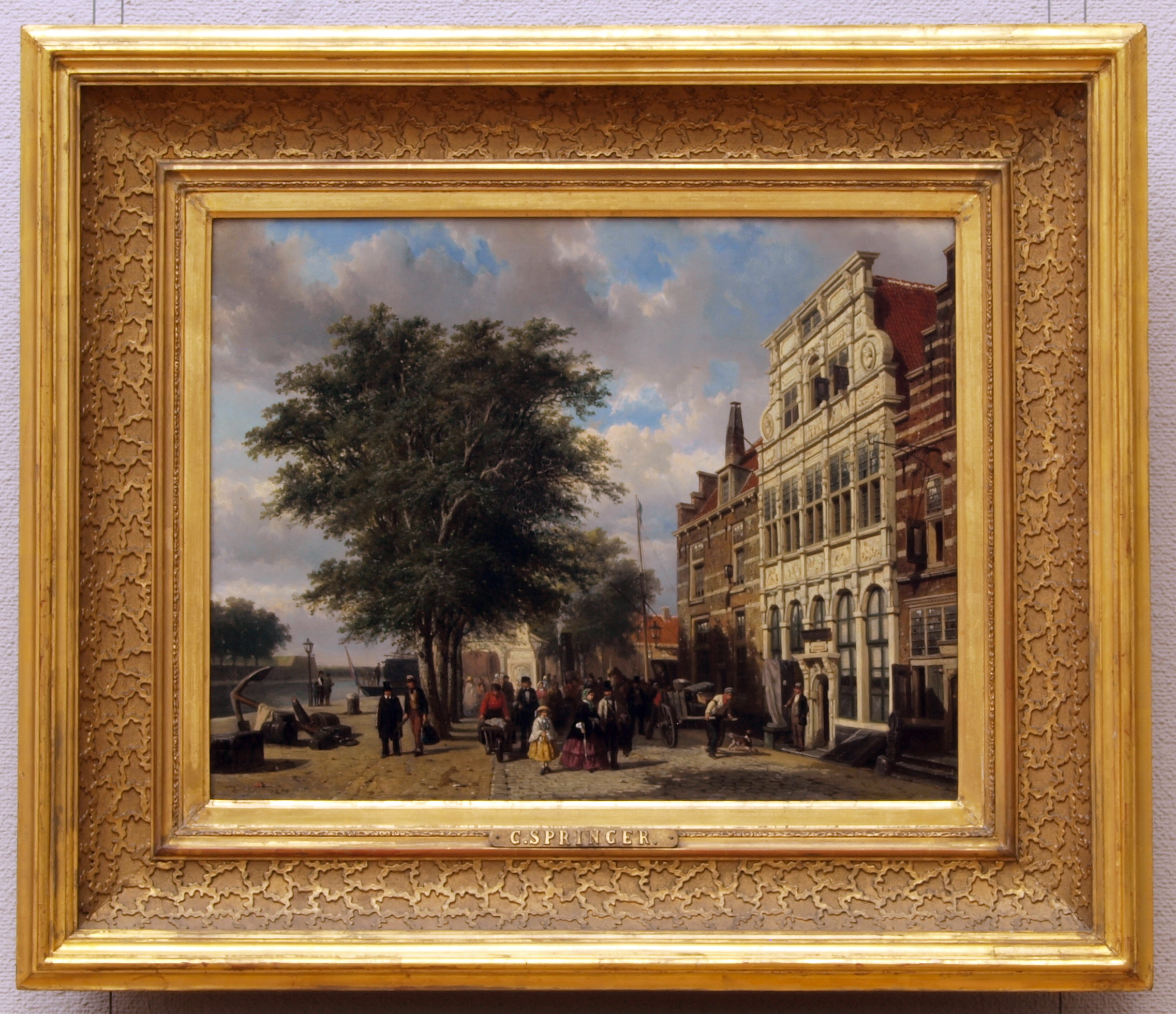
Harbor of Middelburg (1859), Teylers Museum

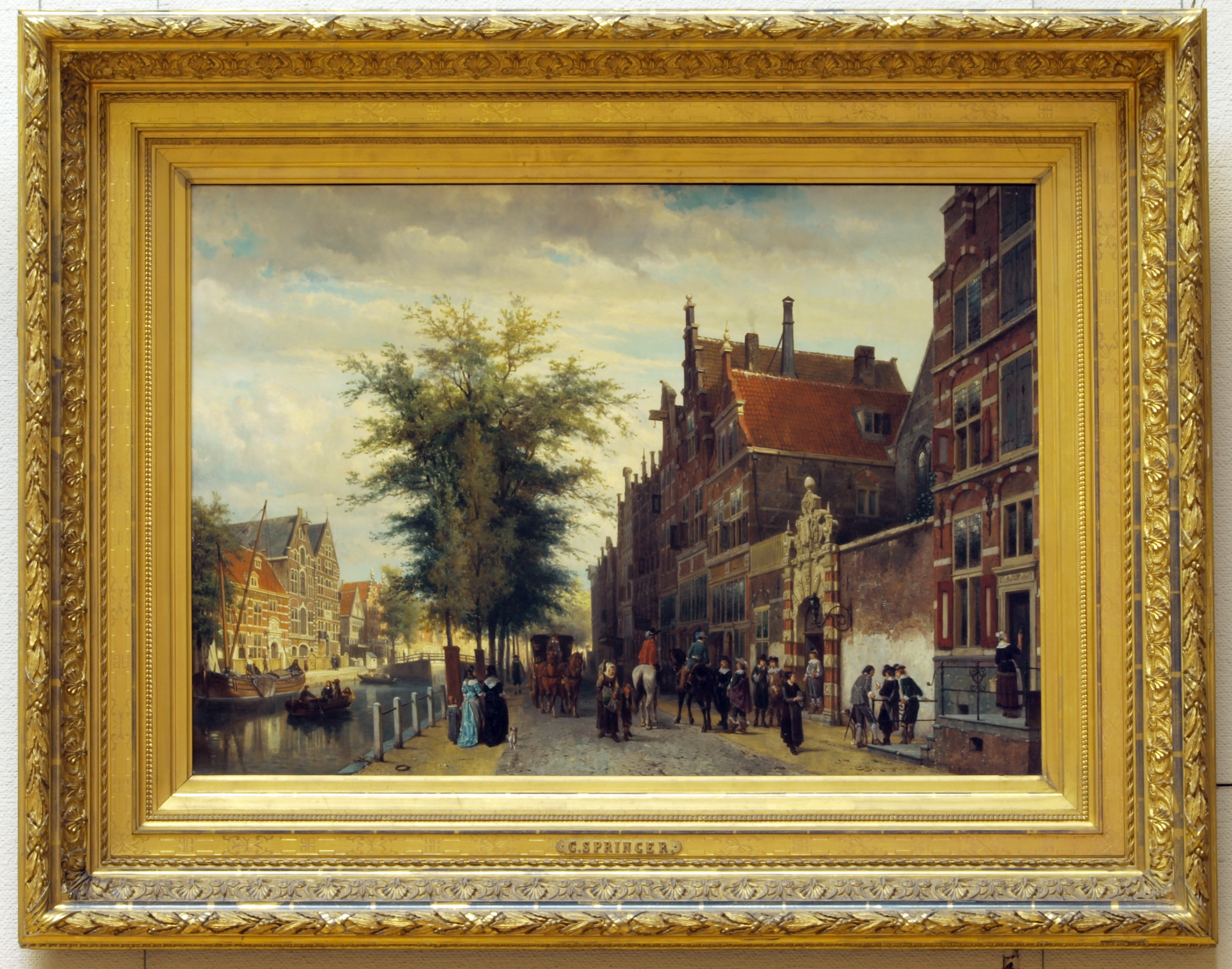
The "Atheneum Illustre" on the Oudezijds Voorburgwal in Amsterdam (1879), Teylers Museum
