= Exhibition of Living Masters =

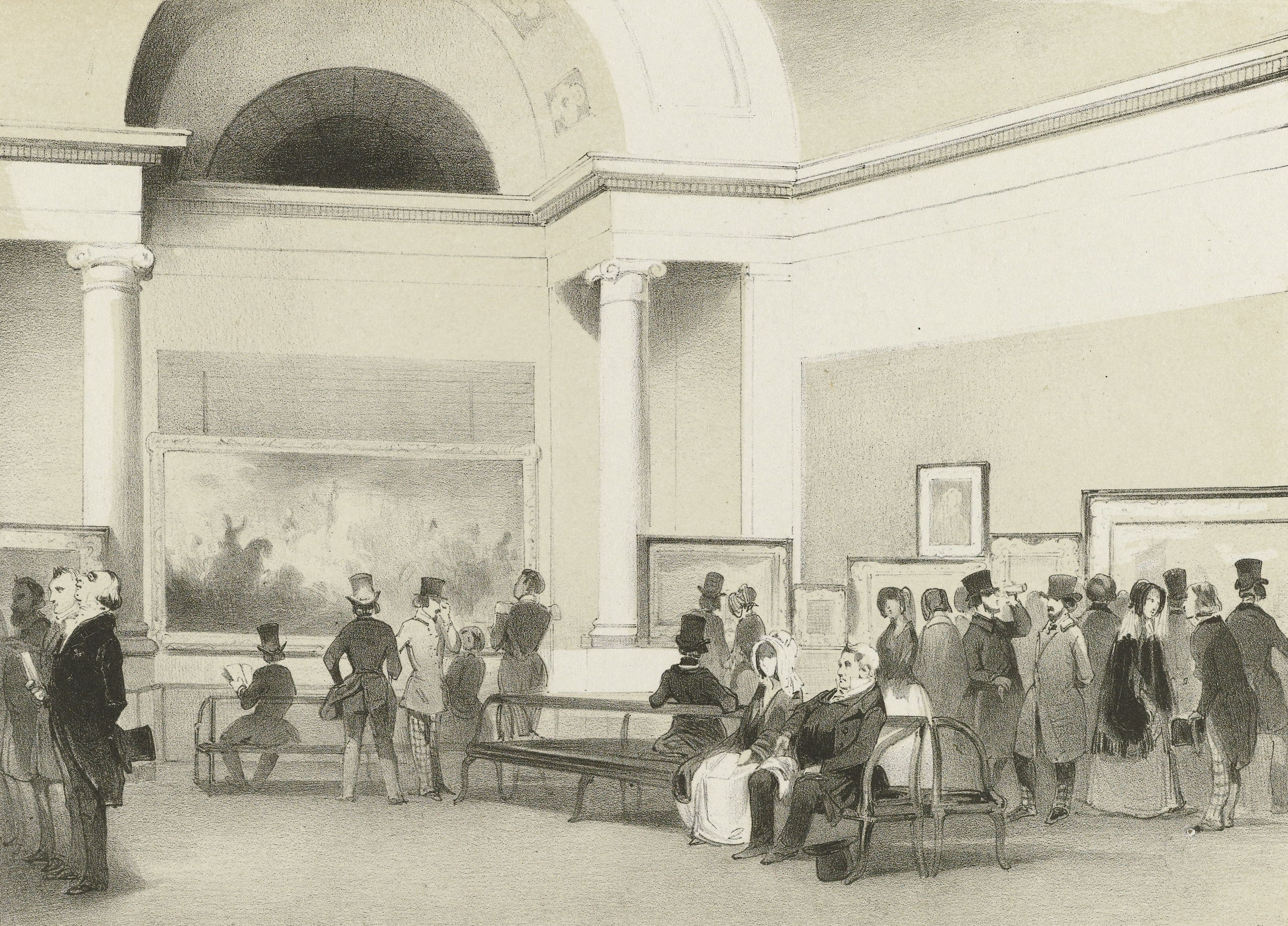
Sketch of an Exhibition held in The Hague (1845)

The Exhibition of Living Masters (Dutch: Tentoonstelling van Levende Meesters) was the name given to a series of exhibitions of contemporary art, held in various cities in the Netherlands, from 1808 to 1917.

== History ==
Louis Bonaparte, the King of Holland, took the initiative to organize the first exhibition; inspired by the Paris Salon, an exhibition that had been held annually since 1673. It was presented in the small court-martial room at the Royal Palace, on Dam Square, in Amsterdam. Originally, the plan was to hold the event annually, alternating between Amsterdam and The Hague. Later, other cities, such as 's-Hertogenbosch and Rotterdam became involved, and the frequency changed. Organization was in the hands of local committees.

Both professional and amateur artists could submit their paintings. They could also be offered for sale, without paying a commission. Women were allowed to participate, even though they could not attend any art academies until the latter part of the century. The first exhibition received 111 submissions; some anonymously. The entrants included Charles Howard Hodges, Jan Willem Pieneman, Edouard Taurel, and Johan Bernard Scheffer. Beginning in 1810, engravings, sculptures, and medals could also be submitted.

In the 1820s, professional artists began to complain that the presence of amateurs was a threat to their livelihood. As a result, submission standards were amended, requiring works to have "genoegzame kunstwaarde" (sufficient artistic value). In the 1850s, the first photographs (daguerreotypes) were submitted. More protests followed, so many were refused or removed.

Nevertheless, the overall requirements remained general enough to allow many young artists a chance to have their débuts at the Exhibition; including Jan Hoynck van Papendrecht (1884), Isaac Israëls (1881), Taco Mesdag (1849), and Maurits Verveer (1851). From 1840, foreign artists were allowed to participate and, from 1860, gold and silver medals were awarded.

The final exhibition was held at the Rotterdam Academy in 1917. World War I had created serious financial and organizational problems. After the war, no attempt was made to continue. In 1932, the term "Living Masters" was used in connection with an exhibition at the Stedelijk Museum Amsterdam, but it was an unrelated event.

A catalogue was made for each exhibition, containing an overview of the submitted artworks and participating artists. The catalogues have been digitized by the Netherlands Institute for Art History.

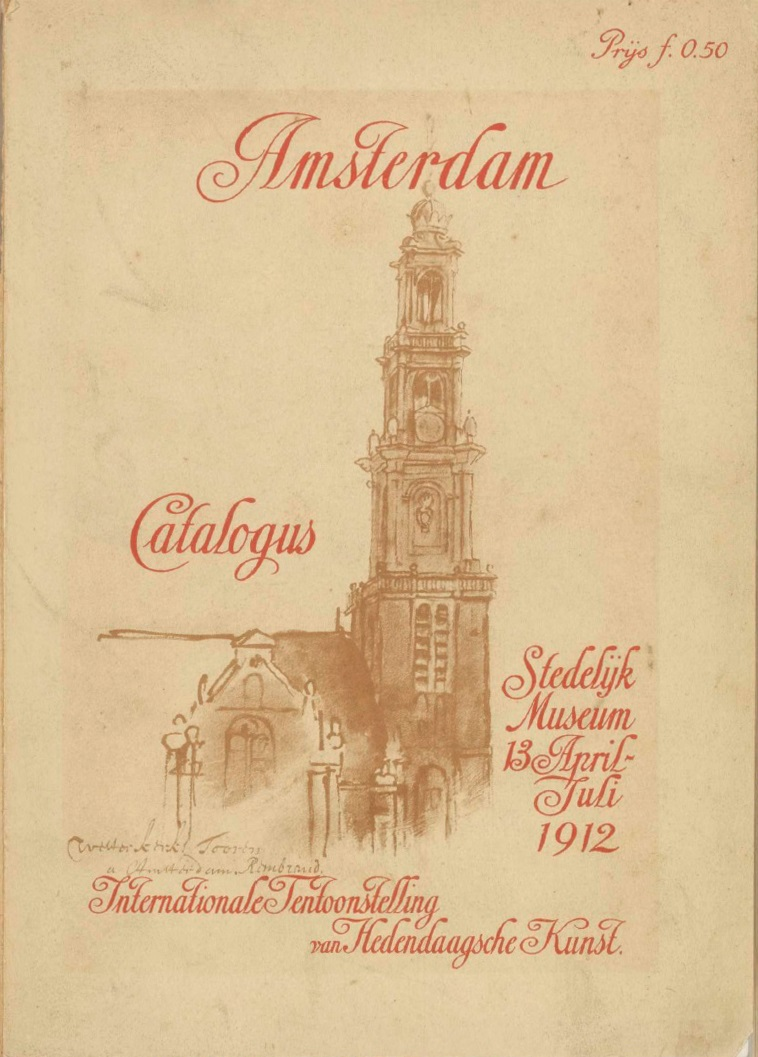
Catalogue from 1912
