= Anton Heyboer =

Dutch painter

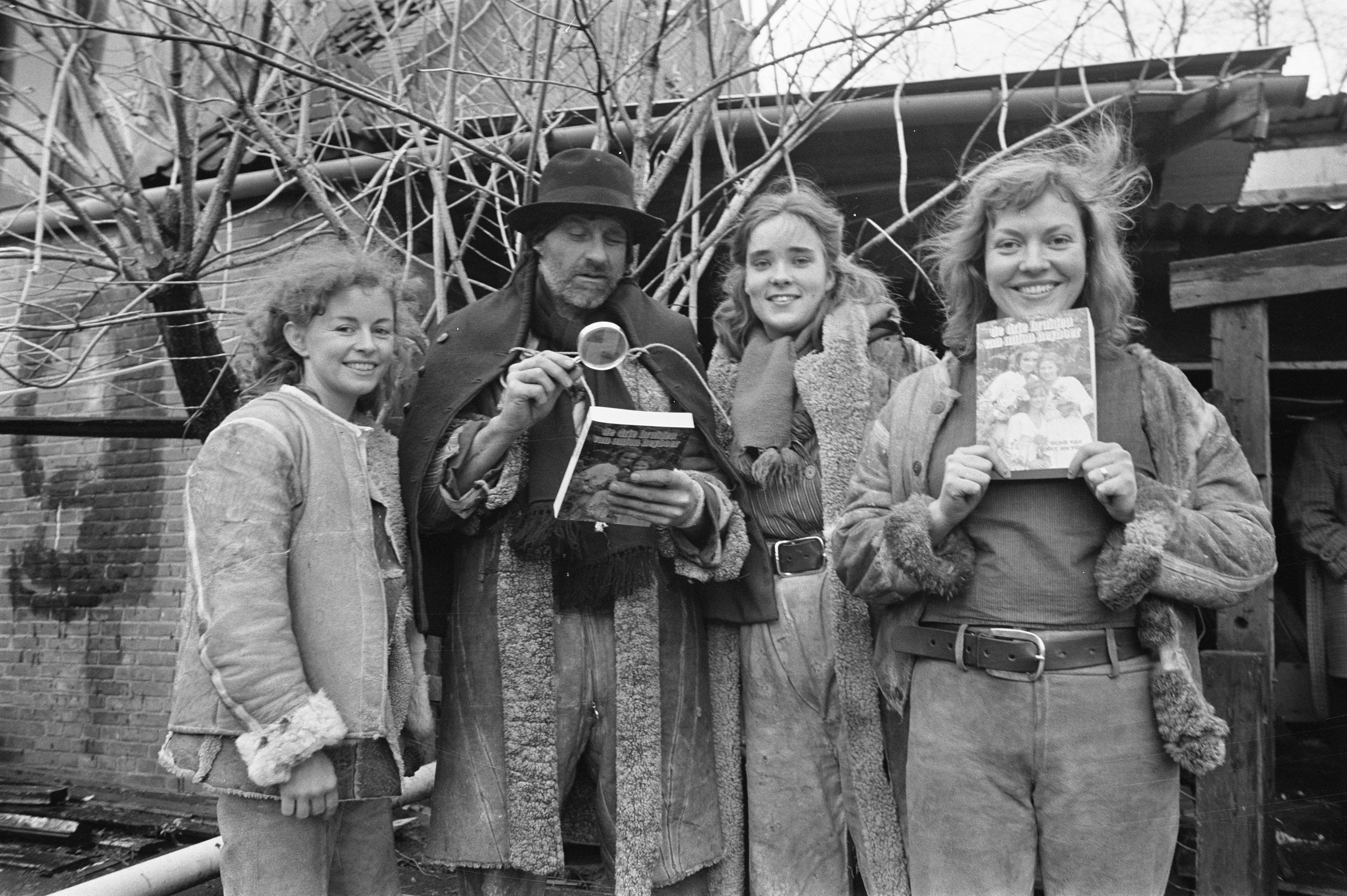
- Anton Heyboer and his brides Lottie, Marike, and Maria in 1974
- Born: 9 February 1924; Sabang, Dutch East Indies
- Died: 9 April 2005 (aged 81); Den Ilp, Netherlands

Anton Heyboer (Dutch pronunciation: [ˈɑntɔn ˈɦɛibuːr]; 9 February 1924 – 9 April 2005) was a Dutch painter and printmaker.

== Biography ==
According to the informational booklet "Anton Heyboer: Timeless Work", he was born on the small island of Pulau Weh in the north of Sumatra as the son of a Dutch mechanical engineer and a school teacher. His father worked in the coal harbour there for Shell Oil and his mother worked in the local school for Dutch children. The care of the young baby was in the hands of "Baboe Jami", a nurse who only cared for Heyboer for 5 months, but whose warmth would remain a fond memory for the rest of his life and would influence his later work as his ideal of the "original woman".

The family travelled wherever Shell needed his father, and they lived in Curaçao during the years 1933-1938. Anton Heyboer was trained to become a mechanical engineer like his father. In 1939 the family took a vacation in the Netherlands, but due to the outbreak of WWII they could not return to Curaçao and settled in Voorburg, where Anton went to work for the company "Van der Heem" in The Hague.

=== Haarlem ===
In 1942 the family moved to Haarlem, where they lived on the Zijlweg and young Anton began studying to become a technical draughtsman, but was awarded a diploma for unusual aptitude after only three months and began working for his uncle Paasman who supplied hydraulic pumps for the local Figee Crane Company. He worked there in the draughtsmen's studio with large windows on the south side for light.

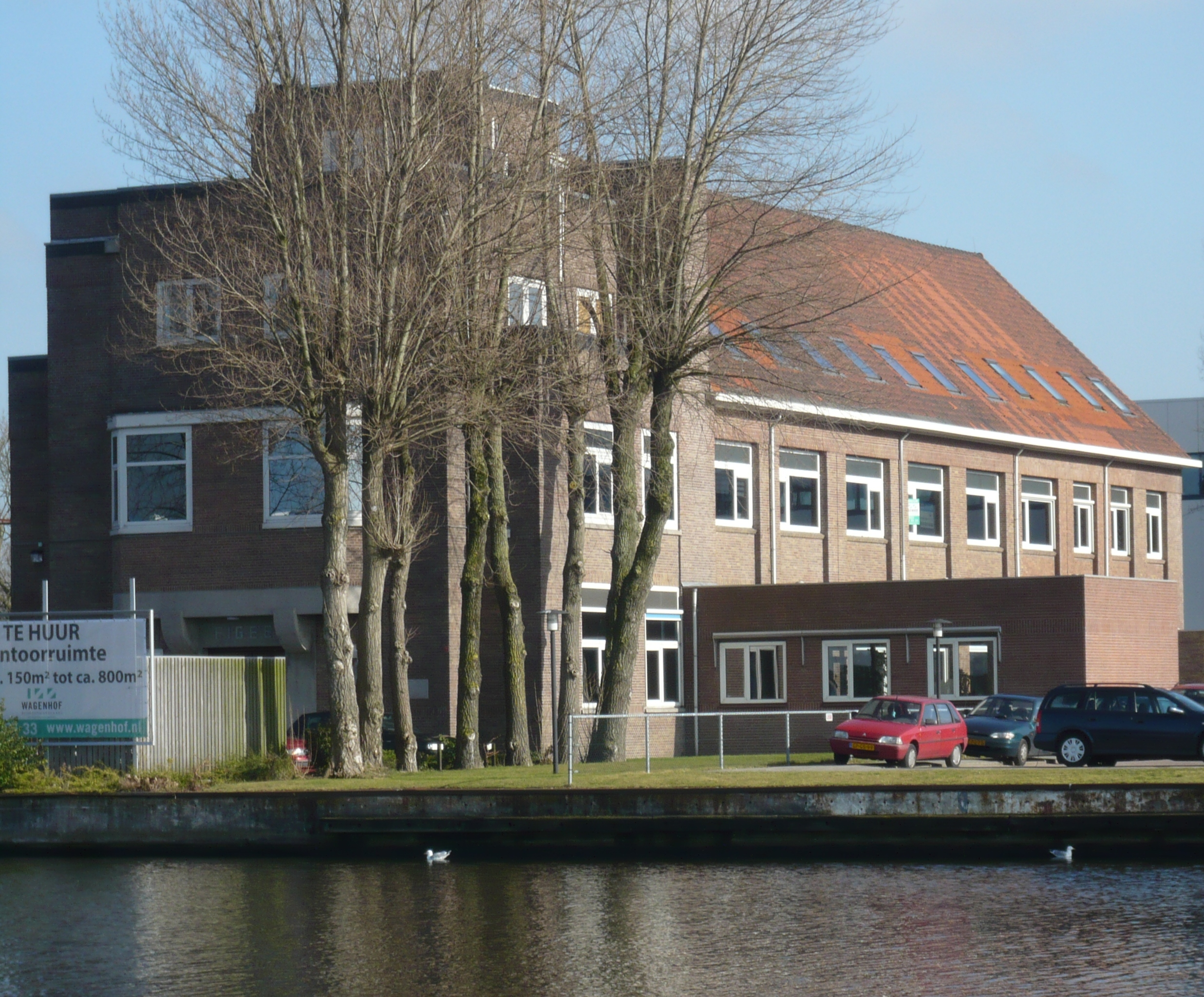
South side of the former head office of Figee on the Spaarne river, which took a bomb during WWII above the draughtsmen's studio (the color difference can still be seen in the orange roof tiles)

==== Berlin ====
In 1943 he was conscripted for work service in Germany and spent seven months in the labor camp of Prenzlauer Berg in Berlin, where he became seriously ill, an episode that would have strong influence on his later art.

=== Haarlem war years: First works ===
After seven months he returned to Haarlem where he lived with his parents until the end of the war. When their house was destroyed for the "Festung Haarlem" in 1944, they moved to the Lorenzkade, and Anton assisted his father building "noodkachels" (emergency stoves). During the Hunger Winter Anton supplemented the family income by selling some works; he made signboards for local businesses in town and printed posters and cartoons.

==== Work with Drenthe painters ====
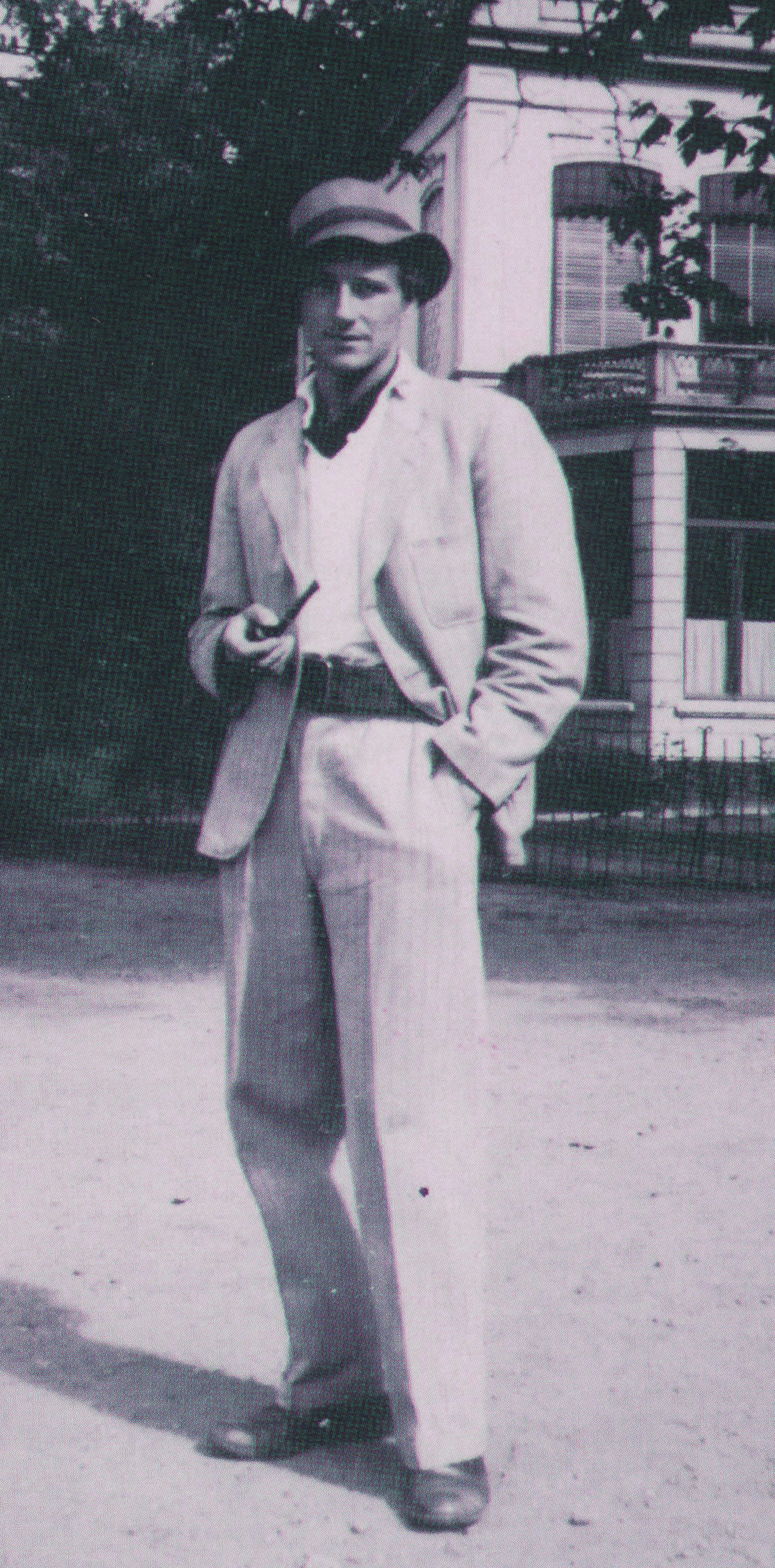
Anton Heyboer in 1946 on the Dreef in Haarlem wearing a suit he bought from the proceeds of his first art show in Assen

After the war in the fall of 1945 he moved to Borger, Netherlands where he met and moved in with Hans Heyting in 1946. According to Heyting's biographer, Heyboer had come to Borger after being inspired by reading the letters of Theo and Vincent van Gogh and wanted to come to Drenthe to see the countryside himself. Heyboer was so popular with women that they needed to put an alarm near the entrance of the "Groene Kruis" house they were painting in, in order to keep girlfriends from walking in unannounced. He helped start the club ”Vereniging Drentse schilders” and began painting intensively. After a year the place became known as "Rembrandtplein". In 1946 Heyboer's work was shown with that of the other "Drentse schilders" in Assen.

==== Trip to France ====
In Borger Anton met the painter Jan Kagie, who influenced his art when he took him along on a trip to France in 1947. Anton returned north after 3 months when he ran out of money. At first he moved in with his parents, but their marriage was deteriorating, so he quickly decided to find his own place to live.

=== Haarlem period ===
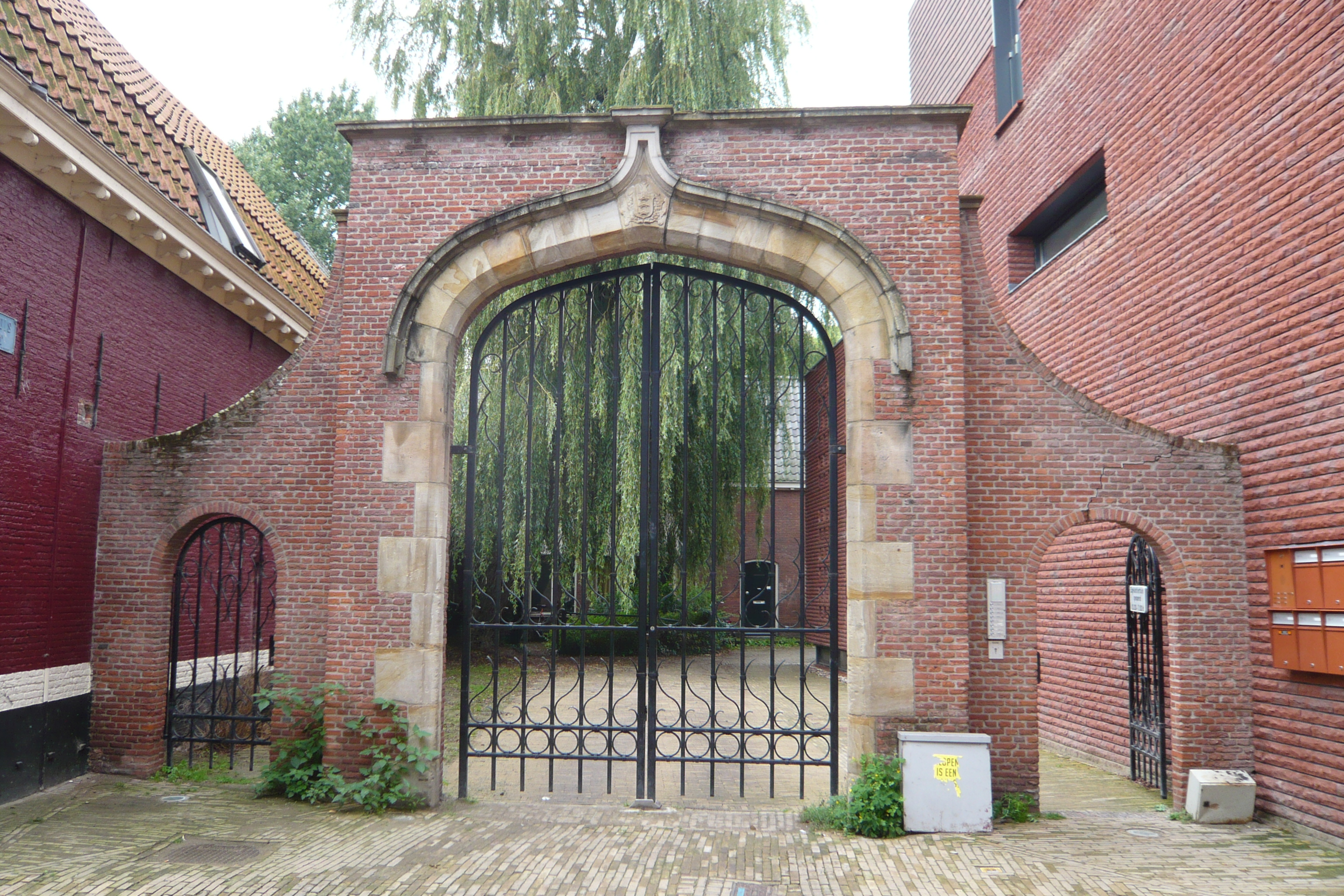
Old gate of the St. Elisabeth Gasthuis - the path leads to the Zonnesteeg, where Anton first lived with Elsa and Josef Santen

In 1948 he moved in with his friend Nol van Gilst who was living in a rundown on the Zonnesteeg 2a (since demolished) in Haarlem. Van Gilst gave him a small shoe leather press, with which Anton began to make etchings. In 1949 Nol moved out and Anton remained. First the painter Josef Santen moved in, and later the woman who became his first wife, Elsa Wijnands, who also brought six cats. In 1949 Anton held his first exhibition together with the painter Jan Kagie in "Het Luifeltje", and he was seen from that moment as a true artist by the city of Haarlem and became eligible for the SBBK subsidy from 1950 to 1958. His parents divorced that year and in the spring of 1950 Anton married Elsa (Puk). His witnesses were Henri Frédéric Boot and Josef Santen. This first marriage was Anton's initial attempt at free love and it added too much stress. Anton's mental state deteriorated in the course of that autumn and in the winter he was first hospitalized in the hospital behind his house to convalesce, though he later felt he needed psychoanalysis.

==== Nervous breakdown ====
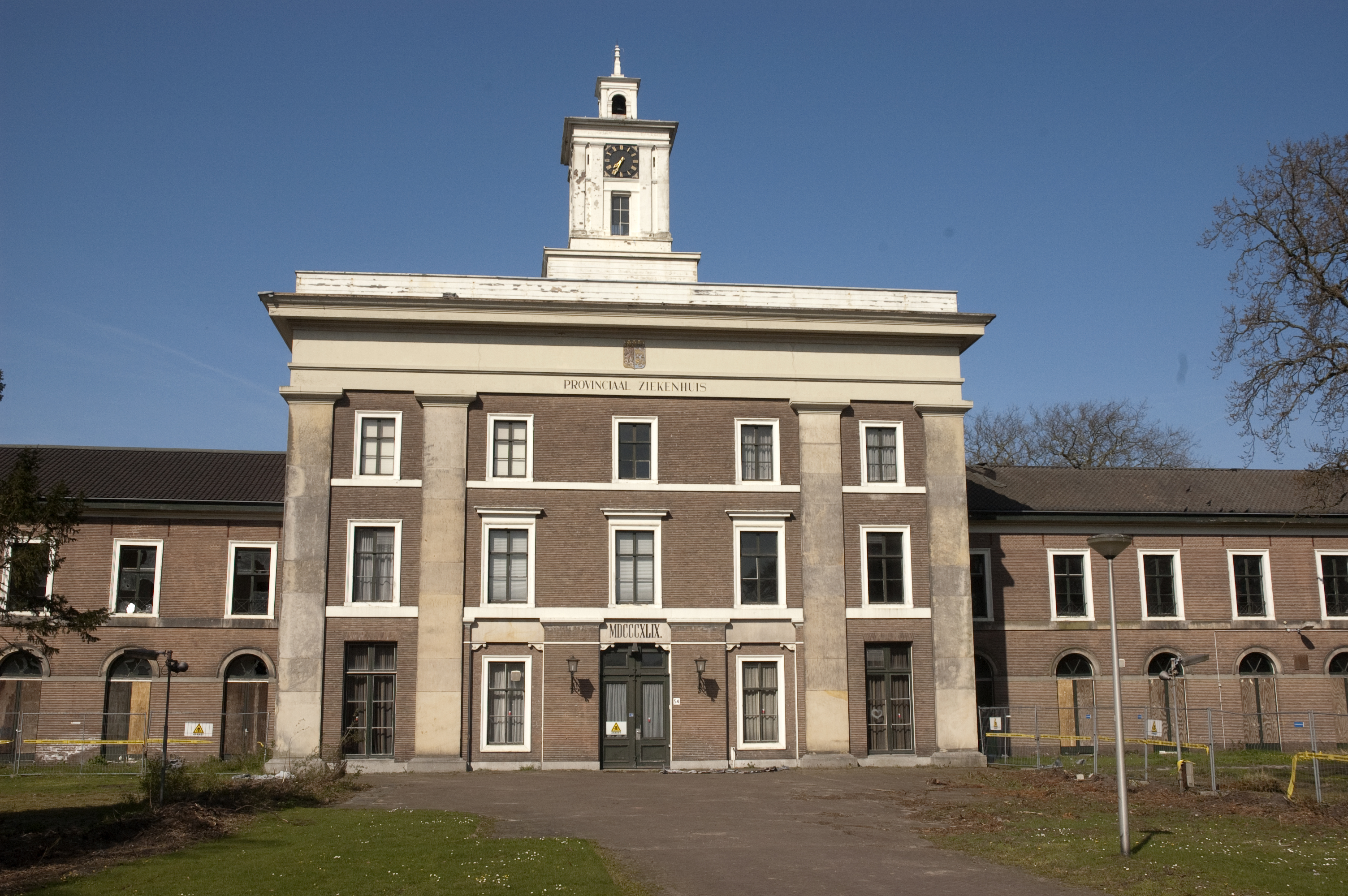
Provinciaal Ziekenhuis Meer en Berg, the psychiatric hospital where Anton was treated for 4 months in January–April 1951

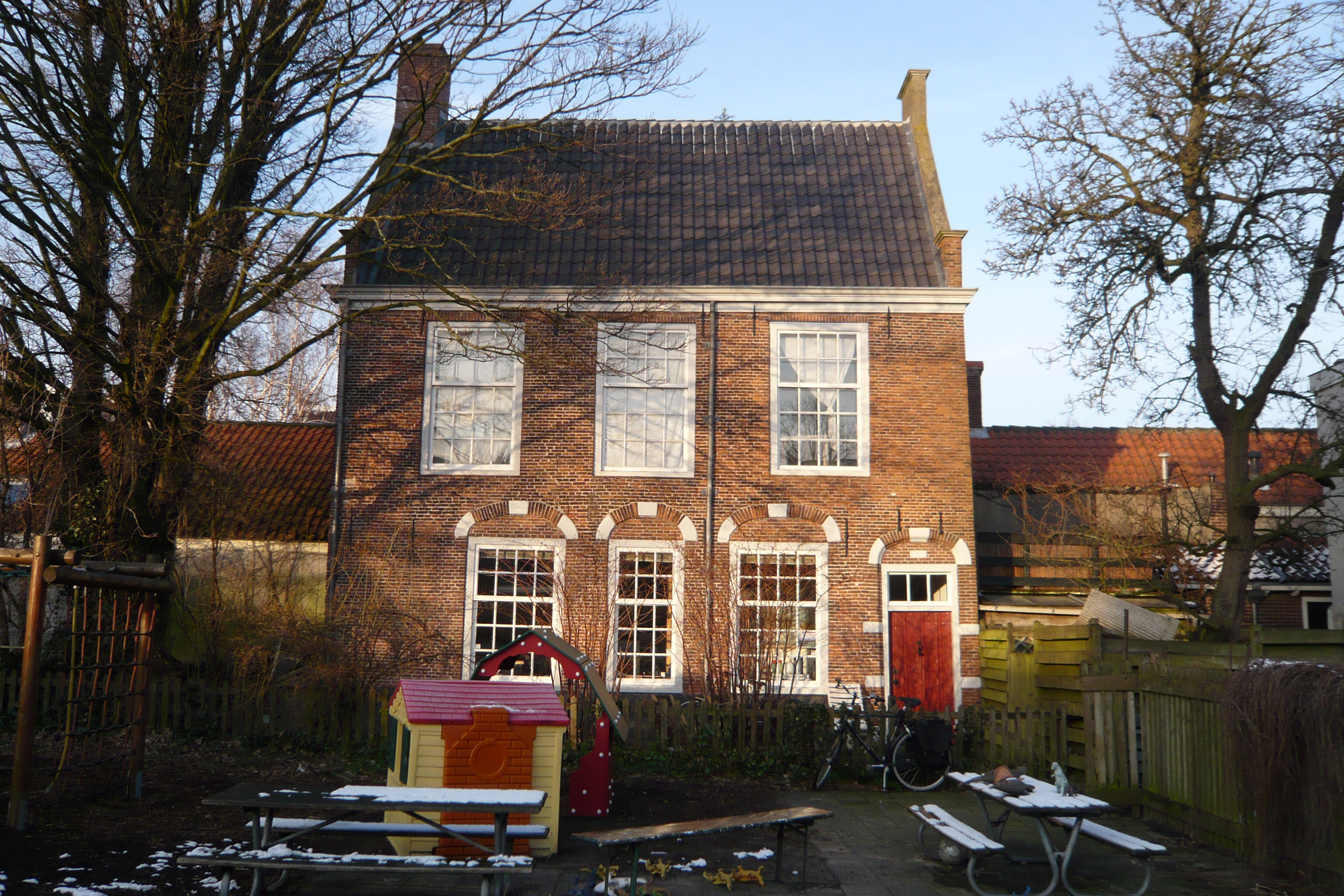
"Paradijsje" - this was the place where the Teisterbant club met in the summer months and where Anton worked in the 1950s after being released from hospital

In 1951 Heyboer was so struck by a dying cat that he was overcome with feelings of loneliness and felt he needed psychiatric treatment. In January he admitted himself to the Psychiatric Hospital in Santpoort. He was diagnosed with a "Christus complex". This period was another important turning point in his development as an artist, and it was after this period that he developed his "System" for showing others the "innocence" of their lives. He was only allowed out of the hospital if he had a place to live, and he found a sponsor in the art dealer Pieter Leffelaar and the writer Godfried Bomans who organized living space for him at "Het Paradijsje", and a position as barkeeper at Teisterbant. Teisterbant was an art society, that Godfried had founded in 1949, which met in the basement of a café on the Grote Markt, Haarlem. In the summer the club met in the garden of Paradijsje, and Anton and Elsa took boating trips to IJmuiden, where Anton romanticized the "freedom of the sea" and attempted to live completely independently by fishing, collecting leftovers from the eel smokeries and bartering his works for other goods and services with friends, fishermen, and members of the Teisterbant circle. In the spring of 1951 Anton helped form a new arts group called De Groep that split off from Kunst zij ons doel. The KZOD board was upset because they lost most of their young members and started a committee to coax the members of 'De Groep' back and these talks were also held in the meeting hall of Teisterbant. In December 1952 Anton had an exhibition of his work with others from 'De Groep' at the Huis van Looy on the Kleine Houtweg. His bohemian lifestyle ended when Anton and Elsa's son Andries was born in August 1952.

==== Klein Heiligland ====
Heyboer moved with Elsa and Andries to Klein Heiligland 1, the printshop of his brother-in-law Ger Henkes. On the Klein Heiligland he made etchings and plaster sculptures and was visited by Bomans and artists from his Haarlem Teisterbant circle.

In the spring of 1953 Anton met the 16-year-old Erna Kramer. They fell in love, and Anton introduced her almost immediately to his friend Godfried and then moved his studio into a shed behind her parents house. Anton had long conversations with Godfried Bomans about Catholicism, but in September 1953 the Bomans left for a year in Rome and Anton spent the winter making etchings and working on his "System", based on the numbers 1-9 from the Kabbalah. That fall Elsa decided to divorce him and moved back with Andries to her parents house. Anton Heyboer had to leave Henkes printshop and took shelter a few doors down in the attic of Henri Boot, where he set up a workshop and called himself "Mari".

In 1954 he bought a boat with Erna called the "La Mar Sancta Cruz Pescadore". Anton's behavior caused a scandal at the time. Boot himself was also a controversial figure. He gave lessons and received artists in two conjoined houses on the Klein Heiligland that according to period accounts, were filthy and infested with rats. Despite his lifestyle, or perhaps because of it, he had many registered students, such as Josef Santen, Jules Chapon (who worked across the street), Wim Steyn, Poppe Damave, Otto B. de Kat and Kees Verwey. According to Erna who lived with him there, their closest friends were Godfried and his wife Pietsie, Harry Mulisch and his wife Rieks, Frans Verpoorten and his wife Emmy, Willem Leonard Brugsma, Jules Chapon and his wife Polly. In 1956 Anton married Erna after becoming Catholic to please her parents. Godfried helped him become Catholic and he and Harry were their witnesses at the wedding. Their daughter Marcelle was born 9 juli 1957, and that September an exhibition in Galerie Espace led to the purchase of Heyboer's works by the Stedelijk Museum, the MOMA and the Brooklyn Museum of Art. This launched his career as an artist and in 1958 he wrote to the city of Haarlem to inform them that he would no longer be sending them works for consideration for the SBBK commission.

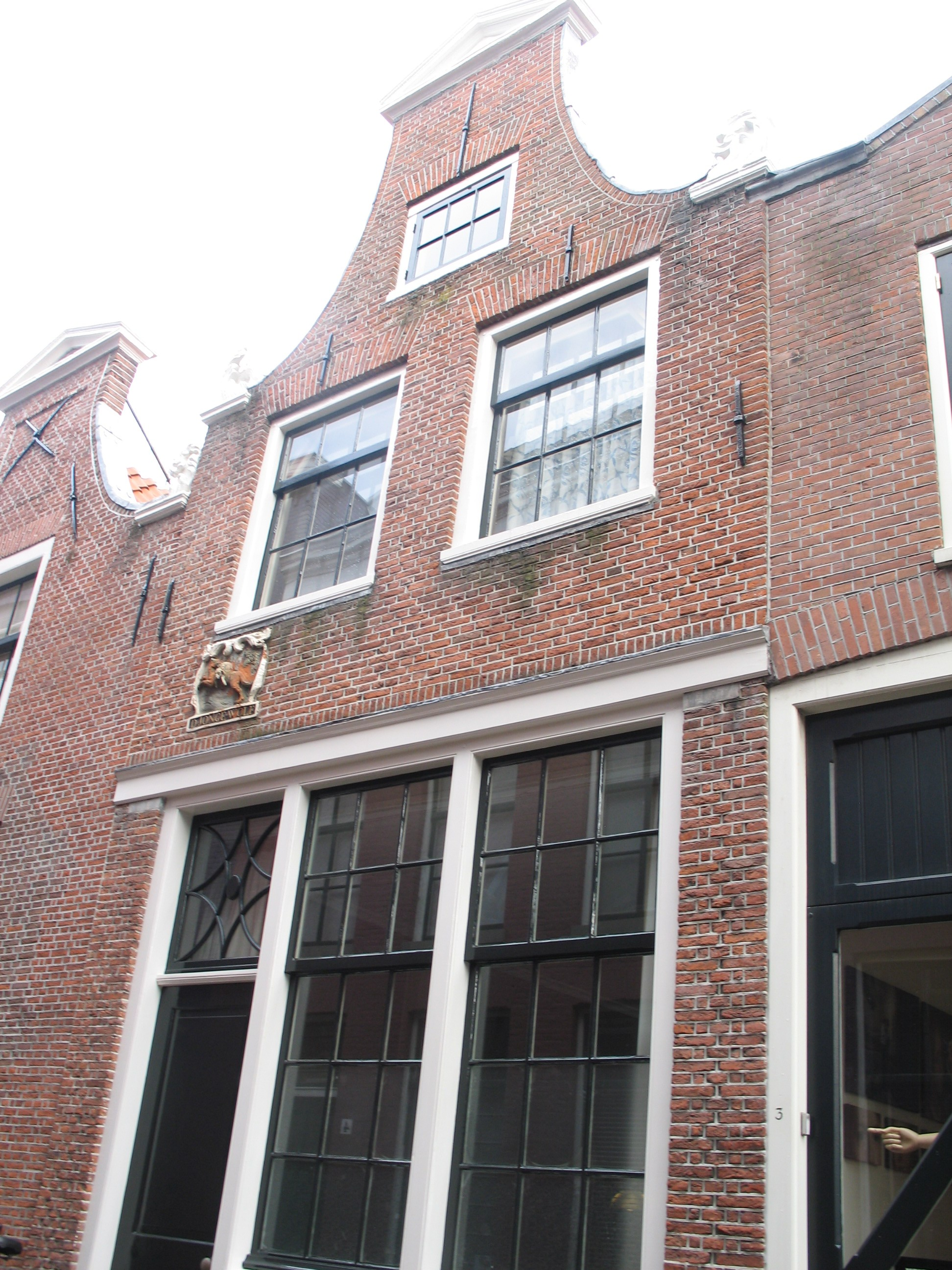
Klein Heiligland 1A, with the sign of the "young wolf", printshop where Heyboer lived and worked from 1952 to 1953.

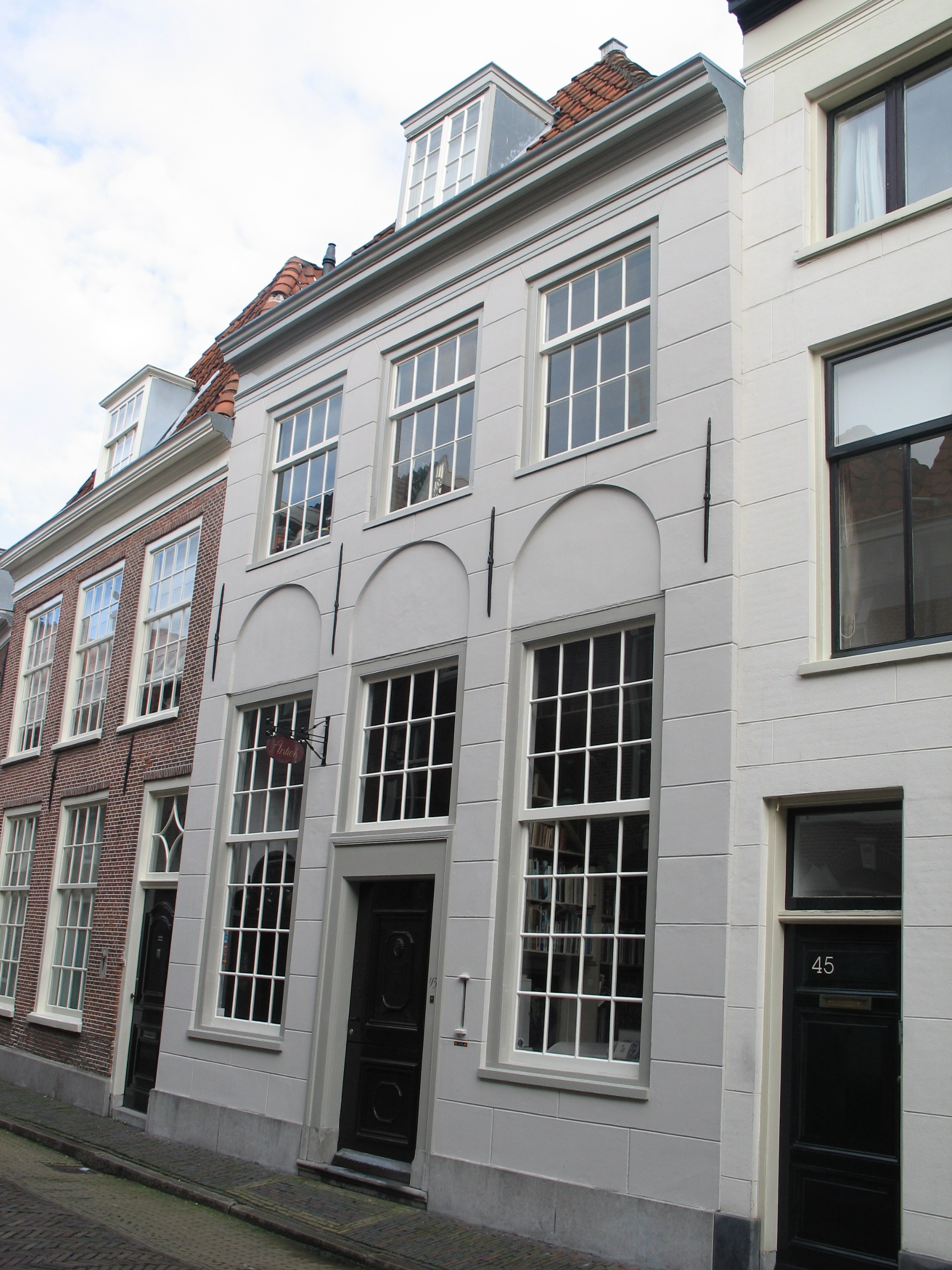
Klein Heiligland 43, former home and studio of the painter Henri Frédéric Boot.

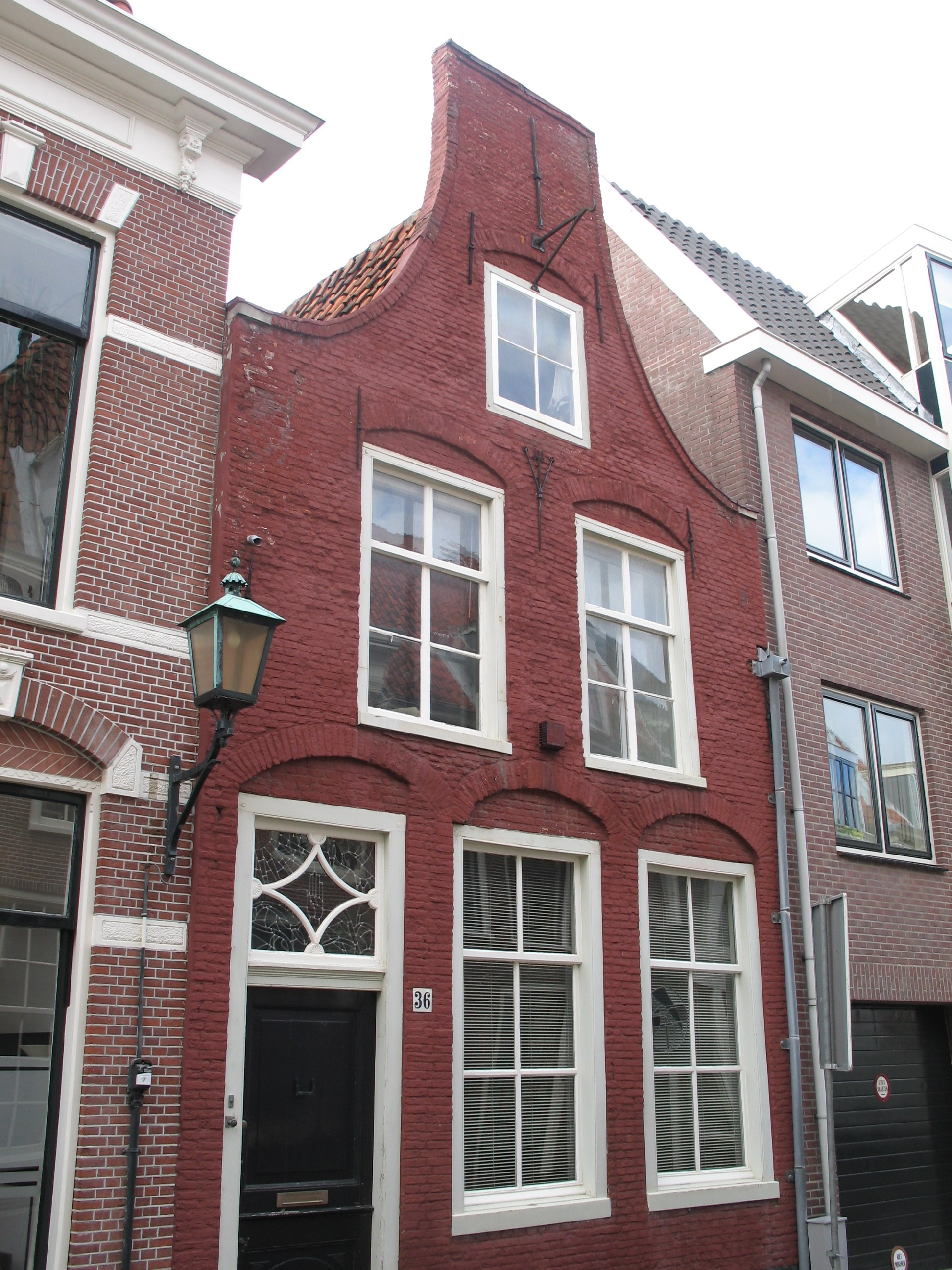
Klein Heiligland 36. Jules Chapon's workshop across the street from Boot, and later the first location of Galerie Espace in 1956

=== Amsterdam ===
The success of Heyboer's art did not result in a happier marriage; after convincing Erna to live on a boat again they moved to Amsterdam supposedly en route southwards. The prospect of spending a cold winter on board the boat with a baby made Erna decide to leave and in the fall of 1958 she returned to Haarlem with Marcelle and in 1959 they divorced so that Anton could marry his new love Yvonne. His marriage with Yvonne only lasted until halfway through 1960 and in the fall of that year he moved with his new love Maria to a farmhouse in Ouderkerk aan de Amstel.

== Works ==
After receiving training as a draughtsman, Heyboer made works consisting of landscape drawings and cartoon illustrations, later creating etching plates that he then sold on to printers. Some of these are directly related to the work of other popular artists, as he created them on commission. In the early war years, he made some illustrations for the Joh. Enschedé company, one of the few Haarlem businesses that was still able to support young artists. From 1950 he was in the SBBK and for his "Contraprestatie", he submitted works regularly. This was a support scheme whereby Anton was dependent on the judgement of the artist-commissioners in the judgement committee, and during the years he was in the program these were Levinus Tollenaar and Mari Andriessen.

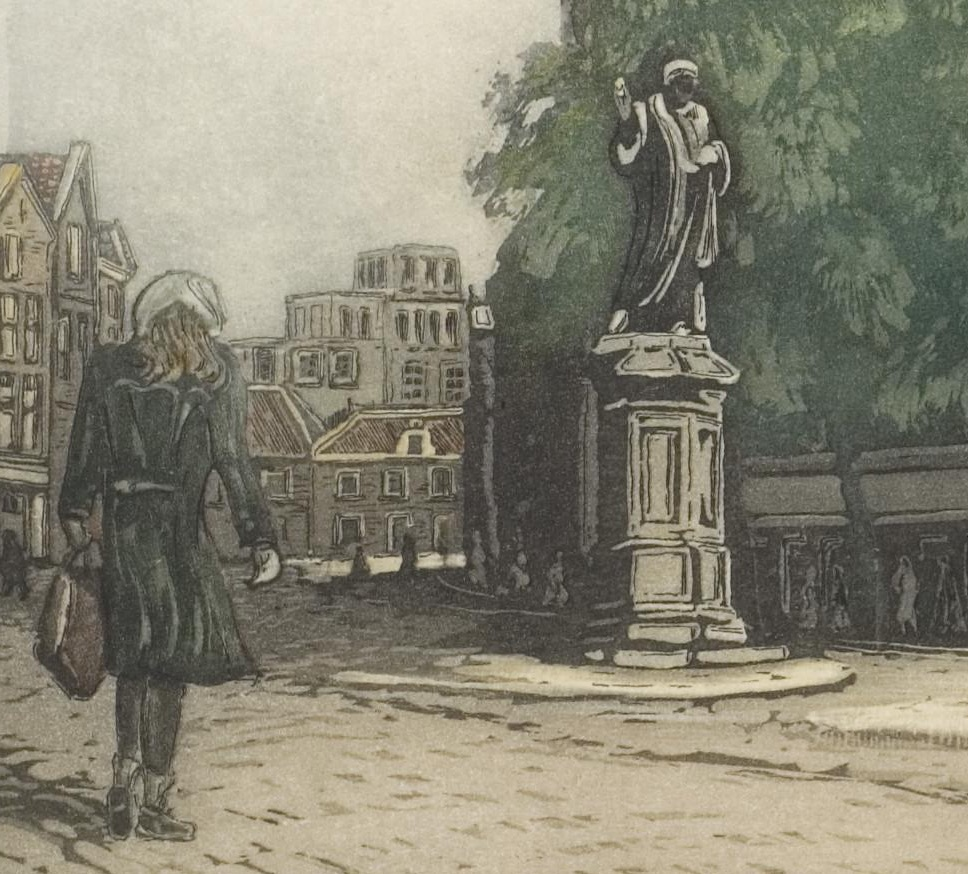
Detail of a larger print from 1948. This work shows the type of work Heyboer made after his return from Borger.

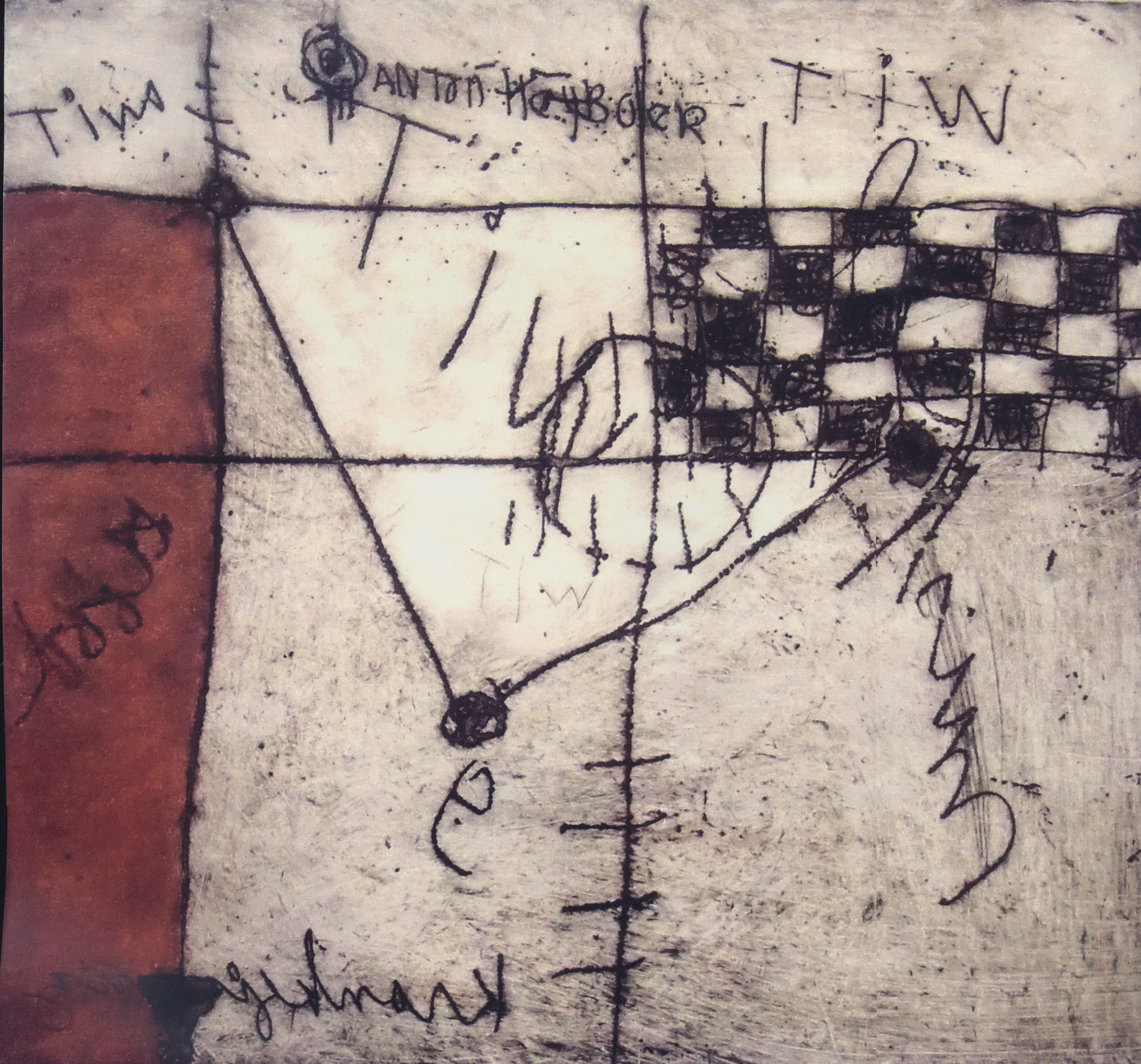
"Krankzinnig", so-called after the word 'crazy' written backwards bottom left. Etching from 1957 after Heyboer stayed in hospital and began developing his "system"

== Commune in Den Ilp ==
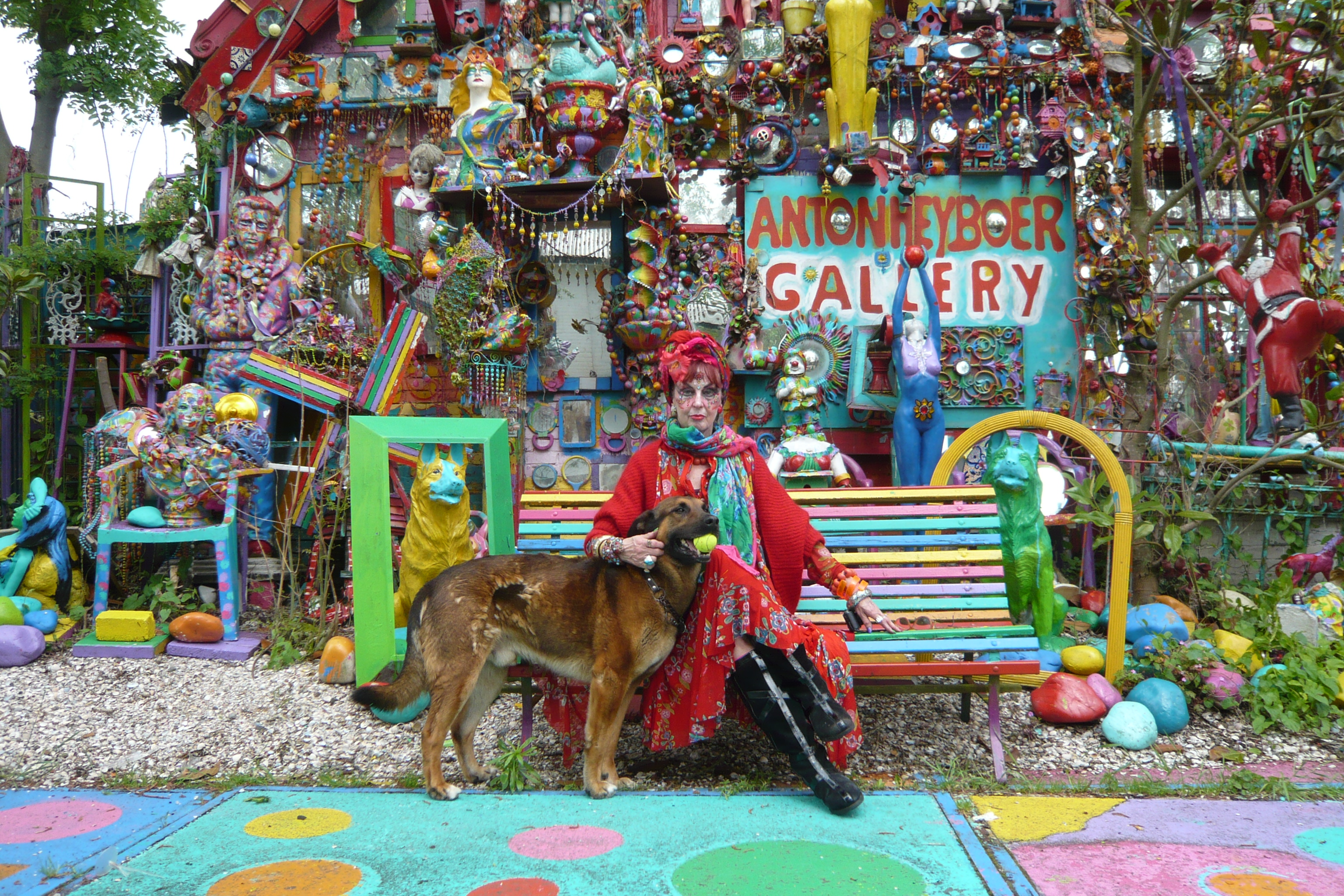
Petra Heyboer sitting in front of her Heyboer gallery in Den Ilp

Unlike his earlier wives, Maria (who was formerly known as "Ria") accepted his lifestyle completely, and when they moved to Den Ilp it was in the understanding that they lived in complete "innocence" according to Anton's "System". Heyboer renamed her Maria in honor of the holy mother. Whenever he fell in love with another woman, Maria opened the door of their home and thus Anton's famous commune was founded that is known as "De Bruiden van Heyboer" (the brides of Heyboer), which include the women Maria (from 1960), Ingrid (1964 only), Lotti (from 1965), Marike (from 1974), Joke (from 1975). They still live there and receive visitors to the Heyboer homestead. The fifth, Petra (from 1987), lives on the other side of the road in her own gallery.

== Breakthrough ==
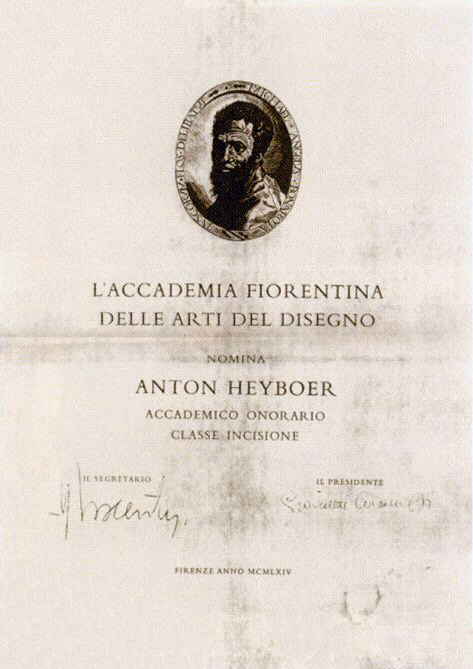
Certificate of "honorary engraver" from the Accademia delle Arti del Disegno, awarded to Anton in 1964.

In the 1960s, Heyboer's art began to receive international recognition. He was a loyal client of the Galerie Espace and participated in various exhibitions recommended by them. He showed works in the Documenta 2 in 1959, the Documenta 3 (1964), and the Documenta 4 (1969) in Kassel, each in the department of graphic arts. In 1962 he received the Ohara Museum Prize in the 3rd International Biennale of Prints in Tokyo, Japan, and in 1964 the "Accademia Fiorentina delle arte del disegno" of Florence made him "Academico Onorario classe incisione".

== Break with the art market ==
In 1984 Anton Heyboer broke with Espace and the entire establishment of museums and the art market in general. He felt that his work was overpriced and felt constricted by rules about how many prints he was allowed to make from an etching. He wanted to shake up the art world and the lives of contemporary artists and desired to enable the public to experience art as a part of daily life. He secluded himself in Den Ilp, where he lived and worked until his death. His wife Petra Heijboer-Timmermans who left her gallery in Laren in order to set up a new "gallery" in Den Ilp, took (and still takes) care of the marketing and sale of his artwork to anyone who showed up on his doorstep. Her "Anton Heyboer gallery" has become a pilgrimage of sorts.

The Dutch comedian André van Duin paid a visit to the Heyboer Den Ilp homestead in 1996 and included it in his comedy TV show in his role as meneer Wijdbeens.

== Legacy ==
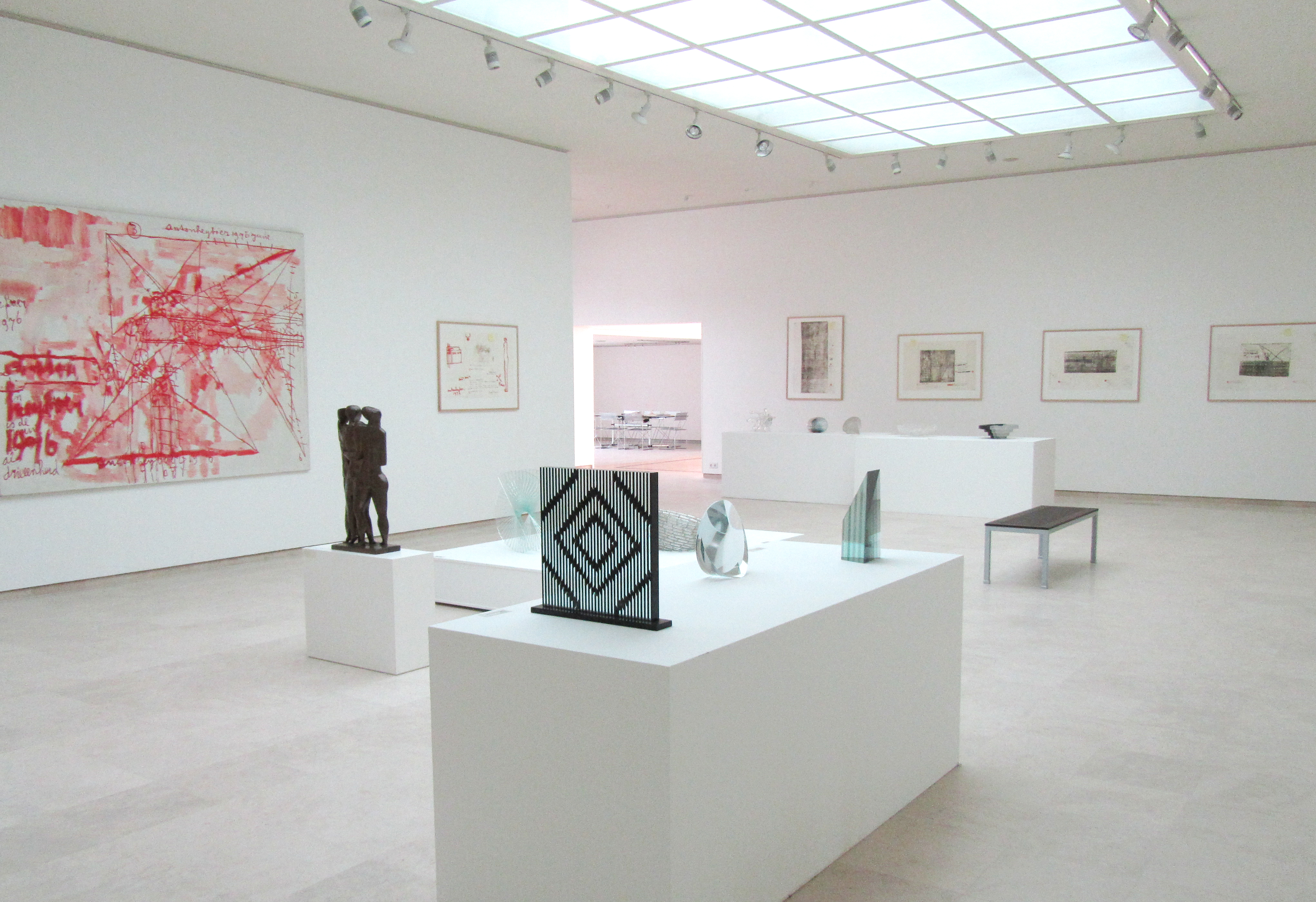
View of room in Museum Jan van der Togt with a Heyboer in the collection

On 10 April 2002 Heyboer was awarded the honorary title Ridder in de Orde van Oranje-Nassau. His most valued works are considered to be from his earlier years from the late 1950s, 1960s and 1970s, before he formally broke with the art world.

In 2012 an exhibition of his Haarlem works was to be shown at the Museum de Fundatie in Zwolle, but the museum cancelled because the owner of the works, Couzijn Simon, was unable to show the provenance of the works in a way that satisfied the museum's directors. He claimed to have bought from a "Mr. Bijvoet", a friend of Heyboer. A later comment on this TV interview was given by another gallery owner who claimed that he owned a false Heyboer and that more of Heyboer's contemporaries had had forgeries of their works appearing on the market, and that the reservations about provenance made by the art taxation expert Willem de Winter (of Kunst en Kitsch) were probably correct. In the TV interview it was clear from a short clip of Heyboer at work (from TV archives) that the artist would have been delighted to see such posthumous squabbling occurring among art lovers about his work.
