= Eva Bendien =

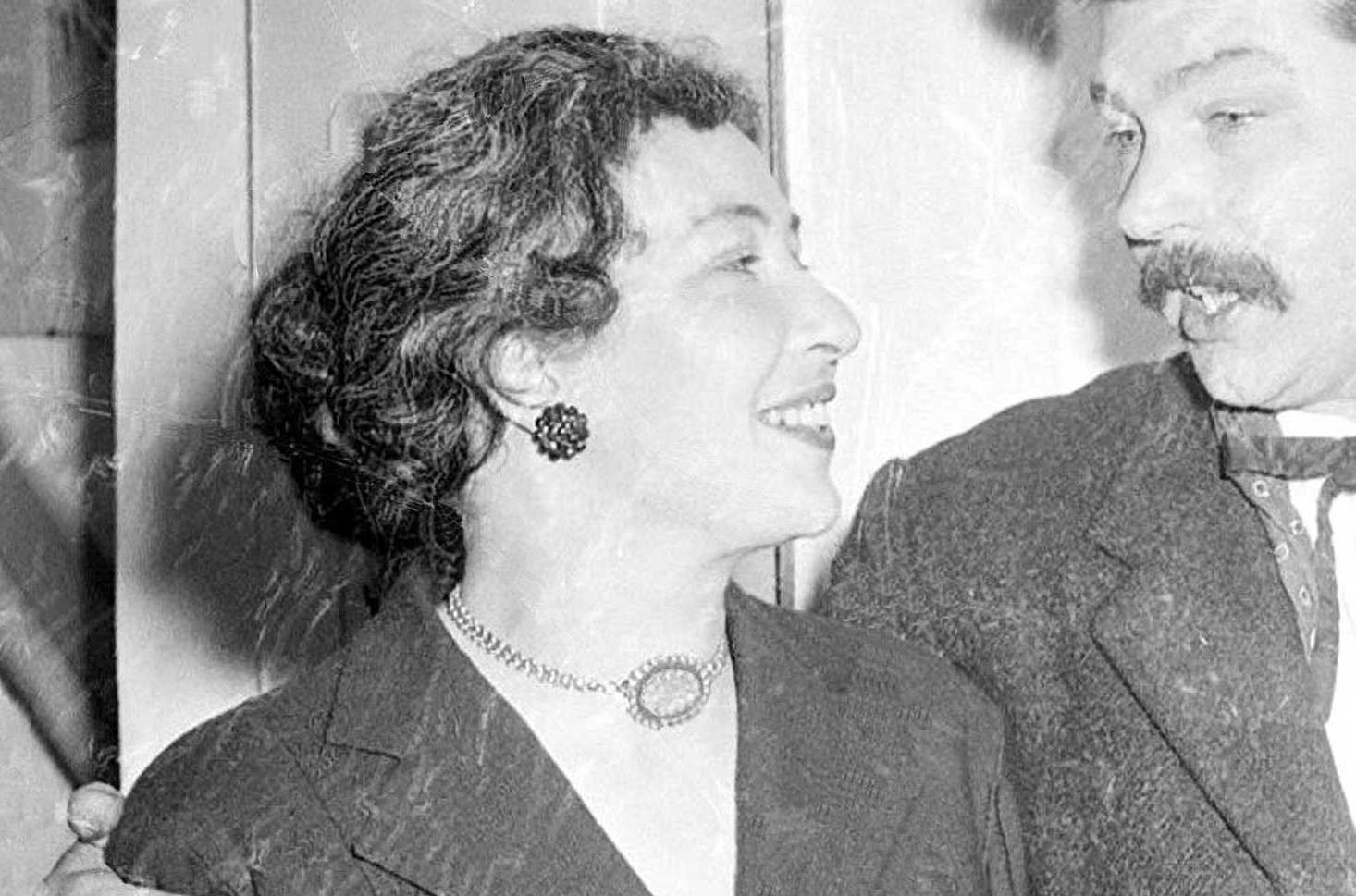
- Bendien in 1957
- Born: 8 January 1921; Arnhem, Netherlands
- Died: 8 March 2000 (aged 79); Amsterdam, Netherlands
- Occupation: Gallery owner
- Relatives: Jacob Bendien (uncle); Paul Citroen (uncle)

Eva Bendien (8 January 1921 – 8 March 2000) was a Dutch art collector and art gallery owner.

== Biography ==
She was born in Arnhem as the daughter of an English teacher, and on her mother's side was the niece of the abstract painters Jacob Bendien and Paul Citroen. After a short period working as assistant for the director of the Royal Academy in The Hague, a position she obtained through her uncle Citroen, the war broke out.

Though her mother was Jewish, her father had become a born-again Christian and her mother did not practise her religion. Thus the first few years of the war were not difficult for her because she didn't wear a yellow star or have a "J" written in her passport. However her family was forced to go underground and Eva spent time at diverse underground addresses in Amsterdam, Bergen, Haarlem, Sneek, Boekelo, and Bornebroek, with the last few months spent in the "Verscholen dorp" a colony of earthen huts housing 86 people in the woods between Nunspeet and Vierhouten. Her parents were in a separate block and her father would visit after dark in the evenings to read Shakespeare. Her brother Jaap did not survive the war.

After the war she lived in Paris for six months and on her return lived in Amsterdam where she worked for the Rijksmuseum and married the painter Jan Peeters (1912–1992) who was in a group of painters called "The Realists". They had a son. Eva quit her regular job and assisted the art gallery M.L. de Boer on an ad hoc basis with the set up of exhibitions, while starting to deal in art prints on the side, helped by her uncle Citroen. Her marriage broke up 5 years later and she moved with her son to Heemstede, where her friend Polly Meurs was living with her husband the painter Jules Chapon. Eva got a job in the Asian gallery of W.J.G. van Meurs on the Keizersgracht 578 near the Spiegelstraat but was fired because she needed to leave work early to pick up her son.

== Galerie Espace ==
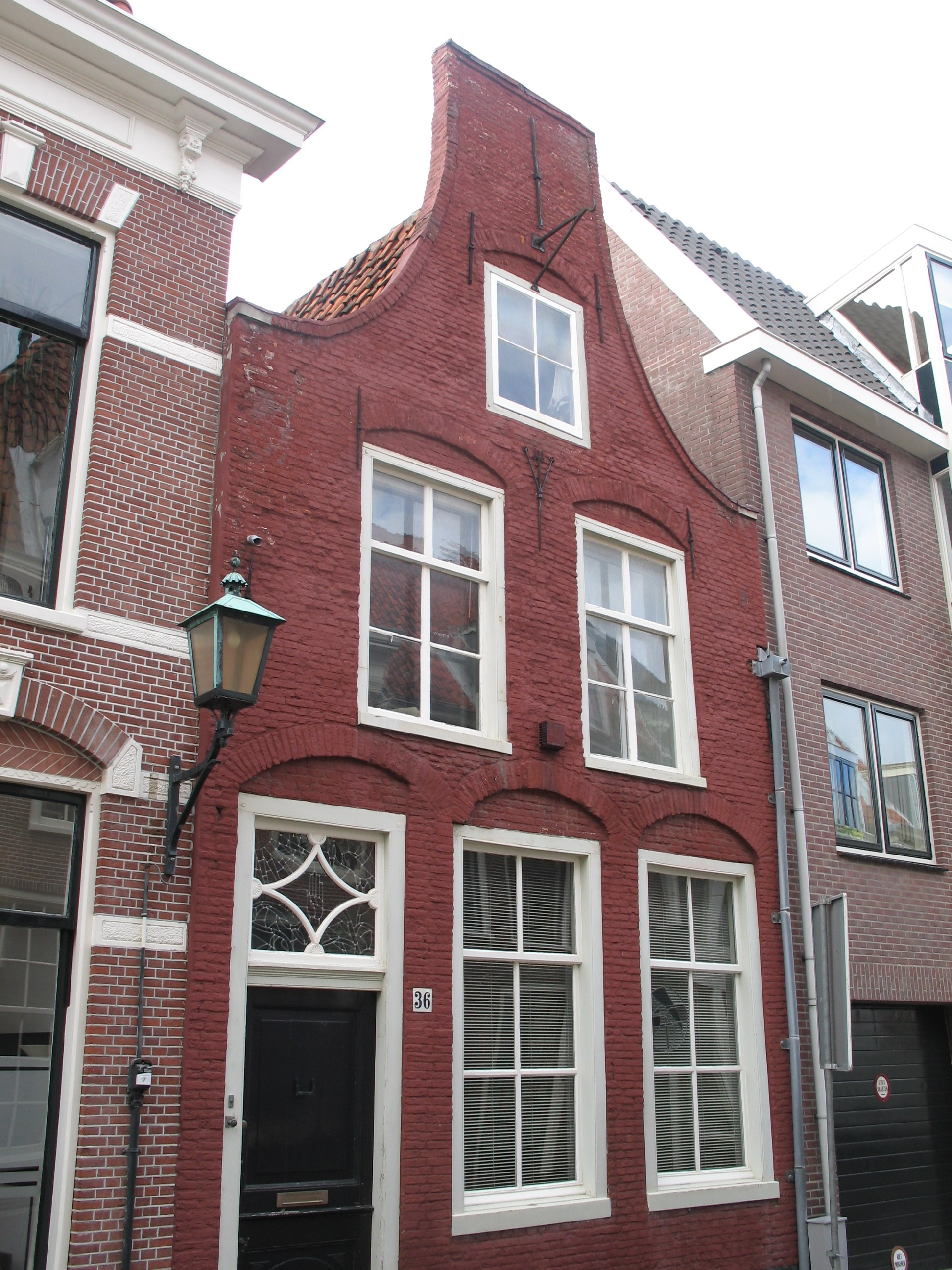
First location of Galerie Espace on Klein Heiligland 36, Haarlem

Together with Polly, Eva started her own gallery of modern art in 1957 called Galerie Espace on the Klein Heiligland 36 in Haarlem. In 1960 they moved the Gallery to Amsterdam near where Eva used to work, on Keizersgracht 548. In 1963 Polly moved to Brussels to start an art gallery there and Eva married Rutger Noordhoek Hegt (1933–2007) who assisted her with and became also director of the gallery in Amsterdam.

She died in Amsterdam.

== Gallery archive ==
According to the RKD they have the archives of the gallery that were donated after the death of Eva's husband.

The archives have letters and receipts for early works by Anton Heyboer, Reinier Lucassen, Roger Raveel, Lucebert, Wessel Couzijn, Pierre Alechinsky, Jules Chapon, Corneille, Hugo Claus, Klaas Gubbels, Kees Okx, Pearl Perlmutter, Carel Visser and Karel Appel.
