= Josef Santen =

Dutch painter

Josef Santen (1926 – 1988), was a Dutch painter.

== Biography ==
He was born in Amsterdam. According to the RKD he was a pupil of Henri Boot and 3rd prize winner of the Willink van Collen prize. He lived a short period with Anton Heyboer and his first wife Elsa in the Zonnesteeg in Haarlem before he owned his own workshop. He became a member of Kunst zij ons doel, and was second chairman in 1971. He died in Haarlem.

== Heyboer forgery scandal ==
In a 2016 documentary about an art forgery scandal involving work by Heyboer that was first reported in 2012, the former Amsterdam "Anton Heyboer Gallery" owners George Knubben and Couzijn Simon were portrayed as having purchased "Haarlem-period" Heyboer works starting in April 2004 possibly coming from a collection formed by Santen. The seller, the graphic artist Robbert de Bakker, called himself "Bijvoet" when he sold the works and refused to say where the works came from exactly. The widows of Heyboer living in Den Ilp claim the works are false, though Heyboer's former wife during his "Haarlem-period", Erna Heyboer, claimed the works looked genuine to her. Experts claimed that if genuine, the works may have come from an "old Haarlem collection of etchings". One of the etchings shown in the documentary is signed on the back along with names "Josef Santen" and "Frans Verpoorten" written in such a way that the name of town "Santpoort" can be read. Both men were colleagues of Heyboer before he spent some time in a psychiatric institution in Santpoort. The collection is still untraced, but were returned to Knubben and Simon, who still firmly believe they are genuine.
