= Jacob Bendien =

Dutch painter

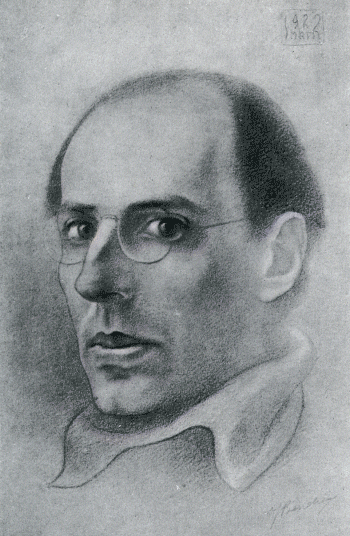
Selfportrait (1927)

Jacob Bendien (1890–1933), was a Dutch painter and graphic artist.

== Biography ==
He was born in Amsterdam but moved to Paris in 1911 where he met and worked with the sculptor-painter John Rädecker and the painter Jan van Deene. With them he later started making "Absolute schilderkunst", or "Absolute art", a form of abstract art that grew from their combined Amsterdam art show for the "De Onafhankelijken" (the Amsterdam "Independents" art club) in 1913.

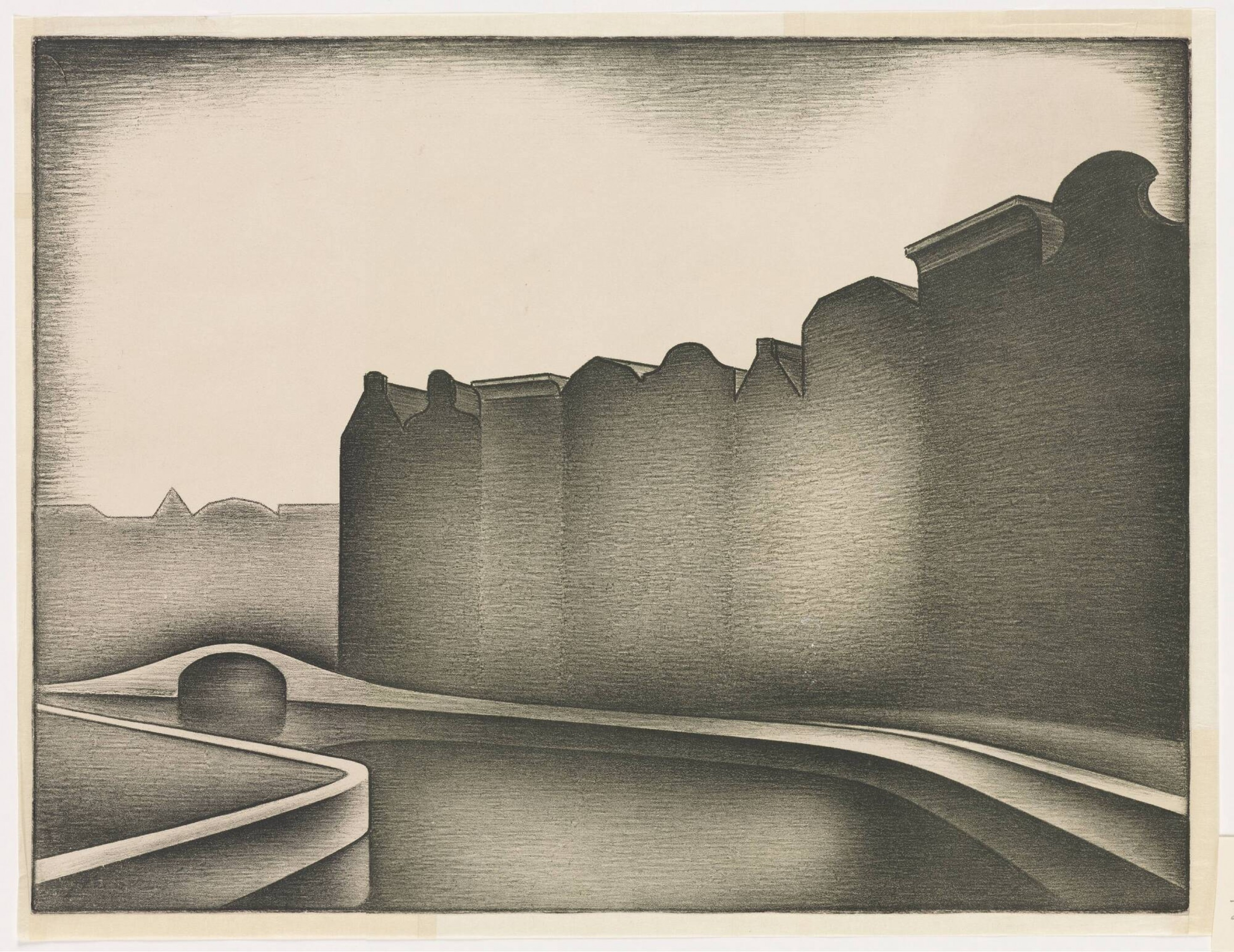
Canal, Lithograph

According to the RKD he was the uncle of Eva Bendien, who later started the Galerie Espace, a modern art gallery in Haarlem and Amsterdam.

He died in Hilversum of tuberculosis.
