= Otto B. de Kat =

Dutch painter

Otto Boudewijn de Kat (7 June 1907 in Dordrecht – 30 April 1995 in Laren), was a Dutch painter and art critic.

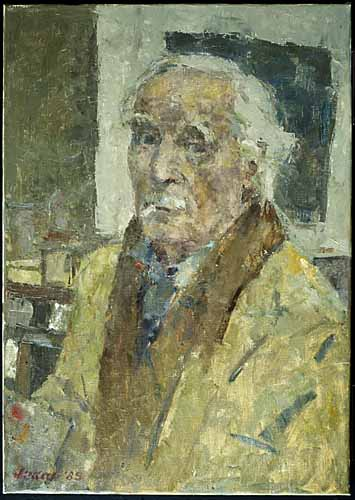
Otto B. de Kat, Selfportrait, 1985; 70 × 50 cm. Coll. Frans Halsmuseum, Haarlem

== Biography ==
He was born in Dordrecht, but received his training in Haarlem as a pupil of Henri Frédéric Boot and Samuel Jessurun de Mesquita. He married the poet Maria Jannetta (‘Hans’) van Zijl in 1930. They traveled to Italy, where De Kat's work was exhibited alongside work by Maurits Cornelis Escher, and France, where De Kat was inspired by fauvism and the members of the École de Paris. de Kat's work was included in the 1939 exhibition and sale Onze Kunst van Heden (Our Art of Today) at the Rijksmuseum in Amsterdam.

De Kat was a driving force behind the Kennemer Kunstenaarskring. After the war, he and Kees Verwey founded the Hollandse Aquarellistenkring and De Kat remained its chairman until after 1965. He moved to Bloemendaal and became a good friend of Godfried Bomans, helping him found the Teisterbant club. De Kat became a member of Arti et Amicitiae where he won the Arti Medal in 1969. Ten years later, in 1979, he received the Jeanne Oosting Prize.

He was an art critic for the newspaper Haarlems Dagblad in the years 1951–1955 and wrote for Het Vrije Volk. After 1955 he became a teacher at the Amsterdam Rijksakademie, where he would be a tutor for many artists until 1972. His relationship with Hans van Zijl came to an end, just before she died in 1963. De Kat moved to Amsterdam and remarried in 1964 with Danish artist Dora Dahl-Madsen. The couple spent a lot of time in their second house in France, an inspiring environment for De Kat. Due to health issues they left Amsterdam in 1992 and moved to Laren. He died there, at the age of 88.

== Work ==
As an artist, De Kat was influenced by the École de Paris and painters like Pierre Bonnard, Édouard Vuillard, Albert Marquet en Nicolas de Staël. His paintings are mostly landscapes and still lifes with an intimate, calm atmosphere. His surroundings were his most important source of inspiration. Although he used abstraction in his paintings, he never abandoned reality completely. As a teacher, he focused on craftmanship, the weight of tradition and the interplay between rationality and emotions. De Kat's work can be found in several Dutch museums, like the Frans Hals Museum and Teylers Museum in Haarlem and the Stedelijk Museum in Amsterdam.

== Public collections ==
Among the public collections holding works by Otto B. de Kat are:

- Frans Hals Museum, Haarlem
- Teylers Museum, Haarlem
- Stedelijk Museum, Amsterdam
- Rijksprentenkabinet, Amsterdam
- Singer, Laren
- Stadsgalerij Heerlen, Heerlen
- Museum Henriette Polak, Zutphen
- De Wieger, Deurne
- Museum Maassluis, Maassluis
- Drents Museum, Drenthe

== Exhibitions (selection) ==
- 9 April – 4 June 1978, Frans Hals Museum Haarlem
- 1–30 September 1984, Singer Museum Laren
- 13 October – 26 November 1989, Museum Henriette Polak Zutphen
- 26 September – 15 November 1992, Frans Hals Museum Haarlem
- 13 July – 8 September 2002, Frans Hals Museum Haarlem
- 15 March – 24 May 2008, Museum De Fundatie Zwolle
- 2019, Retrospective Otto B. de Kat, Museum Maassluis
- 4 october 2024 - 6 april 2025, Otto B. de Kat and Contemporaries - Jeanne Bieruma Oosting, Wim Oepts, Kees Verwey a.o., Museum JAN
