= Jules Chapon =

Dutch artist (1914–2007)

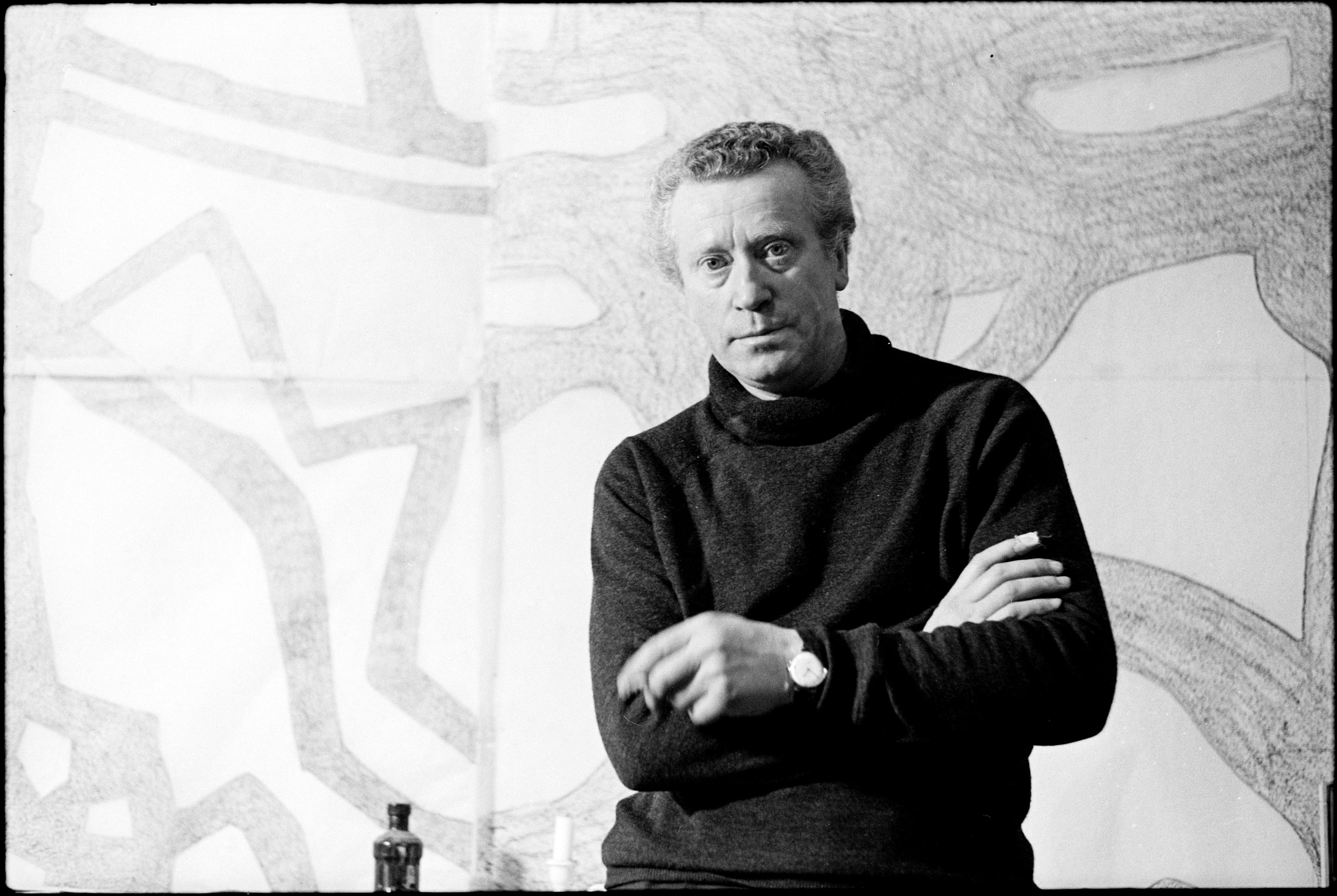
Jules Chapon, April 1964

Jules Chapon (4 September 1914 – 6 January 2007) was a Dutch artist who moved to France in 1973.

== Biography ==
Jules was born in Heemstede as the son of Barend Chapon, an Amsterdam stockbroker who was a member of the Heemstede city council as well as boardmember of the Haarlem Jewish community. His father became a member of the newly formed Heemstede building society Tuinwijk Zuid in 1918 and moved there when this project, designed by the architect J.B. van Loghem, was completed in 1923. One of Jules' first paintings of the back gardens of these houses was probably painted from his bedroom window. Though Chapon first began a career at the brokerage of his father, he took painting lessons from Kees Verwey.

== War years ==
His father was picked up and was executed by the Germans on 2 February 1943 along with 9 other innocent victims as retaliation for the murder of a German officer on the Verspronckweg on 30 January. This execution virtually wiped out the remaining leaders of the Jewish Community in Haarlem. Jules fled through the backyard when the rest of his family was picked up for deportation the same day. His mother, brother, and two sisters were brought via the Hollandsche Schouwburg and Westerbork to Auschwitz where they were killed. Only Jules and his sister Selma, who had been working that day, survived the war. After the war they returned to their house in Tuinwijk Zuid, which had been occupied by Jan Nederkoorn, the same man who had denounced his father and been the direct cause for the deaths of his mother and siblings. After the war Nederkoorn was tried and received the death sentence for war crimes, but only served five years. When the wife of this man came calling in the company of a police officer to collect belongings she claimed to have left behind, Jules' sister slammed the door in her face.

== Career as artist ==
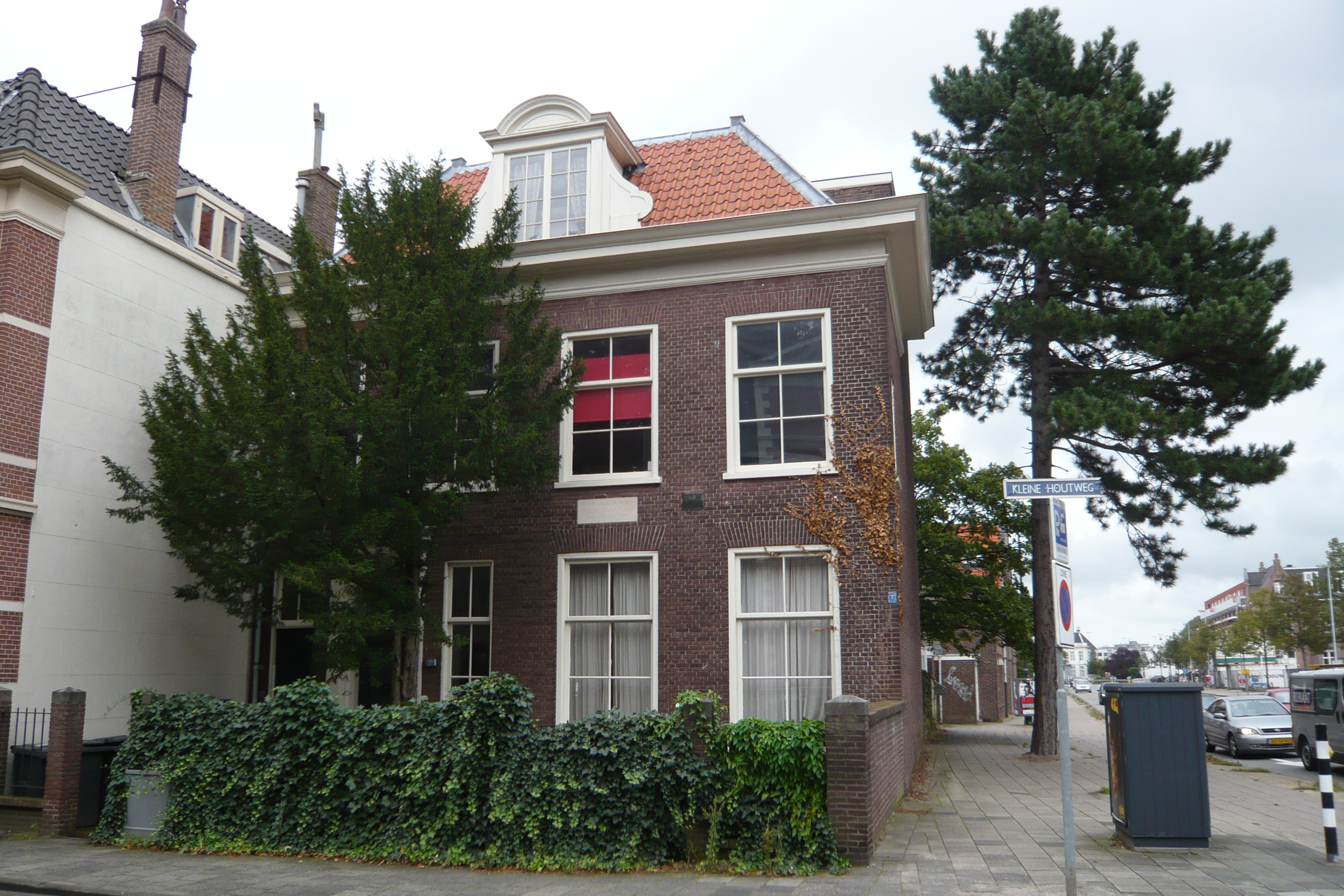
In November 1950 Jules had an exhibition of his work here at the Huis van Looy on the Kleine Houtweg.

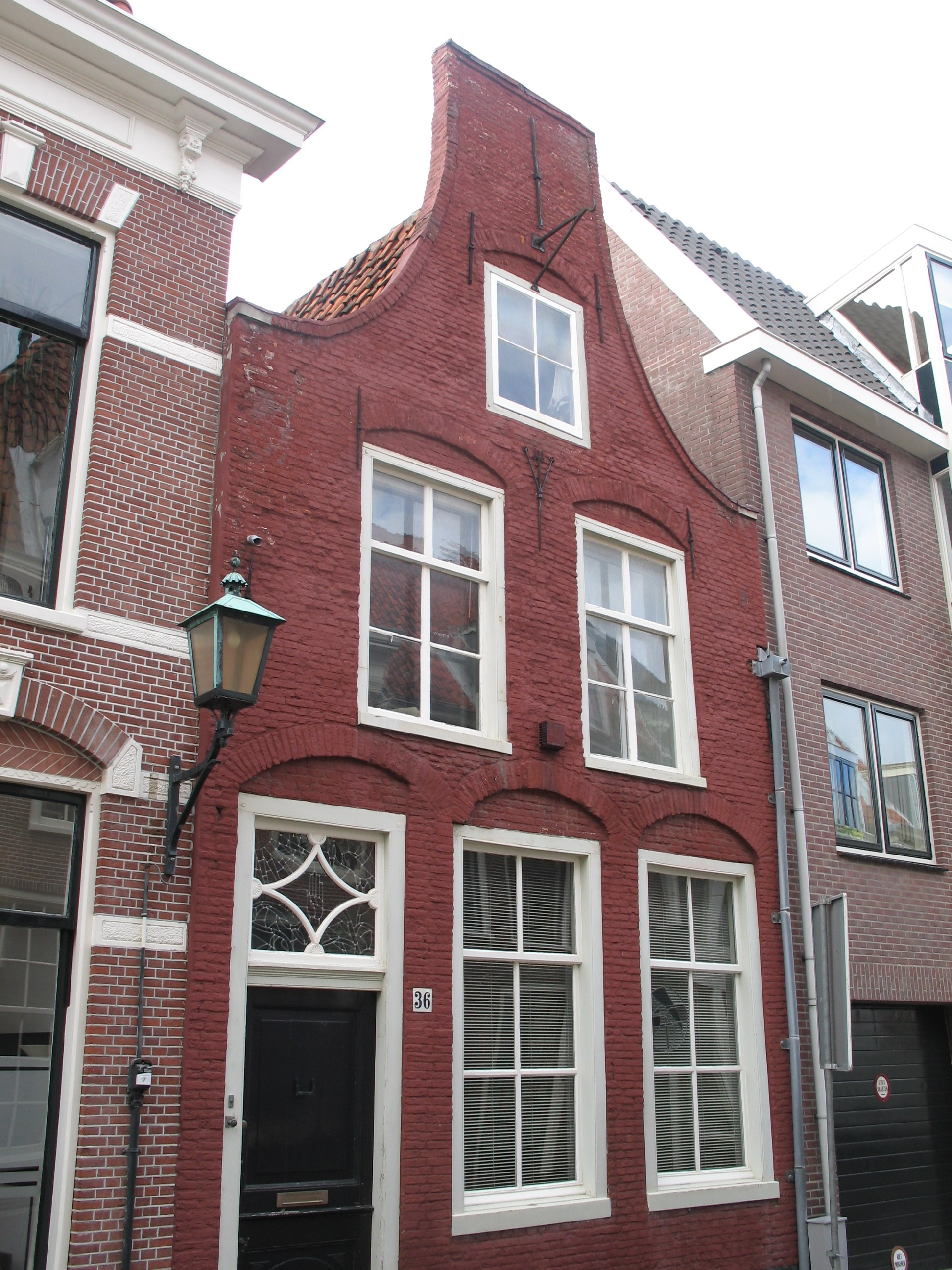
Klein Heiligland 36 in Haarlem, where Jules had his workshop and where later his wife Polly and Eva Bendien began their Galerie Espace in 1956

Jules had sketched during the war to while away the time in hiding and afterwards he became an artist full-time. He took lessons from Henri Frédéric Boot who lived across the street from the workshop he purchased to double as a gallery and in 1950 he had his first public exhibition in the Huis van Looy.

According to the RKD besides being a pupil of Boot and Verwey, Chapon became a member of the Haarlem artist society De Groep in 1951. In 1957 his wife Polly turned his informal art gallery into Galerie Espace, by partnering with Eva Bendien who brought sales experience and a network of connections in the art world of the time. Jules participated in more art shows in 1952, 1959, and 1962, but began creating large-scale monumental works that would not fit into a gallery and were usually created where they were commissioned. His wife left him in 1963 to start another art gallery in Brussels. In 1973 he emigrated to France where he married a second time and lived in Aquitaine until he died.
