= Jan Kagie =

Dutch painter

Jan Kagie (1907 in The Hague – 1991 in Amsterdam) was a Dutch painter. He became a pupil of his father, Johannes Leonardus Kagie and traveled with Anton Heyboer to France in 1947. Kagie won an Arti medal in 1984 and became a member of Arti et Amicitiae during the years 1969–1984. His paintings consisted of figurative art, landscapes, interiors, still lifes and abstract art.
