= Purmerland =

- Village
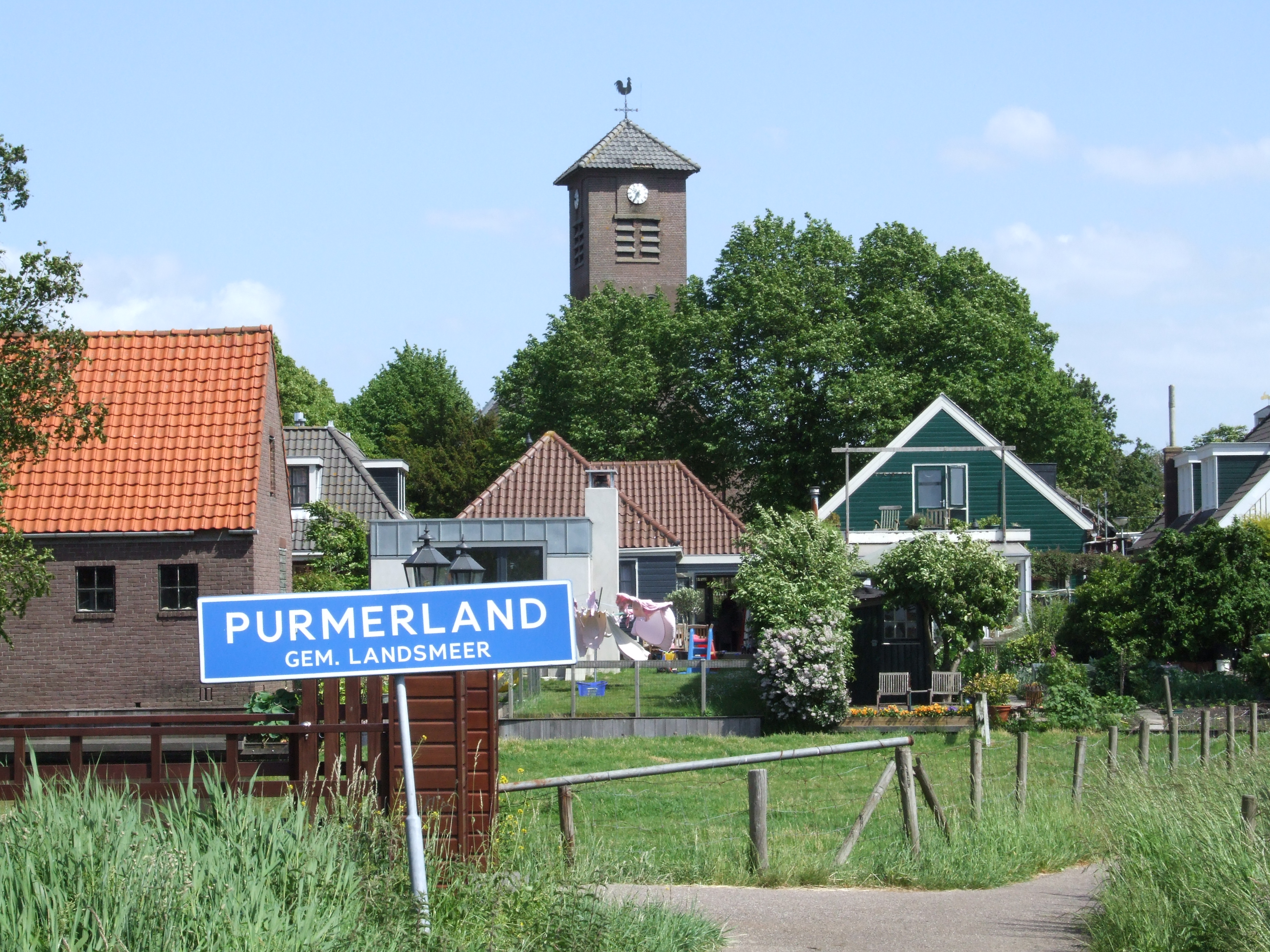
- View on Purmerland

- Location in the Netherlands Location in the province of North Holland in the Netherlands
- Coordinates: 52°29′N 4°56′E
- Country: Netherlands
- Province: North Holland
- Municipality: Landsmeer

Area
  - Total: 3.28 km^{2} (1.27 sq mi)
- Elevation: −1.3 m (−4.3 ft)

Population (2021)
  - Total: 355
  - Density: 108/km^{2} (280/sq mi)
- Time zone: UTC+1 (CET)
  - Summer (DST): UTC+2 (CEST)
- Postal code: 1451
- Dialing code: 0299

Purmerland is a village of 395 (January 2007) in the municipality of Landsmeer, North Holland, the Netherlands. It is located just north of Den Ilp and just south of the housing estate of Weidevenne, part of the city of Purmerend. It is directly connected to both of these as Purmerland, like Den Ilp and Landsmeer is mainly characterised by ribbon building along the main road. Purmerland was part of the Free and high Lordship of Purmerend, Purmerland and Ilpendam.

== History ==
The village was first mentioned in 1358 as "de Kercke van Purmer", and means "land belonging to Purmer".

Although the present size of the village would not suggest it, Purmerland was once a village of some importance. The man standing highlighted at center on Rembrandt's Night Watch painting is Frans Banning Cocq. He was Mayor of Amsterdam, Lord of Purmerland and Ilpendam and Lord of castle Ilpenstein. During the Dutch Golden Age the country surrounding villages like these was Amsterdam's breadbasket, as the draining of bogland created bountiful fertile soil. However, the draining of the soil caused it to shrink, until it reached the water level of the Zuiderzee only a few miles to the east. Soil erosion thus brought about the demise of Purmerland's limited prominence. Nowadays the population is largely made up of town people seeking a country retreat in a small village now characterised by large mansions which have replaced the original smaller cottages.

== See also ==
- Free and high Lordship of Purmerend, Purmerland and Ilpendam
