= Hans Heyting =

Dutch writer, poet and painter

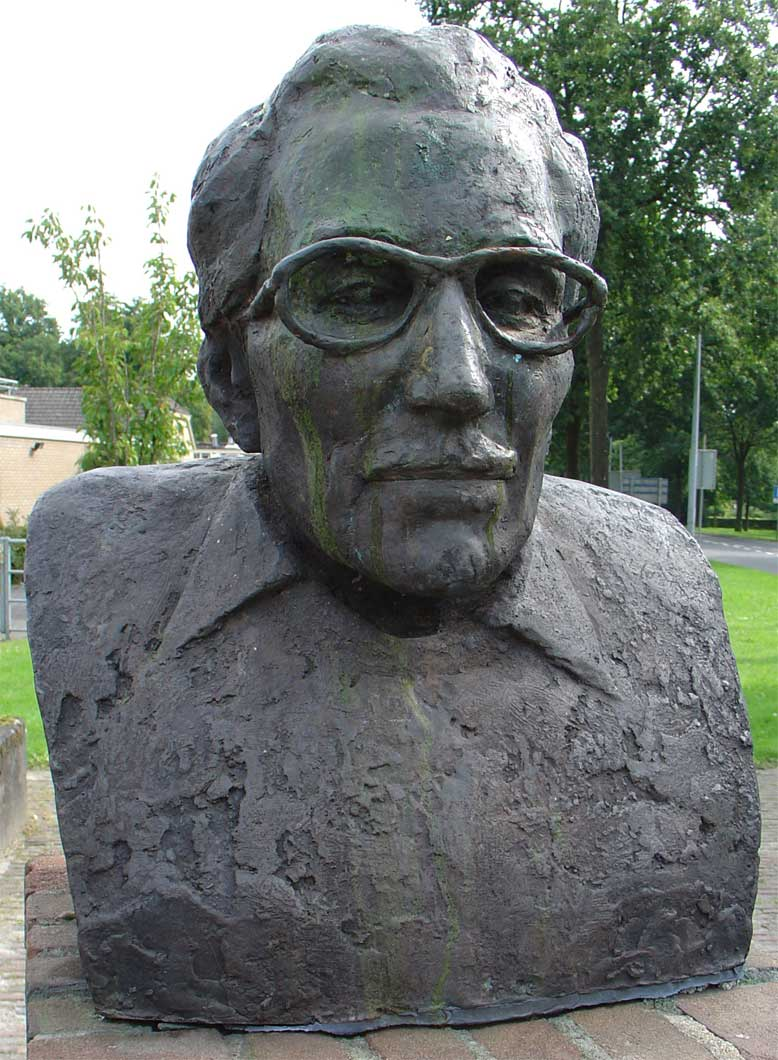
- Bust of Hans Heyting in Borger
- Born: Johannes Heijting; 13 August 1918; Beilen, Drenthe, Netherlands
- Died: 9 June 1992 (aged 73); Assen, Drenthe, Netherlands
- Occupations: poet, writer, radio presenter, painter
- Spouse: Wilhelmina Carolina Hilverink

Hans Heyting (13 August 1918 – 9 June 1992), born Johannes Heijting was a Dutch poet, playwright, radio personality, children's book writer and painter. Writing in Drèents (except for his Dutch-language children's books and some poems in Dutch), he was one of the earliest Drèents writers to express personal themes and is considered to have been "the first true, modern Drèents poet who innovated old forms and showed new ways".

== Youth ==
Heyting was born along the Beilervaart, not far from the village of Beilen. He and his three sisters grew up in a poor family of gereformeerd (reformed) creed. His father was a clogmaker and poached on the side to add to the family income; in his spare time he painted and drew. Reflected on his father's artistic activity, Hans noted that he "painted small landscapes, very primitively, with brushes made of his own hair. When he'd been to the barber, he took tufts of hair with him. Ja! None of his work was kept."

When he was about ten, his father died; he and his sister found the body. From this point on, Heyting - who detested the suffocating atmosphere at the reformed school - became alienated from his surroundings. He remarked on his faith that he was taught: "I felt God was spying on me all day long. At night I sensed an angel standing by the bed. I was terrified because I could feel the draught of his wings beating." Around this time he met his later fellow Drèents poet, Roel Reijntjes, who was also from Beilen.

Heyting was expelled from vocational school in Hoogeveen for blowing up the bicycle shed with a homemade bomb. Various contacts outside his family caused the rift between him and his background to grow; later he would cut the ties completely. He worked as an electrician's apprentice and a paperboy for some time.

== Work as a painter ==
Because of a humpback - presumably caused by rickets - Heyting was unable to perform strenuous physical labour. He was trained as a painter at the studio of Louis Kortenhorst in Assen, painting mainly children's portraits. The journalist and religion teacher G.A. de Ridder, whose children he portrayed, introduced him to literature. Heyting's interest in art and literature grew when he met Hendrik Fernhout, an authority on literature who was being cared for at psychiatric institution Beileroord. Fernhout especially familiarized Heyting with the poet Rilke. Heyting's physician Meijering proved another influence on his intellectual development.

Heyting made friends, and fell in love, with Ina Konings, a girl who was sixteen years younger and who lived next door to the Heytings. He painted and drew her and gave her a prominent place in his later poems and children's books. It was long thought that she died of tuberculosis at age thirteen and because of this, lived on as Heyting's muse. Heyting stated: "She has become my inspiration. She always shows up in my work. (...) Because she died, she stayed alive for me." However, in 2005 Drèents scholar Henk Nijkeuter established that she was still alive and living abroad.

== Life in Borger ==
In 1944, during World War II, Heyting went in hiding at a general practitioner's in the village of Borger. He later said, "At the end of the war, in 1944, I got in trouble with Fritz. I went about freely and that was no longer permitted. I was afraid I'd be arrested." He briefly returned to Beilen just after the war, but memories of his reformed childhood drove him back to Borger, where he would stay for the rest of his life. He painted in the post-war years, joined the Drents Painters Society and wrote about painting in the periodicals Erica, Drenthe, and Nieuwe Drentsche Volksalmanak.

In 1946, Heyting lived for a while with painter Anton Heyboer, whose interest in Drenthe had been fanned by Vincent van Gogh's letters to his brother Theo. In the same year, Heyting joined the painters' association De Drentse Schilders (which existed from 1946 to 1954) and exhibited his work in Assen and Emmen. Following the exhibitions, he got many commissions for portraiture, but he had a growing conviction that he lacked the requisite talent. About this he wrote in a poem, "Is it pointless? Something fleeting, this laborious digging down? / Has everything he does not been done better?" The Drentse Schilders collective disintegrated due to conflicts between members; at one point, Heyting and two of his colleagues had spent the association's funds on booze.

The portraits painted by Heyting are in various private collections. Many of his paintings were destroyed when the museum farm he was living in burnt down in 1967. The few extant still lifes show an affinity with the Magic Realist style. After the fire, Heyting focussed more on writing, and "gradually his work took on a literary dimension".

In 1954, Heyting married Wilhelmina Carolina Hilverink ('Wil') from Hengelo.

== Radio work ==
Heyting became a stage director at the dramatic society of Borger. At private parties after performances, he often recited his work, played the lute and sung his own compositions. In 1950 he was seriously injured when jumping off the stage and was bedridden for almost a year. In 1951, he directed his own play De vrömde vögel (The oddball) about a painter who settles in a Drents village.

He became active as a writer and performer at Regionale Omroep Noord, the regional radio station, and got voice training from the station's director. He wrote Drèents texts for singers De Thrianta's and presented a fortnightly programme on art in Drenthe. Heyting performed in his own radio play Schuppen is troef and grew out to a popular radio presence in the province. His radio sketches feature village characters, their merits and especially their shortcomings. The Drèents-language programmes on regional radio strongly helped awaken people's interest in the regional language. At age 62, Heyting quit radio work because it was becoming too much of a physical burden.

At the time of his radio work, Heyting was also employed at the library for the blind in Groningen, for which he selected voices to record material.

== Poetry ==
Heyting published four collections of his own poetry: Tweetalig (Bilingual, 1973, with poems in Dutch by Harm Werners), Spiegelschrift (Mirror writing, 1977), Toegift (Encore, 1983) and Dubbelfocus. Een cyclus gedichten (Bifocal. A poetry cycle, 1986). As to why he had only collected his poetry at a late stage, he declared, "You see, I'm not the type to peddle my own work".

In the nineteen-fifties, Heyting was a member of the Drentse Schrieverskring, the Drèents writer's circle. His first poems were published by the Drèents-language monthly Oeze Volk which he helped found and of which he was a long-standing editor. In 1966-1967 he was the sole editor for a year, when the editorship was continued by writer Bart Veenstra. From 1980 on, Heyting published in the avant-garde Drèents literary magazine Roet, of which he was also an editor for a number of years.

Heyting was initially influenced by traditional Drèents-language poets such as L.A. Roessingh and Jan Naarding, writing anecdotal verse in archaic Drèents. Later, he was one of the first Drèents poets to distance himself from traditionalist poetry. Drèents poet Gerard Nijenhuis a friend of Heyting's, wrote about this change, "Concepts are no longer described in detail, but only hinted at. (...) Moreover, the content becomes more 'condensed'."

Marga Kool, a fellow Drèents poet, discerns two main themes in Heyting's poems, "the safe home as contrasted with the stupid, frightening outside world" and "the girl who has passed away". The first theme is exemplified in the poem Spiegelschrift (Mirror writing):

We would like to stay
together for a long time to come,
press our threadbare bodies together
firmly yet softly and listen to
the wind and rain singing
and write the following words
on the steamed-up windows:
'two children, orphans, sheltered here'
from outside it's mirror writing
but outsiders needn't read it

The other key theme, the deceased girl, is reminiscent of the poetry of Gerrit Achterberg, which is informed by a similar theme. Heyting also shares Achterberg's penchant for choosing technical words as titles for poems (Optiek, Dubbelfocus, Concaaf).

Heyting's poems often express highly personal sentiments, which was rare in Drèents poetry before the nineteen-eighties. Roel Reijntjes saw as Heyting's central theme the pain of being a loner, an outsider, different from others, including physically; socializing with many yet feeling lonely.

Using the pseudonym Hans Heideknupper, Heyting wrote nonsense verse which was published in several publications; he prepared a collection of comic poems, Het malle vel (The silly skin), which was never published.

== Further writing ==
Most of Heyting's books appeared in the seventies and eighties: poetry volumes, translations and nine children's books.

Heyting began to write children's books at the suggestion of writers Gerard Nijenhuis and Anne de Vries. He wrote them in Dutch (there was no extant market for children's books in Drèents). He felt a strong affinity for children, something about which his friend G. de Jonge declared, "Hans loved children and this shows clearly in his poetry and writing. Children also loved him. This was obvious when on Saturdays our grandchildren and their parents went to visit the Heytings. (...) Not a word was spoken, gestures and looks of understanding were enough. Hans started to read to the children and their thumbs went into their mouths."

Heyting's novel Om je dood te schamen (Shame!) was voted best children's book of the year by a children's jury in 1979; a year later his novel Eva en Bert alleen (Eva and Bert alone) was awarded the same distinction. Heyting later distanced himself from his early children's books, saying that the publishers had restricted him too much. The stories had to be sweeter than he had intended to write them, and he was asked to scrap passages in Drèents. Heyting received a lot of fan mail, mainly from girls aged 12 to 15 who wore glasses just like the stories' protagonists. Many of his fans also visited him.

In 1974, Heyting was awarded the Cultural Prize of Drenthe; in 1979 he received the golden medal of honour in the Order of Orange-Nassau. Heyting retreated from public life in his final years. He deteriorated physically, suffered pains and had a cancer operated on. When he could no longer cycle, he made his way through the village on an electric motorcycle. He declared to Gerard Nijenhuis, "I wouldn't like to die, I love life dearly. I think I will reconcile myself with the prospect of death fast. It's just, I would just like to spend some more time with my wife." Hans Heyting died in 1992 in the Wilhelmina Hospital in Assen.

== After his death ==
A few months after his death, Roet magazine dedicated an issue to Heyting.

A bust of Heyting by Bert Kiewiet was placed in the centre of Borger. The plaque reads, "Writer, poet, recorder of the Drèents language. Co-founder of Drèents monthly OEZE VOLK. The Oeze Volk Foundation has placed this commemorative bust on the occasion of its 40th anniversary. To honour Hans for his services rendered to Drenthe and its language."

In 2004, the Drèents language institute Drentse Taol (now Huus van de Taol) released a video portrait of Heyting entitled Een kapotte bril (Broken glasses) on DVD.

In 2005, publisher Het Drentse Boek released Heyting's collected poems, De dichter en de wichter: verzamelde gedichten van Hans Heyting. Edited by Henk Nijkeuter, the collection includes a short biography and a bibliography. The publisher released a CD in 2006, Drentse dichters lezen: Hans Heyting, on which Drèents writers read poems by Heyting.

== Critical assessment ==
Heyting's early dramatic work was received positively: the monthly Drenthe wrote that his play De vrömde vögel "is vastly better than what has appeared so far in this field" His children's books were characterized by the Lectuur-repertorium as "easy-to-read, unpretentious popular stories for young people" Drèentse schrieverij, a history of Drèents literature, judges Heyting's book Esther en het geheim van opa (Esther and grandpa's secret, 1983) to attain the level of well-known children's book author Guus Kuijer.

With regard to Heyting's painting, Drentse Taol refers to his artistic shortcomings, in contrast to the verdict on his poetry, "His poems in Drèents are among the best work written in Drèents." Drèentse schrieverij concurs, "Hans Heyting's work, especially his poetry, has great authority. Coming from the restricted tradition of dialect writing, he innovated it, moving from general themes such as descriptions of nature and village life to writing about issues as personal as grief about a deceased child, longing for a lost love, trying vainly to conquer death. [...] Heyting can be seen as the first true, modern Drèents poet who innovated old forms and showed new ways."

== Selected works ==
- De kat in 't gaoren. Drents bliedspul in drie bedrijven (play, year of publication unknown, Meppel: Neerlandia)
- De vrömde vögel. Toneelspel in 3 bedrijven voor 3 dames en 7 heren (play, 1952, Meppel: Neerlandia)
- Drentse versjes; vergaard voor 't bestuur van de afd. Drenthe van de Nederlandse Bond van Plattelandsvrouwen (1954, with Grietje Clewits and Jan Naarding, Assen: HDG)
- Kribberij um 't kamnet. Drents bliedspul in 3 bedrieven (play, 1958, with Hans Werners (pseudonym of Gerard Nijenhuis), Winschoten: Toneelfonds Festa)
- Dichtersriege, keur oet Drentse gedichten van 1900-1966 (1966, with Roel Reijntjes, Assen: Van Gorcum & Comp.)
- Op de gribbelgrab, verhalen, gedichten en riempies van Drènse dialektschrievers bij 'n kanner gaard deur Hans Heyting (1968, Haren: Knoop en Niemeijer)
- De vriendinnen Lottie en Hilde (children's book, 1971, Alkmaar: Kluitman)
- Het plan van Sandra (children's book, 1972, Alkmaar: Kluitman)
- Tweetalig (1973, poetry collection, with Hans Werners (pseudonym of Gerard Nijenhuis), Assen: Hummelen)
- De geheimzinnige boerderij (children's book, 1974, Hoorn: Westfriesland)
- Liesbeth van de burgemeester (children's book, 1974, Hoorn: Westfriesland)
- Meta duikt onder (children's book, 1976, Hoorn: Westfriesland)
- Spiegelschrift (1977, poetry collection, Groningen: Nedersaksisch Instituut; second edition 1980, Groningen: Stabo/Sasland)
- Om je dood te schamen (children's book, 1978, Amsterdam/Antwerpen: Kosmos)
- Kleutervertelboek van de biebelse geschiedenis - in het Drents an de kinder verteld deur Hans Heyting (1979, Drèents translation of Anne de Vries's children's Bible, Kampen: J.H. Kok)
- Eva en Bert samen alleen (children's book, 1980, Amsterdam/Antwerpen: Kosmos)
- Marcus, een Drentse vertaoling (1981, with G.H. Kocks, G. Nijenhuis and K. Sluiter, Meppel: Het Drentse Boek)
- De overstap (children's book, 1982, Amsterdam/Antwerpen: Kosmos)
- Esther en het geheim van opa (1983, Amsterdam: Bert Bakker)
- Toegift (1983, poetry collection, Zuidwolde: Het Drentse Boek)
- Veur later, zestig gedichten van Roel Reyntjes veur zien zestigste verjaardag oetzöcht deur Hans Heyting (1983, Assen: Hummelen)
- Dubbelfocus. Een cyclus gedichten (poetry collection, 1986, Oosterhesselen: Agri Montis Pers)
