= Den Ilp =

- Village
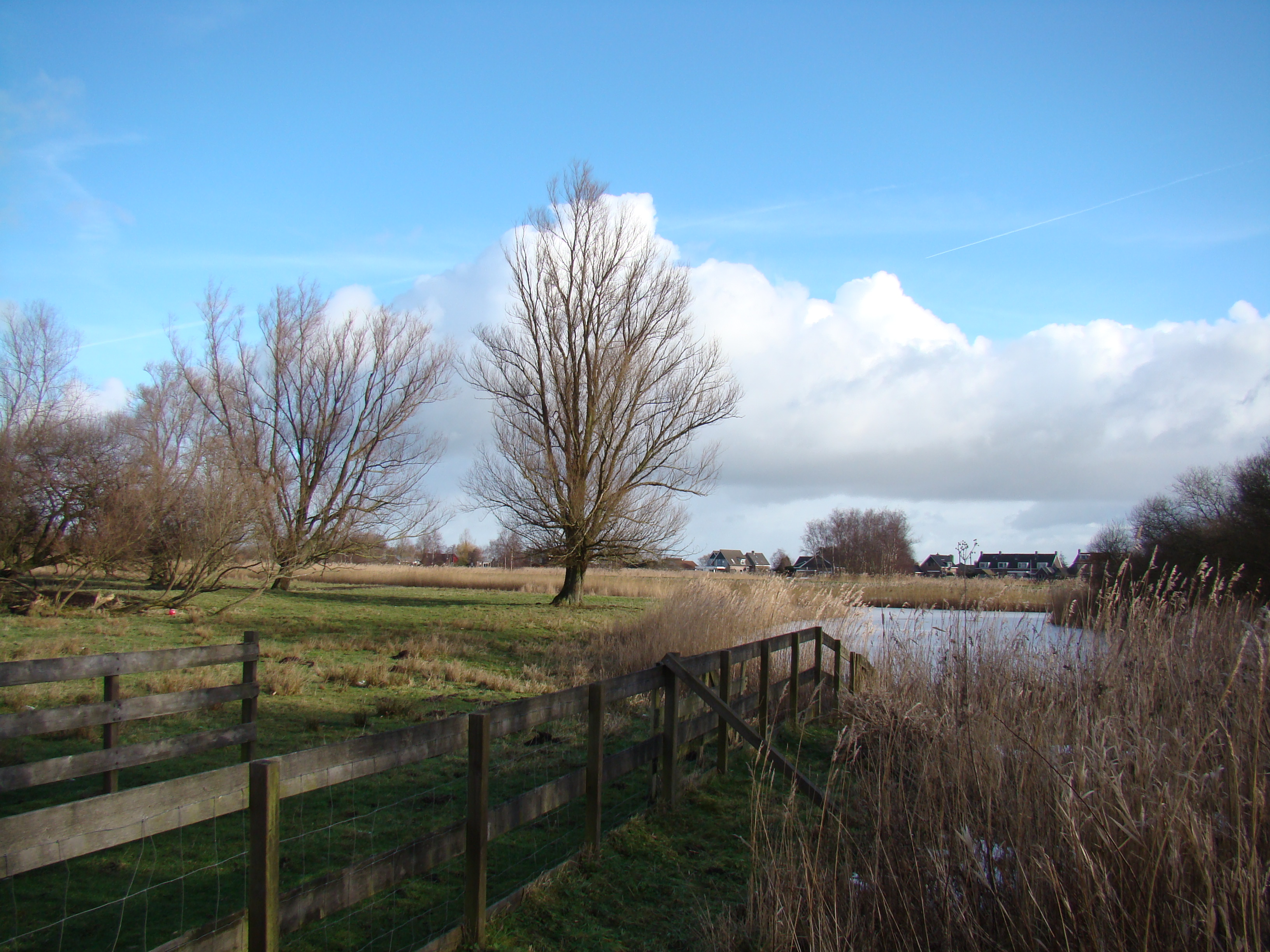
- View on Den Ilp

- Location in the Netherlands Location in the province of North Holland in the Netherlands
- Coordinates: 52°27′N 4°55′E
- Country: Netherlands
- Province: North Holland
- Municipality: Landsmeer

Area
  - Total: 12.09 km^{2} (4.67 sq mi)
- Elevation: −0.9 m (−3.0 ft)

Population (2021)
  - Total: 985
  - Density: 81.5/km^{2} (211/sq mi)
- Time zone: UTC+1 (CET)
  - Summer (DST): UTC+2 (CEST)
- Postal code: 1127
- Dialing code: 020

Den Ilp is a Dutch village. It is located in the municipality of Landsmeer, North Holland, just north of Amsterdam. The village's population was 809 as of January 2007. In the Netherlands, the village is known for its abundant lighting displays in the weeks leading up to Christmas.

== Build-up and proximity ==
The shape of Den Ilp is nearly vertical, and is mostly shaped around a single road of the same name, with two roads branching off westward halfway along Den Ilp. Den Ilp characterised as a narrow road flanked by ditches with individual bridges leading to separate houses.

The village is connected to the main village of Landsmeer. Landsmeer is in turn connected to Amsterdam and Oostzaan. To the north lies the hamlet of Purmerland, on the edge of the municipality of Landsmeer and closer to Purmerend.

== Name and history ==
Den Ilp is named Illip in local Waterlands dialect and original West Frisian. Illip originates from the word ilapa, denoting rapidly flowing water. The village was situated on the banks of a peatland stream named Ilp.

The former municipality of Den Ilp merged with two other municipalities to form the municipality of Landsmeer in 1991.

== Famous inhabitants ==
- Anton Heyboer, painter and engraver known primarily for his bigamist relationships, lived in Den Ilp. He died in 2005. His five widows continue to make the village their home.
- Saskia Laroo, acclaimed trumpeter, grew up in the village.
- Thea Dubelaar, author of children's fiction was born in Den Ilp.

== Gallery ==
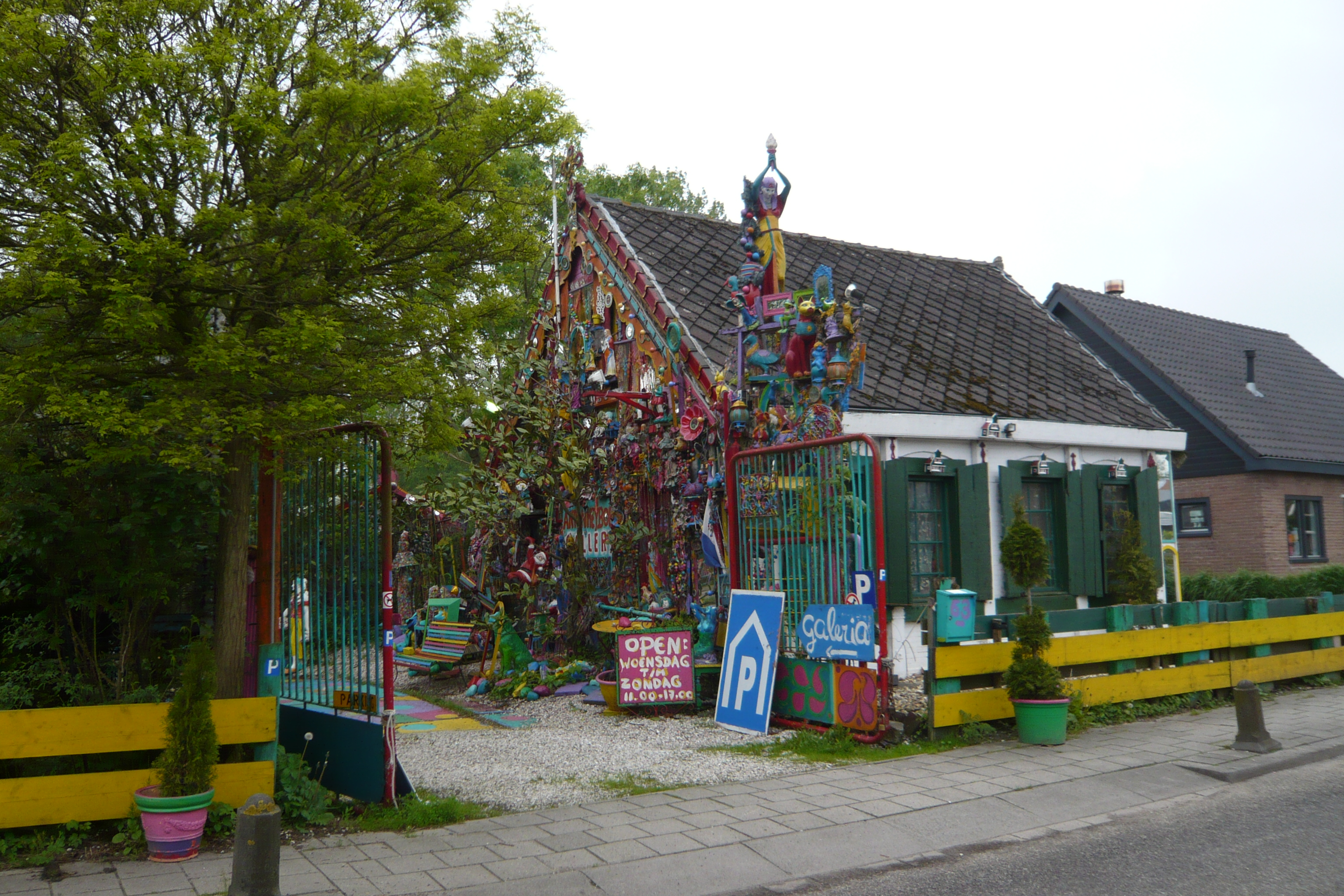
Art gallery of Anton Heyboer

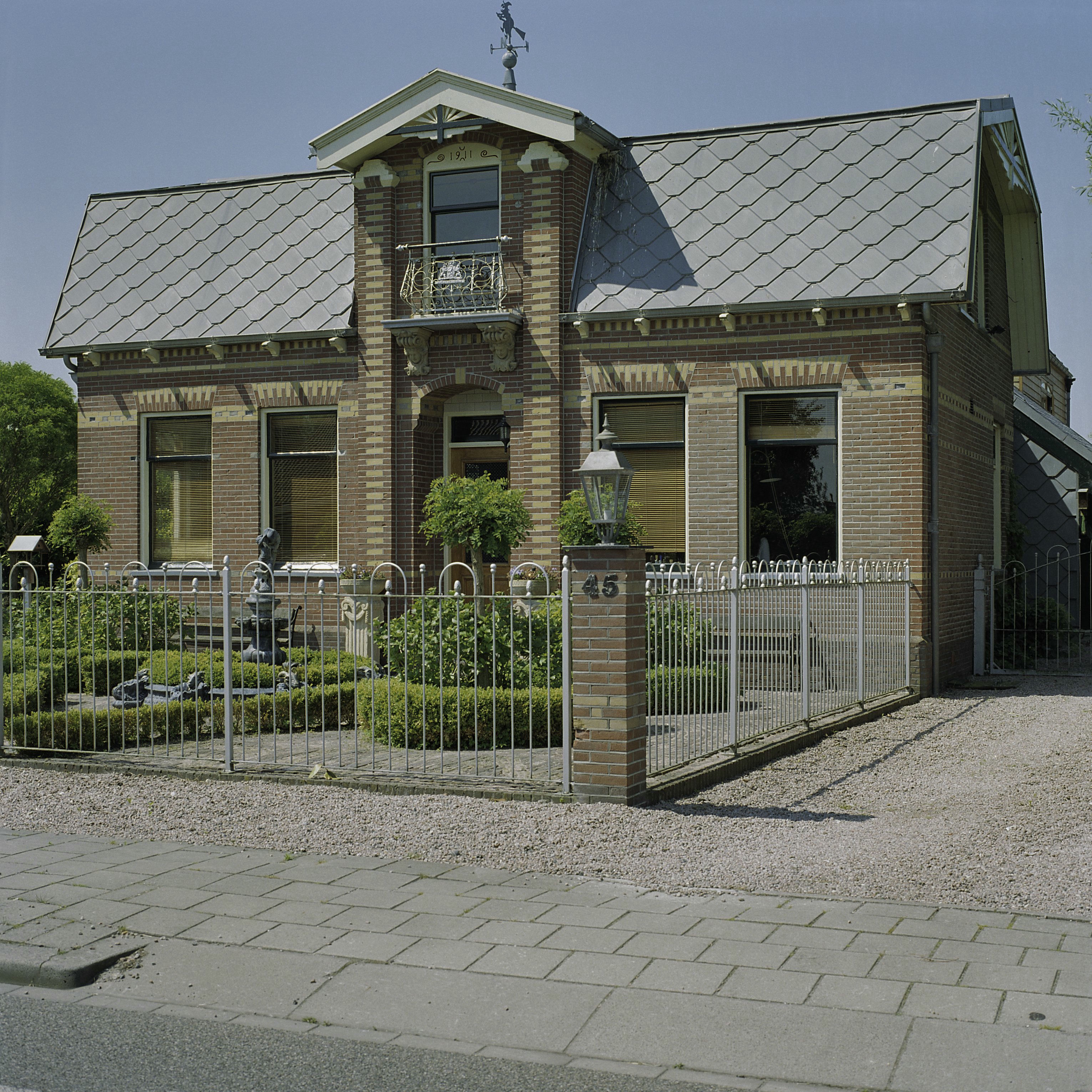
House in Den Ilp
