= Artist subsidy (Netherlands) =

An Artist Subsidy in the Netherlands refers to three former subsidy programs for Dutch artists; the BKR, the SBBK, and the WW&IK. Under these programs, artists exchanged their artworks to the organizations in return for cash subsidies. These art objects then became available for loan to the public through local Kunstuitleen shops.

The last artist subsidy program in the Netherlands ended in 2012.

== Background ==
In 1935, the Dutch government started the Voorzieningsfonds voor Kunstenaars (VVK) program. In 1938, it became the Fonds voor Bijzondere Doeleinden. Both programs were designed to provide extra resources to needy artist families. Sometimes the artists gave art objects to the organization voluntarily; this eventually became a requirement ("contraprestatie").

== SBBK ==
In 1949, the Dutch Department of Social Affairs created the Sociale Bijstand voor Beeldende Kunstenaars (SBBK). This was the first government-sponsored fund for artists.

== Stichting Beeldend Kunst (SBK) Amsterdam ==
In 1955, the artist Pieter Kooistra started a foundation in his Amsterdam house to put SBBK art works on view rather than keep them stored in "art depots". Anyone living within bicycling distance of Kooistra's house could rent an artwork for fl. 2.50 per month.

The number of members grew from 35 to 300 a year later. The success led to opening its first "gallery" in 1959. They organized shows in large public buildings, such as the Hema and the Bijenkorf. In 1969, the membership in this program rose with the introduction of a "lease-buy" option. The renter would pay a higher monthly fee for the art object in a long-term rental. At the end of the rental period, the renter would own the art object. Originally The Amsterdam "SBK" worked as a city SBBK from 1955 to 1998, when it privatized its activities.

== BKR ==
In 1956 on a national level, the SBBK changed into the Beeldende Kunstenaars Regeling (BKR).

== Kunstuitleen ==
Due to the massive influx of art works back into the koffers of the fund (that were not necessarily seen as equity), in 1972 a program called Kunstuitleen was developed. Under this program, all government buildings and individuals could loan artworks like a library system. The objective was to expose the public to modern art while reducing the inventory of art objects in storage. Most medium to large cities still have Kunstuitleen lending points.

== End of VVK ==
On 1 January 2002, the VVK merged with the Stichting Scheppende Kunstenaars (SSK) and PodiumKunstWerk (PKW), called the Kunstenaars & Cultuur en Ondernemerschap (Kunstenaars & CO). A year later, on 12 December 2002 the members of the VVK voted to end their operations per 1 January 2003.

== WW&IK ==
From 1 January 2005 to 1 January 2012, the Wet werk en inkomen kunstenaars (WW&IK) gave artists the chance to supplement their income for four years (maximum) if they were in financial difficulty.
