= Teisterbant club =

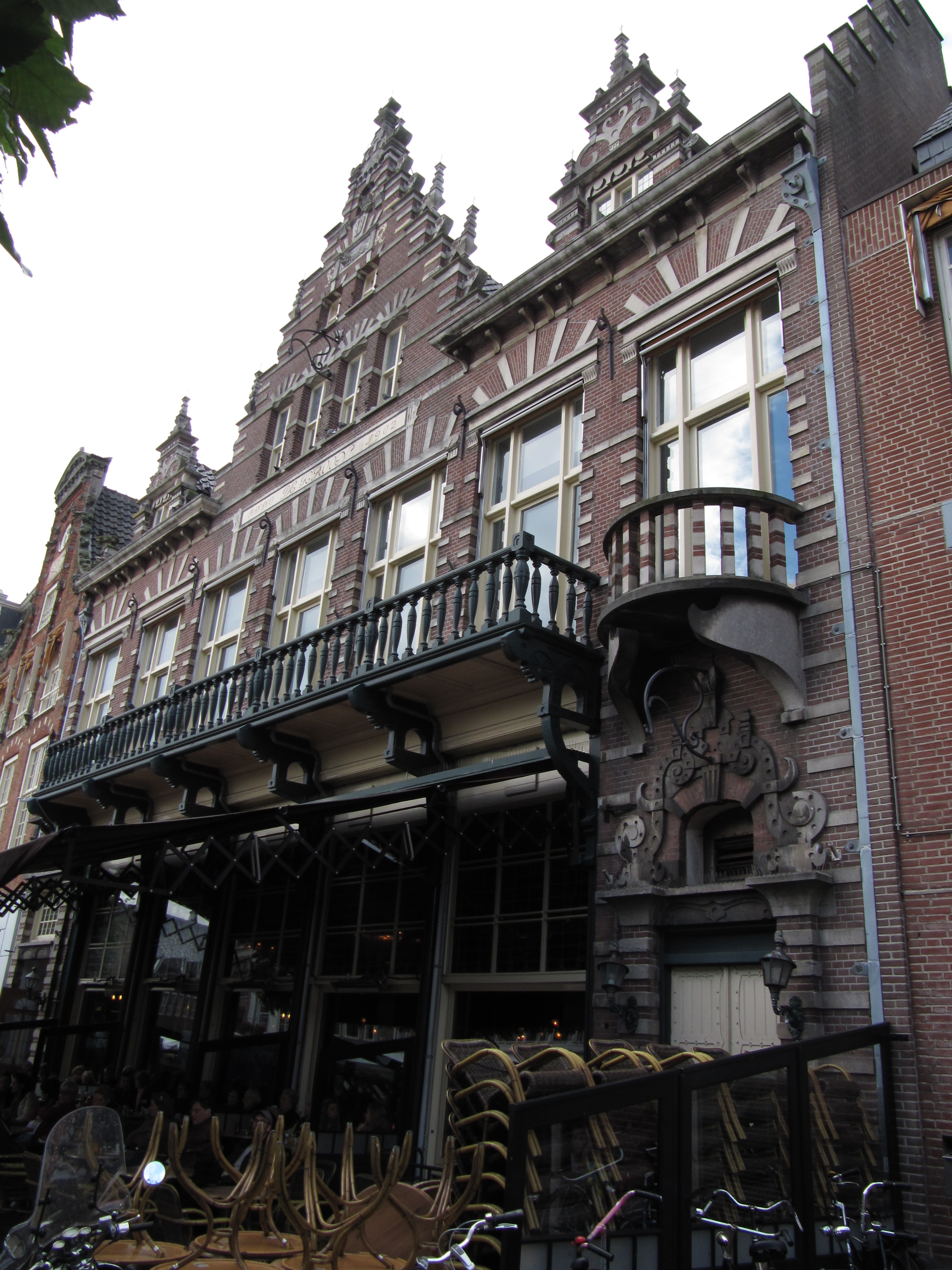
Café Brinkman on the Grote Markt in Haarlem today. The old cellar meeting place no longer exists. On the far left the facade of the former home of Bilderdijk can be seen with its commemorative gable stone.

The Teisterbant club was the name of an artists' society in Haarlem that flourished between 1950 and 1973.

In 1949 the Haarlem writer Godfried Bomans sent out a pamphlet inviting "art practitioners, art-lovers and those interested in art" to join his new society, which could hold its meetings in the basement of the restaurant "Brinkman" on the Grote Markt, Haarlem. The name was taken from the pseudonym of Willem Bilderdijk, a Haarlem writer who had believed he was descended from the Teisterbant family of the Duchy of the same name. The capital of medieval Teisterbant was Tiel. Bilderdijk died in the house next door to Brinkman and the facade has a commemorative gable stone to Bilderdijk.

At the opening of the club, in March 1950, Bomans's Teisterbant had managed to attract 180 members, among them Lodewijk van Deyssel (who died that year), Mari Andriessen, Harry Mulisch and Anton Heyboer. The club organized literary evenings, film evenings, music evenings and chess competitions. The club was disbanded soon after Bomans died.

In September 2009, the "New Artists Society Teisterbant" was established that also holds its meetings in Restaurant Brinkman. Because the basement rooms no longer exist since a major reconstruction of the housing block, the new group must meet upstairs.
