= Kees Verwey =

Dutch painter

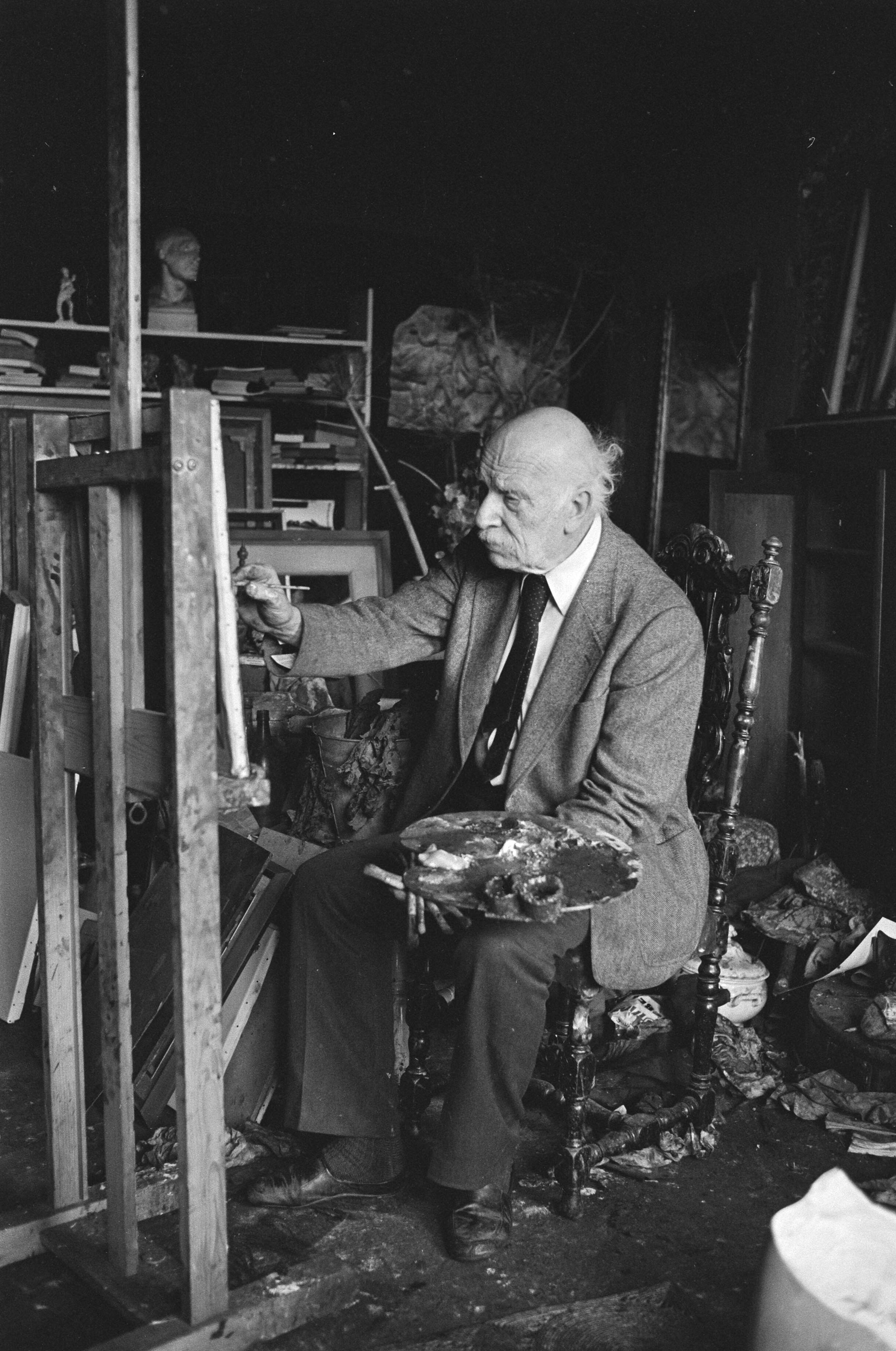
- Verwey in 1980
- Born: April 20, 1900
- Died: July 23, 1995 (aged 95)
- Occupation: Painter

Kees Verwey (April 20, 1900 – July 23, 1995) was a Dutch painter who was productive well into old age.

== Biography ==
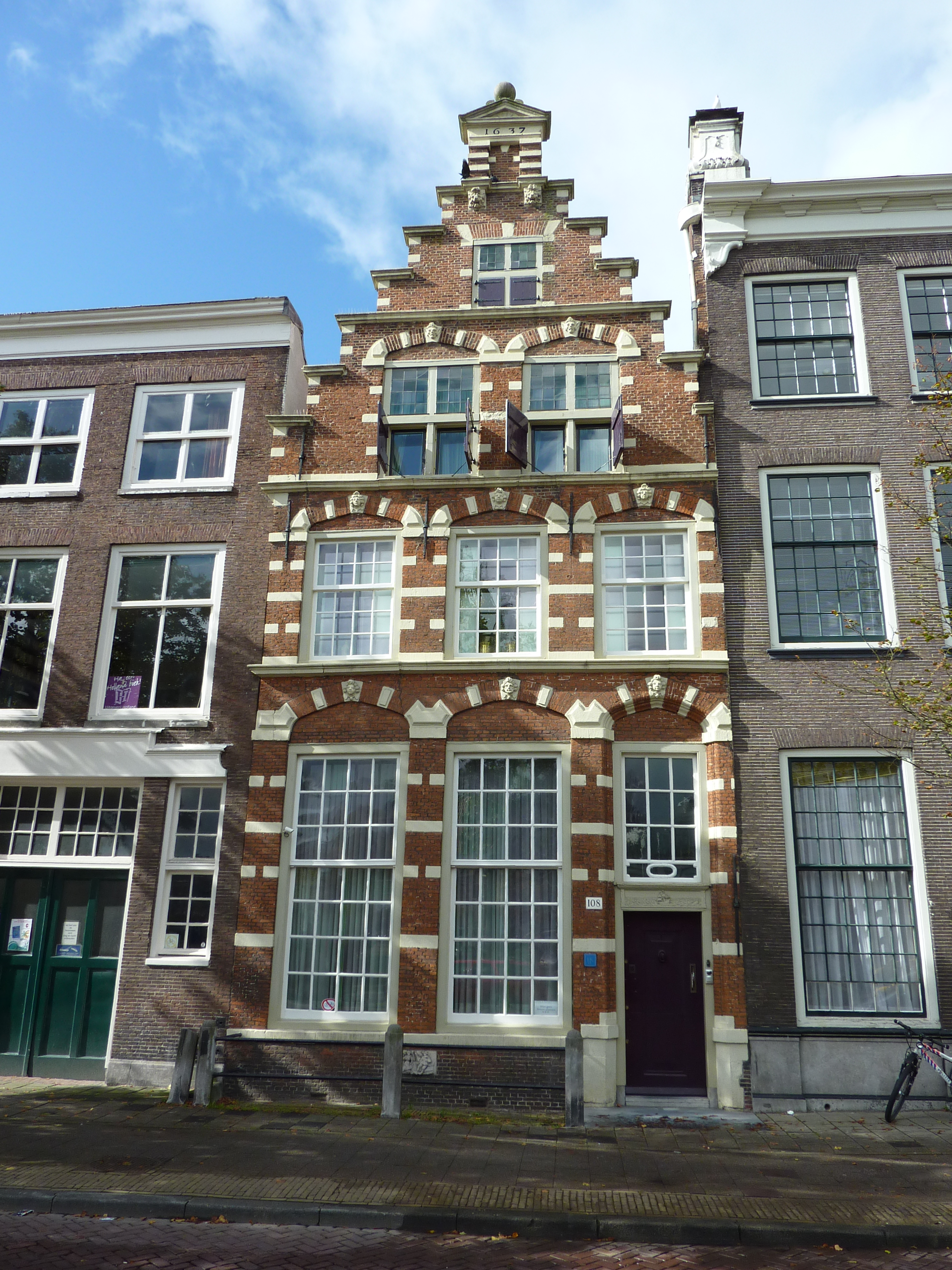
Spaarne 108, former workshop of Kees Verwey in Haarlem

He was born in Amsterdam and was the nephew of the poet Albert Verwey and the architect Hendrik Petrus Berlage. According to the RKD he was a pupil of Henri Frédéric Boot, Johannes Hendricus Jurres, and Samuel Jessurun de Mesquita. He was heavily influenced by the Hague School and Impressionism. His big break came in 1931 when his work was exhibited along with that of other contemporary Haarlem artists (such as Hendrik van den Eijnde). The exhibition was held in the newly created Modern art gallery of the Frans Hals Museum located behind the main museum (today the gallery for the schutterstukken). He was a member of the Haarlem artist society "Kunst Zij Ons Doel", the "Kennemer Kunstenaarskring, and "Hollandse Aquarellistenkring". He married Jeanne Tilbusscher in 1951.

The Stedelijk Museum in Amsterdam showed his work in the late 70s, and in Haarlem his work was shown in 1985 and 1990. In 1989 his work was shown in the Dordrechts Museum and in 1990 in the Gemeentemuseum Den Haag. In 1993 the Gemeente Haarlem accepted a gift of his entire oeuvre and named the new art hall on the Grote Markt, Haarlem after him. Verwey had given this gift in 1984 with the condition that a proper home for it needed to be created. When the city stalled in finding a location, Verwey financed the remodelling of a centrally located hall himself and brought his collection together with the Frans Hals Museum in a foundation that he also ran himself until his death.

His pupils were Mieke Burgers-Witteveen, Jules Chapon, Joop Dam (1922–1997), Jan Engelman, Henk Fonville, Frans Funke, Jan van Geem, Cor Hak, Kees de Jager, Hugo Liebe, Henk van der Linden, Hanne Meijer-de Heer, Jan Michels, Wim Steijn, and Karla Wenckebach. He died in Haarlem.
