= Galerie Espace =

Galerie Espace was a Dutch art gallery for contemporary art that existed from 1956 to 2011. The gallery was founded in Haarlem and moved to Amsterdam in 1960.

== History ==
The gallery was founded in November 1956 in Haarlem by Eva Bendien (1921-2000) and Polly Chapon-Meure, wife of the sculptor and glazier Jules Chapon (1914-2007). The gallery, which was started in Chapon's studio at Klein Heiligland 36, was soon seen as groundbreaking. It was the first gallery in the Netherlands to show contemporary art.

The opening exhibition in November 1956 featured work by Karel Appel, Corneille, Wessel Couzijn, Emilio Scanvio, Serge Vandercam and Theo Wolvecamp. The following year in April 1957, Karel Appel had a solo exhibition, which was opened by Harry Mullisch.
