= Proot =

Proot is a surname. Notable people with the surname include:

- Aimé Proot (1890–1959), Belgian long-distance runner
- Johanna Maria Proot-Sterck (1868–1945), Dutch historian and teacher
- Roger Proot (1905–1971), Belgian footballer
