= View of Bentheim Castle =

Painting by Jacob van Ruisdael

Bentheim Castle
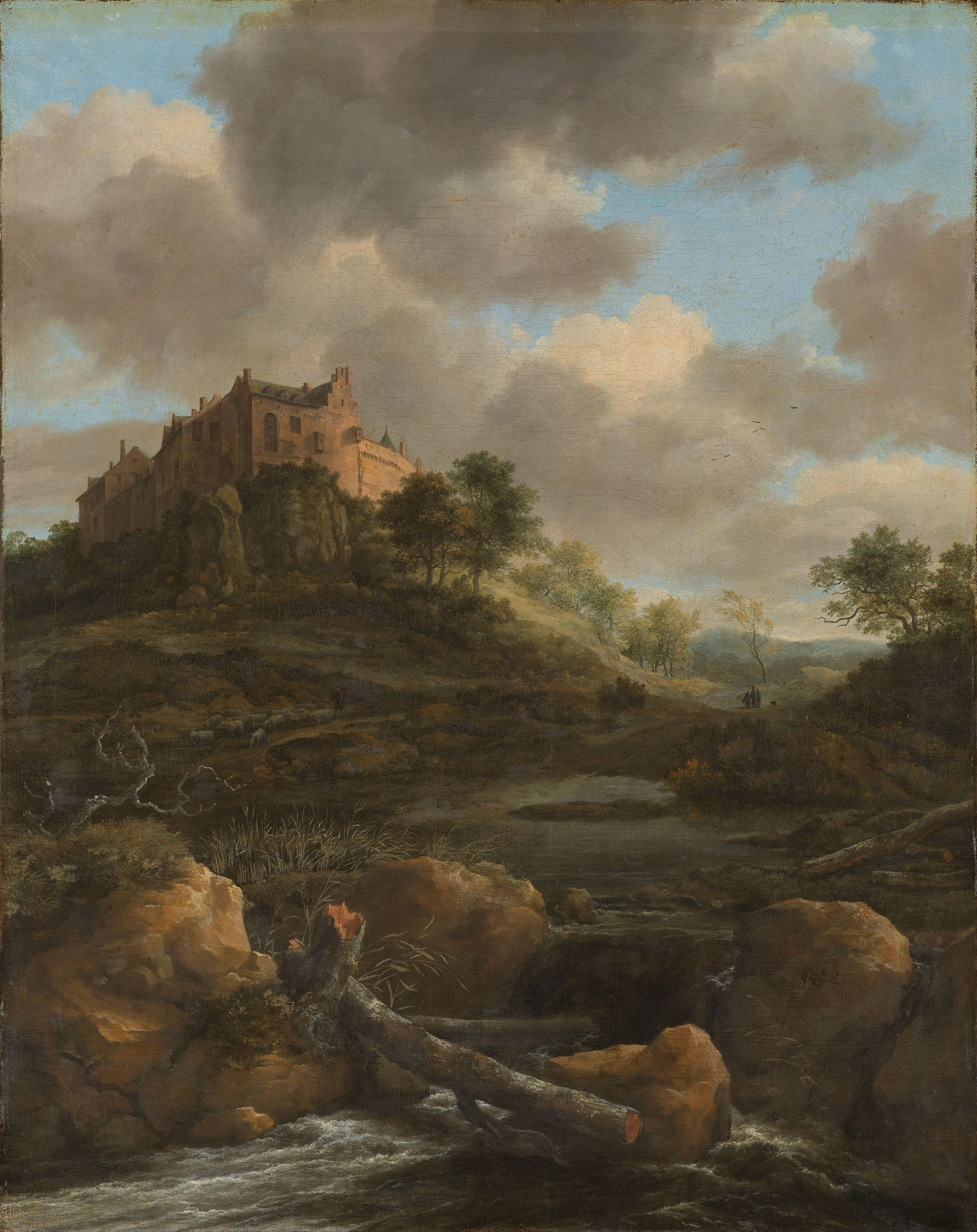
- Artist: Jacob van Ruisdael
- Year: 1650s
- Medium: Oil on canvas
- Dimensions: 68 cm × 54 cm (27 in × 21 in)
- Location: Rijksmuseum; Amsterdam

View of Bentheim Castle (c. 1650s) is an oil on canvas painting of Burg Bentheim by the Dutch landscape painter Jacob van Ruisdael. It is an example of Dutch Golden Age painting and is now in the collection of the Rijksmuseum.

This painting was documented by Hofstede de Groot in 1911, who wrote; "21. THE CASTLE OF BENTHEIM. Sm. 16. The castle stands in the left middle distance on the rocky summit of a hill. To the right is a valley through which runs a road. In front are masses of rock between which flows a stream forming a little waterfall. On the left bank a shattered tree-trunk, beside the stump, lies diagonally across the stream. Farther back the stream widens; on the left bank a shepherd drives his sheep forward. A fine picture, full of light. [Pendant to 319.]

Signed in full to the right on a rock; canvas, 27 inches by 21 inches. Engraved by W. Unger. Sales. G. G. Baron Taets van Amerongen, Amsterdam, July 3, 1805, No. 35 (750 florins, Josi). p. de Smeth van Alphen, Amsterdam, August i, 1810, No. 86 (740 florins, Coclers); pendant to No. 85. In the Rijksmuseum, Amsterdam, 1910 catalogue, No. 2080; it was there in 1835 (Sm., who valued it at £ 350)."

This scene is very similar to other paintings Ruisdael made in this period of Burg Bentheim and these often showed the castle on a high hill, though in reality it is only slightly elevated above the surrounding plain.

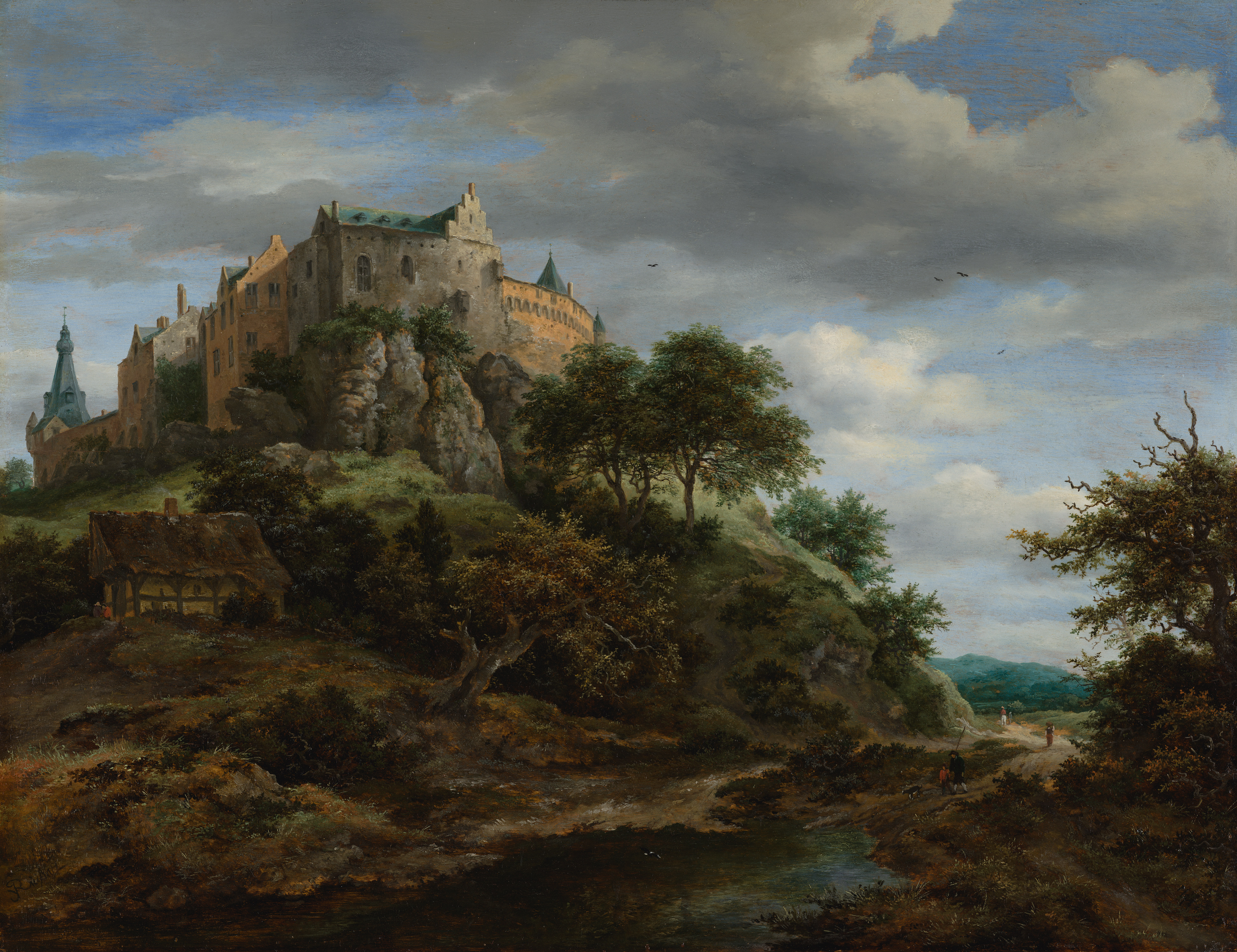
Mauritshuis.

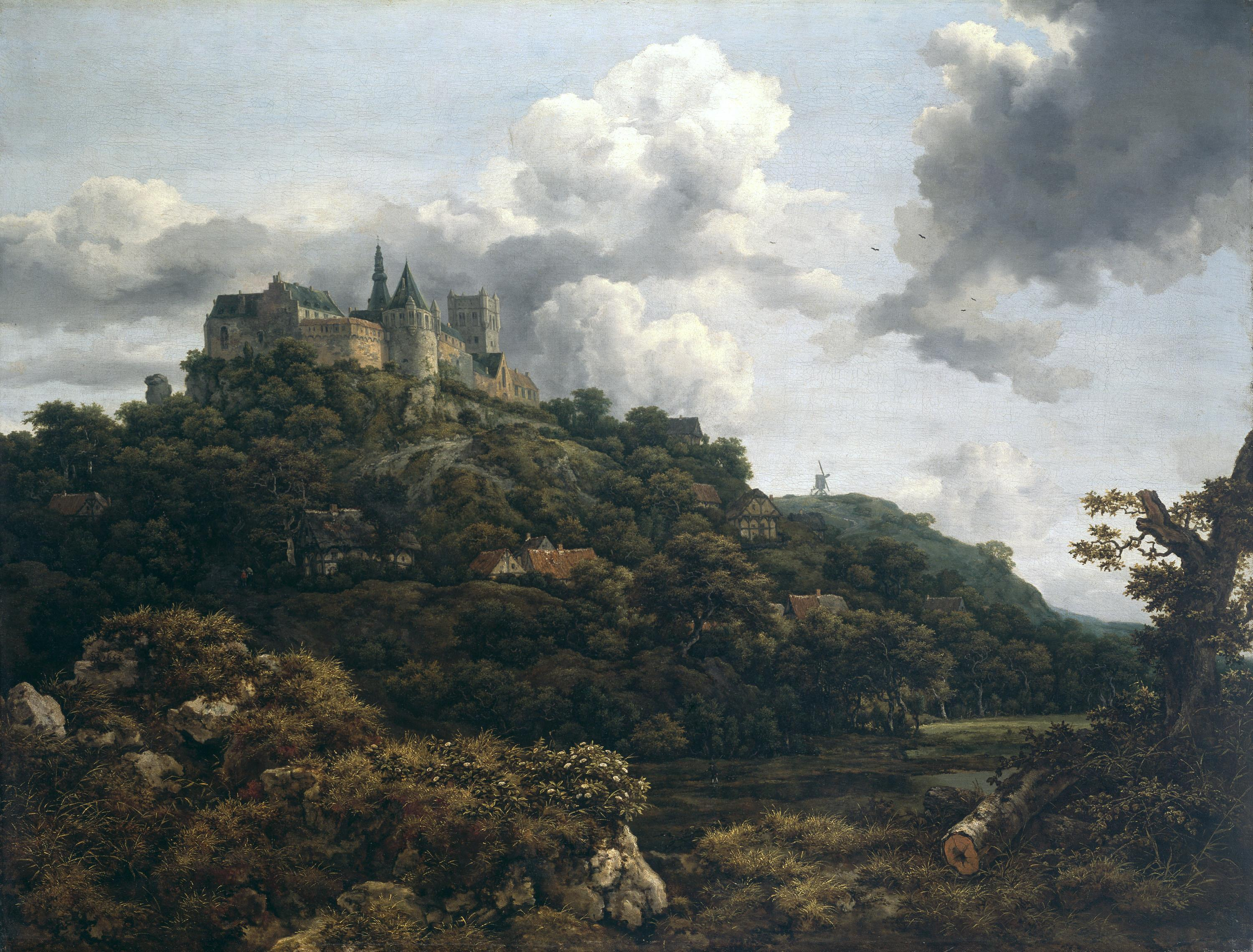
National Gallery of Ireland.

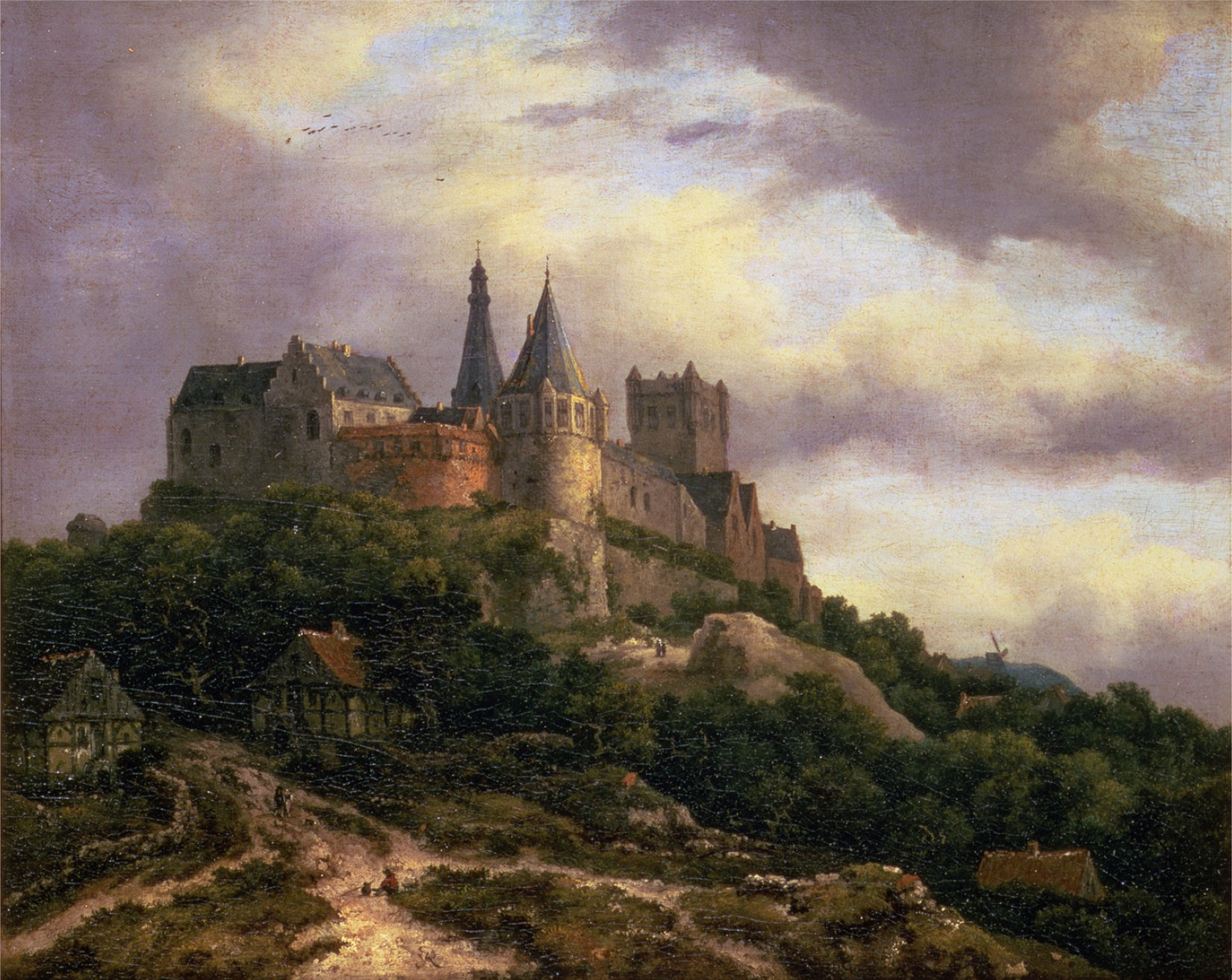
Guildhall Art Gallery.

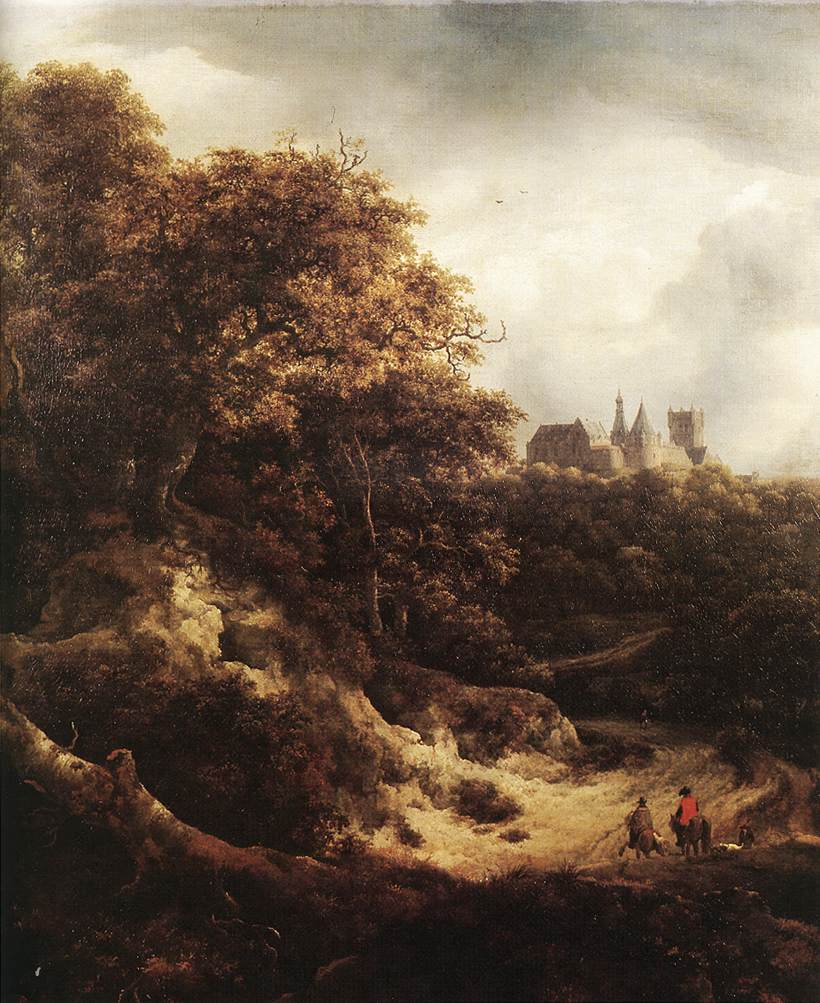
A View of Burg Bentheim (1651) by Jacob van Ruisdael

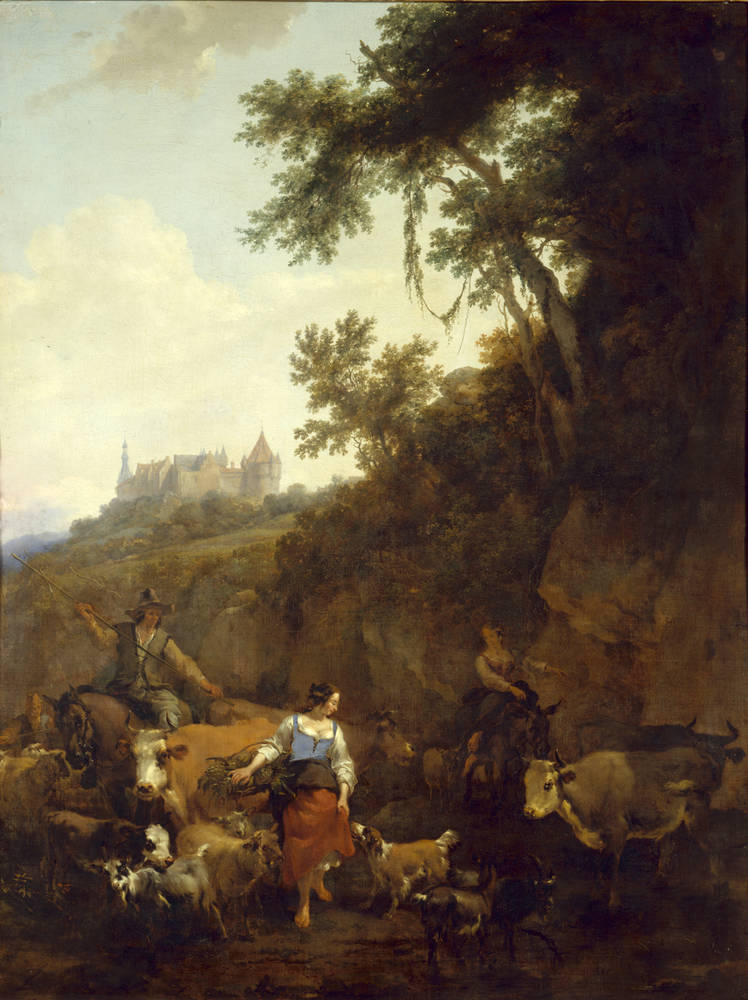
A View of Burg Bentheim (c. 1656) Nicolaas Berchem

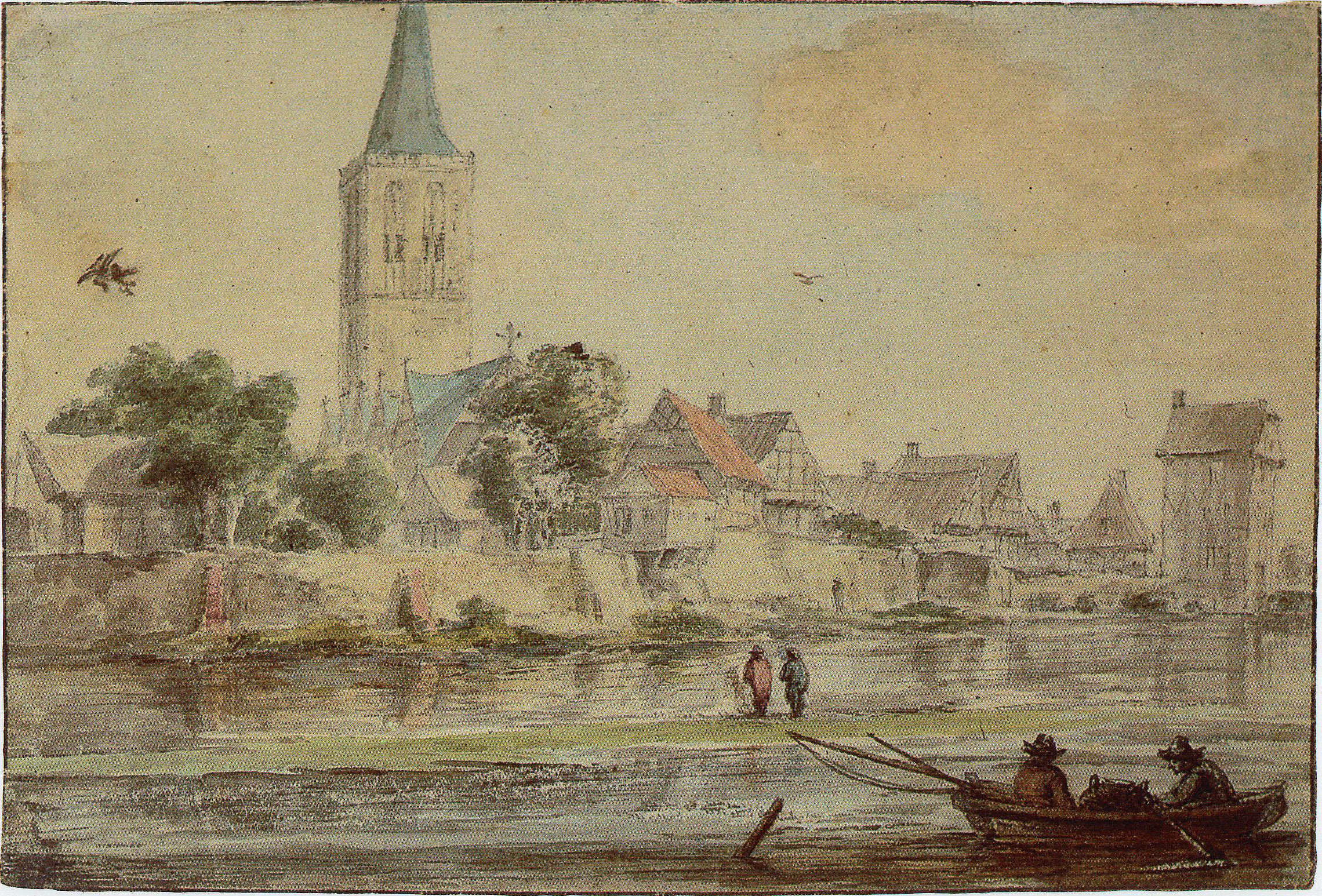
Ruisdael's view of the neighboring town of Schüttorf from the east over the Vechte, c. 1650

Little is known of Ruisdael's trip to Bentheim. It is speculated that he took a grand tour like many of his contemporaries did, but they were mostly interested in travel to Italy and headed southwards, not eastwards as Ruisdael had done. Sources are unclear about the reason the artist would travel to Bentheim to paint it. Bentheim is a small German town near the Dutch border about 26 kilometers beyond Ootmarsum, a town Ruisdael painted, and adjoins the town of Schüttorf, which Ruisdael sketched from across the river Vechte. In those days, people of Haarlem and Amsterdam were more likely to travel by foot or by trekschuit than by horse and buggy. Ruisdael's paintings also often show people walking along sandy tracks or traveling in boats, but only the cart tracks in his paintings show the traffic from other forms of transport. If he travelled eastwards by boat, then this could explain why he made so many sketches of water mills and sluices. There has been speculation that Ruisdael accompanied an expedition to acquire Bentheimer sandstone for building the new Amsterdam Town Hall, an ambitious project by mayor Nicolaes Tulp that employed many artists, including the Haarlem architect Jacob van Campen as master builder. Bentheimer sandstone was a popular product being used to build canal mansions along the new canals of Amsterdam. In Haarlem, the facade of the house of Pieter Teyler van der Hulst is cladded with Bentheimer sandstone, and though this was probably done later in the 1740s, it shows how the popularity of this material overshadowed the use of Namur stone from Belgium, the material used earlier in the 17th century for cladding of the Waag, Haarlem, which is a few doors down from Teyler's house. However it is also entirely plausible that Ruisdael was invited to the castle to paint it, but little is known of the art collection in the castle at that time.

Ruisdael was even tempted to make a dramatic sweeping version of the castle that was copied almost in mirror image by Haarlem contemporary Nicolaes Berchem, called "his great friend" by Ruisdael biographer Arnold Houbraken. It is assumed that the artists travelled together, but no archival evidence beyond dated artworks survive which support this.

== See also ==
- List of paintings by Jacob van Ruisdael
