= Damstraat, Haarlem =

Street in Haarlem, the Netherlands

Damstraat
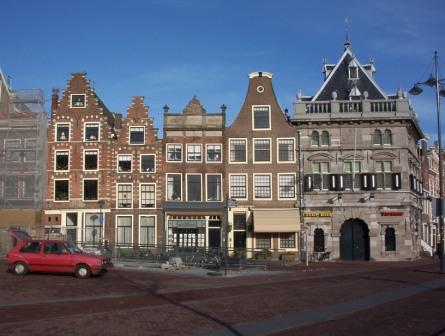
- Northeast side of Damstraat with the Waag on the right
- Interactive map of Damstraat
- Length: 0.35 km (0.22 mi)
- Location: Haarlem-Centrum
- From: Spaarne
- To: Spekstraat

The Damstraat is a street in Haarlem, connecting the Spaarne river to the "Lange Veerstraat", "Klokhuisplein" and the "Oude Groenmarkt" located behind the St. Bavochurch.

The street is lined with rijksmonuments, most notably the Waag, a former weighing house and a landmark on the Spaarne. Additionally, the fundatiehuis, the former home of Pieter Teyler van der Hulst and the front door of the museum founded in his name from 1778 until 1865, is located here. The new Haarlem court of Justice, housed in a modern building called the Appelaar, is also situated on this street. The Appelaar was constructed on the site where the Joh. Enschedé printing company resided for three centuries. Under the Damstraat, a large parking garage was realized during the construction of the Appelaar in the 1990s.

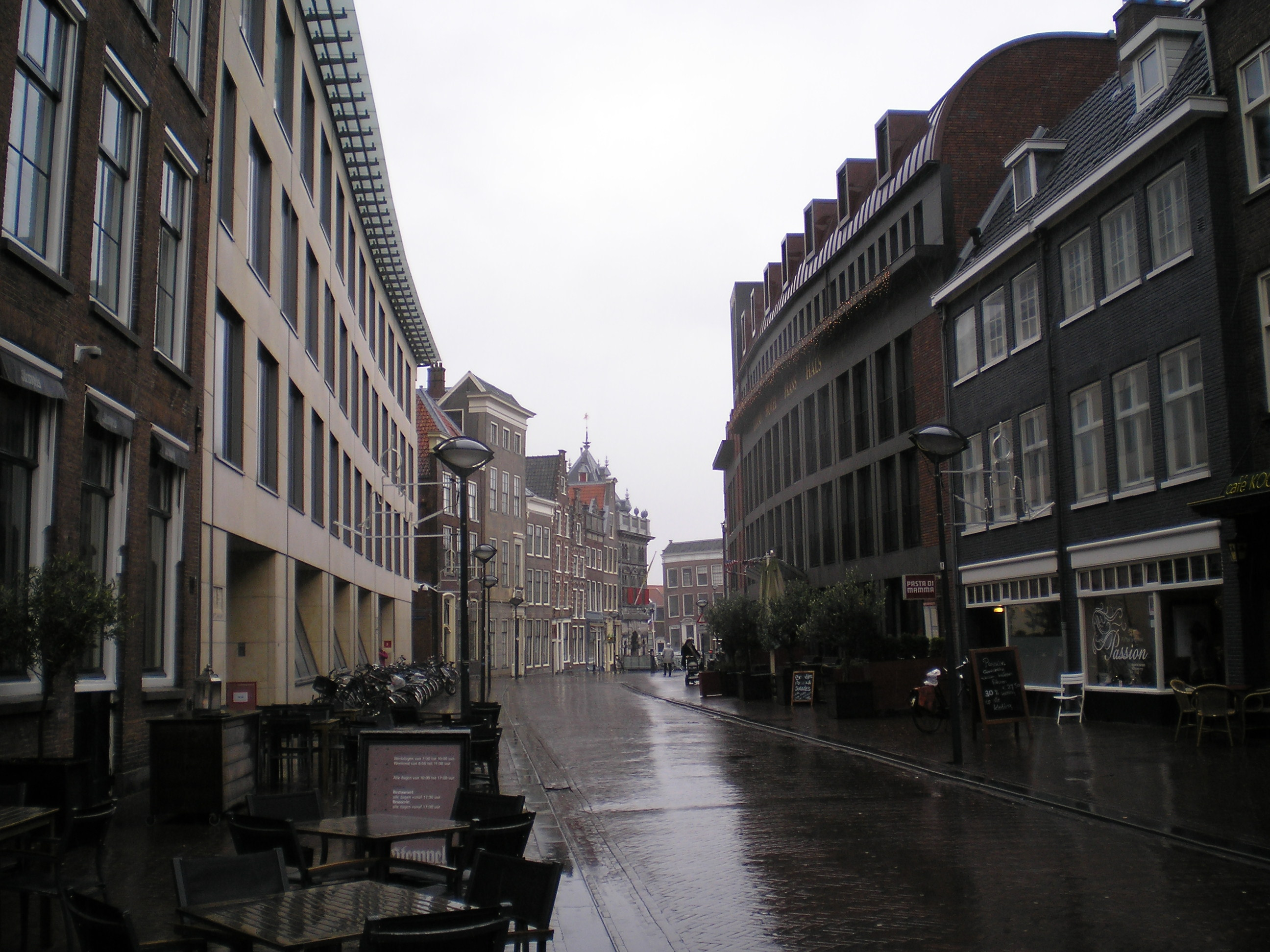
Damstraat in Haarlem

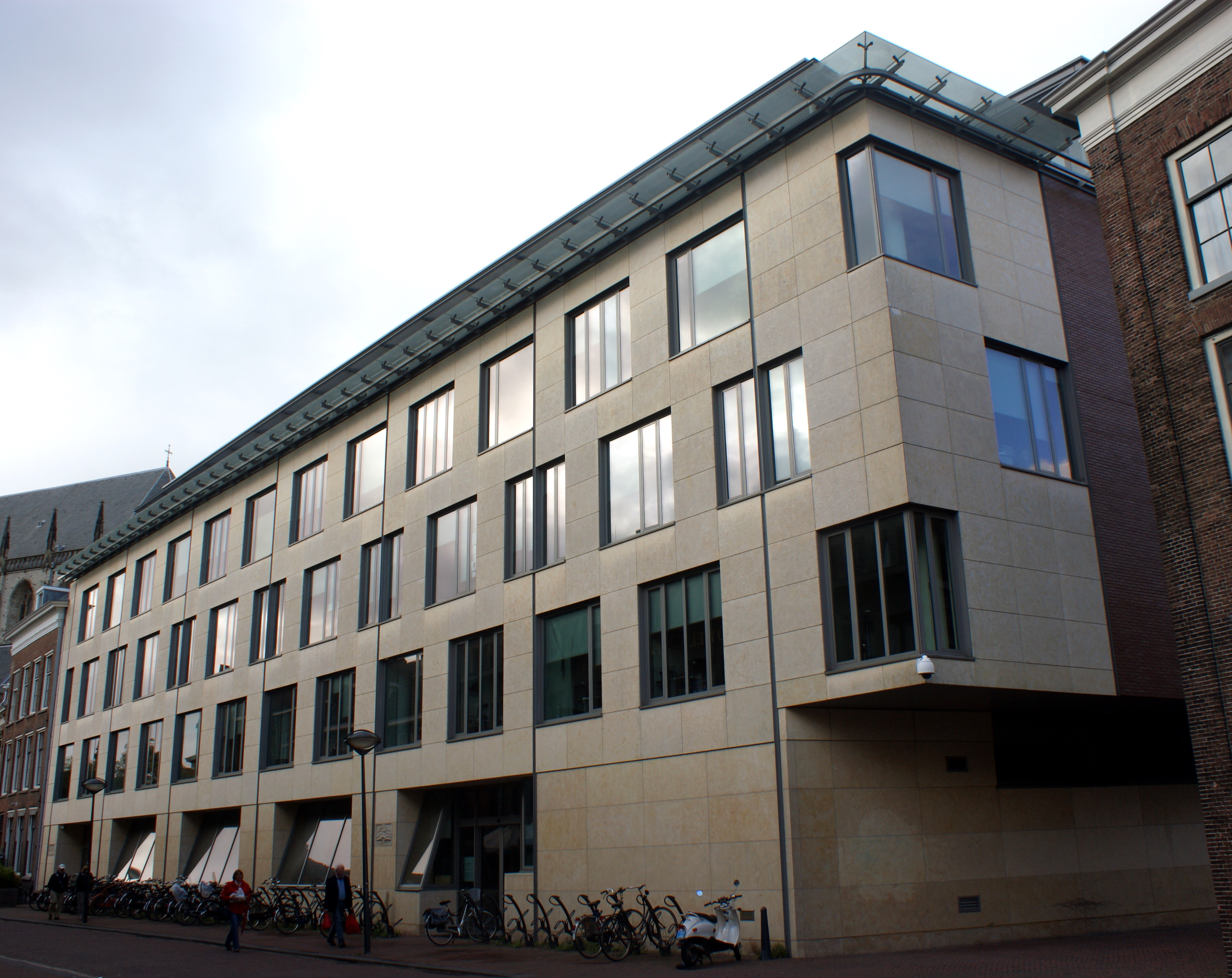
The Haarlem Court

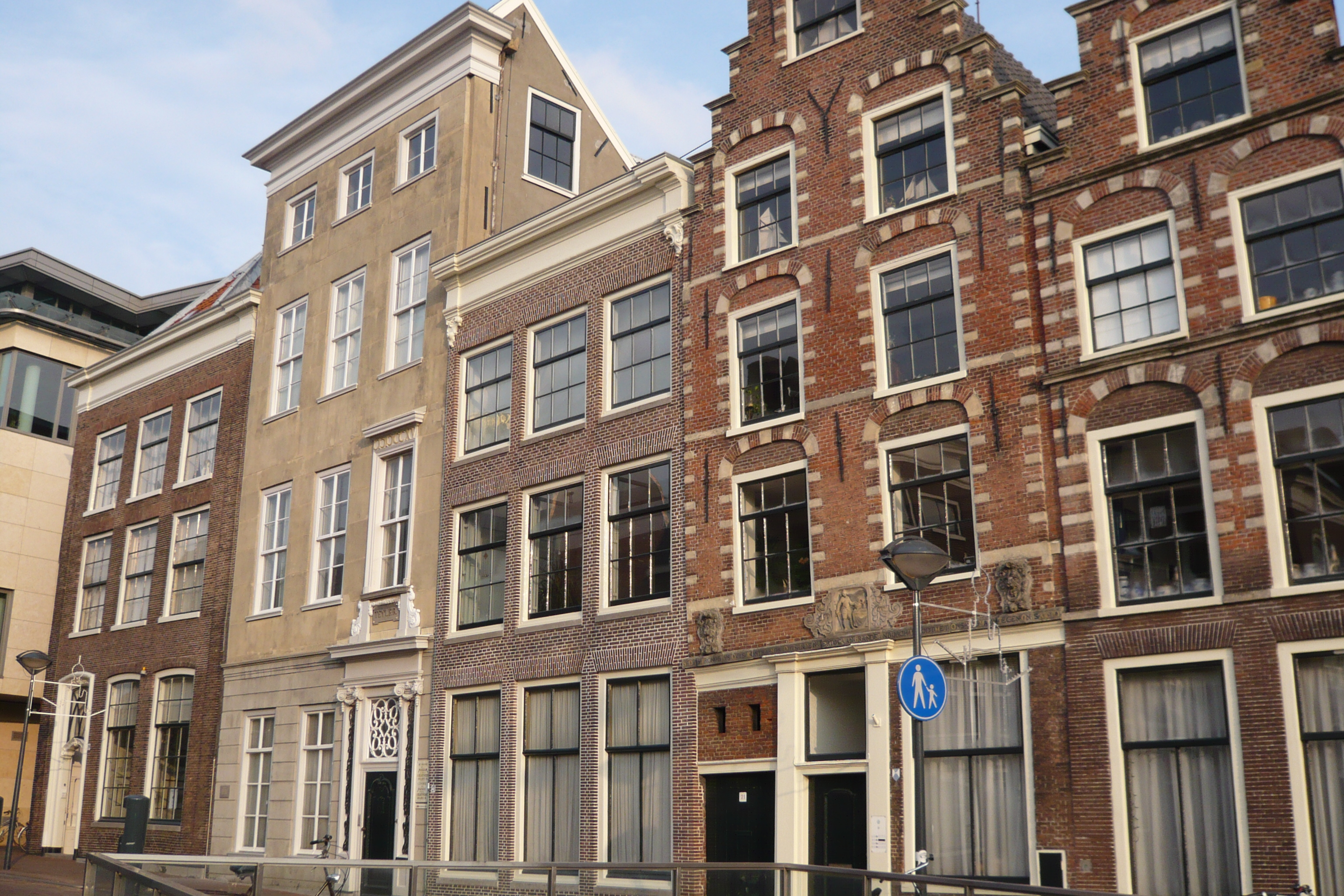
Damstraat with Fundatiehuis

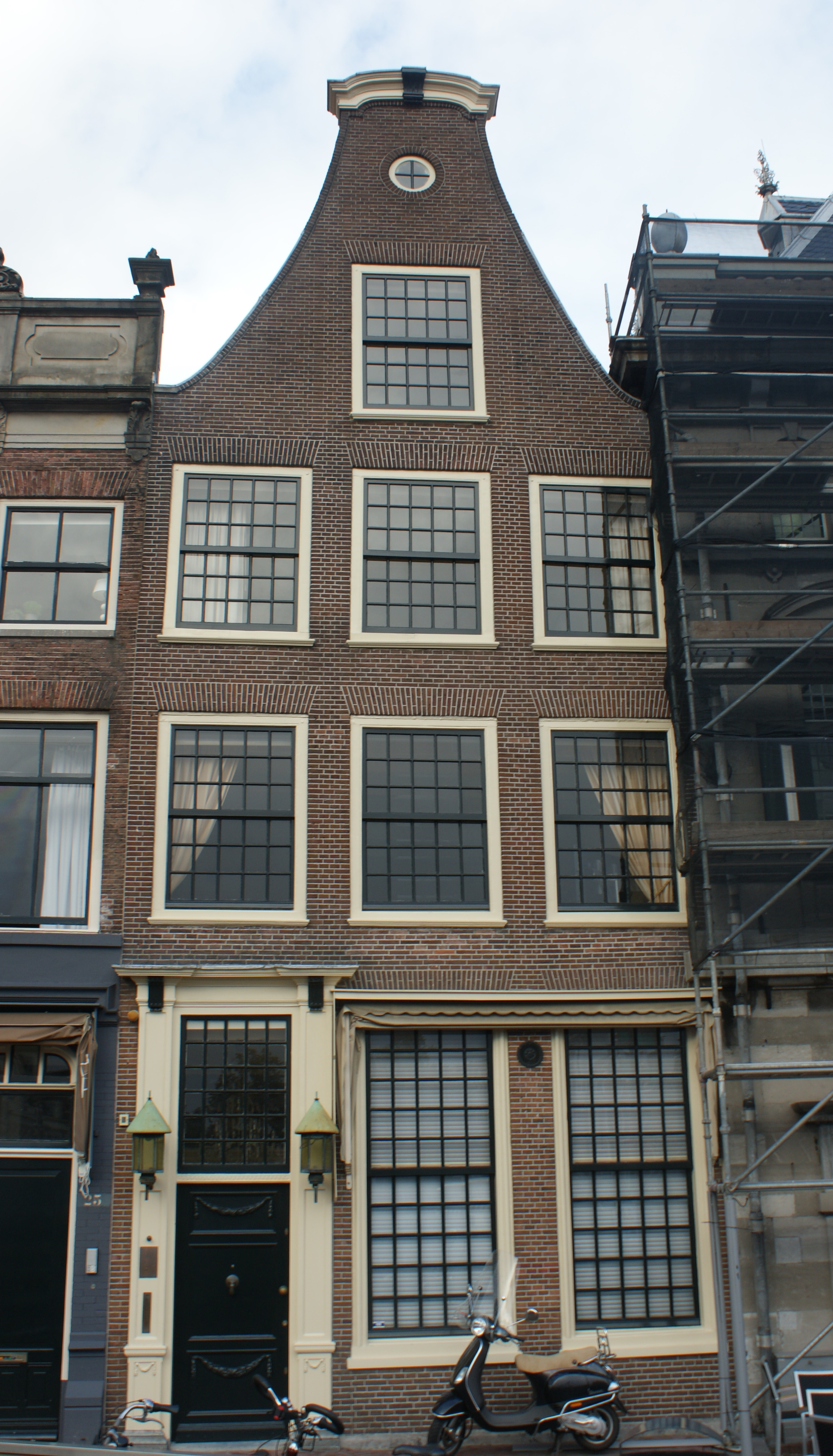
Damstraat 27

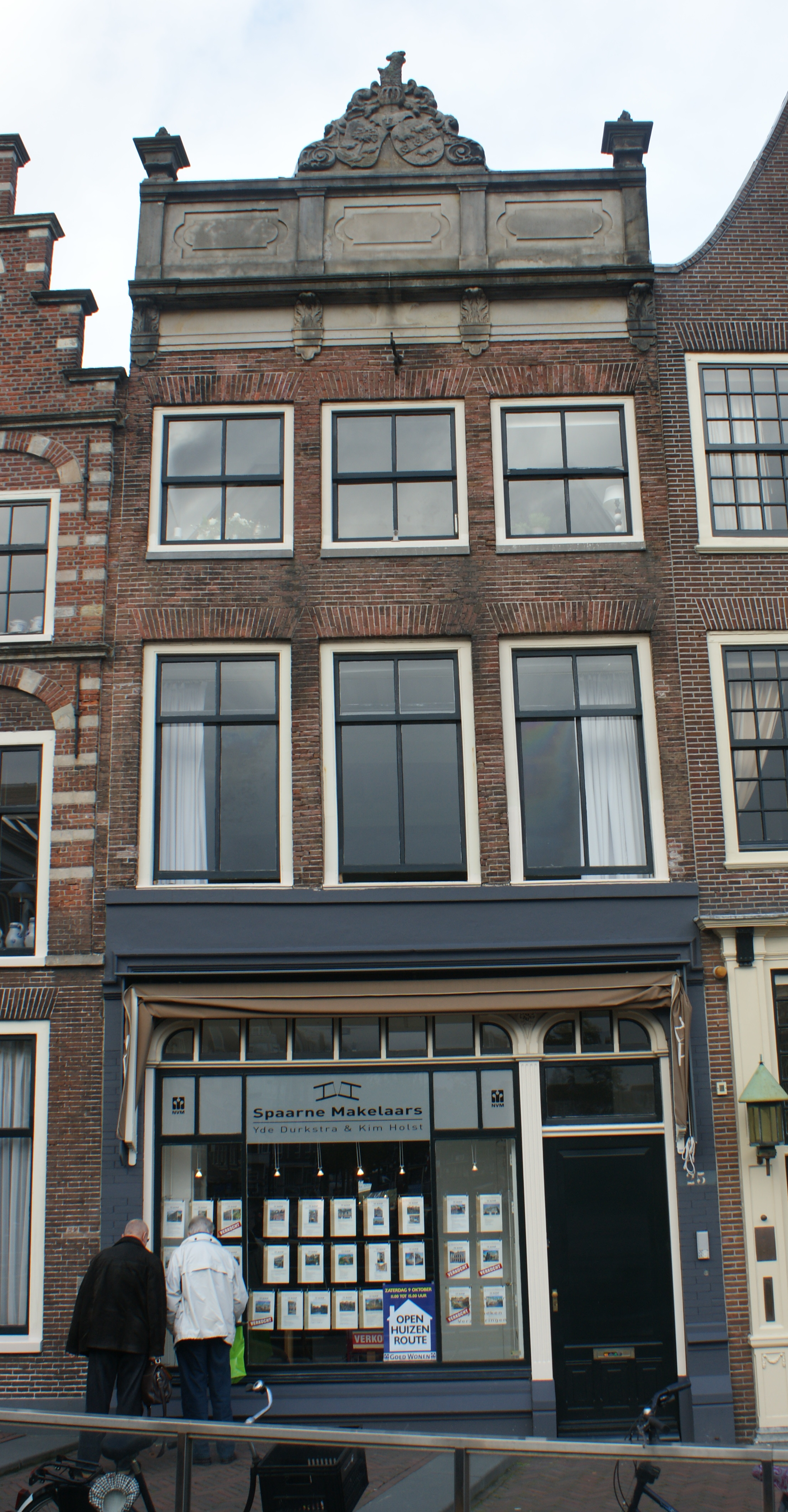
Damstraat 25

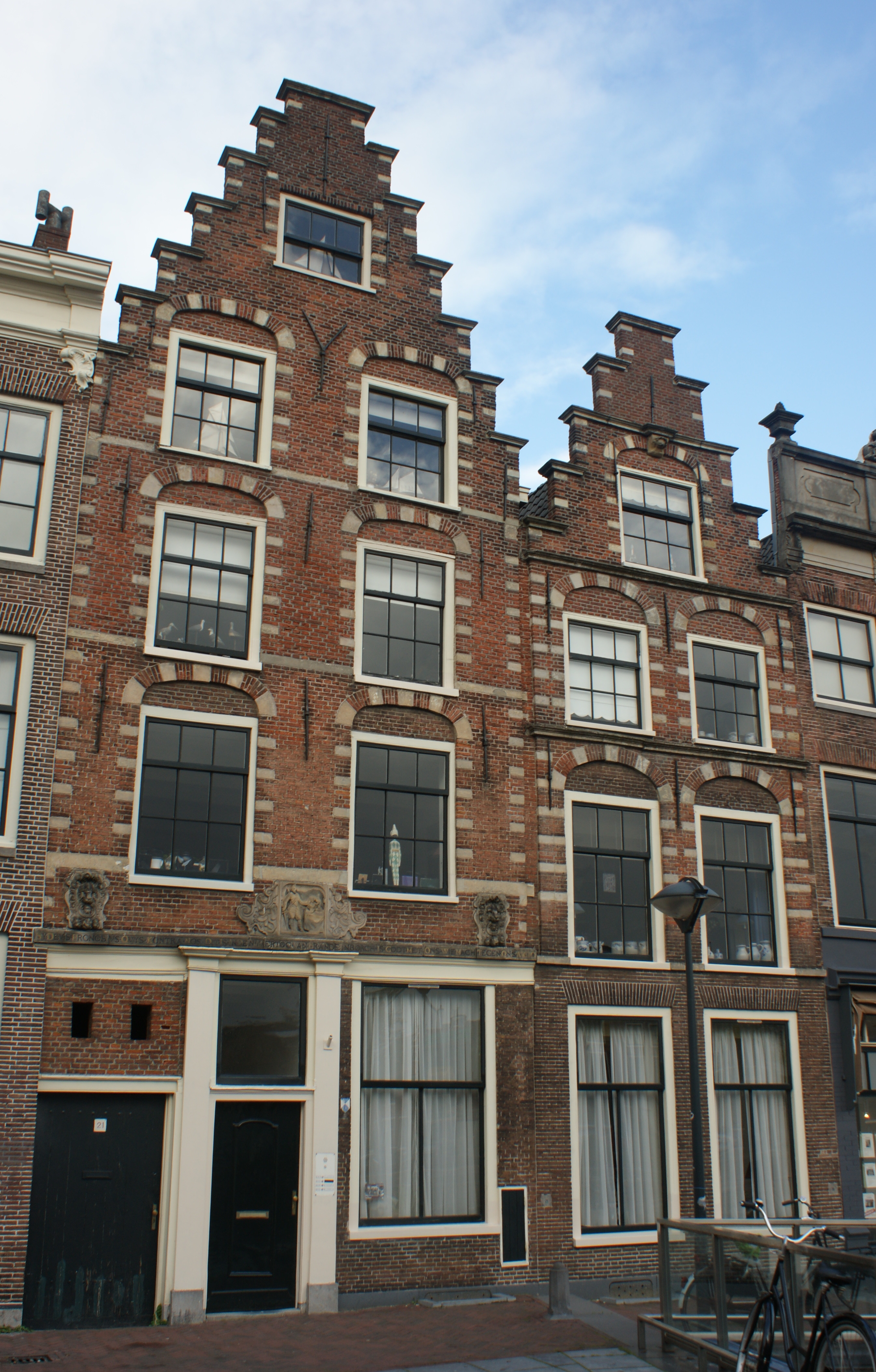
Damstraat 23

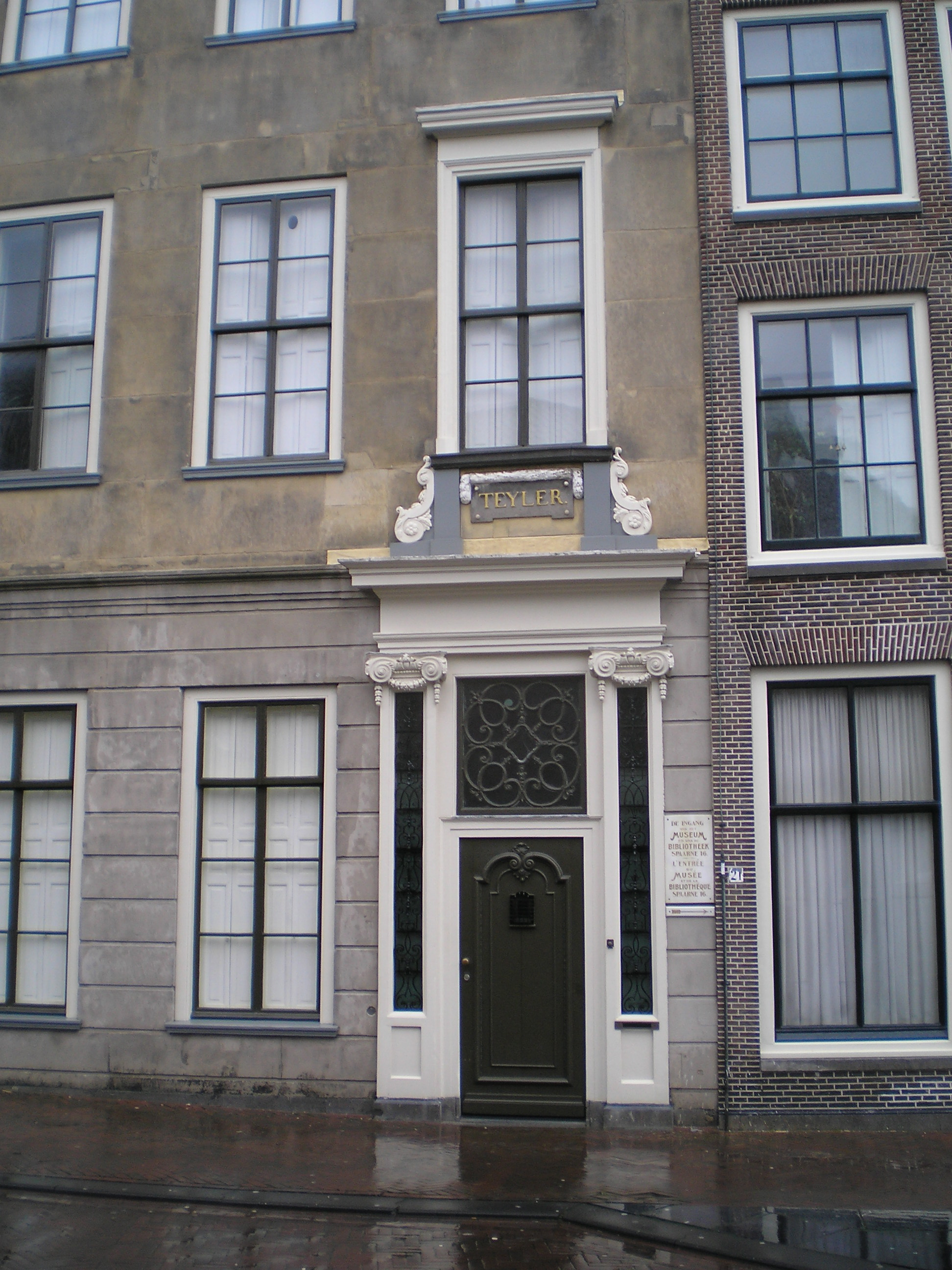
Teylers Fundatiehuis Damstraat 21

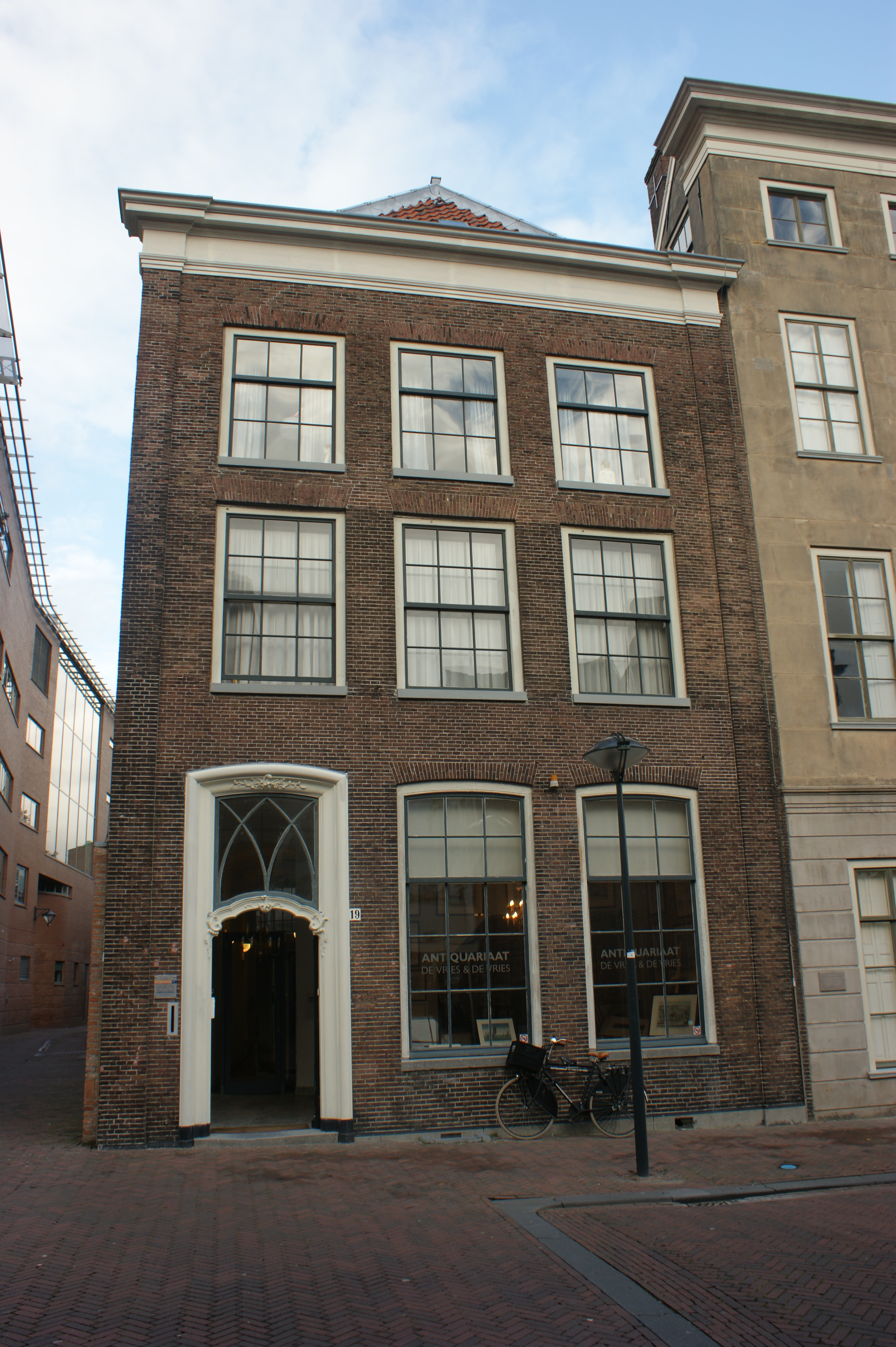
Damstraat 19
