= De Adriaan, Haarlem =

Windmill museum in Haarlem, Netherlands

Coordinates: 52°23′02″N 4°38′34″E

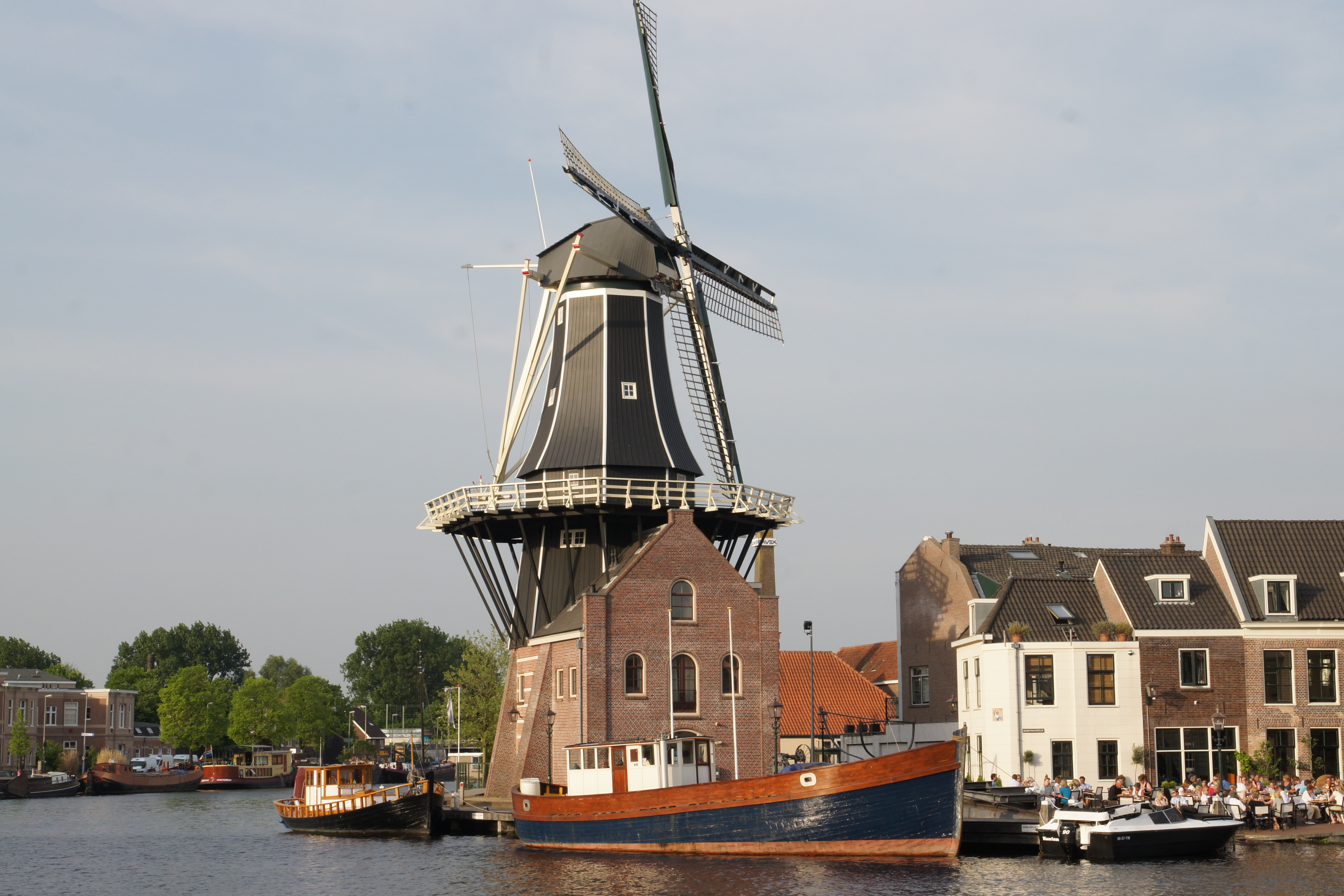
Windmill De Adriaan

De Adriaan (Dutch pronunciation: [də ˈʔaːdrijaːn]) is a windmill in the Netherlands that burnt down in 1932 and was rebuilt in 2002. The original windmill dates from 1779 and the mill has been a distinctive part of the skyline of Haarlem for centuries.

== History of De Adriaan ==
=== Goevrouwetoren ===
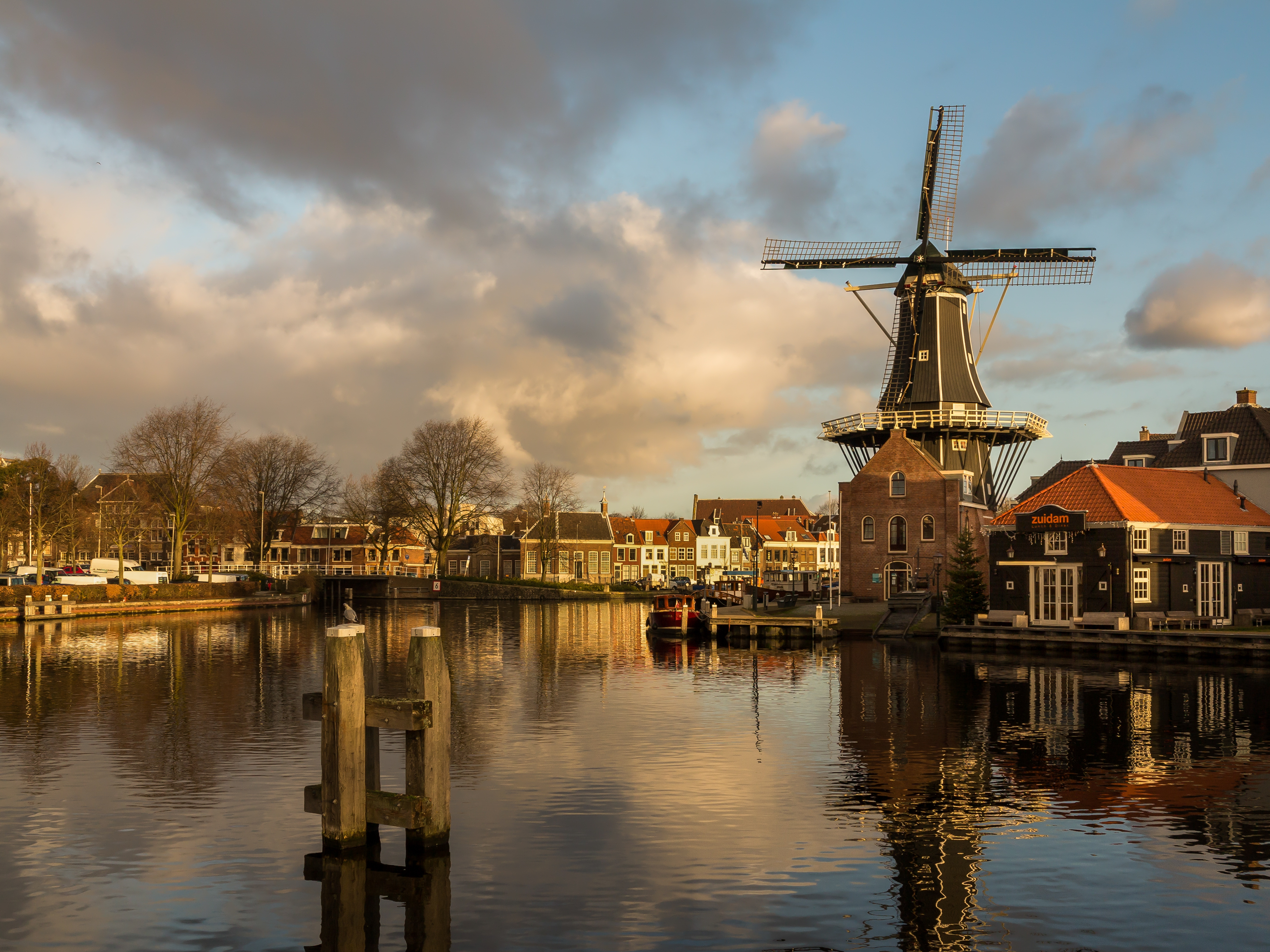
Haarlem, windmill: molen de Adriaan

The windmill was built on the foundations of the Goevrouwetoren by Adriaan de Booys, an industrial producer from Amsterdam. The Goevrouwetoren, or Goede Vrouwtoren (Goodwife Tower), had been the northern support of the city's Catrijnenpoort, a defence work over the River Spaarne. By the late 18th century, the gate was redundant due to the expansion of the city, and de Booys bought the tower and the land around it from the municipality of Haarlem on April 24, 1778. By reinforcing the foundations with wooden supporting poles, the mill was built to 34 metres above the level of the river, and above the surrounding city. De Adriaan was officially opened on May 19, 1779.

De Booys was granted permission to build a windmill to produce cement, paint, and tanbark. The windmill was built under the supervision of miller Henricus Ruijsch from Waddinxveen. De Booy earned the concession to be the sole producer of cement in the city for 25 years.

De Booys sold the windmill to Cornelis Kraan in 1802. The monopoly on cement had not been as lucrative as De Booys had hoped for; a competitor evaded the law by importing cement from Dordrecht. The windmill was sold for 1650 guilders, and Kraan converted the mill into a tobacco mill, to produce tobacco snuff. Kraan already owned a tobacco shop, at the Grote Houtstraat (number 12).

In 1865 a steam engine was placed in the windmill by the then owner, J. van Berloo, but this was not a commercial success. In 1925 the windmill was bought for 12,100 guilders by the Dutch windmill society Vereniging De Hollandsche Molen to prevent demolition.

The mill was severely damaged by a storm in 1930.

=== Fire ===
Burning Adriaan

On the evening of April 23, 1932 the windmill burnt down. The fire brigade arrived quickly but could not prevent the complete burning down of the mill. This event was a shock for many citizens of the city; the cause of the fire has never been established.

=== Rebuilding ===
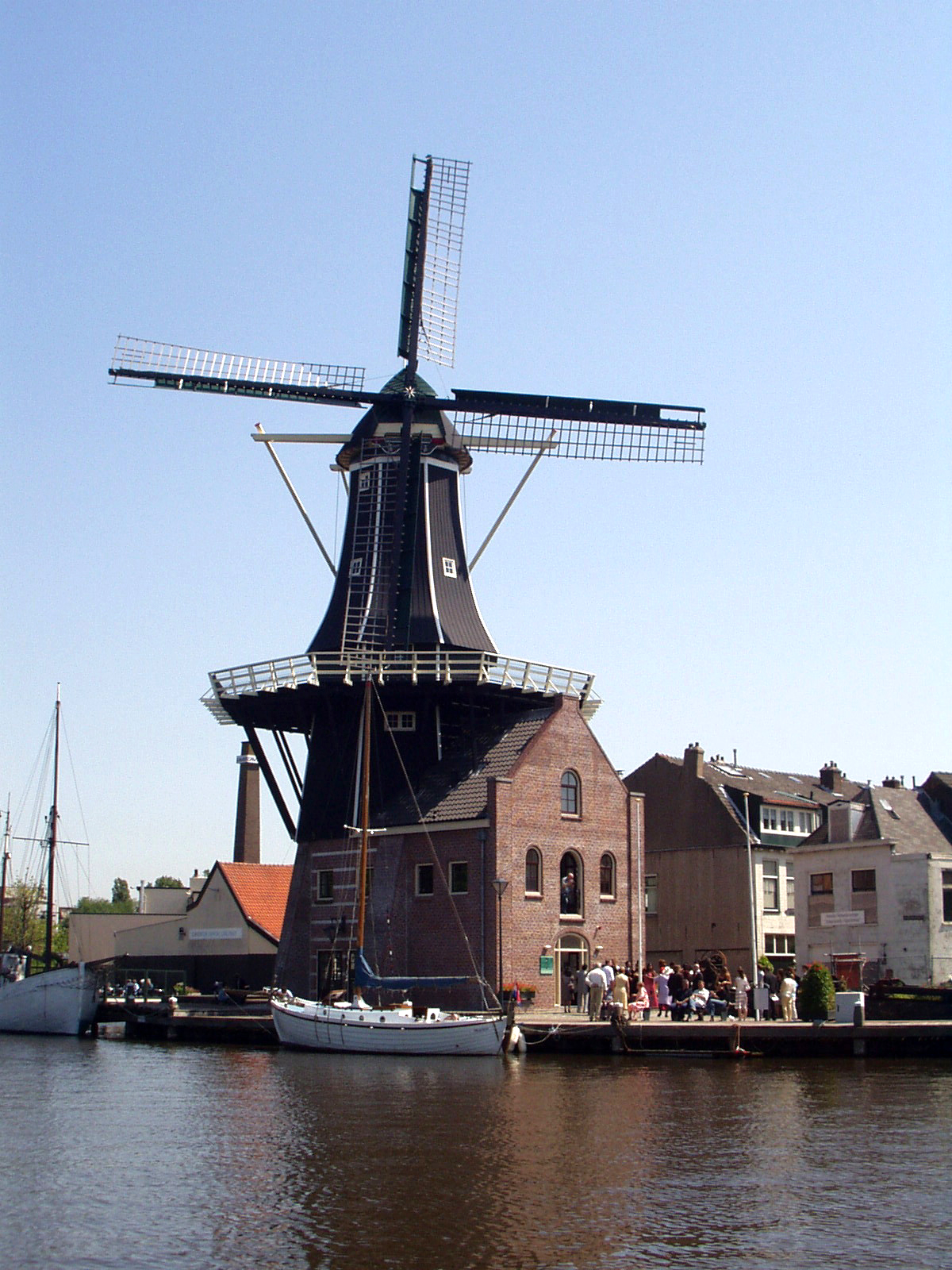
De Adriaan, used for a wedding

Immediately after the fire, citizens of Haarlem collected money to pay for the rebuilding of the mill. The owner of the mill, Vereniging De Hollande Molen, started a collection and the result was 3,000 guilders. The insurance money, 12.165 guilders, had to be used to pay off the mortgage on the mill.

The municipality of Haarlem made 10,000 guilders, a large amount of money, available in 1938 for the renovation of the mill, but this was overruled by the provincial council because of the bad economic situation. The renovation had to be postponed until the economic situation improved (1930s).

In 1963 the Haarlem municipality became owner of the mill and tried to restore it. That failed, however, due to a lack of funds.

In September 1985 a plan was presented by the architects Braaksma and Roos for renovation of the Scheepsmakersdijk; and their plan included a renovated windmill. In 1995 detailed plans were made by the Haarlem municipality and on April 21, 1999, the first pole was put in the ground.

De Adriaan was rebuilt on the original foundations of the old windmill. Windmill De Adriaan was reopened on April 23, 2002, exactly 70 years after the fire. The current owner is Stichting Molen De Adriaan.

== Tourist attraction ==
The windmill is fully functional, and is capable of grinding grain. However, it is not often in use - it works for tourists, mostly on Saturdays and holidays. Inside the windmill is a small museum, and the interior can be seen.
