= Spaarne =

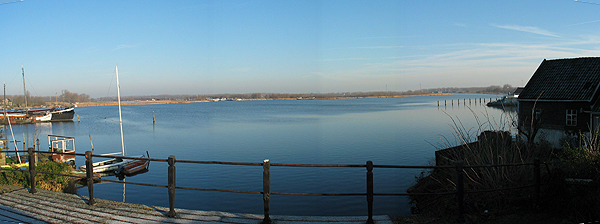
- Mouth of the Spaarne

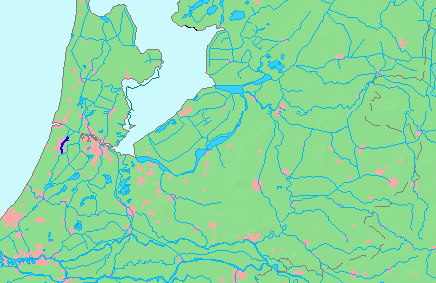
- Location of the Spaarne in dark blue

Location
- Country: Netherlands
- Province: North Holland

Physical characteristics
- Source: Ringvaart
  - location: Cruquius
  - coordinates: 52°20′20″N 4°38′23″E
- Mouth: North Sea Canal
  - location: Spaarndam
  - coordinates: 52°24′55″N 4°40′50″E
- Length: 10.5 km (6.5 mi)

Basin features
- Tributaries
  - right: Liede

The Spaarne is a river in North Holland, Netherlands. This partially canalized river connects the Ringvaart to a side branch of the North Sea Canal. It runs through Haarlem, Heemstede, and Spaarndam.

The historic canals of Haarlem's moats are connected to the Spaarne. A lock at Spaarndam separates it from the North Sea Canal.

According to Sterck-Proot, a historian, the name Spaarne probably comes from Spier, which means reed in old Dutch.

== History ==
The river formerly flowed from the Haarlemmermeer (Haarlem Lake) to the IJ, which used to extend from the Zuiderzee all the way to Velsen. In the 13th century, a dam with locks was constructed at the mouth of the Spaarne where the village of Spaarndam then formed.

After a century of planning, Haarlem's Lake was pumped dry in 3 years from 1850–1853 and made into a polder. The Spaarne became a branch of the Ringvaart, lost much of its flow, and became shallower.

The construction of the North Sea Canal (completed in 1876) reduced most of the IJ Bay into polders but a small canalized section of the IJ remained at Spaarndam to connect the Spaarne to the new canal.

The river was deepened for the benefit of industries along its shores.

== Places of interest along the riverbanks ==
At the juncture of the river and the ringvaart is the Cruquius Museum, a museum that resides in one of the three original pumping stations from 1850. Steam engines were used to pump the water out from the Haarlemmermeer polder. On the Heemstede side of the juncture is the old Castle Heemstede. Traveling up the river towards Haarlem, on the Heemstede side the dome of the Hageveld high school and former Catholic seminary can be seen. Continuing under the bridge to Schalkwijk, on that side is windmill "De Hommel", a sawmill that is often open to the public on spring and summer weekends. Across from that on the Heemstede side is rowing club K.R.Z.V. Het Spaarne and a few buildings by J.B. van Loghem, such as Tuinwijk, an early community living project sharing a garden. In the same block, entering Haarlem, is the old location of the ships architectural bureau De Voogt Naval Architects in the home of Henri de Voogt, known from Feadship. Nearing the next bridge, on the edge of the wood the Haarlemmerhout, villa Welgelegen can be seen, that once had a garden all the way to the Spaarne. Once in the center of Haarlem, many historic buildings in the centre of Haarlem, including:

- The Weigh House of Haarlem
- Hodson house
- Teylers Museum
- Teylers Hofje
- Windmill "De Adriaan"
- Hofje van Noblet
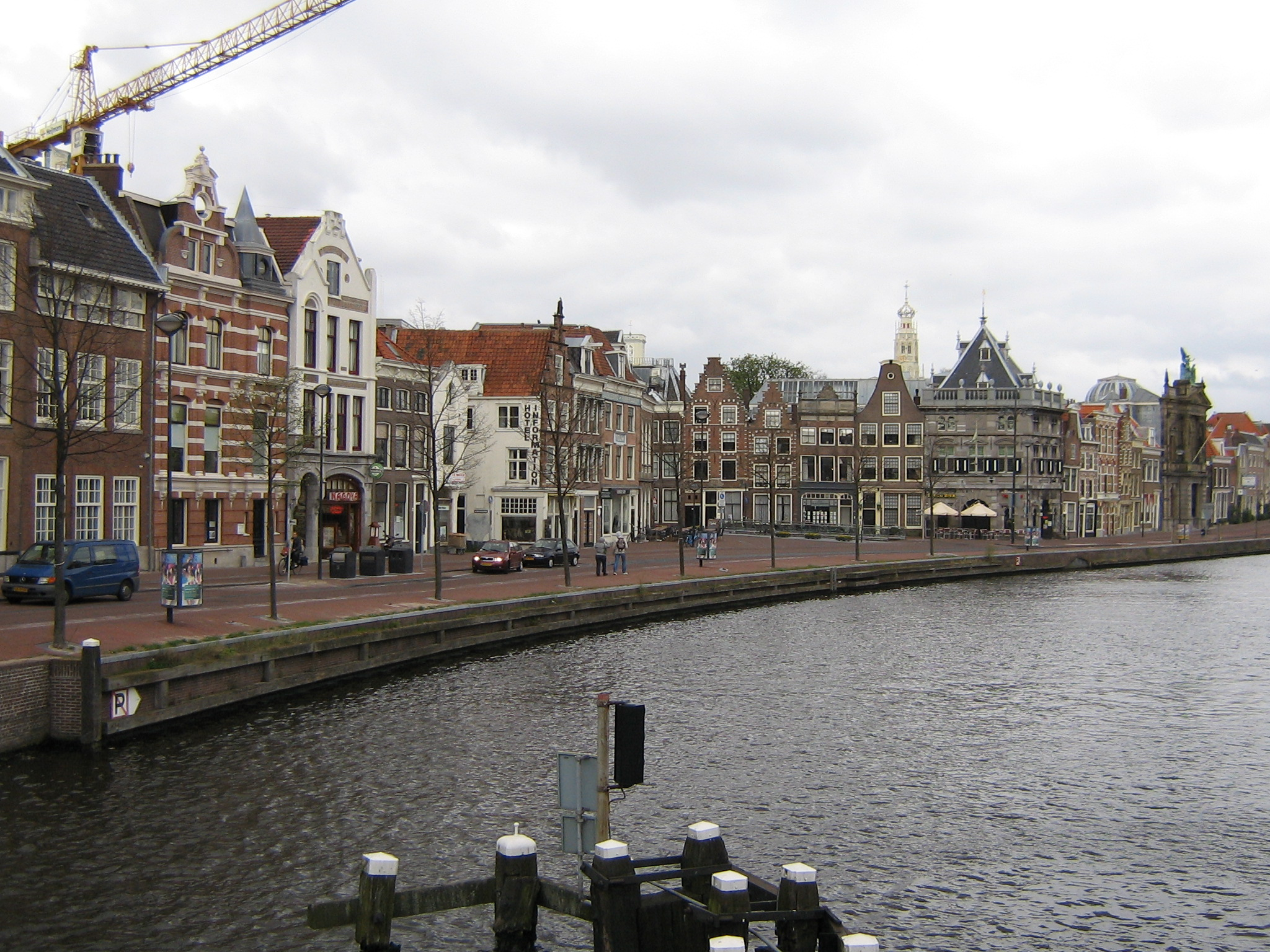
View of downtown Haarlem with the old weigh house in the middle

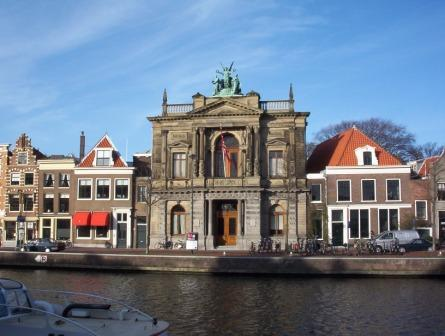
Teyler's Museum in Haarlem on the Spaarne

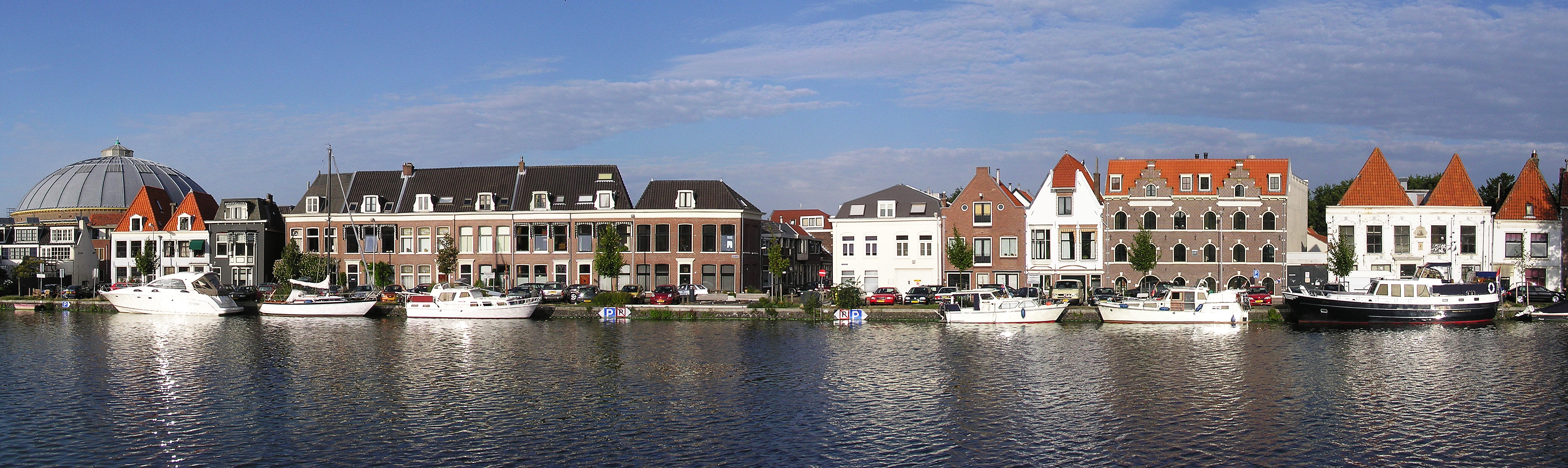
Houses along the Spaarne River

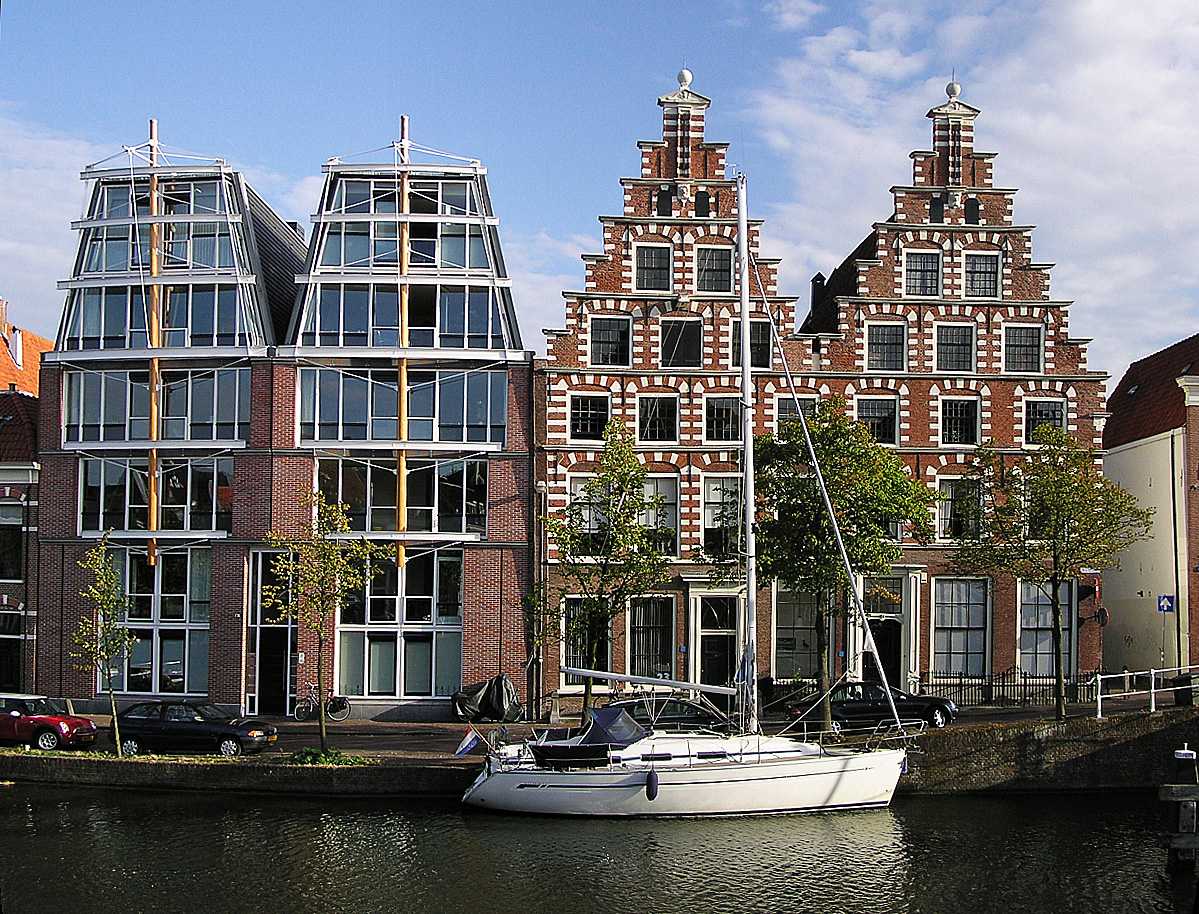
Modern and traditional houses along the Spaarne River
