= Johannes Bernardus van Loghem =

Dutch architect (1881–1940)

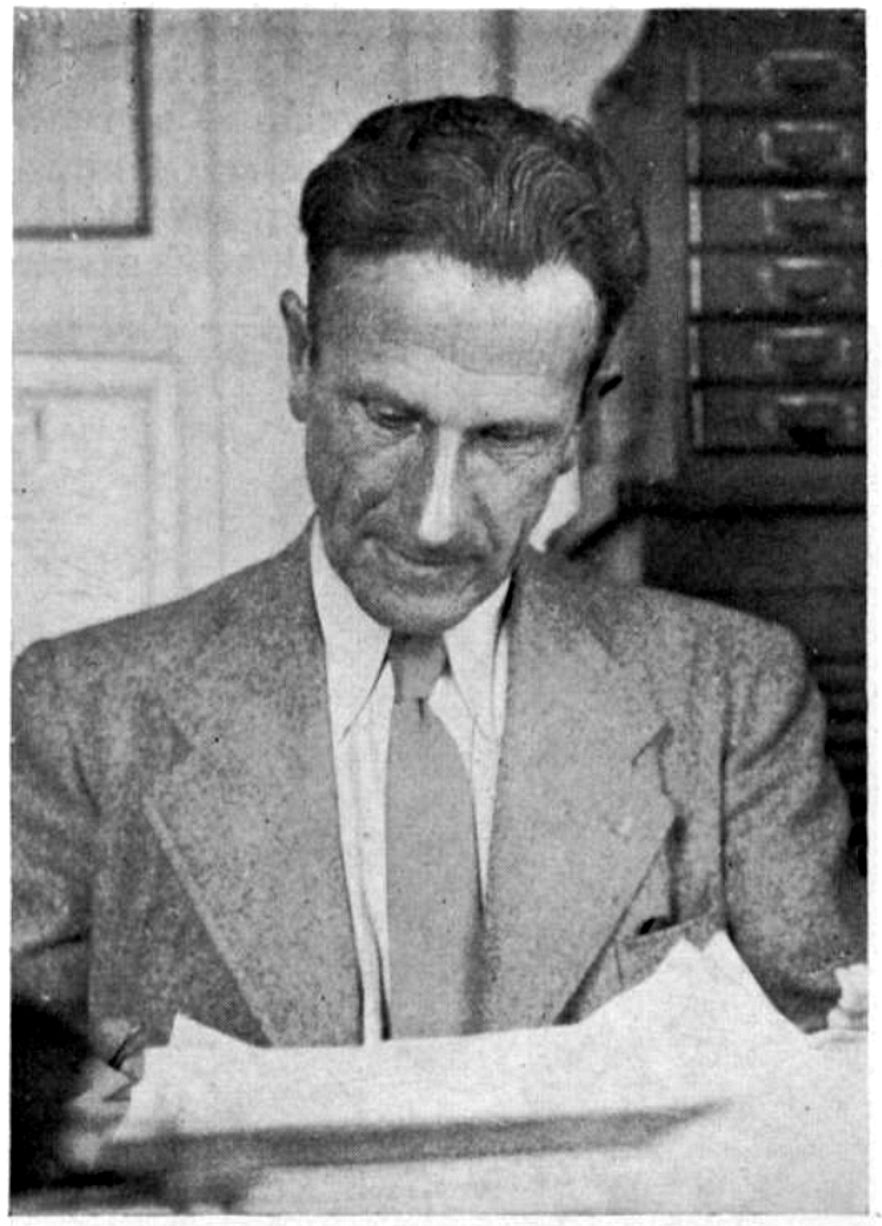
Han van Loghem

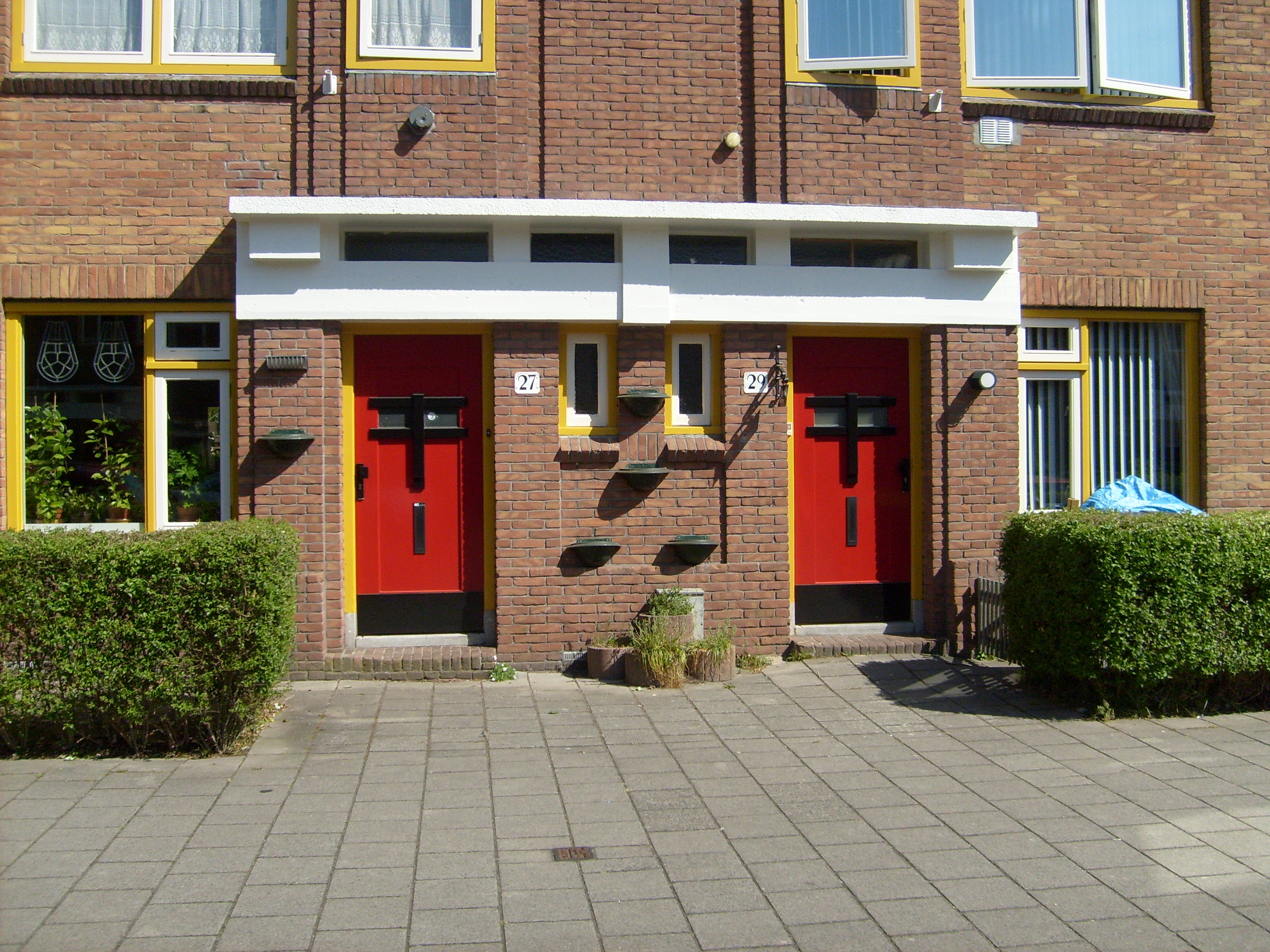
House on the Nijlstraat in Haarlem, front doors in a block of houses designed by Van Loghem

Johannes Bernardus (Han) van Loghem (1881–1940) was a Dutch architect, furniture designer and town planner.

== Biography ==
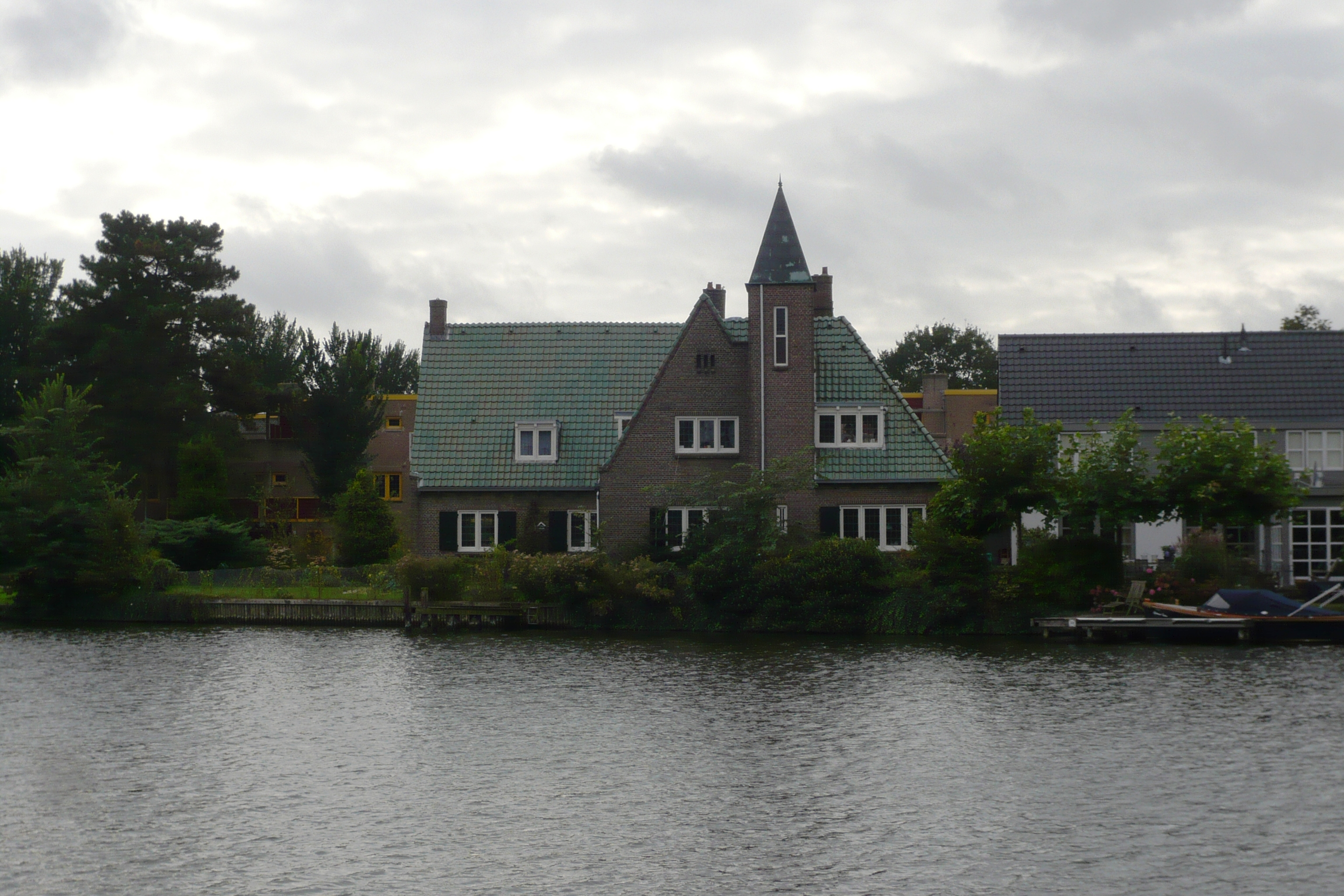
His house called "Steenhaag" on the Spaarne, with the facades of Tuinwijk Zuid behind it

He was born in Haarlem as the son of a bulb grower and after attending high school at the local HBS, he continued his education at the Polytechnical school there for civic engineering. According to the RKD he studied in Delft during the years 1905–1909 and was influenced by Frank Lloyd Wright and Hendrik Petrus Berlage. After graduation he became an architect in Haarlem where he married the textile artist Berta Neumeier. In 1912 they moved into the house of his own design on the Spaarne river called "Steenhaag".

He received many commissions for city planning, including the projects based on the garden city movement, Rosenhaghe (Haarlem), Betondorp (Amsterdam), Ter Cleef, and Tuinwijk-Zuid (Haarlem), which was built on the other side of the street from his own house. One of his patrons was the local electricity company, for whom he designed 80 aggregate transformer buildings.

From 1917 to 1919 he was a member of the board of directors of the league of Dutch architects and he taught technical theory at the HBO in Amsterdam from 1916–1925. In 1919 he was one of the founders (which included Berlage, Henriette Roland Holst, Clara Wichmann and the artist Theo van Doesburg) of the League of Revolutionary-Socialist Intellectuals. The league only lasted 3 years, possibly because its members were more artistically than politically engaged.

From 1926 to 1928, Van Loghem worked in Siberia on the urban development of an industrial area in central Siberia, with the mining town of Kemerovo as its center.

In 1928 he established his office in Rotterdam, and joined architecture association 'Opbouw', and would later write for its magazine De 8 & Opbouw. Van Loghem became an ardent advocate of New Objectivity, which he explained in his book Bouwen/Bauen/Bâtir/Building (Amsterdam: Kosmos, 1932), and exemplified through his designs for private houses, such as ''t Kôrnegoar' in Hengelo (1933), 'Knipscheer' in Waalre (1937) and 'Hartog' in Den Haag (1937).

He died in Haarlem on February 26 1940.
