= Jo Proot-Sterck =

Dutch historian (1868–1945)

Johanna Maria Proot-Sterck
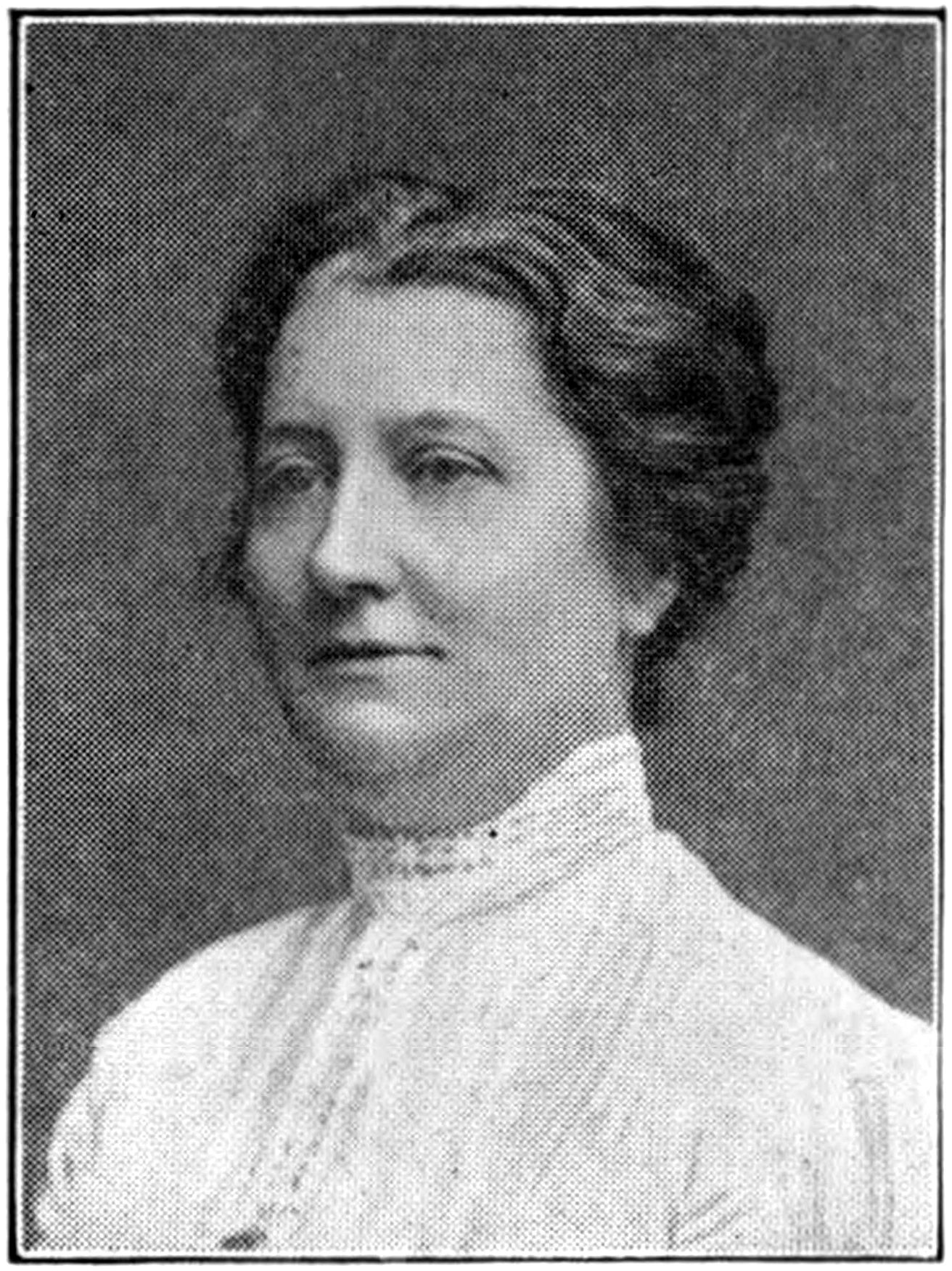
- Proot-Sterck (1913)
- Born: 25 July 1868; Leiden
- Died: 25 May 1945 (aged 76); Bentveld
- Burial place: Roman Catholic Adelbert Cemetery in Bloemendaal
- Other name: Jo Proot-Sterck
- Education: Leiden University,
- Occupations: Historian, writer
- Known for: Histories of Haarlem
- Children: 1

Johanna Maria Proot-Sterck (1868 – 1945) was a Dutch historian and teacher. She published articles and books on the history of Haarlem in North Holland, and the surrounding area.

== Biography ==
Jo Proot was born on 25 July 1868, in Leiden, the youngest of seven children. Her father was the wine merchant Adrianus Gabriel Proot, and her mother was Geertruida Antonia Petronella Peters. After finishing secondary school, she became a primary school teacher and soon earned the certificate required to be a head teacher. She taught at a boarding school in Great Britain for a few months before enrolling as a guest student at Leiden University in November 1891. There, she was able to attend lectures by the Dutch historians Robert Fruin and Pieter Lodewijk Muller. She also met Johanna Aleida Nijland, who would become a lifelong friend.

In 1892 and 1893, she attended courses on medieval history in Groningen and subsequently earned an advanced teaching certificate in history. With a recommendation from Fruin, she was awarded a temporary teaching position at the Groningen secondary school. Just two years later, she became a teacher of history and geography at the Gouden School, a prestigious five-year secondary school for girls in Amsterdam. Proot earned her diploma in geography shortly after taking that position. Afterwards, she joined Nijland as a teacher at another girls' school in Amsterdam.

=== Women's movement ===
In 1898, Proot and Nijland helped organize the National Exhibition of Women's Work in The Hague. It was there that she met the Dutch feminist and historian Johanna Naber, and beginning in 1905, Proot was a regular contributor to the "Journal of History." In the summer of 1905, Proot travelled to Lapland with her friend Ida Mollinger. At that time it was highly unusual for two women to travel alone but the trip was a success, and after their return, they gave 85 presentations, with slides, about the journey and their experiences in northern Finland.

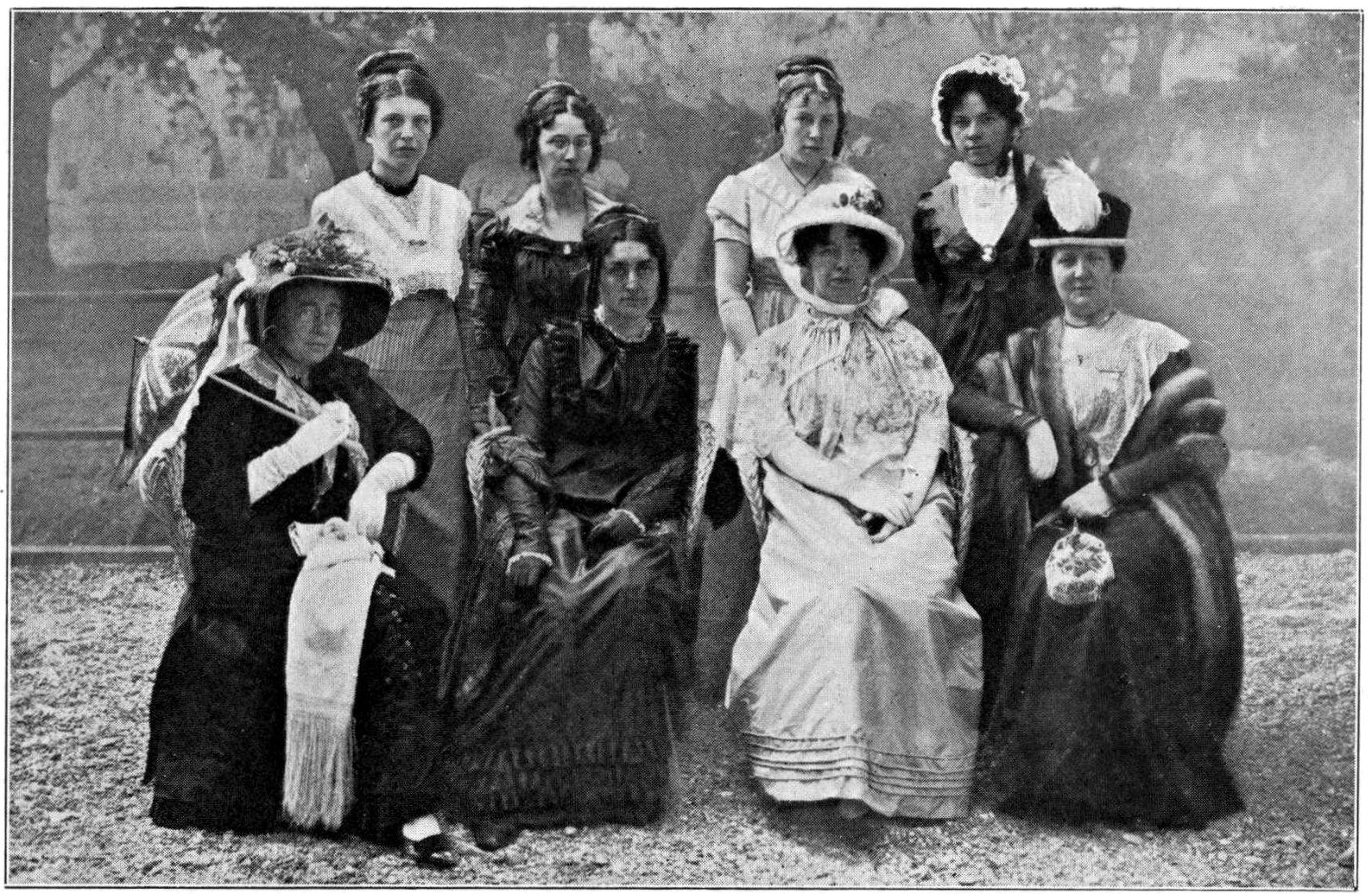
Organizing committee for De Vrouw 1813–1913 (Sterck-Proot seated first from the right)

On 26 November 1907, she married the literary scholar and widower Johannes Franciscus Maria Sterck (1859–1941) in Amsterdam. Sterck was a school inspector and an expert on the Dutch poet and writer Joost van den Vondel. Their daughter, Geertruida Juliana Johanna, was born in 1909, and a year later the family moved to Heemstede, a locale that Sterck-Proot wrote about extensively.

=== Historian ===
Together with Johanna Naber, Jo Sterck-Proot was a member of the historical committee for the women's exhibition called, De Vrouw 1813–1913. The event was a big success and was visited by some 300,000 women and men, including Dutch Queen Wilhelmina, twice.

Despite her affiliation with the women's movement, Sterck-Proot published the pamphlet "What Speaks Against the Women's Suffrage Movement" in 1916. In it, she promoted a family model in which the man was the head of the household and the woman merely a mother and housewife. However, this philosophy did not appear to apply to her own life as Sterck-Proot was actively working as a writer. She wrote on familiar topics such as the genealogies of the Proot and Sterck families, as well as articles and books about Haarlem.

Sterck-Proot was a member of the board of the Haarlem Historical Society, as well as the Haarlem branch of the Housewives' Union. She was a member of the Society for Dutch Literature (since 1906) and the Royal Geographical Society. She spoke about historical and literary topics for the radio station KRO. In 1931, she distanced herself from her 1916 anti-feminist pamphlet with a text called "A Historical Mirror of Women," a historical overview of women's achievement from many eras. It was well received and was even performed on 28 February 1931, at the Stedelijk Museum Amsterdam to raise funds for the International Alliance for Women's Suffrage and Equal Rights.

When Sterck-Proot's husband died on 28 August 1941, she moved to a smaller home in Aerdenhout, about which she had written a history in 1939. There she organized afternoon social gatherings to discuss Vondel and Dante. In late May 1944, during World War II, Nazi forces occupied Holland tightened their grip, causing mass starvation. Sterck-Proot was evacuated to the village of Bentveld where she died on 25 May 1945; she was buried next to her husband in the Roman Catholic Adelbert Cemetery in Bloemendaal.

Her papers and materials are preserved at the North Holland Archives.

== Selected works ==
- Sterck-Proot, Joanna Maria. The Saint Agnes Convent in Amsterdam. 1909.
- Sterck-Proot, JM "Nutcracker." De Levende Natuur 18, no. 18 (1914): 432-432.
- Sterck-Proot, JM "The Kuifmees in the Dune District." The Living Nature 20, no. 23 (1916): 459-459.
- Sterck-Proot, Johanna Maria. What argues against the women's suffrage movement. De Spaarnestad, 1916.
- Sterck-Proot, JM "New additions to the Haarlem courtyards." Yearbook of the Haarlem Association, Haarlem (1937).
- Sterck-Proot, JM, "History of Aerdenhout" (1939)
