= Bentveld =

- Village
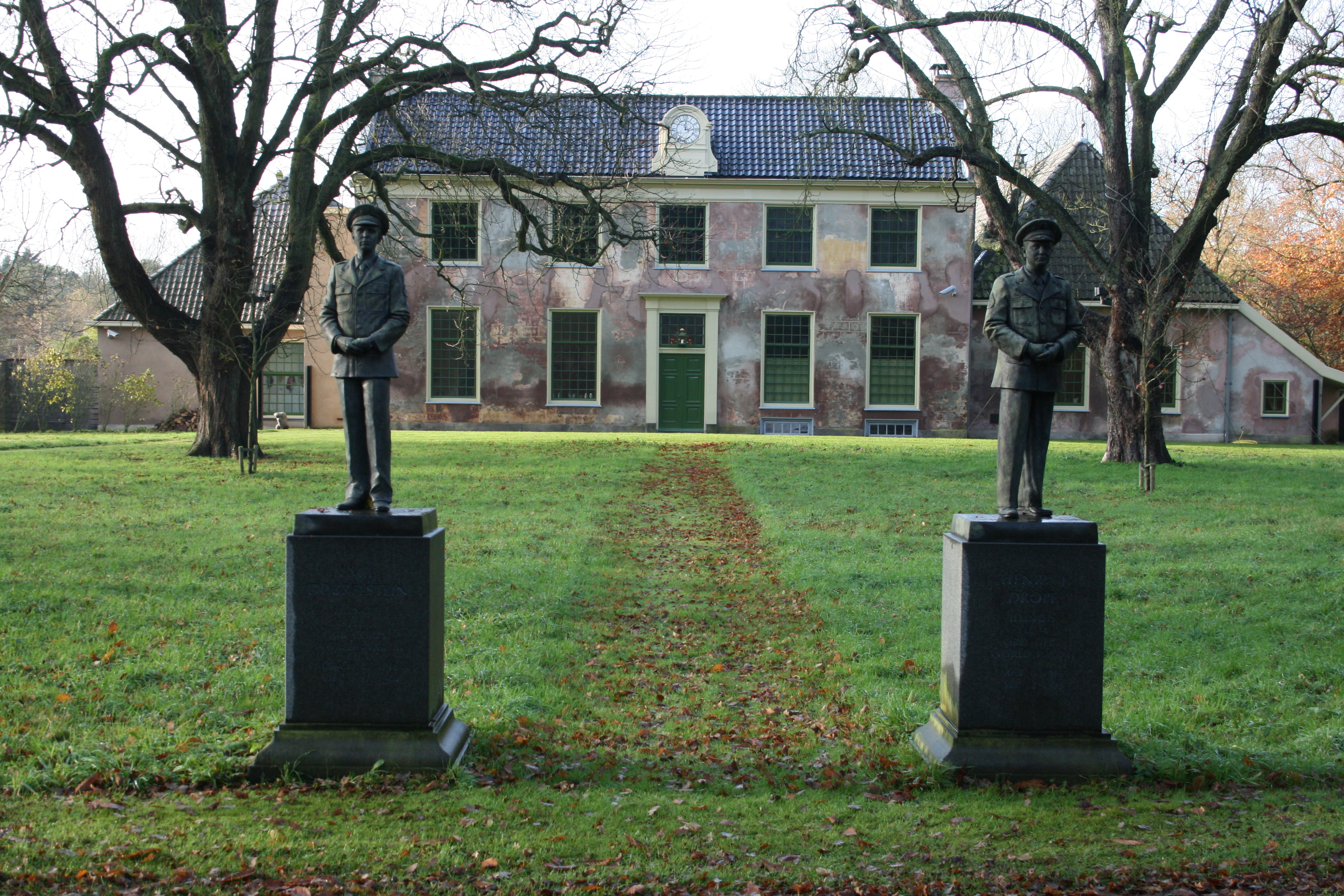
- Estate Groot Bentveld

- Location in the Netherlands Location in the province of North Holland in the Netherlands
- Coordinates: 52°21′57″N 4°34′18″E
- Country: Netherlands
- Province: North Holland
- Municipality: Zandvoort; Bloemendaal

Area
  - Total: 0.78 km^{2} (0.30 sq mi)
- Elevation: 8 m (26 ft)

Population (2021)
  - Total: 1,025
  - Density: 1,300/km^{2} (3,400/sq mi)
- Time zone: UTC+1 (CET)
  - Summer (DST): UTC+2 (CEST)
- Postal code: 2116
- Dialing code: 023

Bentveld is a village in the Dutch province of North Holland. It is a part of the municipality of Zandvoort, and lies about 5 kilometres (3 mi) west of Haarlem. Part of the village is located in the municipality of Bloemendaal, however it can be considered annexed since 1978.

The village was first mentioned in 1615 as Bent Velt, and means "field of moor grass (Molinia). Bentveld started to developed after the tram line Zandvoort to Haarlem was constructed in 1899. The tram operated until 1957.
