= Waag, Haarlem =

Waag
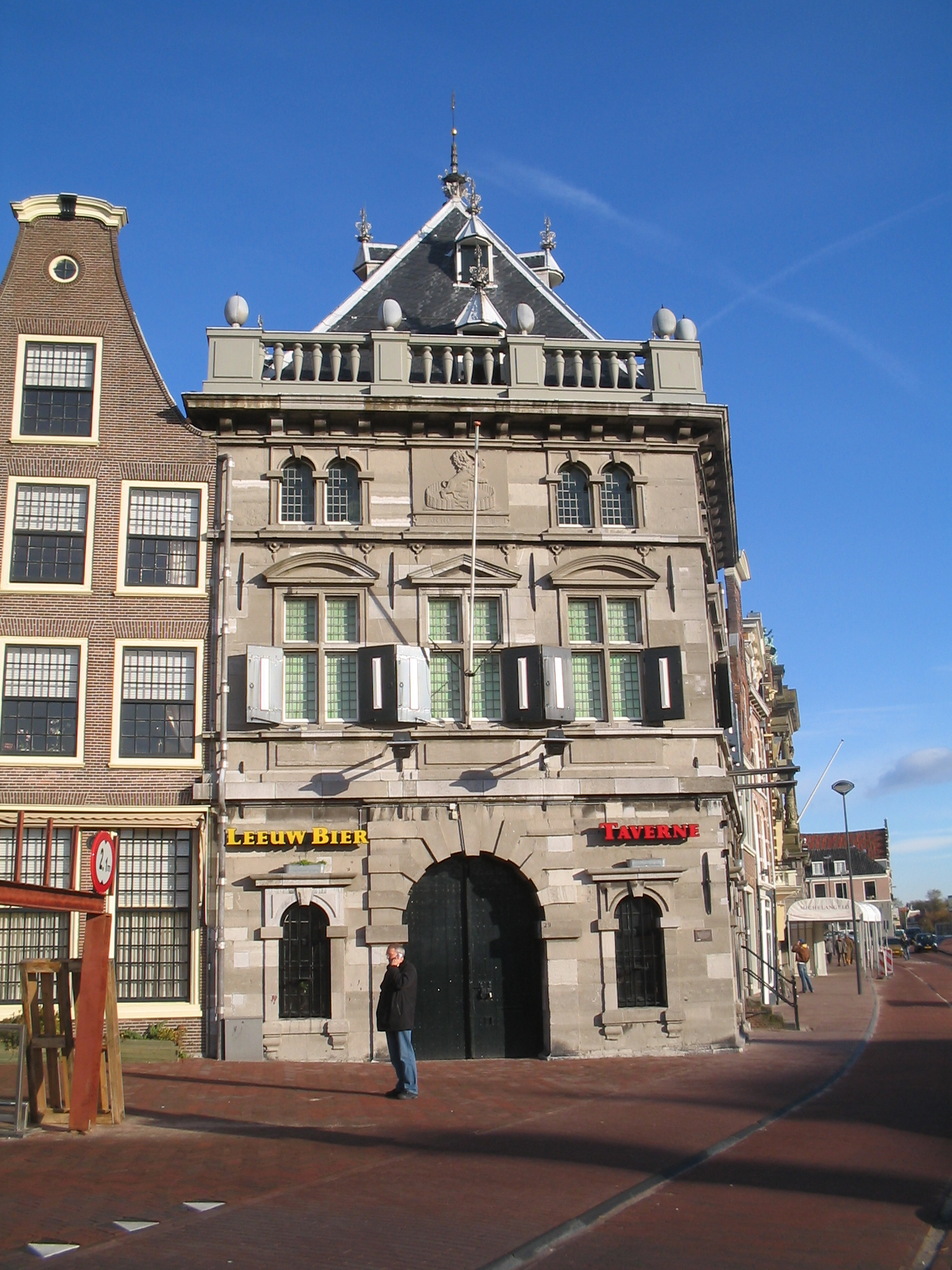
- Waag, looking north along the houses facing the Spaarne river
- Interactive map of the Waag area

General information
- Type: Weigh house
- Architectural style: Renaissance
- Location: Haarlem, Damstraat 29
- Coordinates: 52°22′49″N 4°38′24″E
- Completed: 1908

Design and construction
- Architect: Lieven de Key

The Waag (Waegh) is a former Weigh house in Haarlem that today serves as a café catering to tourists.

== History ==
The building was designed by Lieven de Key around 1597 and is built with Namense steen from Namur, Belgium. It is the only building in Haarlem that was built this way, and was designed in its day as a landmark that befits an authority. The weigh house masters needed to be able to judge the correct measure of a shipload of grain that was delivered in Haarlem. Inside the large cast iron balance can still be seen. The location of the weigh house was strategically located where the Spaarne river joins the beek, a small canal that according to tradition was used to carry fresh water from the dunes to serve the brewers of Haarlem. Haarlem was known for its beer brewing in the 15th-17th centuries. A large wooden crane operated by wheels driven by manpower was used to hoist the grain on ships into the Waag building and back into other ships or carts for further transport. The wooden crane can be seen on most historic pictures of the Spaarne up until 1872.

In 1821 the top floor of the Waag was rented to the artist club Kunst zij ons doel for drawing classes gathered around a live model. The room is still used for this function, though fewer drawing classes are held nowadays and the rooms are often used for exhibitions. The entrance to the artist club is via the small staircase on the Spaarne side.

== Gallery ==
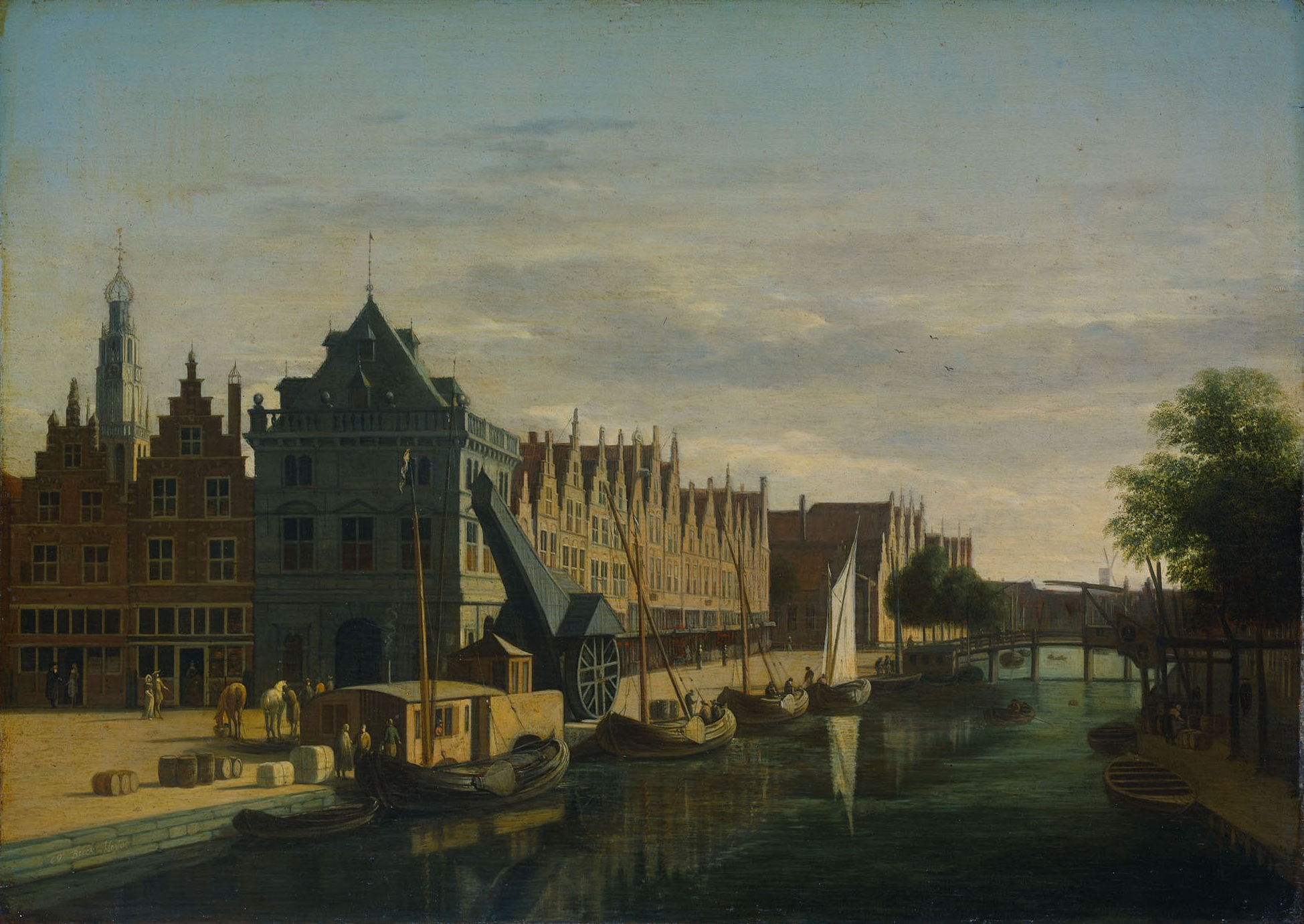
De Waag and Crane on the Spaarne, Haarlem, looking north, by Gerrit Adriaensz Berckheyde

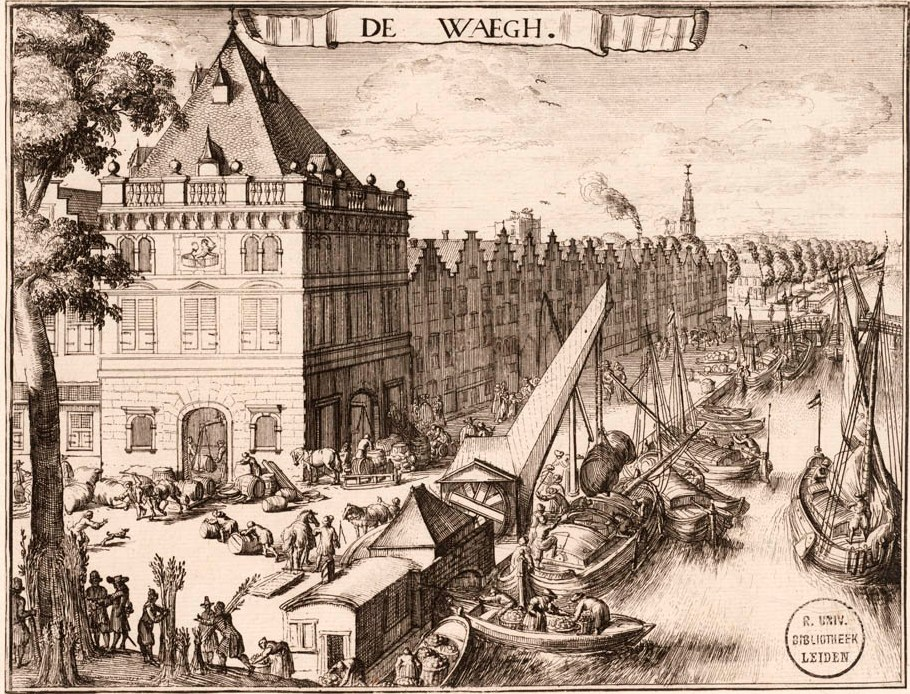
De Waegh, looking north, by Romeyn de Hooghe, 1690

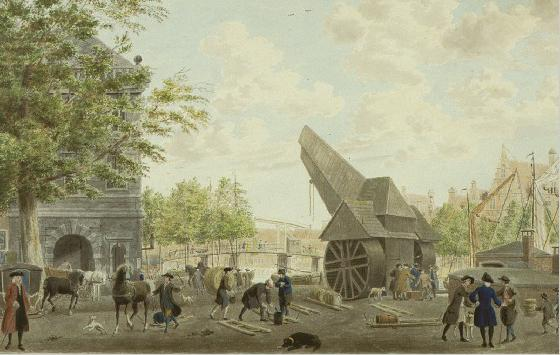
Slepershoofd; Wooden crane, looking northeast, by Cornelis van Noorde, 1767

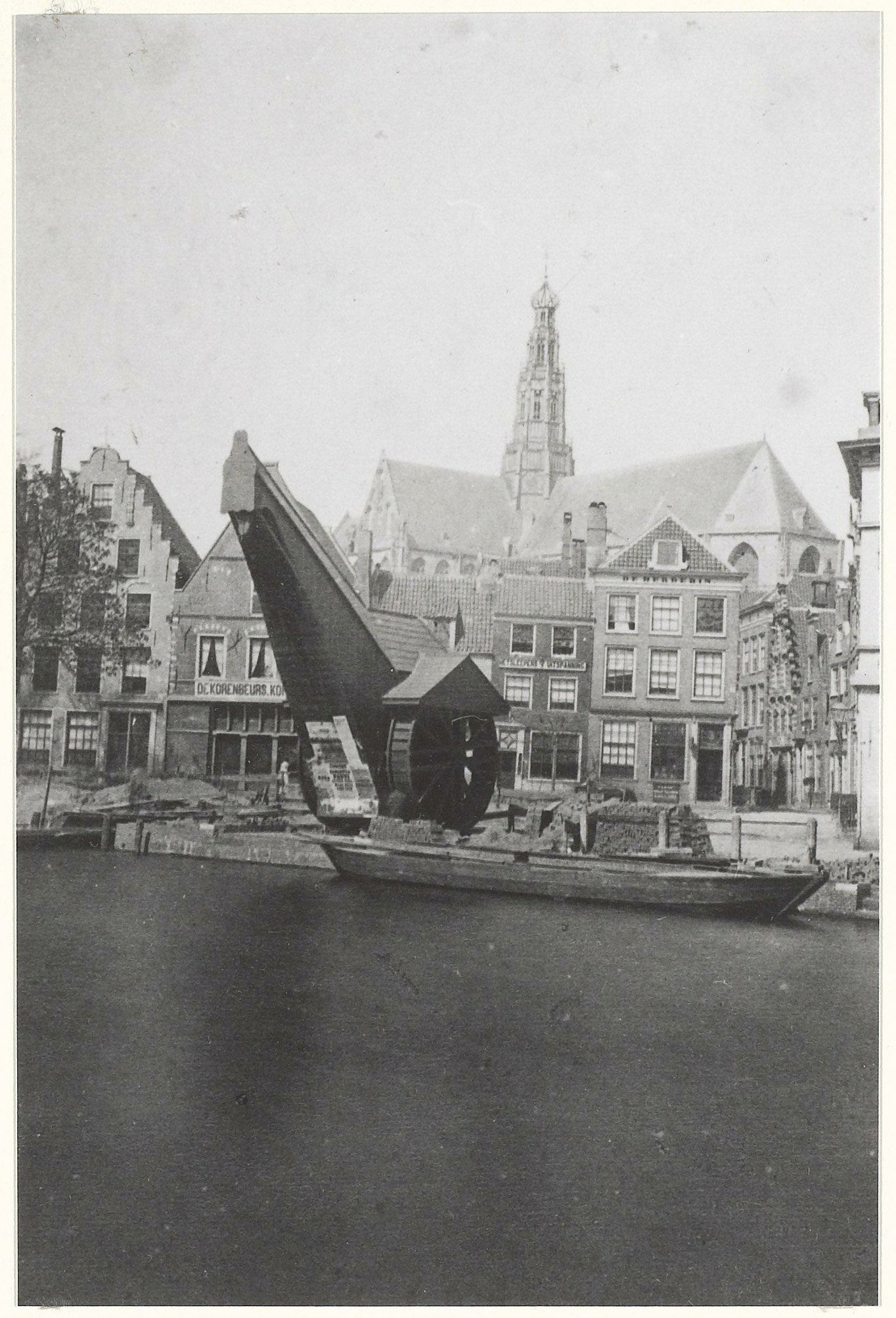
Wooden crane, looking westwards towards the Grote Kerk, Haarlem, shown with the corner of the Waag on the far right, by Adolphe Braun, 1865
