= List of people from Groningen =

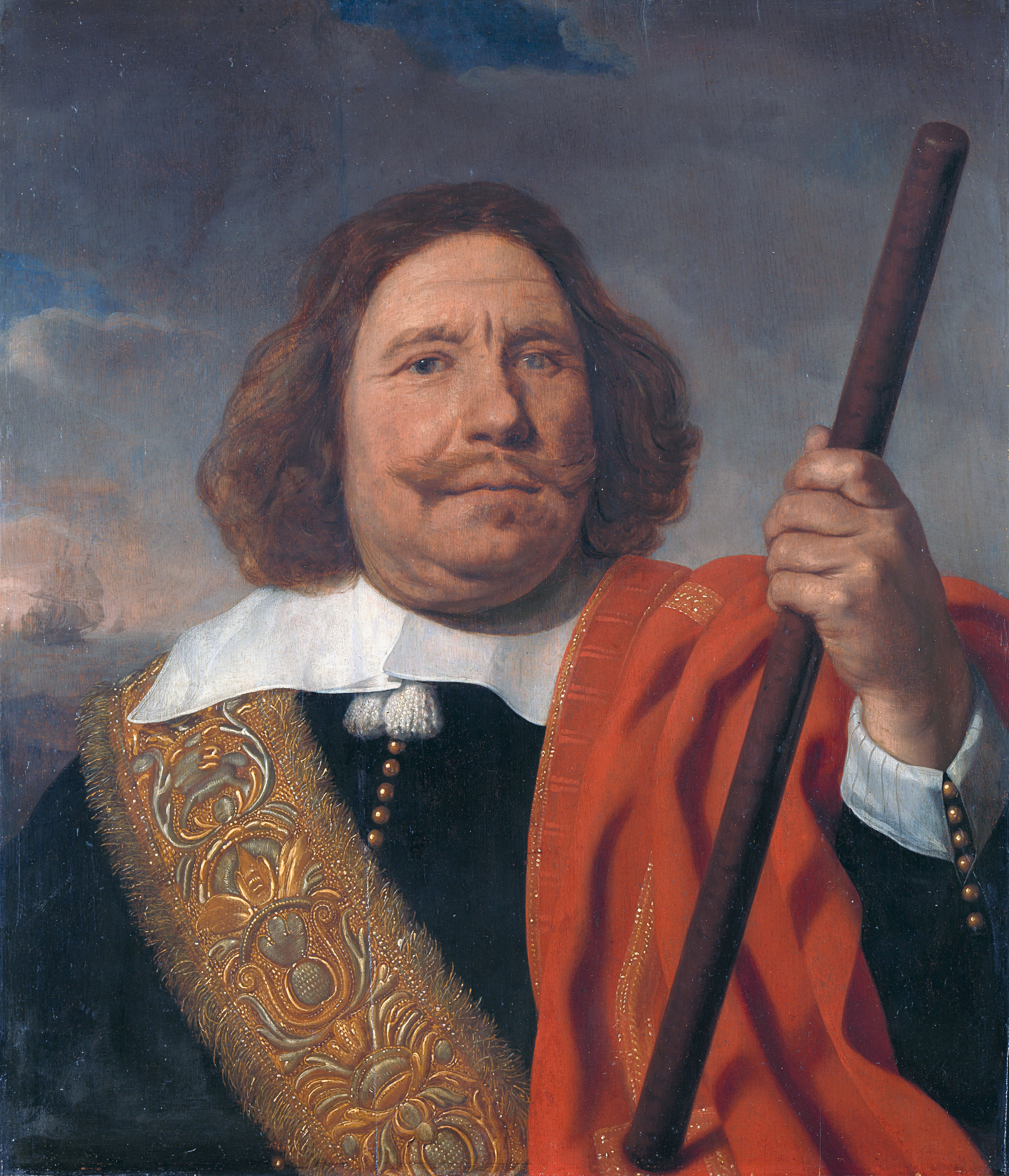
Egbert Kortenaer

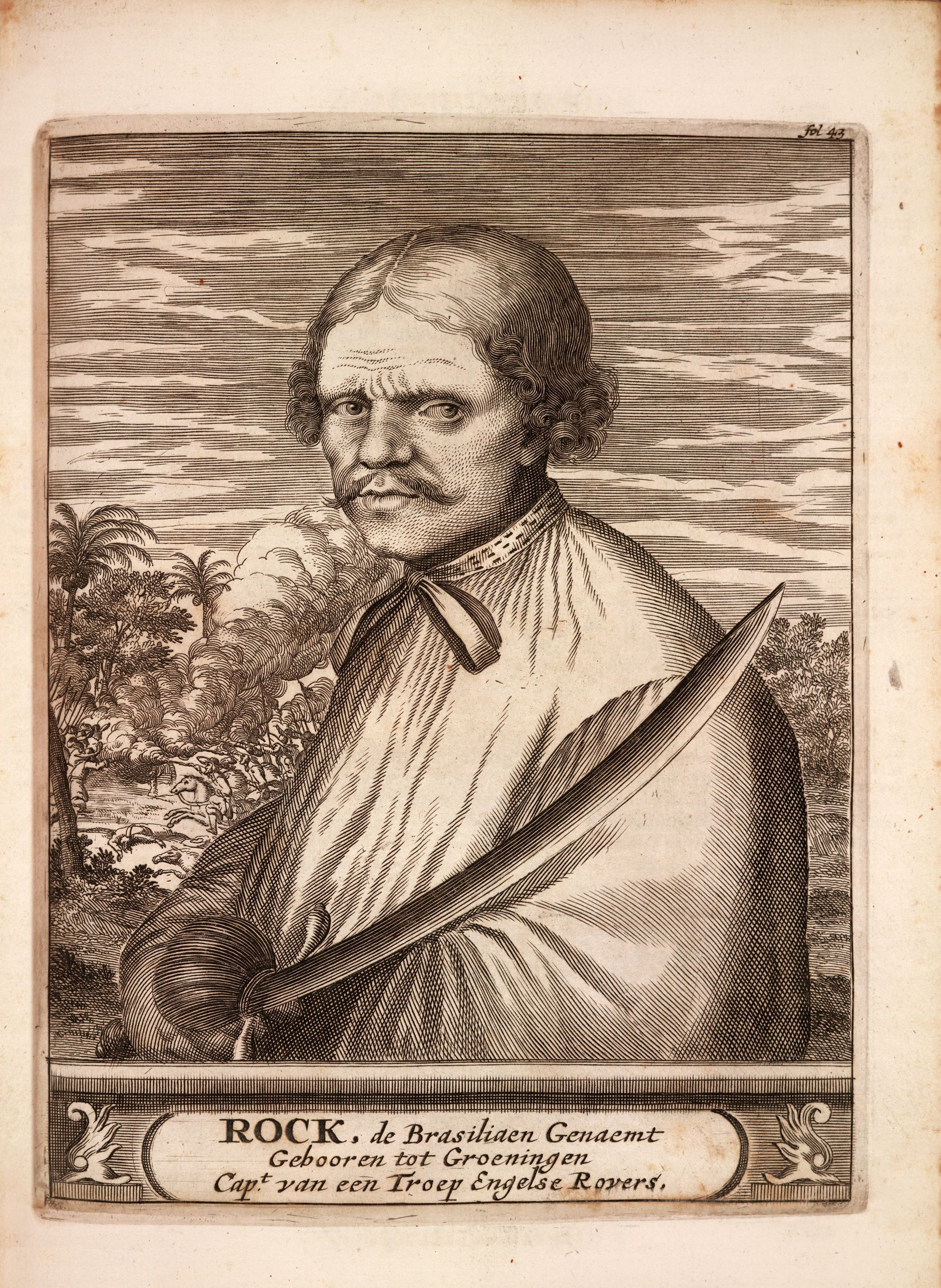
Roche Braziliano

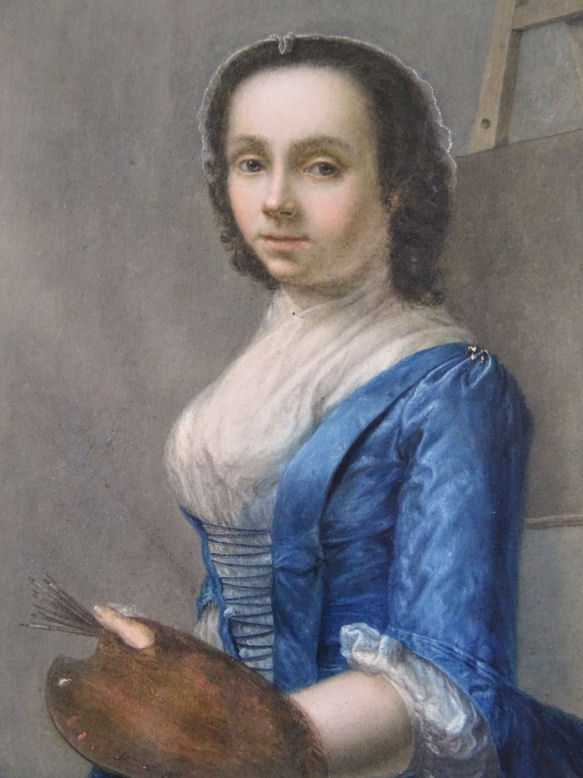
Elisabeth Wassenbergh

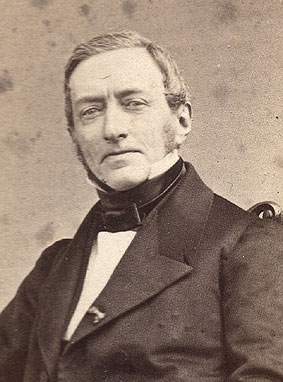
Schelto van Heemstra

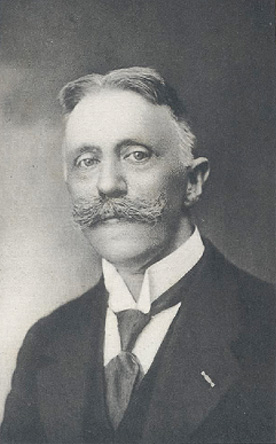
Dirk Jan de Geer

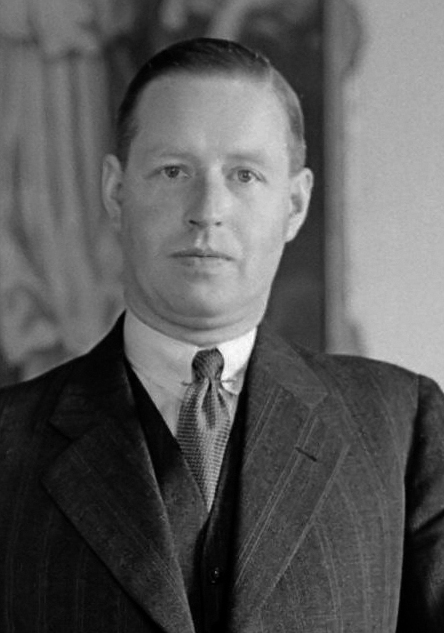
Alidius Tjarda van Starkenborgh Stachouwer

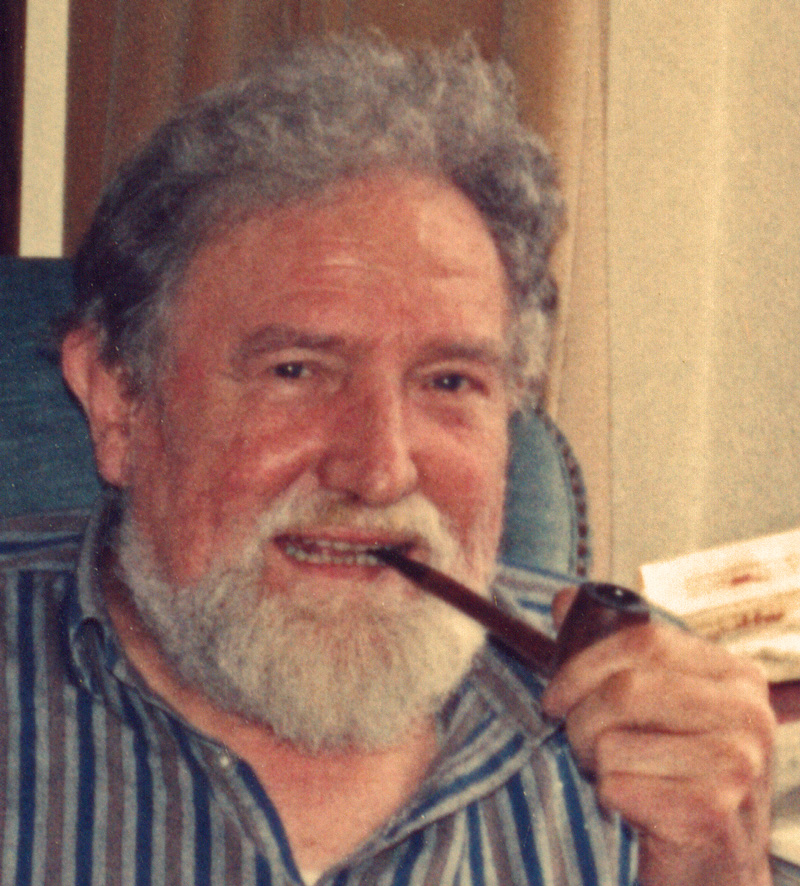
Poppe Damave

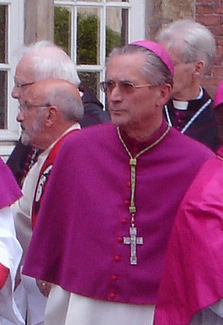
Ad van Luyn

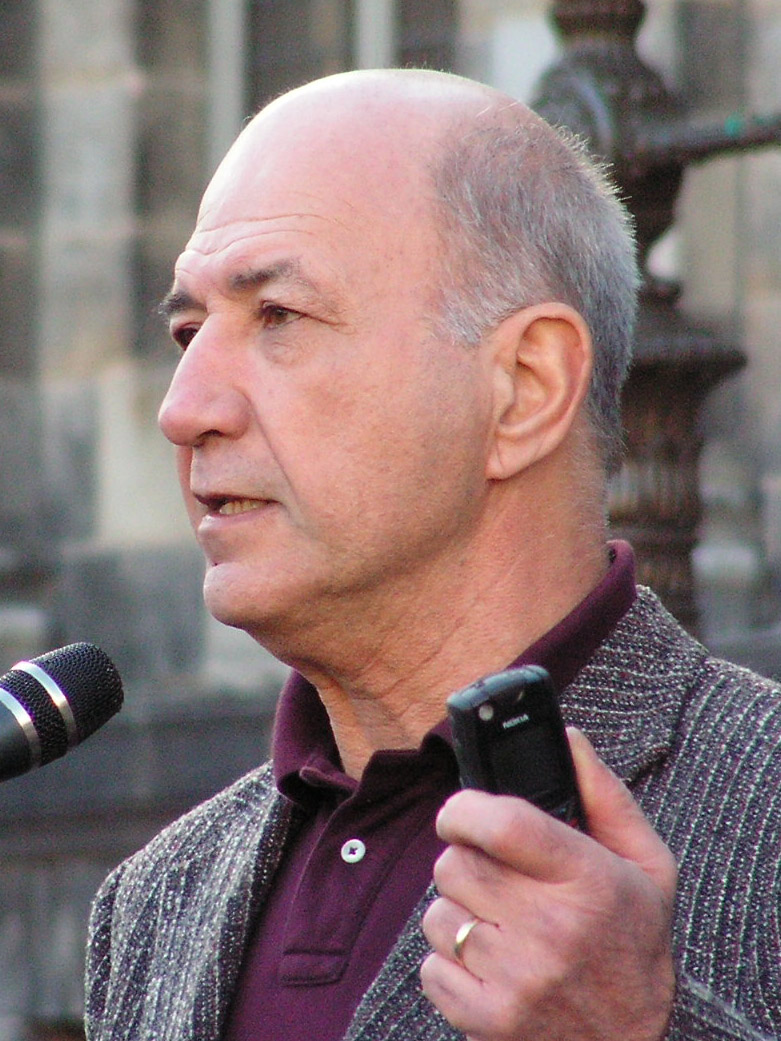
Wubbo Ockels

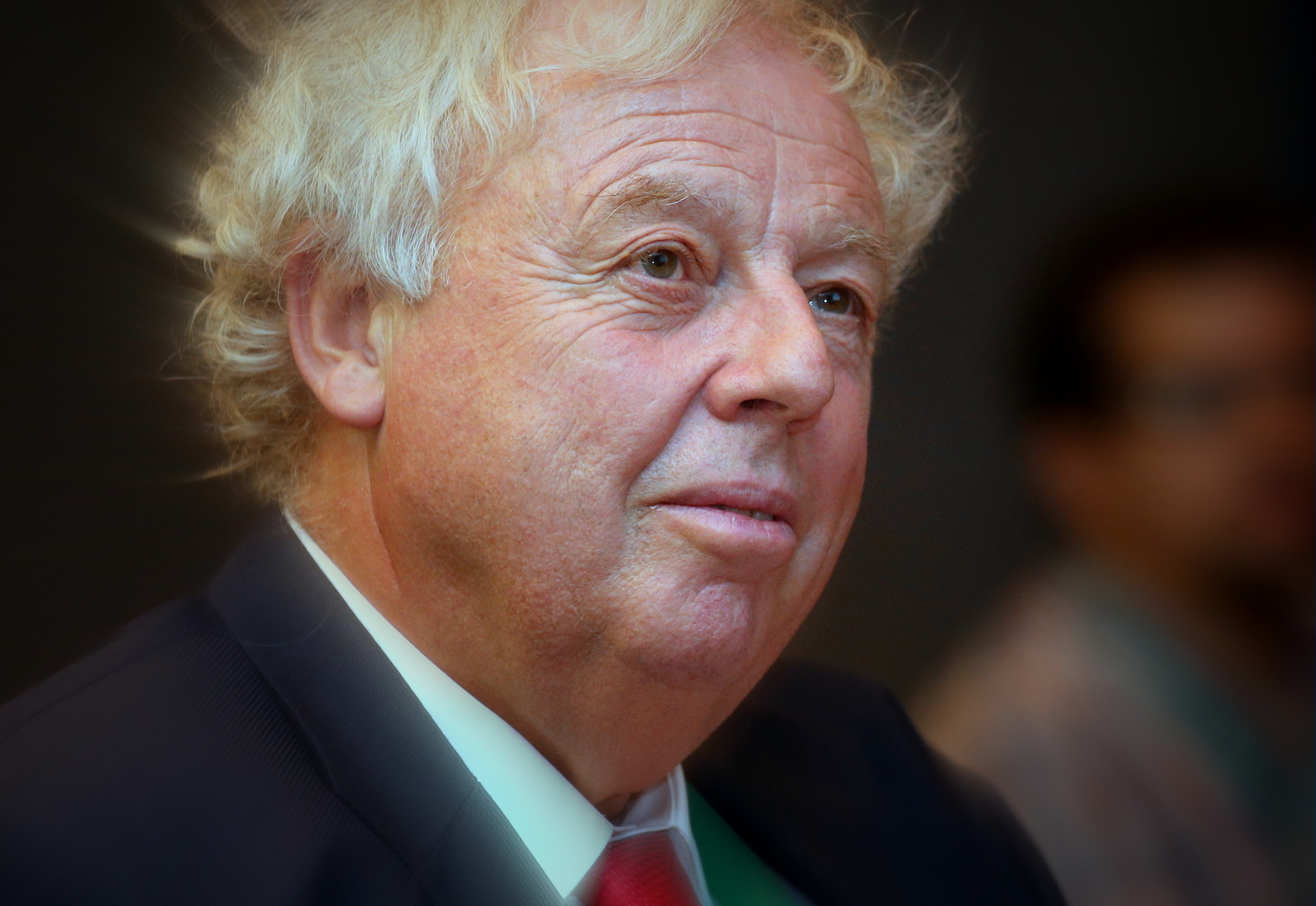
Sierd Cloetingh

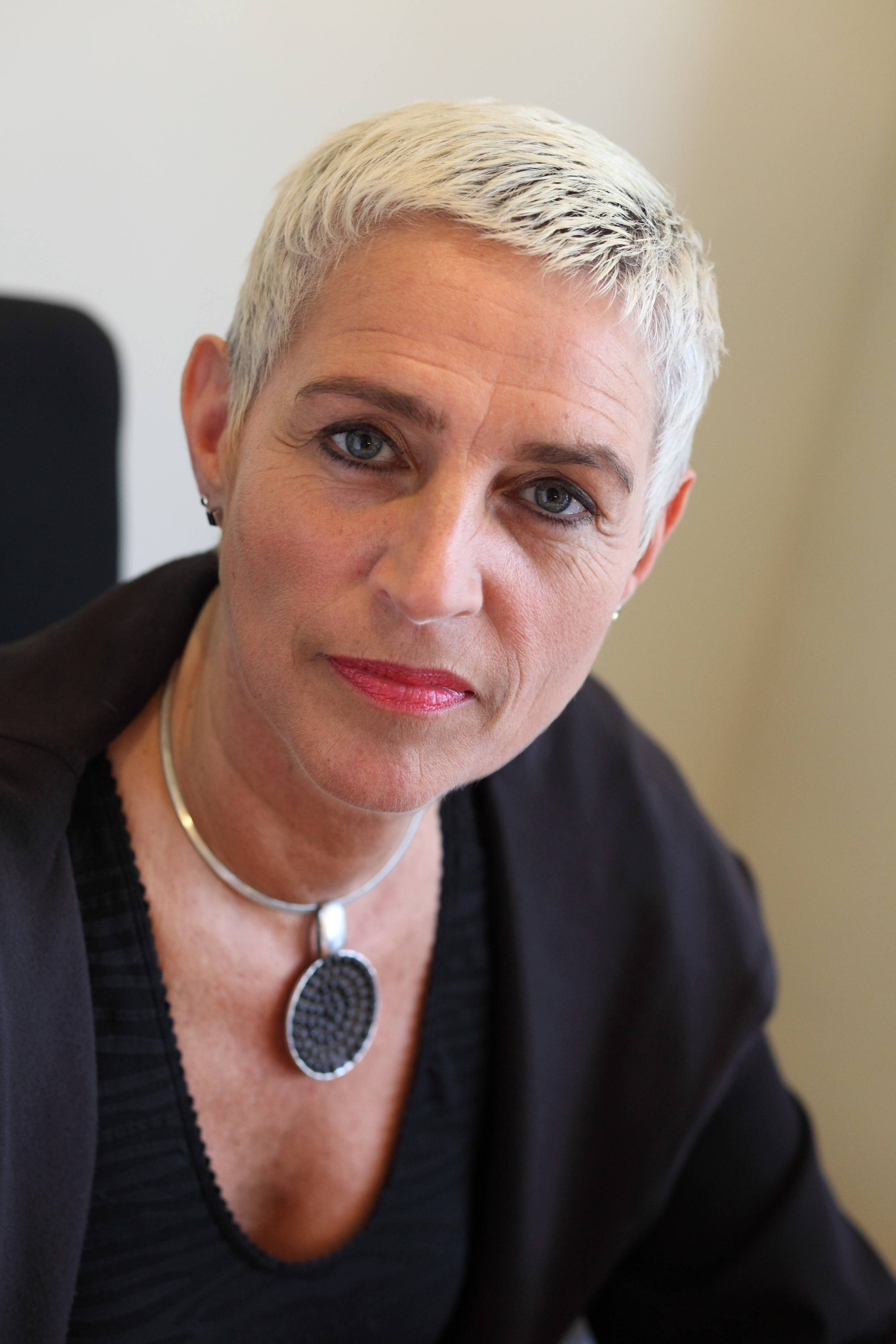
Wilma Mansveld

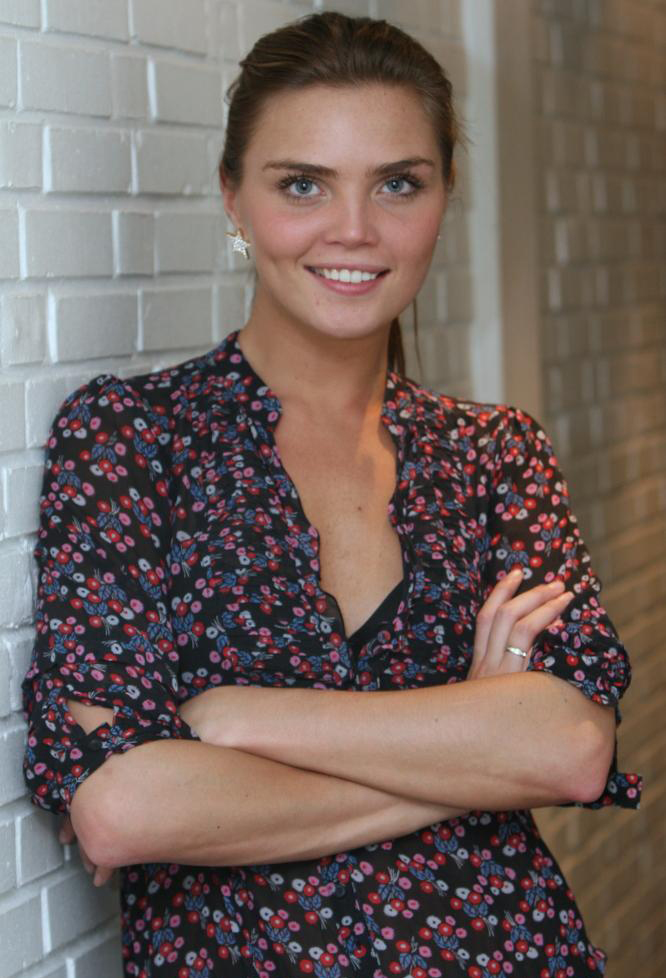
Kim Feenstra

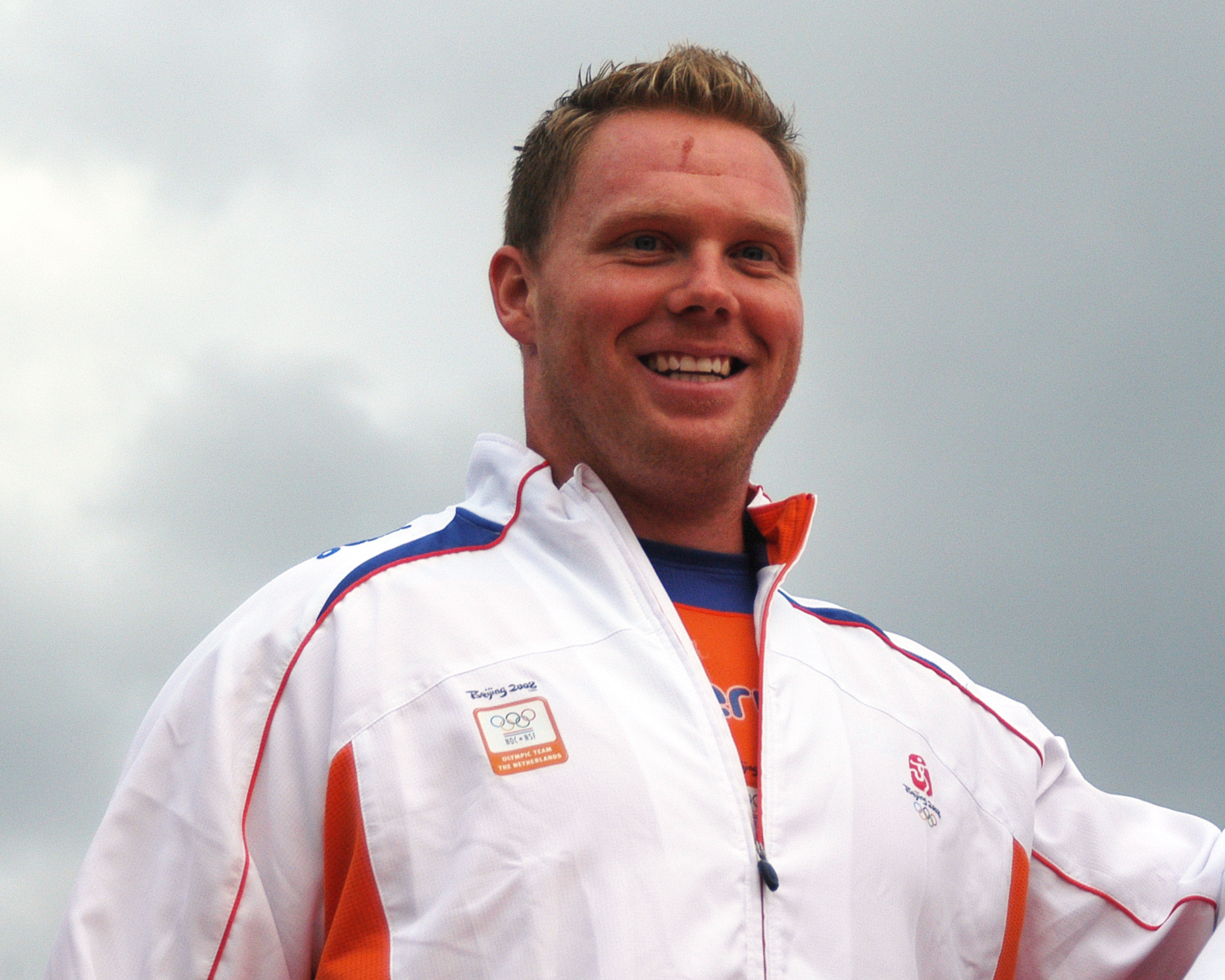
Rutger Smith

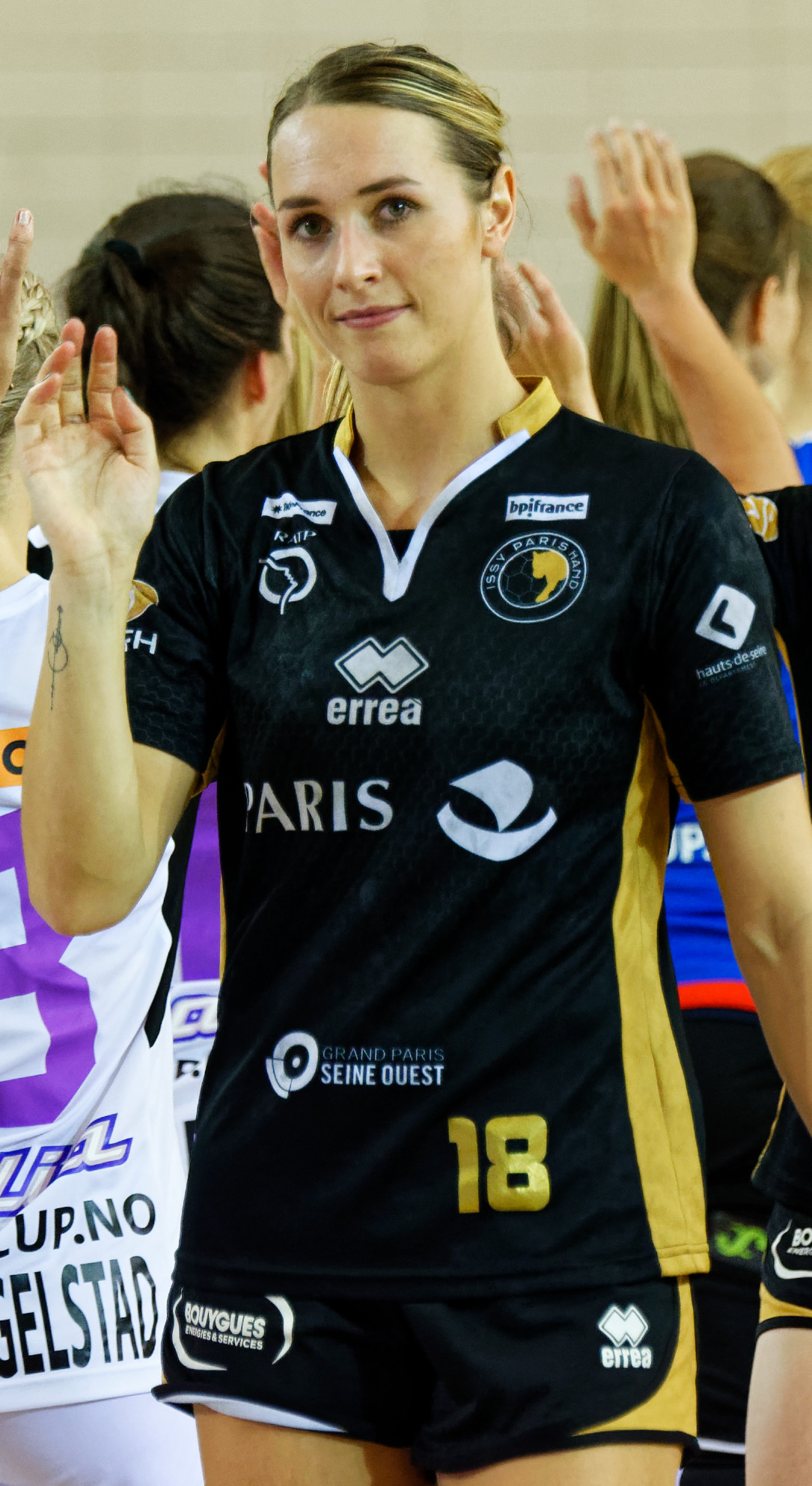
Lois Abbingh

This is a chronological list of notable people from Groningen, who were either born and raised there, were long-term residents, or otherwise have a strong association with the area.

== Before 1750 ==
- Wessel Gansfort (1419–1489), theologian and early humanist
- Volcher Coiter (1534–1576), anatomist, founder of comparative osteology and first to identify cerebrospinal meningitis
- Christiaan Coevershoff (1595–1659), Dutch Golden Age painter
- Egbert Bartholomeusz Kortenaer (1604–1665), admiral
- Adriaan Geerts Wildervanck (1605–1661), businessman and coloniser
- Albert Eckhout (c.1610–1665), portrait and still life painter
- Roche Braziliano (c.1630–c.1671), pirate
- Joris Andringa (1635–1676), naval officer
- Tiberius Hemsterhuis (1685–1766), philologist and critic
- Albert Schultens (1686–1750), philologist
- Daniel Bernoulli (1700–1782), mathematician and physicist
- Johannes Antiquus (1702–1750), painter
- Albertus Antonius Hinsz (1704–1785), organ-builder
- Bernard II van Risamburgh (c.1710—c.1767), cabinetmaker
- Willem Arnold Alting (1724–1800), Governor-General of the Dutch East Indies from 1780 until 1797
- Elisabeth Wassenbergh (1729–1781), painter
- Etta Palm d'Aelders (1743–1799), early feminist and spy
- Leopold von Goeckingk (1748–1828), German lyric poet, journalist and Prussian official.
- Johann August Just (c.1750–c.1791), pianist, violinist, and composer
- Abel Janszoon Tasman (1603–1659), explorer, seafarer, merchant for the Dutch East India Company

== 1750–1870 ==
- John Goodricke (1764–1786), astronomer, observed the variable star Algol
- Albert Dominicus Trip van Zoudtlandt (1776—1835), lieutenant-general at the Battle of Waterloo
- Petrus Hofman Peerlkamp (1786–1865), classical scholar and critic.
- Geert Adriaans Boomgaard (1788–1899), first validated supercentenarian and last living veteran of Napoleon's Grande Armée
- Coos Cremers (1806-1882), politician, member of the Senate from 1850 to 1877
- Schelto van Heemstra, Baron Heemstra (1807–1864), politician, Prime minister from 1861 to 1862.
- Jozef Israëls (1824–1911), painter of the Hague School
- Joseph Ascher (1829–1869), composer and pianist
- Hendrik Willem Mesdag (1831–1915), marine art painter
- Samuel van Houten (1837–1930), politician, cabinet minister, founder of the Liberal Party
- Alexander de Savornin Lohman (1837–1924), politician, leader of the Christian Historical Union
- Otto Eerelman (1839–1926), painter, known for his depictions of dogs and horses
- Klaas Plantinga (1846–1922), distiller, founded the Plantinga distillery
- Heike Kamerlingh Onnes (1853–1926), Nobel laureate physicist who pioneered superconductivity
- Gerard Bolland (1854–1922), autodidact, linguist, philosopher, biblical scholar and lecturer
- René de Marees van Swinderen (1860–1955), diplomat and politician
- Barbara Elisabeth van Houten (1863–1950), painter
- Gerrit van Houten (1866–1934), painter and artist
- Dirk Jan de Geer (1870–1960), Dutch Prime Minister (1926–29, 1939–40)

== 1870–1900 ==
- Jantina Tammes (1871–1947), botanist and geneticist, first professor of genetics in the Netherlands.
- Johan Huizinga (1872–1945), historian
- Jaap Eden (1873–1925), only male athlete to have won world championships in both speed skating and cycling
- Bert Nienhuis (1873–1960), ceramist, designer, and jewelry designer
- Gerrit David Gratama (1874–1965), artist, writer, and director of the Frans Hals Museum
- Jan Gratama (1877–1947), architect
- Albert Hahn (1877–1918), political cartoonist, poster artist, and book cover designer
- C. U. Ariëns Kappers (1877–1946), neurologist and anatomist
- Herman de Vries de Heekelingen (1880–1942), scholar and author, professor of palaeography at the University of Nijmegen
- Julia Culp (1880–1970), mezzo-soprano
- Dirk Janssen (1881–1986), gymnast in the 1908 Summer Olympics who was 105 at the time of his death, making him the longest-lived Olympic competitor
- Jonny Heykens (1884–1945), composer of light classical music
- Wilhelm Baehrens (1885–1929), classical scholar
- Jan Janssen (1885–1953), gymnast who competed in the 1908 Summer Olympics
- Tonnis van der Heeg (1886-1958), trade unionist and political activist
- Pieter Korteweg (1888–1970), philatelist
- Alida Jantina Pott (1888–1931), artist
- Alidius Tjarda van Starkenborgh Stachouwer (1888–1978), last colonial Governor-General of the Netherlands East Indies
- Jaap Kunst (1891–1960), ethnomusicologist
- Michel Velleman (1895–1943), Jewish magician
- Hendrik de Vries (1896–1989), poet and painter, early surrealist
- Paul Schuitema (1897–1973), graphic artist

== 1900–1930 ==
- Ulbo de Sitter (1902–1980), geologist at Leiden University, founder of school of structural geology
- Jan Wolthuis (1903–1983), lawyer and collaborator, active in far-right politics after WWII
- Hans Dirk de Vries Reilingh (1908–2001), geographer and professor
- Elie Aron Cohen (1909–1993), doctor, Auschwitz survivor
- Theodoor Overbeek (1911–2007), professor of physical chemistry at Utrecht University
- Pieter Meindert Schreuder (1912–1945), resistance leader
- Lucas Hoving (1912–2000), modern dancer, choreographer and teacher
- Jacob B. Bakema (1914–1981), modernist architect
- Anno Smith (1915–1990), artist, ceramist, painter, sculptor, and art teacher
- Andries Jan Pieters (1916–1952), collaborator, executed for war crimes
- Evert Musch (1918–2007), painter and professor at Academie Minerva
- Poppe Damave (1921–1988), painter
- Selma Engel-Wijnberg (1922–2018), Jewish Holocaust survivor
- Henk Visser (1923–2006), arms and armory collector
- Jan Drenth (1925–2025), chemist, was professor of structural chemistry at the University of Groningen
- Cor Edskes (1925–2015), authority on the history of organ music and building
- Wim Crouwel (born 1928), graphic designer, type designer and typographer.
- Maarten Schmidt (1929–2022), astronomer named and optically identified a quasar
- Jan Borgman (born 1929), astronomer and university administrator
- Dirk Bolt (born 1930), architect and town planner in Australia

== 1930–1950 ==
- Ida Vos (1931–2006), writer and poet
- Arie van Deursen (1931–2011), early modern period historian
- Nico Habermann (1932–1993), computer scientist
- Gerrit Krol (1934−2013), author, essayist and writer
- Jaap Scherpenhuizen (1934−2012), politician
- Ad van Luyn (born 1935), Roman Catholic bishop
- Bert de Vries (born 1938), politician
- Andries van Dam (born 1938), professor of computer science at Brown University
- Wim T. Schippers (born 1942), artist, comedian, television director and voice actor
- Driek van Wissen (1943–2010), poet
- Chas Gerretsen (born 1943), war photographer, photo journalist
- Martha Vonk-van Kalker (1943–2022), Senator
- Elske ter Veld (1944-2017), politician
- Joanna Gash (born 1944), Australian politician
- Corrie Winkel (born 1944), backstroke swimmer and silver medalist 1964 Summer Olympics
- Jan Sloot (1945–1999), inventor, claimed to have invented a revolutionary data compression technique
- Andy Anstett (born 1946), Dutch-born Canadian politician
- Wubbo Ockels (1946–2014), physicist and astronaut of the European Space Agency
- Alphons Orie (born 1947), lawyer specialising in criminal law
- Alfred Lagarde (1948–1998), voice actor
- Diederik Grit (1949–2012), translator and translation scholar
- Sierd Cloetingh (born 1950), professor of earth sciences at Utrecht University

== 1950–present ==
- Tonny van de Vondervoort (born 1950), politician
- Pete Hoekstra (born 1953), United States ambassador to the Netherlands
- Ellen van Wolde (born 1954), biblical scholar
- Hanneke Kappen (born 1954), singer, radio and TV presenter
- Rob Nanninga (1955–2014), skeptic, writer, board member of Stichting Skepsis
- Bert Meijer (born 1955), organic chemist
- Gerard de Korte (born 1955), Roman Catholic bishop
- Joep Franssens (born 1955), composer
- Jan van der Kooi (born 1957), painter of figurative art
- Anita Buma (born 1958), pioneer Antarctic researcher
- Lex Cazemier (born 1958), speed skater
- Tjibbe Veldkamp (born 1962), author of children's books
- Wilma Mansveld (born 1962), politician
- Aernout Mik (born 1962), artist
- Peter Hofstee (born 1962), physicist and computer scientist
- Hans van den Hende (born 1964), Roman Catholic bishop
- Gerard Kemkers (born 1967), speed skating bronze medalist at 1988 Winter Olympics
- Didy Veldman (born 1967), choreographer
- J. Maarten Troost (born 1969), travel writer
- Stephan Veen (born 1970), field hockey player in the 1996 and 2000 Summer Olympics
- Sharon Dijksma (born 1971), politician
- Diederik Samsom (born 1971), politician
- Michiel van Veen (born 1971), politician
- Attje Kuiken (born 1977), politician and former civil servant
- Rudmer Heerema (born 1978), politician
- Rutger Smith (born 1981), track and field athlete
- Henk Nijboer (born 1983), politician
- Sophie Polkamp (born 1984), field hockey athlete, two-time Olympic champion
- Kim Feenstra (born 1985), model
- Marijn Nijman (born 1985), former international cricketer
- Manja Smits (born 1985), politician
- Bauke Mollema (born 1986), cyclist
- Lorena Klijn (born 1987), kickboxer
- Tom-Jelte Slagter (born 1989), professional road racing cyclist
- Lois Abbingh (1992), handball player
- Jur P. van den Berg (born 1981), computer engineer
- Jorden van Foreest (born 1999), chess grandmaster

== See also ==
- List of Dutch people
