= Herman Kruyder =

Dutch painter

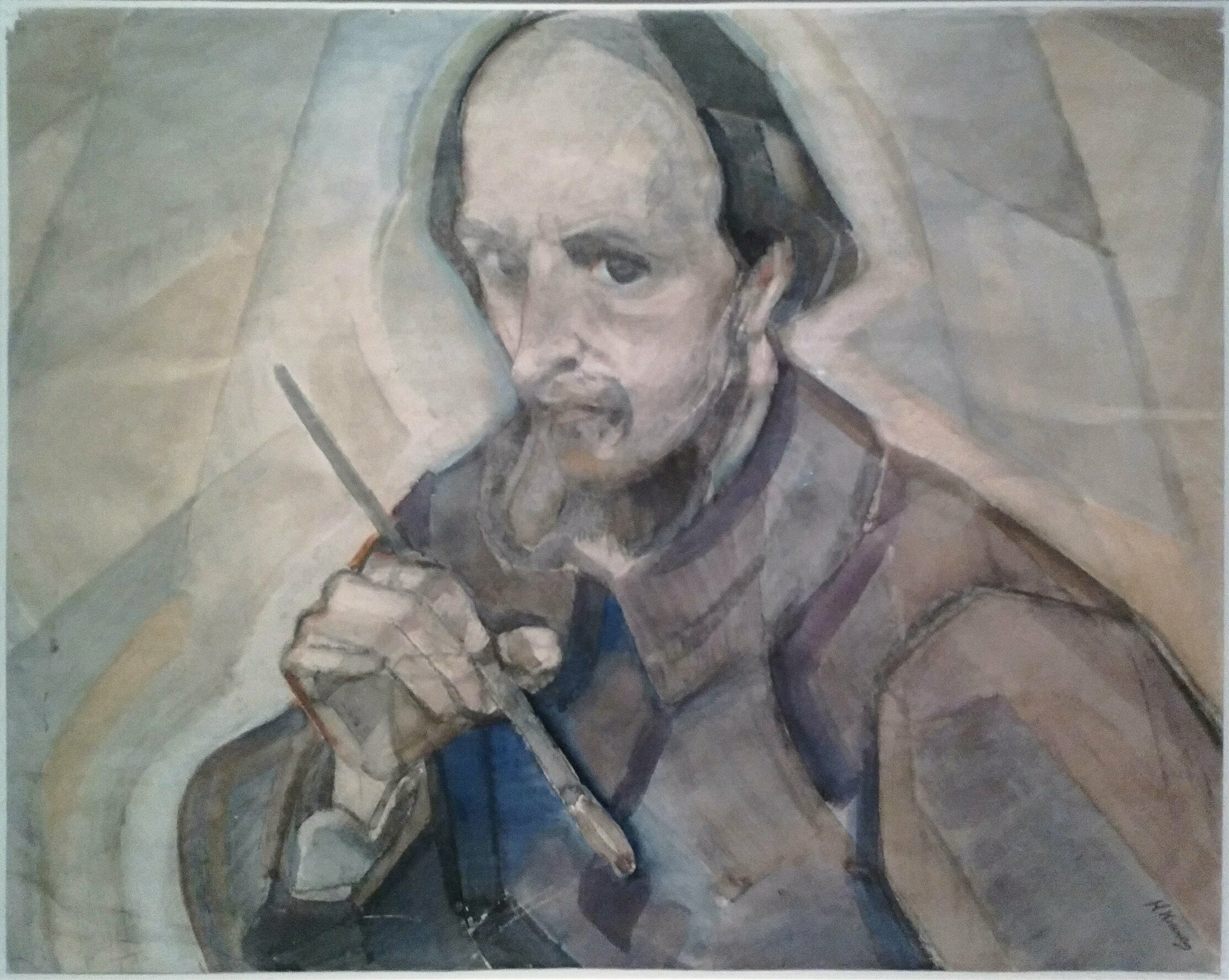
This self-portrait of Kruyder was exhibited in 1917 and shows the influence of Cubist painter Henri Le Fauconnier.

Herman Kruyder (1881–1935) was a Dutch painter.

He was born in Baarn. According to the RKD he married the artist Jo Bouman and worked with Henri Boot in Haarlem around 1905. He was a member of Kunstkring Haarlem and Kunst zij ons doel. Later in 1930 he moved back to the Gooi where he became a member of the Gooise Kunstkring.

He died in Amsterdam.
