= Hendrik van Borssum Buisman =

Dutch painter

Hendrik van Borssum Buisman (1873, Wieringen – 1951, Haarlem), was a 20th-century painter from the Northern Netherlands who became the keeper of the print room or art cabinet at Teylers Museum in 1913.

== Biography ==
According to the RKD he was a pupil of Adolf le Comte and Oswald Wenckebach. He joined the Royal Academy of Art in The Hague at the age of 19, where he was a pupil of Le Comte together with Gerrit David Gratama. They became friends and after 3 years of study together, the painter Willem Maris advised them to go to Antwerp for further study, which they did in the company of Simon Maris, Willem's son. In Antwerp they were pupils of Albrecht De Vriendt and Henri Heymans, and their friends were Toon Dupuis, Isidoor Opsomer, Walter Vaes and H.J. Wouter. Upon completion of their studies they returned to The Hague, where Hen Buisman added his grandmother's name to his own and created his bust of Speenhoff with which he won a golden medal in Munich. In 1912 Gratama moved to Haarlem to become director of the Frans Hals Museum there and a year later his friend Van Borssum Buisman succeeded John F. Hulk as Casteleyn and keeper of the art collection at Teylers Museum, where he lived in the Fundatiehuis and where his sons Jan Hendrik and Garrelt were born. He married Miss J.C.M. Sleeswijk, who assisted him with running the Teylers cabinet. Under his direction, the prints and drawings of the Teylers cabinet were shown in various exhibitions, and on Pieter Teyler's birthday, he personally displayed special selections of prints and drawings to the public in "kunstbeschouwingen" in the Teyler tradition.

He was a member of the Amsterdam painters club Arti et Amicitiae, chairman of the Fund for Sculptors, and jury member for the local Kunst Zij Ons Doel art club. As an artist he made numerous portraits of various people in Haarlem, including group portraits in the Haarlem tradition for the regents of the Doopsgezinde Weeshuis.

During his tenure he reorganized the Teylers showrooms, and placed important prints and drawings on permanent display for the first time by mounting them on the wall in frames covered by curtains, to protect them from damage by daylight that is traditionally the main light source in the museum. Today prints and drawings are only put on display in the print room and book room, where there are no windows. He was also the curator during World War II, and oversaw the conservation of the collection in bunkers in the nearby dunes.

His son Jan made a portrait of him in a bust that resides in the Teylers coin cabinet today. Jan became the next Casteleyn, and more than 20 years after the death of his father, he also became art curator of the Museum.
