= Jan van Borssum Buisman =

Dutch painter

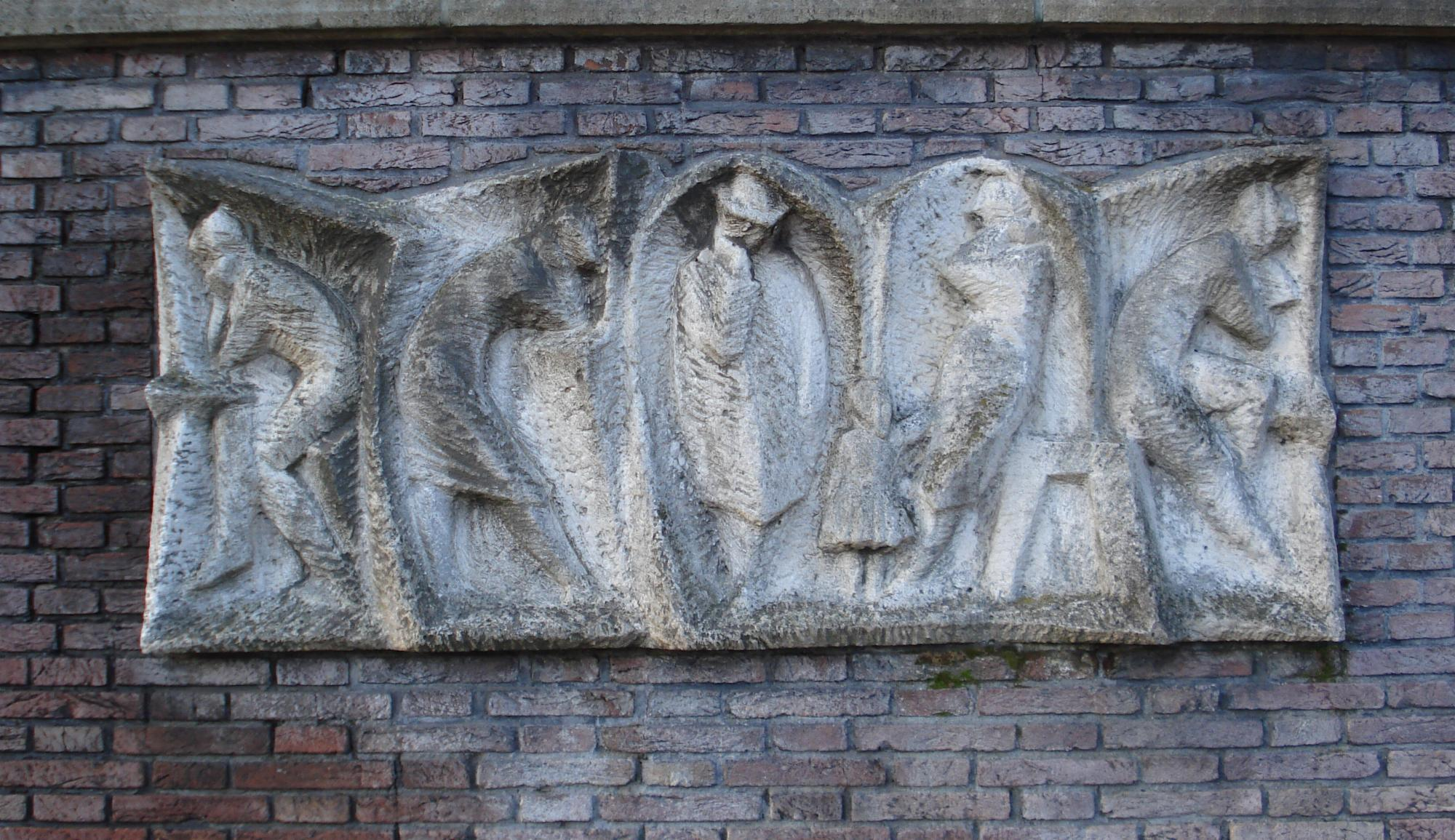
Relief in Vlaardingen

Jan Hendrik van Borssum Buisman (1919, Haarlem – 23 February 2012, Haarlem), was a 20th-century painter from the Netherlands.

== Biography ==
According to the RKD he was the son of Hendrik van Borssum Buisman. He was born in the Fundatiehuis while his father was curator at the Teylers Museum. He was a secret agent working on the "Zwitserse weg" during World War II and was decorated with the Ridder in de Orde van Oranje-Nassau, the Verzetsherdenkingkruis, and the Croix du combattant volontaire de la Résistance. His brother Garrelt was awarded the Military William Order. After the war he served as a member of the staff for Prins Bernhard in 1945-1946, and then moved back to Haarlem where he became a member of the Haarlem painters club Kunst zij ons doel, and in 1951, a member of De Groep. In 1952 he became kastelein at the Teylers Museum, like his father had been. He lived in the Fundatiehuis until he retired, when he moved to an adjoining house. He kept his workshop in the former astronomical laboratory in the garden, and in 1972 he became adjunct-curator of the art collection.
