= Kunst zij ons doel =

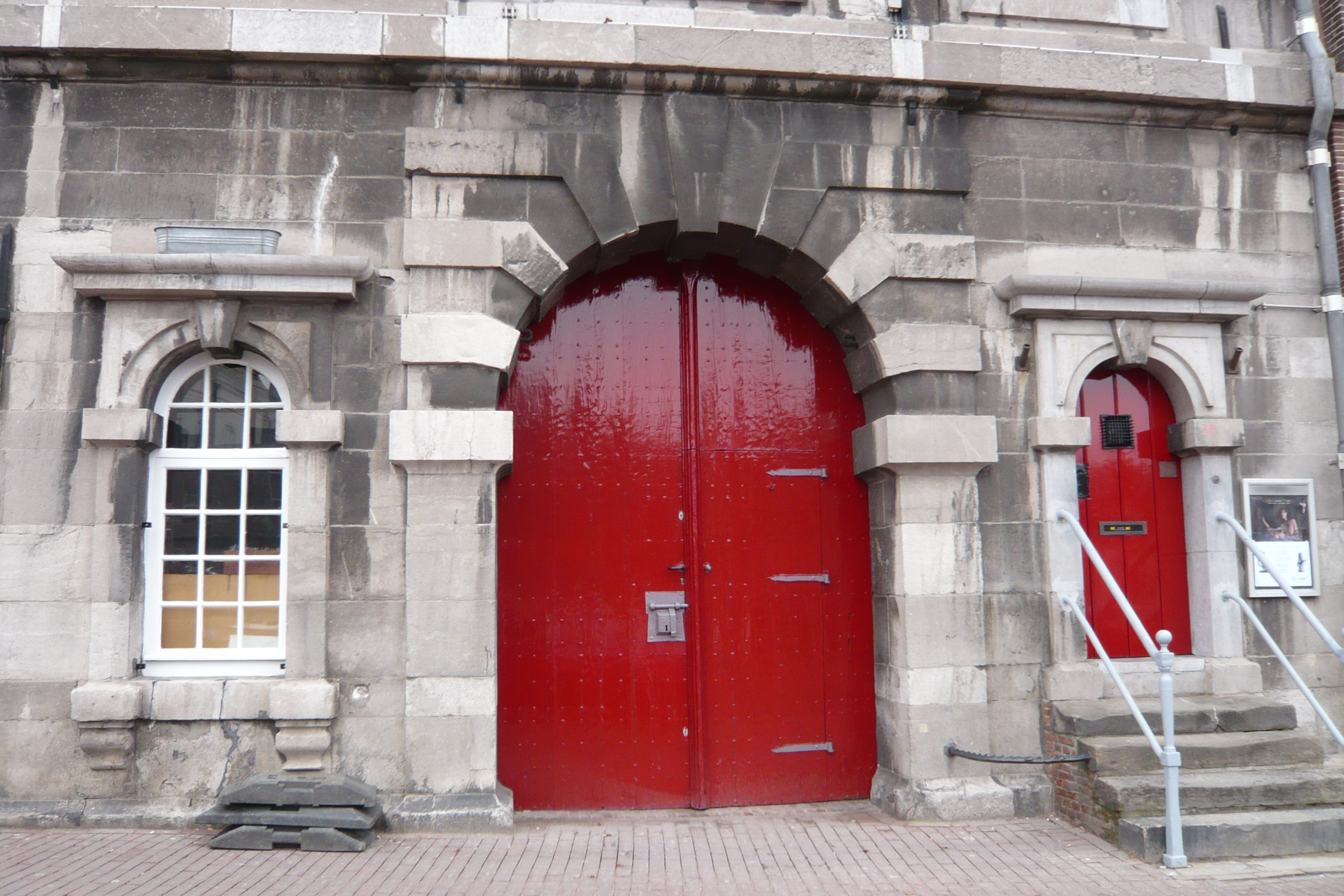
The door on the right with the stairs is the entrance to KZOD.

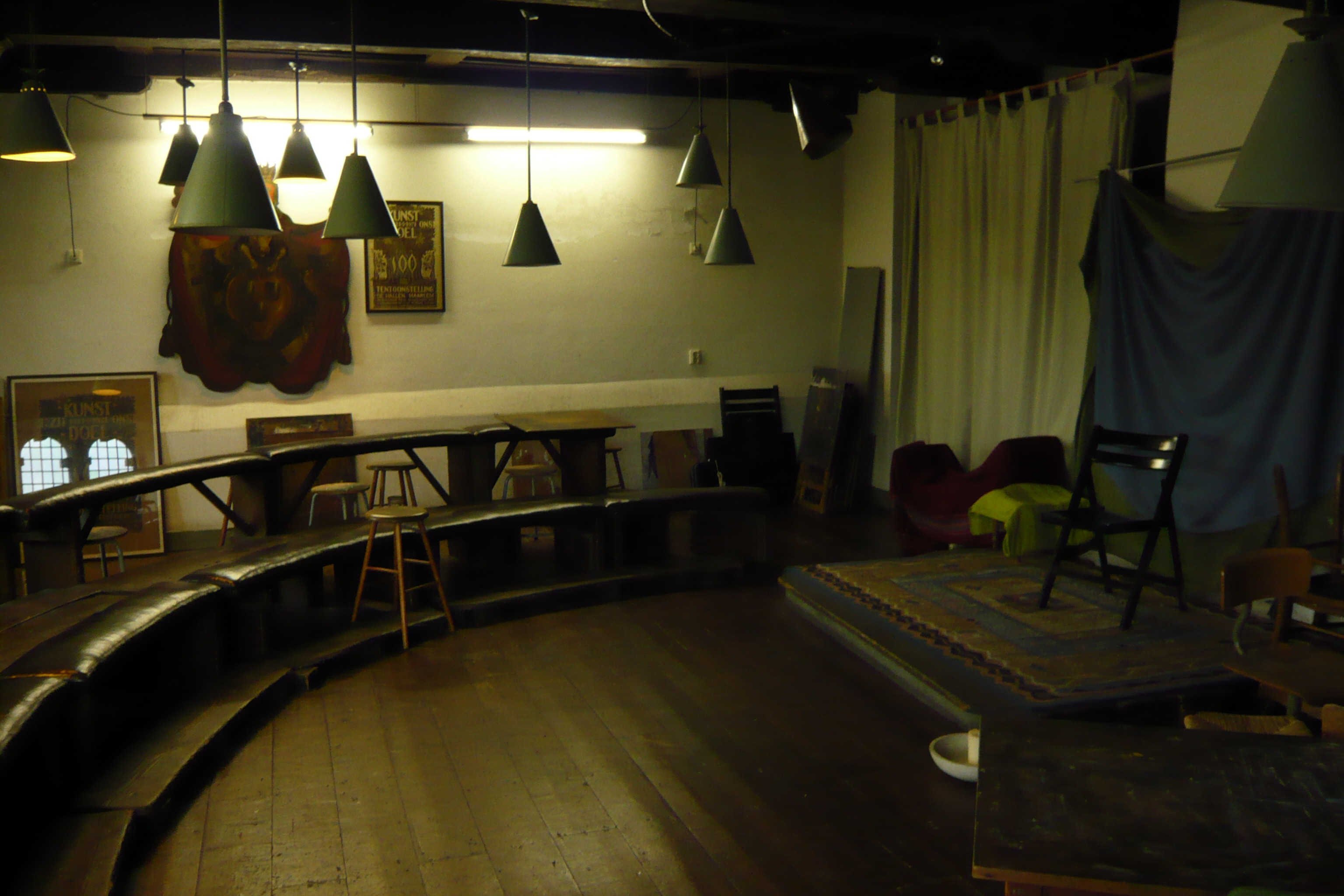
The drawing room. According to archives, prominent members could sit closest to the model, and other members sat in the back. Some of those sitting on the rear benches in the 20th century were women. Women were allowed to become working members in 1892, and in 1900 women were allowed to participate in the drawing evenings from live model.

Kunst zij ons doel, or KZOD, (English: Art be our aim) is the name of an artists club in the Waag, Haarlem.

== History ==
The Society was founded in 1821 as the continuation of the 'Haarlemse Teekenacademie', established in 1772 by Cornelis van Noorde, Tako Hajo Jelgersma, Hendrik de Meijer, Christiaan Henning, Leendert Overbeek and Paul van Liender in the fundatiehuis set up by Pieter Teyler van der Hulst, who was one of the directors. After Teyler died they moved to the Warmoesstraat around the corner. That society was started as a drawing academy that was connected to the Haarlem Guild of St. Luke. The drawing academy ran into financial difficulties when the guilds were disbanded in 1794. It died entirely when its most fervent leader, Cornelis van Noorde, died in 1795.

His friend and co-director, Wybrand Hendriks, took the initiative to start a new society called the Teekencollegie. Hendriks was curator of the Teylers Museum, and he took over the inventory of plaster casts from the academie and set up a new educational group, which changed its name in 1809 to "Kunstmin en Vlijt". In 1820 a few artists left this group and started a new group called "Kunst Zij Ons Doel", and when "Kunstmin en Vlijt" closed down in 1826, this group became the only artist collective in Haarlem. The group attracted many young members in the first 50 years of its existence. From 1841 KZOD received 200 guilders a year from the Teylers Stichting, when it moved its quarters to the Waag.

The "KZOD" is the oldest professional association of visual artists in the Netherlands still in existence today. Prominent artists who have worked there as members were Andreas Schelfhout, Jan Hendrik van Borssum Buisman, Hendrik Jacobus Scholten, and the glass artists Willem Bogtman and Nico Schrier. After the First World War the society became less of an educational institution and more of a club. Exhibitions were organized in the Waag, and later in a new exhibition hall in the Frans Hals Museum. Regular exhibitions are now held at the Waag as a sales venue and curious visitors can peek out the windows over the Spaarne and view the scene of many KZOD drawing classes as they view the modern works on sale.

== De Groep ==
In 1951 a group of members split off to form a new group, because they felt that younger artists, sculptors and etchers were not well represented. Prominent members of 'De Groep' were: Jan Hendrik van Borssum Buisman, Jules Chapon, Jac Clay, Poppe Damave (chairman), Edgar Fernhout, Frans Funke, Cor Hak, Kees Hak, Anton Heyboer, Marjan Jaspers, Roelof Klein (sculptor), Bart van der Leck, Albert Loots, Jan Meijer, Hans Mulder, Wim Oepts, Kees Okx, Piet Ouborg, Jaap Ploos van Amstel, John Rädecker, Georges Robèr, Charles Roelofsz, Arie Schouten, Wim Schuhmacher, Bert Schutter, Wim Steijn, Levinus Tollenaar, Charley Toorop, Frans Verpoorten, and Jan Wiegers

== Members ==
Members were and are Ben Andréa, Albert Arens, Truida Baaren-Ruysenaars, Nel Bakema, Harry Balm, Elizabeth Frederika van der Ban, Bauk Cornelis Betzema, Han Bijvoet, Willem Bogtman, Eduard van Bommel, Henri Frédéric Boot, Jan Hendrik van Borssum Buisman, Francina Boven, Anneke Brinkhorst-Wiggers de Vries, Marius van der Burg, Johannes Cornelis Busé, Simon Busé, Mies Callenfels-Carsten, Johannes Clausing, Lily van Cleeff-Simon, Marijke Cosse, Poppe Damave, Jan Bernaard De Lange, Mies Deinum, Louis van Dijk, Cor Dik, Henriëtte Dingemans-Numans, Jacobus Doeser, Fré Drost, Hendricus van Eeuwijk, Piet van Egmond, Piet van den Eijnde, Johannes van der Elst, Fanny Enthoven, Han Faken, Johannes Philippus Theodorus Gall, Jan van Geem, Roelf Gerbrands, Helena Elisabeth Goudeket, Jacoba Greven, Jos van Grieken, Jac. Groot, Remco van der Gugten, Claude Guichard, Jan Habets, Dries Havermans, Jacob de Heer Kloots, Herta de Heer, Simon de Heer, Marinus Heijnes, Herman Heuff, Johannes Heuperman, Tine Honig, Douwe Mattheus Hoogeveen, Jos Hoogwout, Florette Horninge-Jacobs, Albert Hovenkamp, Gerard Huijsser, Adrianus Lambertus Huyser, Dirk Jansen, Wim Jonker, Dirk Jan Hendrik Joosten, August Eduard Wilhelm Hugo Kammer, Johan Bernard Kamp, Gerard Kerkhoff, Catharine Klees, Roelof Klein, Henk Klijn, Samuel Klinkenberg, Piet Kloes, Willem Kooiman, Joop Koopman, Dingeman Korf, Anton L. Koster, Gerard Kroone, Cornelis Jacobus Aart Kruijt, Herman Kruyder, Kees Laan, Hilda Lucretia Maria Laarman, Frans Lammers, Daan de Lange, Jan Larij, Cornelis Lieste, Henk van der Linden, Jan Loots, Cor Mandersloot, Henriëtte Marcus, Frans Meijer, Hanne Meijer-de Heer, Oscar Mendlik, Geertruid A. Meursinge Reijnders, Adrianus Miolée, Helmert Richard Mulder, Bertha Müller, Eric de Nie, Arie van Noort, Willem Hendrik van Norden, Cornelis Olff, Mia van Oostveen, Jacobus Petrus Cornelis van Os, Pieter Frederik van Os, Miek Otto, Frank Donkers, Otto van Os, Joop Rooijers, Jaap Pander, Maria H.Barbara Pekàrek, Hubert Willem Plaatzer van den Hull, Johan Plas, Christiaan Pointl, Jan Pool, Adam Potgieter, Jaap Pronk, Maria Pronk-Rompelman, Agnes Rademakers, Ina Rahusen, Willem Karel Rees, Laurens Floris van Reijsen, Johannes Cornelis Gerardus A. Roest, Nicolaas Johannes Roosenboom, Huib de Ru, Jan Rusman, Josef Santen, Martinus Savrij, Marianna Christina Schakel, Andreas Schelfhout, Hendrik Jacobus Scholten, Henk Schoorl, Nico Schrier, Jeanne Schwartz, Frederik Wilhelm Sinnecker, Freek Souwer, Johan Spaling, Leen Spierenburg, Joop Stoffels, Frederik Teding van Berkhout, Margaretha C. Verheus, Ab Vermeulen, Wouter Verschuur, Jan Visser, Anton Mauve, Elias Voet, Leendert de Vogel, Barend van Voorden, Anton Voorzanger, Hendrik de Vries, Jakob Sijbout de Vries, Fred van der Wal, Jan Bronner, Simon Walbrecht, Jan van Wensveen, Hendrik Jan Wesseling, Hendrik George Breitner, Piet Wetselaar, Jan P.A. Wiegman, Joop Ockers, Ronald Vengen, Piet Wiegman, Jaap Wigersma, Willem Abraham de Wijn, Henk Willems, Peter Peterse, Jaap Wagemaker, Leo van Velzen, Mieke Mostermans, Reinier Heiloo, Jacoba Ritsema, Anton Misset, Henk Ames, Ru de Huib, Hans van der Graft, Hans de Bruin, Arjan Bosch, Rob van Bruggen, Peter Brunsmann, Arnold Janssen, Rob Clous, Marjan van Berkel, Lucia Bezemer, Rob Daniels, Caroline Doornenbal, Hans Duivenvoorden, Walter van Dieren, Lizan van Dijk, Helene van Dongen, Ellen Wolff and Elsa Woutersen-van Doesburgh.
