= Levinus Tollenaar =

Dutch artist

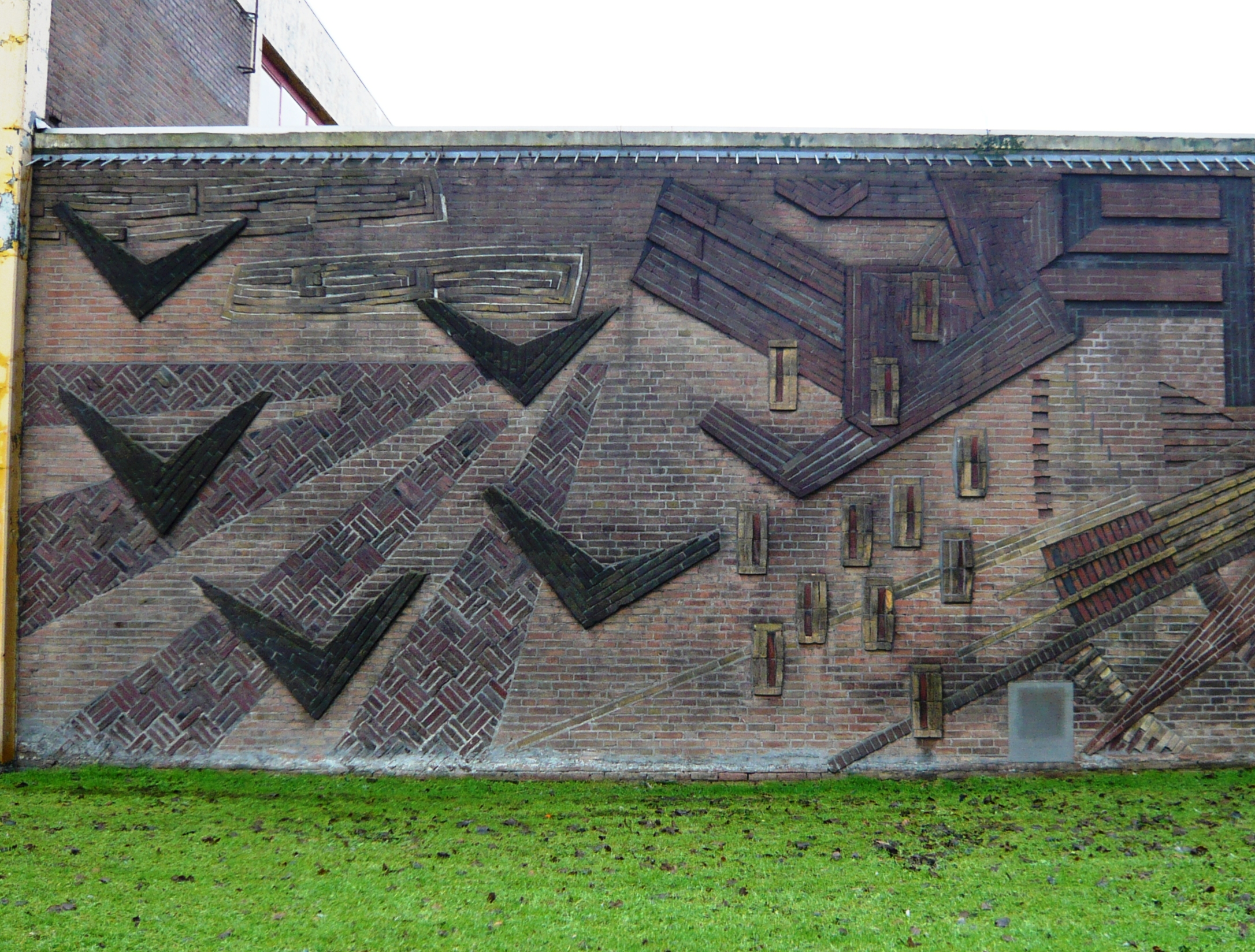
"Hand sows grain in a field with birds", part of an allegory on baking bread, 1962–1963, Paul Krugerkade, Haarlem

Levinus Tollenaar (1918 – 1970), was a Dutch artist.

== Biography ==
Levinus (Levien) Tollenaar, born on December 2, 1918, in Haarlem and died on April 7, 1970, in Haarlem, was a visual artist.

After secondary school (HBS), he did not have the financial means to continue his studies. He learned to master techniques and develop his artistic skills through practical work.

The materials he liked to work with were stained glass, sandblasted glass, ceramics, and brick. Among other things, he created brick mosaics on the walls of buildings. He received commissions from all over the country, but most of his work was carried out in the Kennemerland region. In addition to being a visual artist, he was a teacher at the Kennemer Streekschool for kindergarten teachers and, from 1946, a reviewer of visual arts for the Nieuwe Haarlemse Courant-De Tijd/Maasbode newspaper. He was also co-founder of the Haarlem Artists' Association De Groep. See also obituary in: Haerlem Jaarboek 1970, pp. 29-31.

According to the RKD he became known for monumental works in brick.
