= Jo Kruyder-Bouman =

Dutch artist (1886–1973)

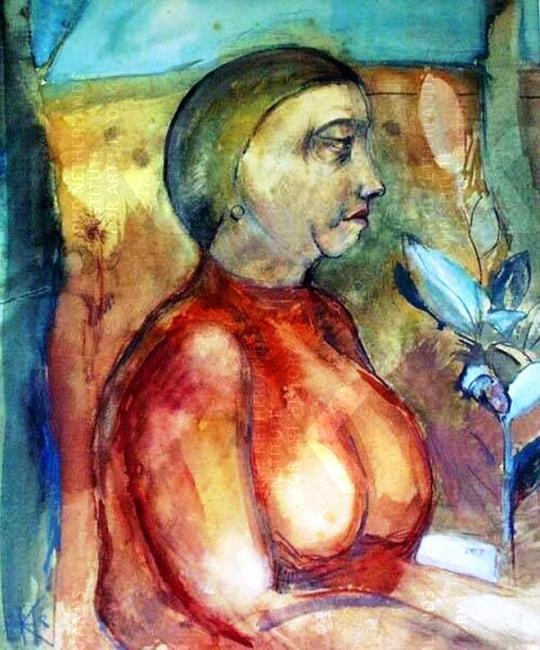
- Portrait of Jo Kruyder-Bouman by Herman Kruyder
- Born: Jo Bouman; 6 April 1886; Amsterdam, the Netherlands
- Died: 28 June 1973 (aged 87); Amersfoort, The Netherlands
- Spouse: Herman Kruyder

Johanna Laura "Jo" Kruyder-Bouman (1886–1973) was a Dutch painter.

== Biography ==
Kruyder-Bouman née Bouman was born on 6 April 1886 in Amsterdam. From 1904 to 1908 she studied at the Rijksakademie van beeldende kunsten (State Academy of Fine Arts) in Amsterdam. From 1909 to 1912 studied at School voor Kunstnijverheid (Haarlem) (School for Arts and Crafts Haarlem). In 1916 she married fellow artist Herman Kruyder. She was a member of Kunstenaarsvereniging De Onafhankelijken, De Ploeg, and Amersfoorts Kunstenaars Genootschap (AKG).

Kruyder-Bouman exhibited at the annual shows of Vereeniging Sint Lucas. From 1928 through 1960 she exhibited with De Onafhankelijken (The Independents). Her work was included in the 1939 exhibition and sale Onze Kunst van Heden (Our Art of Today) at the Rijksmuseum in Amsterdam. Kruyder-Bouman illustrated several children's books including De Vilten Poppen, Jetje's Poppen, and Zondagsche Poppetjes.

Kruyder-Bouman died on 28 June 1973 in Amersfoort.
