= Henriëtte Marcus =

Dutch artist

- Born: Jeanette Henriëtte Marcus; 9 June 1891; Amsterdam, Netherlands
- Died: 2 November 1993 (aged 102); Heemstede, Netherlands
- Other names: Henriëtte Pointl
- Known for: Painting
- Spouse: C. Pointl

Jeanette Henriëtte Marcus (1891-1993) was a Dutch artist.

== Biography ==
Marcus was born on 9 June 1891 in Amsterdam. She studied in Amsterdam at the Dagtekenschool voor Kunstambachten (Day drawing school for crafts), the Rijksnormaalschool voor Teekenonderwijzers (National Normal School for Drawing Teachers), and the Rijksakademie van beeldende kunsten (State Academy of Fine Arts). Her teachers included Carel Lodewijk Dake sr., Antoon Derkinderen, and Nicolaas van der Waay. Her work was included in the 1939 exhibition and sale Onze Kunst van Heden (Our Art of Today) at the Rijksmuseum in Amsterdam. She was a member of the Kunst zij ons doel in Haarlem. Marcus died on 2 November 1993 in Heemstede at the age of 102.
