= Margaretha C. Verheus =

Dutch artist

- Born: Margaretha Christina Verheus; 16 November 1905; Amsterdam, Netherlands
- Died: 15 September 1990 (aged 84); Haarlem, Netherlands
- Other names: Margaretta van der Colk-Verheus
- Known for: Painting

Margaretha Christina Verheus (1905-1990) was a Dutch artist.

== Biography ==
Verheus was born on 16 November 1905 in Amsterdam. She attended the Rijksinstituut tot Opleiding van Tekenleraren (National Normal School for Drawing Teachers) in Amsterdam. She studied with Henri Frédéric Boot and Huib Luns. She was married to the painter Willem August van der Colk. Her work was included in the 1939 exhibition and sale Onze Kunst van Heden (Our Art of Today) at the Rijksmuseum in Amsterdam. She was a member of the Kunst zij ons doel and Kunstenaarsvereniging Sint Lucas.

Verheus died on 15 September 1990 in Haarlem. Her work is in the collection of the Rijksmuseum.
