= Henriëtte Gesina Numans =

Dutch painter

- Born: 15 August 1877; Sintang Regency
- Died: 11 May 1955 (aged 77); Zeist

Henriëtte Gesina Numans (15 August 1877 – 11 May 1955) was a Dutch painter.

Numans was born in Sintang Regency. She was trained in The Hague at the drawing school there in 1899–1900. She married the painter Waalko Jans Dingemans and they lived first in the Hague, in Nieuwkoop 1904–1911, and later in Haarlem, where he died in 1925. Henriette taught drawing at a school for girls and was a member of Kunst Zij Ons Doel there and Arti et Amicitiae in Amsterdam. Numans' work was included in the 1939 exhibition and sale Onze Kunst van Heden (Our Art of Today) at the Rijksmuseum in Amsterdam.

Numans died in Zeist.
