= Marinus Heijnes =

Dutch painter

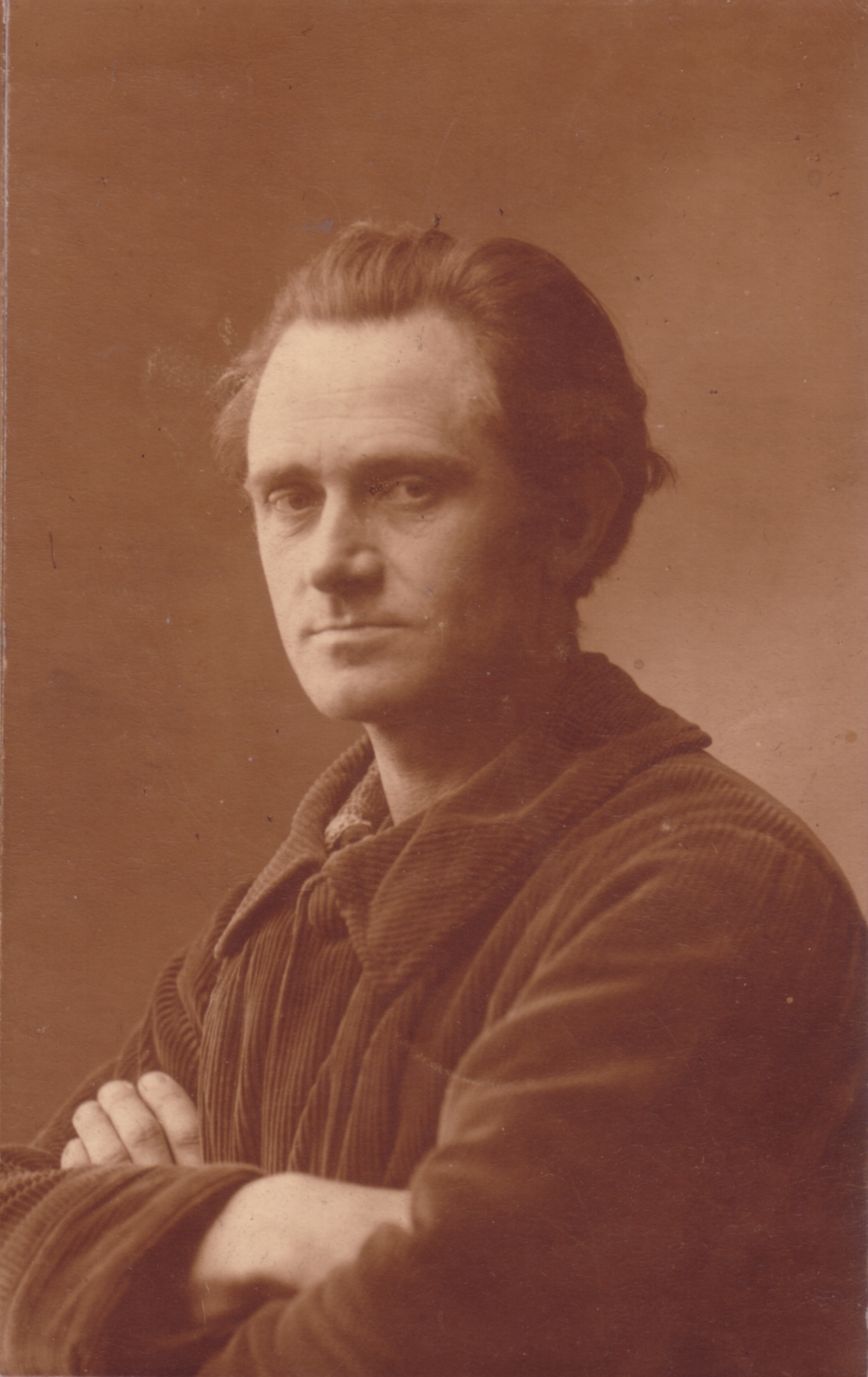
Portrait of Marinus Heijnes (1922)

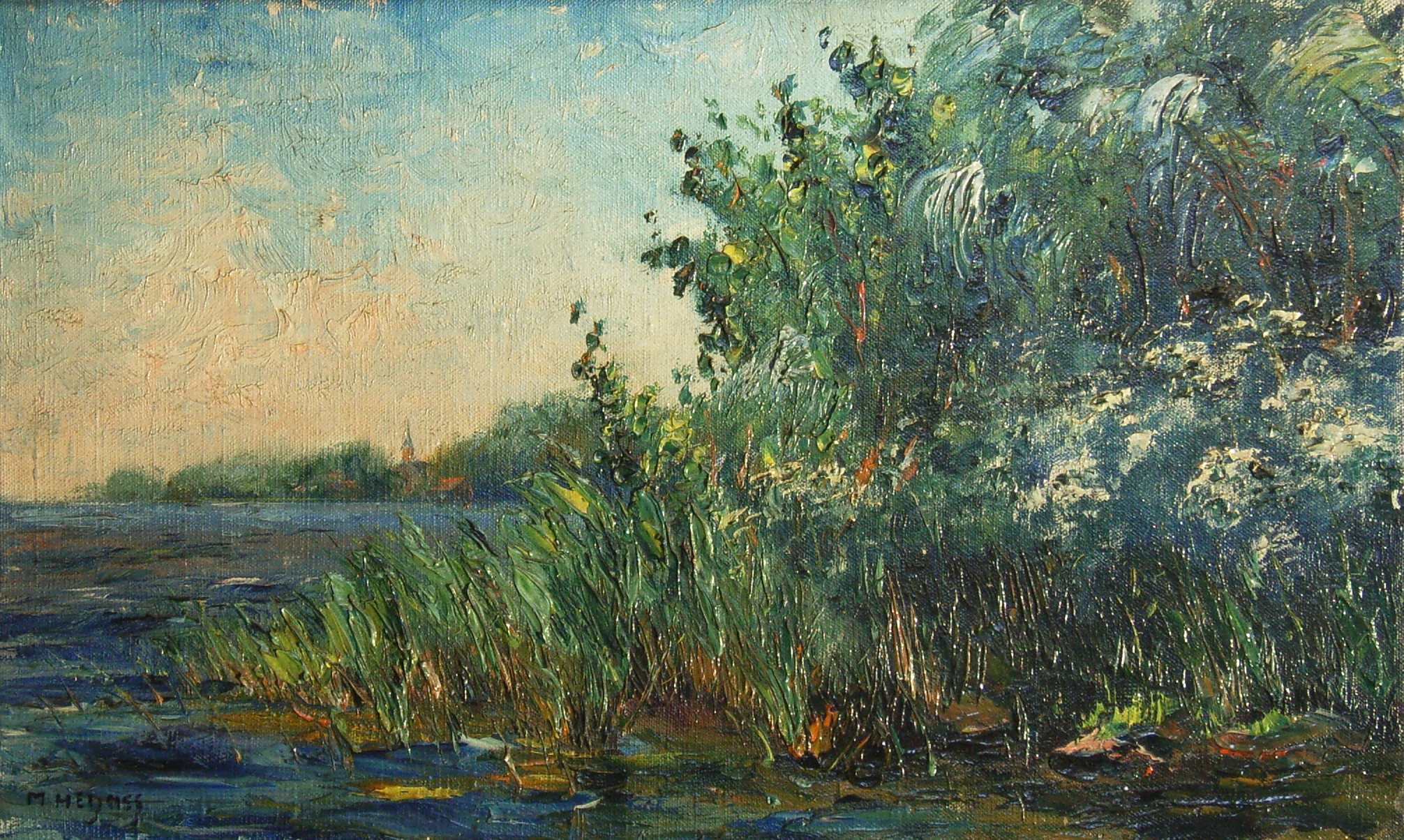
Lake Kaag, the Netherlands

Marinus Heijnes (8 March 1888 in Amsterdam – 12 February 1963 in De Kaag) was a Dutch impressionist artist who painted in the tradition of the Dutch Hague School. Heijnes had visited and painted in Switzerland (Ticino), Italy, France (Brittany, Côte d'Azur) and Sweden. Much of his work is about the Dutch lakeside near his village Kaag.

== Education and work ==
Heijnes had his education at the Quellinusschool in Amsterdam. Most of his colourful work was made in oil on canvas or watercolour. Heijnes worked 'en plein air' which means painted outdoors. Heijnes was a member of Kunst Zij Ons Doel in Haarlem.

Heijnes's work was included in the 1939 exhibition and sale Onze Kunst van Heden (Our Art of Today) at the Rijksmuseum in Amsterdam.

Marinus Heijnes was father of the aquarellist Theodoor Heynes.

== Bibliography ==
- Pieter A. Scheen, Lexicon Nederlandse Beeldende Kunstenaars 1750-1950, 1970
- S.J. Mak van Waay, Lexicon van Nederlandsche Schilders en Beeldhouwers 1870–1940, 1944
- Hans Vollmer, Allgemeinem Lexikon der bildenden Künstler des XX. Jahrhunderts
- P.M.J.E Jacobs, Beeldend Nederland : biografisch handboek, 1993
