= Hendrik Jacobus Scholten =

Dutch painter

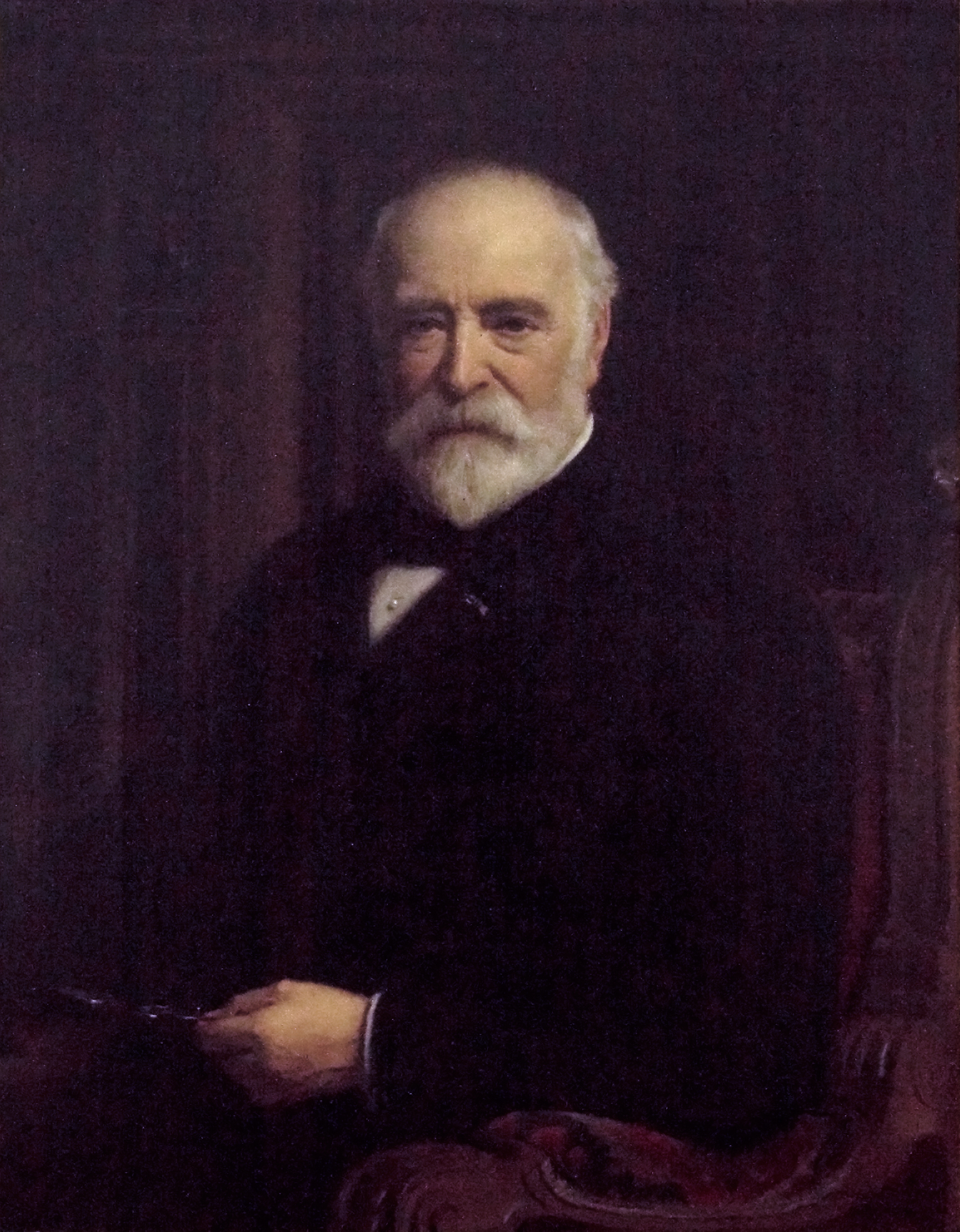
Self portrait, 1904

Hendrik Jacobus Scholten (11 July 1824, Amsterdam – 29 May 1907, Heemstede), was a 19th-century painter from the Netherlands.

== Biography ==
According to the RKD he was a pupil of Petrus Franciscus Greive and Lambertus Johannes Hansen. In 1852 he became a member of the Royal Academy of Art in Amsterdam, and was a member of the Amsterdam art societies Arti et Amicitiae, Kunstbevorderend Genootschap V.W., and Vereeniging Sint Lucas. He was also a member of art societies in other towns, such as the Pulchri studio in the Hague, the Schilder- en teekengenootschap Kunstliefde in Utrecht, and Kunst zij ons doel in Haarlem. He became art curator of the Teylers Stichting in 1872, which manages the art collection of the Teylers Museum. In that capacity he wrote a catalog of the museum's collection, that was published in 1904.

He painted several paintings that hang in the museum's galleries, as well as decorations in the Teyler's fundatiehuis, where he lived and worked from 1863 until his death.

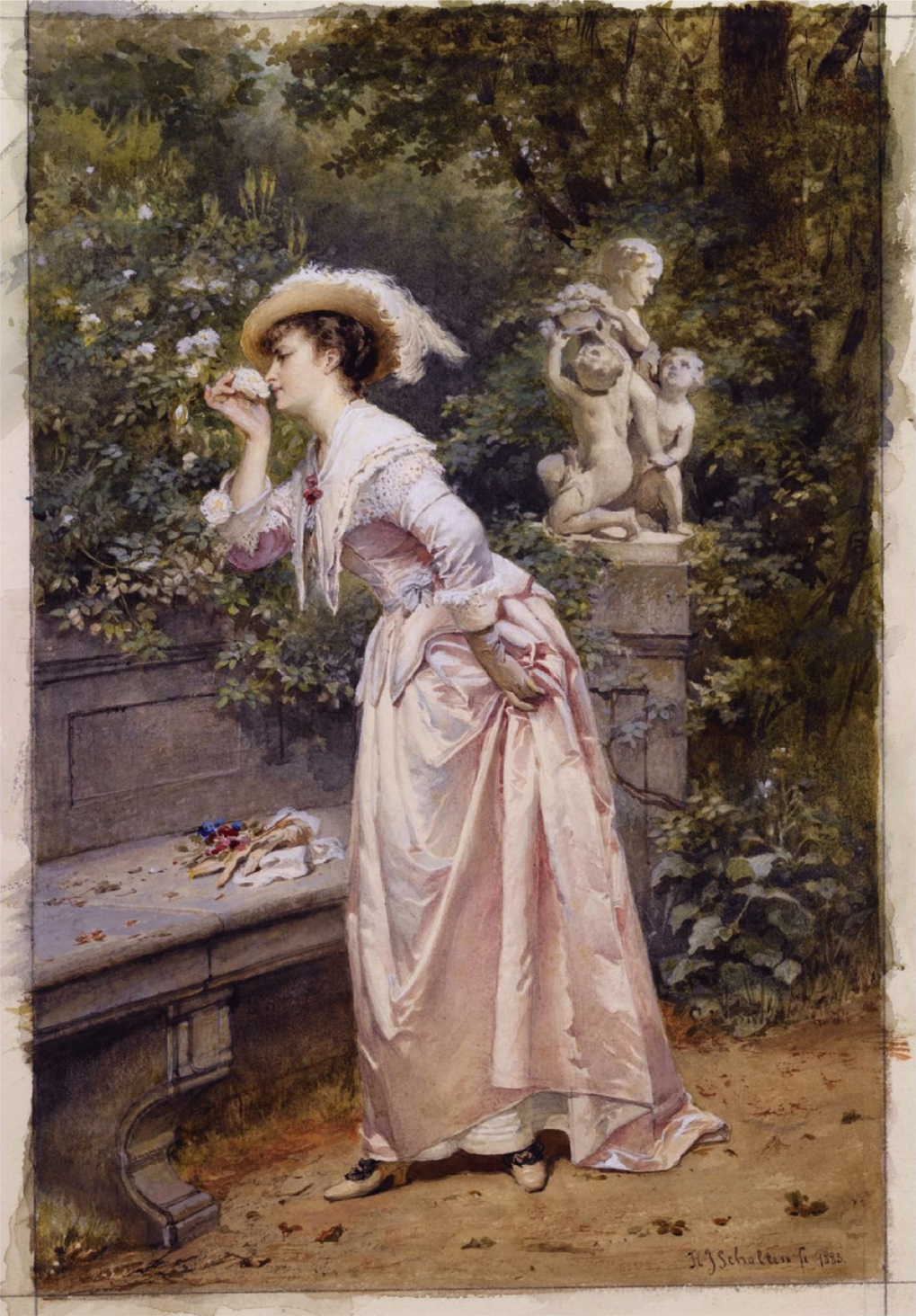
Elegant lady smelling roses

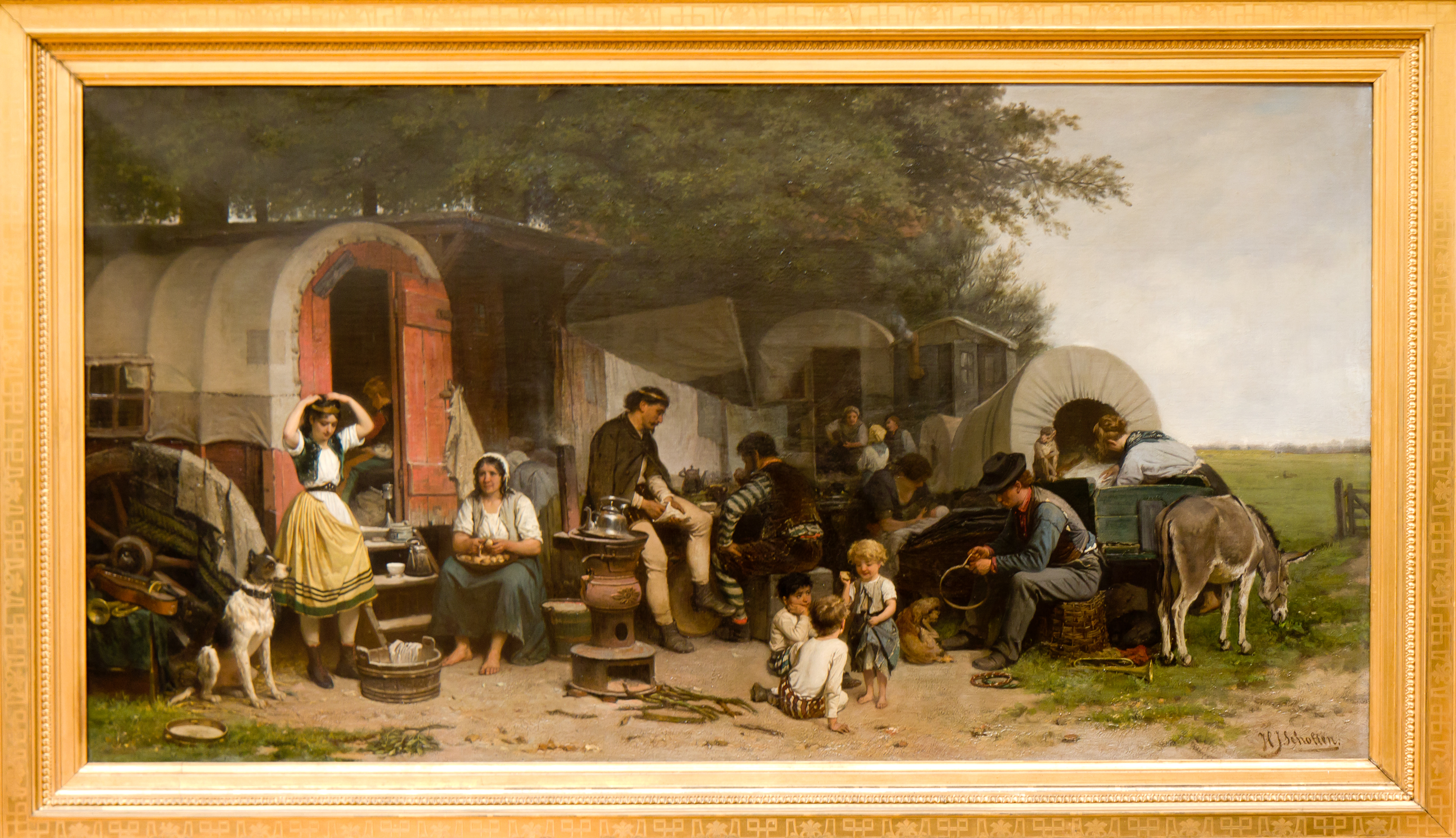
Circus workers

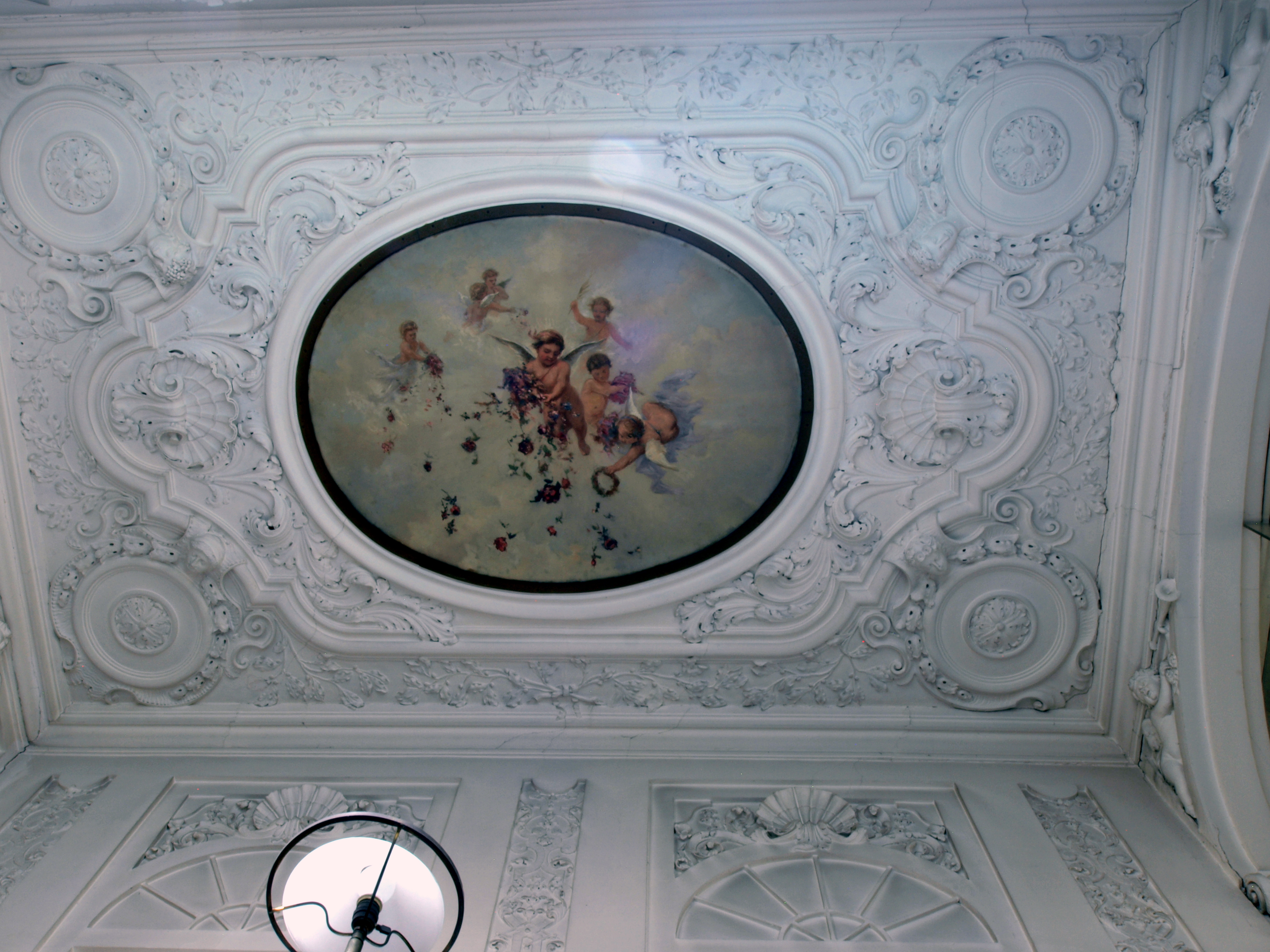
Flowers and cherubs in ceiling of Teyler's fundatiehuis

He is known for various drawings, illustrations and paintings, including landscapes, flower and pastoral scenes, and was a follower of Pieter de Hooch in his interior scenes. He contributed illustrations for the Dutch history book "De voornaamste geschiedenissen van Noord-Nederland" by Jacob van Lennep. Works by him hang in the Rijksmuseum and the Amsterdam Museum. He became the teacher of Jacobus van Looy.
