= Mies Callenfels-Carsten =

Dutch artist

- Born: Maria Petronella Carsten; 3 September 1893; Roermond, The Netherlands
- Died: 11 September 1982 (aged 89); Middelburg, The Netherlands
- Known for: Painting

Mies Callenfels-Carsten (1893-1982) was a Dutch painter.

== Biography ==
Callenfels-Carsten was born on 3 September 1893 in Roermond. She studied at the Koninklijke Academie van Beeldende Kunsten (Royal Academy of Art, The Hague). Her instructors included David Bautz, Henk Meijer (kunstenaar) and Albert Roelofs. Callenfels-Carsten was married twice. Her first husband was dr. J.N. Voorstad MD (1884-1960). Her second husband was vice-admiral J. Callenfels (1896-1961).

Callenfels-Carsten was a member of the Pulchri Studio, the Haagse Kunstkring, (The Hague Art Circle), the Kunst zij ons doel ("Art be our aim"), and the Bataviasche Kunstkring (the Bataviasche Art Circle). Her work was included in the 1939 exhibition and sale Onze Kunst van Heden (Our Art of Today) at the Rijksmuseum in Amsterdam. After her husbands retirement in 1956 she lived and painted in Veere (Zeeland) as an important member of the Veere Artists' Colony. She was the last of the nine so called Veerse Joffers, female artists who lived in Veere between 1907 until 1992.

Callenfels-Carsten died on 11 September 1982 in Middelburg.
