= Pieter Korteweg =

Dutch philatelist

- Born: 29 December 1888
- Died: 13 September 1970 (aged 81)
- Occupation: Philatelist

Pieter Cornelis Korteweg with his stamp collection

Pieter Korteweg (29 December 1888 – 13 September 1970) was a Dutch philatelist who was added to the Roll of Distinguished Philatelists in 1962.

== Philately ==
Korteweg was a specialist in the philately of his own country, particularly the postmarks, and he published several books and more than 2000 articles on Dutch philately. He was the editor of the Dutch philatelic magazine De Philatelist which he developed in the 1930s until it became the official journal of ten Netherlands philatelic associations.

In 1932 Korteweg gave a lecture in the large auditorium of the Colonial Institute in Amsterdam titled "The Indian post in earlier centuries (the Company's post, etc.)" This was attended by hundreds of members of the Royal Antiquarian Society and the Society Amstelodamum.

He was elected a member of the Royal Philatelic Society London in 1930 and subsequently became a fellow of that society.

== Family ==
Korteweg was born in Groningen. His father was a professor of surgery. Pieter married Carolina Johanna van Hasselt in 1913 and they had two daughters and a son. Korteweg died in Bennebroek.

== Awards ==
- Costerus Medal, 1934. (first person to be awarded this medal)
- Roll of Distinguished Philatelists. 1962.

== Selected publications ==
- Proevenboek. Amsterdam, 1931.
- De Kleinrondstempels van Nederland. De Philatelist, Rotterdam, 1933.
- 300 Jaar Postmerken Van Nederland 1570-1870. Netherlands, 1957.
