= Wim Steijn =

Dutch artist

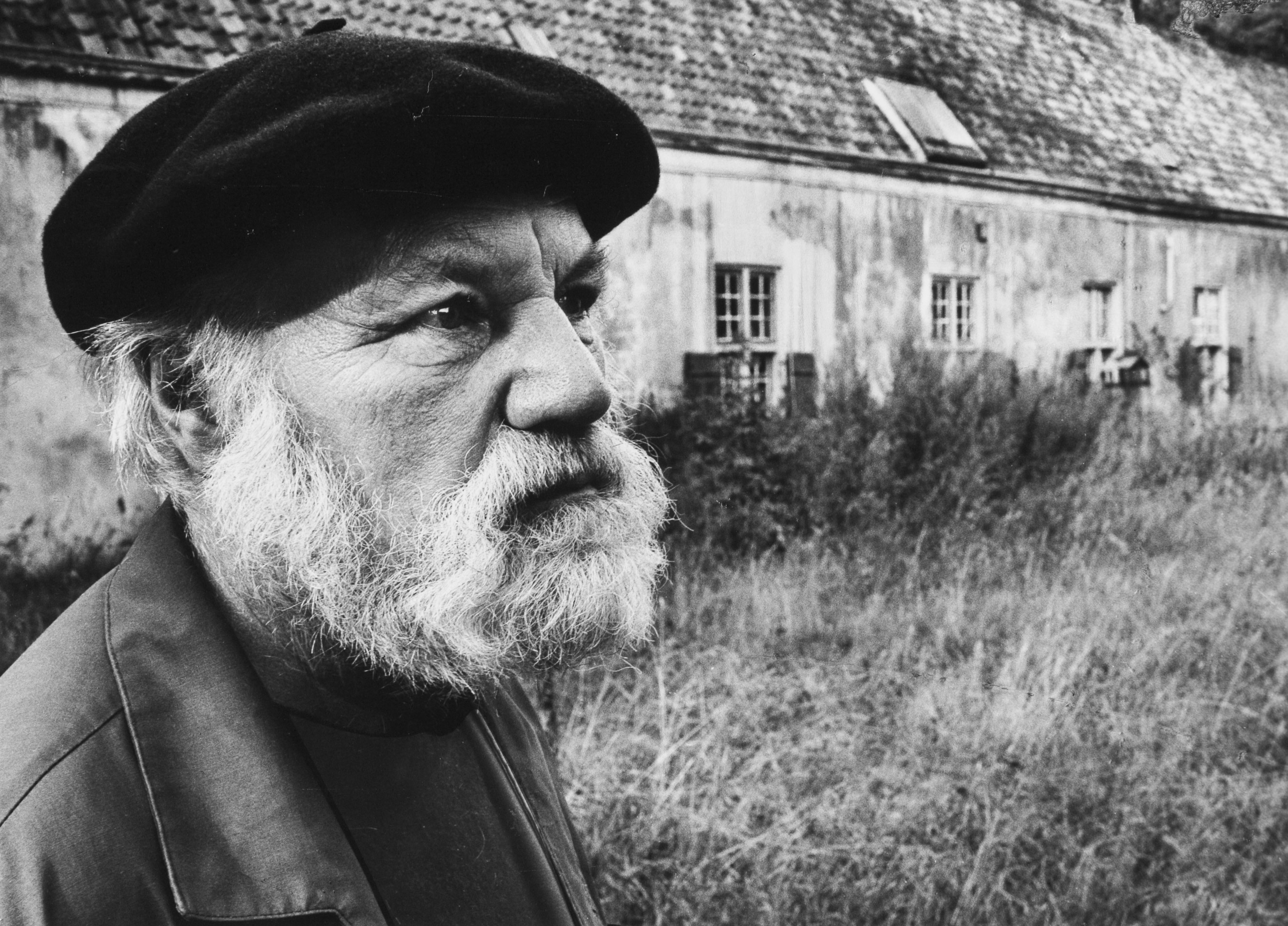
- Portrait in Bentveld, c. 1975
- Born: 28 January 1914; Assendelft, Netherlands
- Died: 23 August 1980 (aged 66); Bentveld, Netherlands
- Known for: Painting

Wim Steijn (28 January 1914, Assendelft – 23 August 1980, Bentveld), was a Dutch painter.

== Biography ==
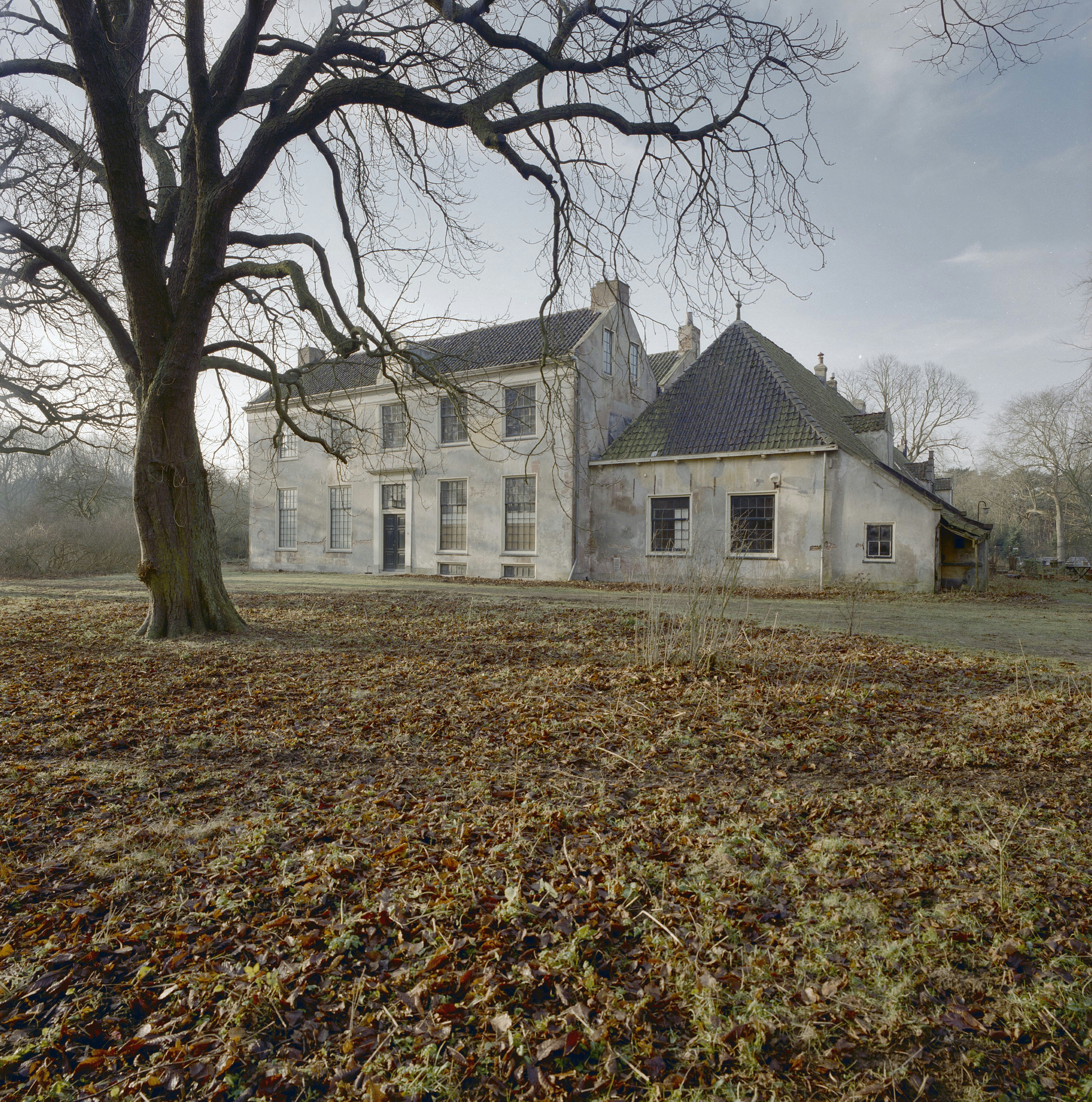
Groot Bentveld

Steijn first received training from Henk Gorter in Amsterdam before moving to Haarlem in 1935.

According to the RKD, he was a pupil of Henri Boot in 1937 and then studied for two years under Kees Verweij. Steijn's work was included in the 1939 exhibition and sale Onze Kunst van Heden (Our Art of Today) at the Rijksmuseum in Amsterdam. He lived and worked in Assendelft, Oostzaan, Jisp and Wormer. After the war, he met and married Janna Koolman, who worked for Henriëtte Louise Posthuma, the owner of the estate Groot Bentveld. He lived with her in one of the side wings of the estate where he kept his workshop.

In 1969 he was a member of the Haarlem artist society "De Groep", the Amsterdam Arti et Amicitiae, "Nederlandse Kring van Tekenaars", "De Keerkring", and "Beroepsvereniging van Beeldende Kunstenaars"(BBK) He signed his works "WSTEYN".
