= Poppe Damave =

Dutch painter

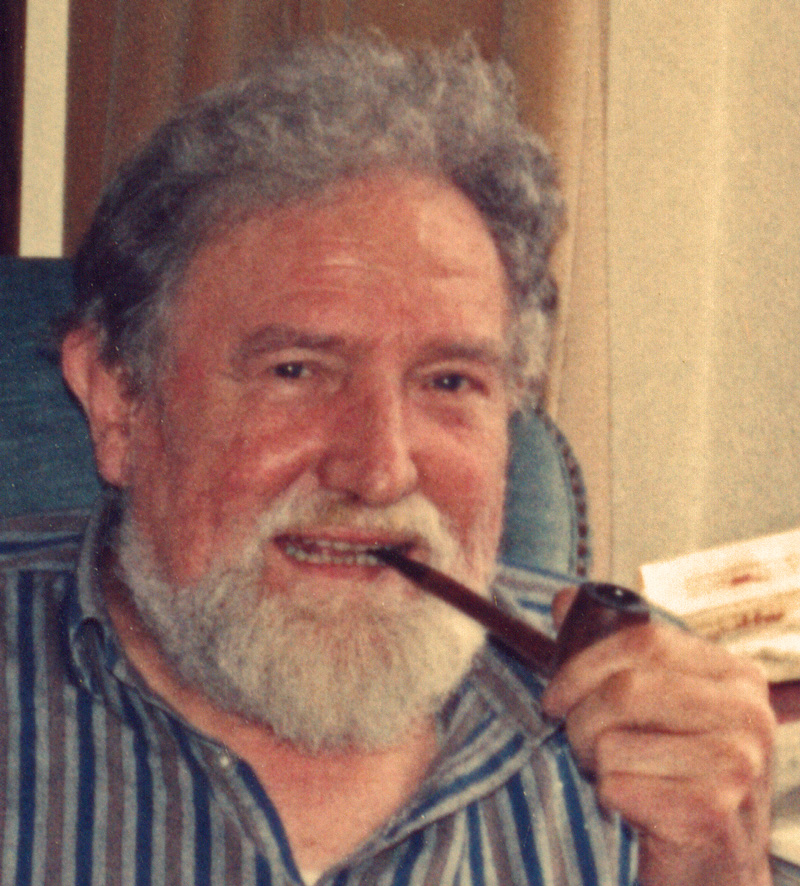

Poppe Damave (1921–1988) was a Dutch painter.

He was born in Groningen, but according to the RKD his parents moved to Haarlem when he was four, where he lived the rest of his life. He was a pupil of Henri Frédéric Boot and A.J. Grootens. He lived for 9 years on Lange Herenstraat 9 near the Haarlem railway station and until his death in 1988, on Donkere Spaarne 54. He was married to Katherina Martin and they had 6 daughters and 4 sons. He was a skilled etcher and graphic artist. During the Second World War, he used his skills to forge papers for Jewish people. He was a member of the Amsterdam artist societies Arti et Amicitiae, Hollandse Aquarellisten Kring, Nederlandse Kring van Tekenaars, and Federatie van Verenigingen van Beroeps Beeldende Kunstenaars, and the Haarlem-based Kunst zij ons doel until 1948, when he joined the Teisterbant club of Godfried Bomans. In 1951 he helped start up De Groep and was its chairman for over 15 years. He died in Bonn and he was buried in Haarlem.
