= Henri Frédéric Boot =

Dutch painter and printmaker

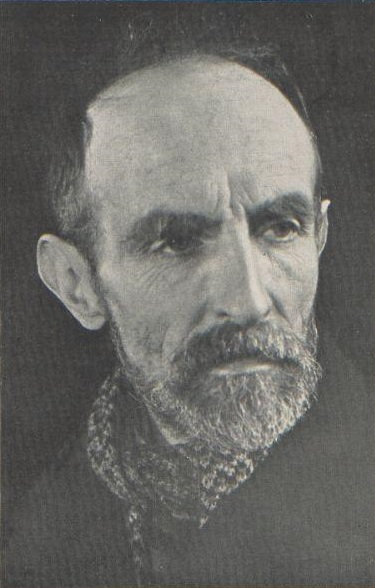
- Born: 8 February 1877; Maastricht
- Died: 3 March 1963 (aged 86); Haarlem
- Known for: Painting

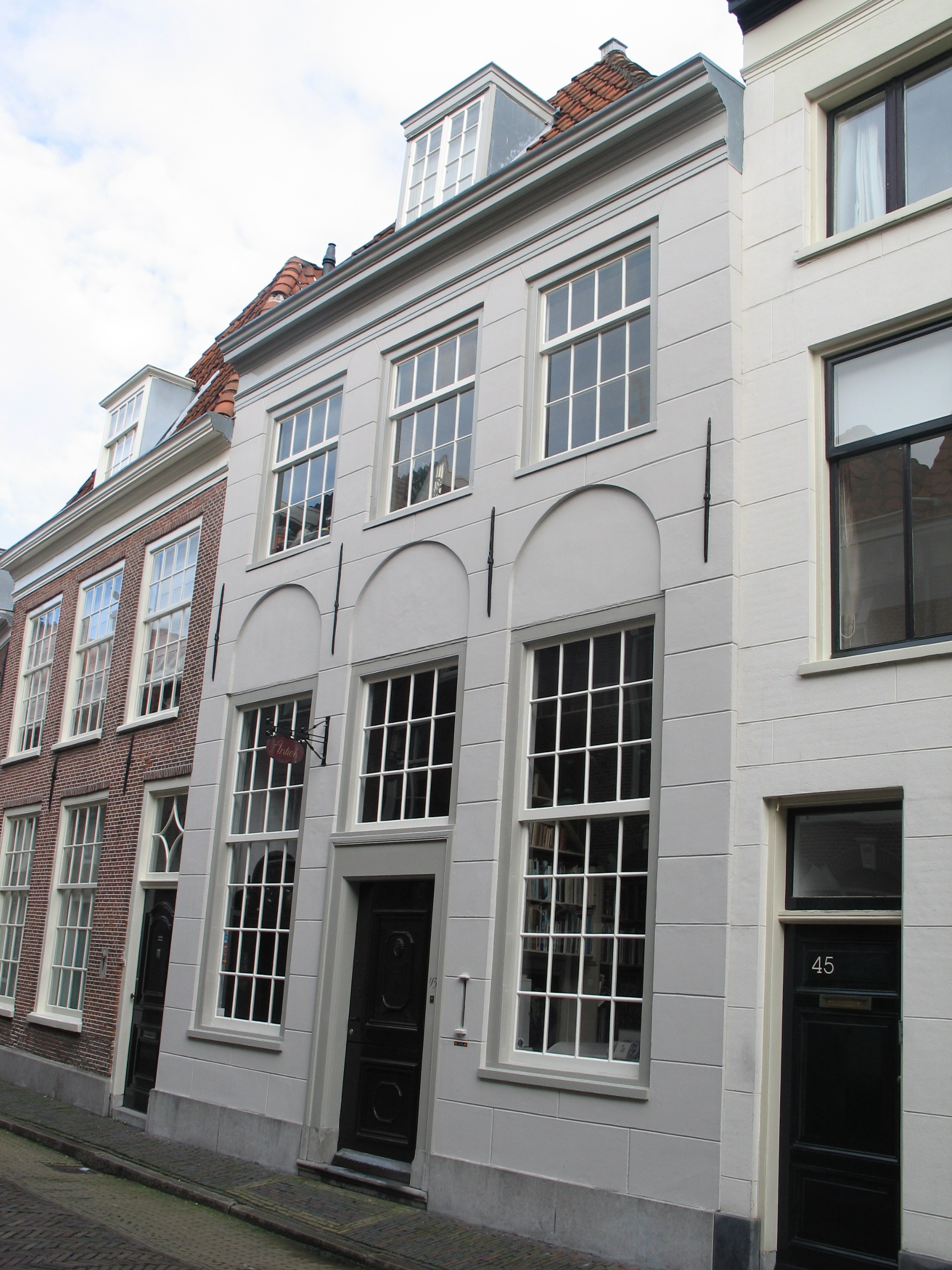
Klein Heiligland 43, former home and studio of the painter Henri Frédéric Boot, where he lived and worked for almost 60 years.

Henri Frédéric Boot (1877, Maastricht – 1963, Haarlem), was a Dutch painter and printmaker mostly active in Haarlem.

== Biography ==
According to the RKD he was a pupil of the painters Dirk Gerard Ezerman, Alexander Henri Robert van Maasdijk, Rein Miedema, Barent Johannes Cornelis Weingärtner in Breda, and Johan Hendrik Wijtkamp. He became a member of the Kunstkring Haarlem in 1905, the artist club De Onafhankelijken in 1912 (board member in 1917), Guild of St. Luke in Amsterdam in 1931, the Kennemerse Kunstenaarskring (K.K.K.) from 1932, and chairman of Kunst zij ons doel in 1939. Boot's work was included in the 1939 exhibition and sale Onze Kunst van Heden (Our Art of Today) at the Rijksmuseum in Amsterdam. He was a member of Arti et Amicitiae from 1943 to 1961.

Boot was infamous for being a member of the Nederlandse Kultuurkamer and member of the Kultuurraad during the German occupation 1941-1945.

He became a prolific painter and teacher and lived to a great age. He taught at the School voor Kunst en Kunstnijverheid in Haarlem. His students were Truida Baaren-Ruysenaars, Nel Bakema, Jan Bazuin, Maarten Bloemendaal, Maria C. Boas-Zélander, Ton de Boer, Jules Chapon, Poppe Damave, Mies Deinum, Dons Deppe, Henri Eernink, Gerard Esser, Gerrit Frederiks, Jan Habets, Jacob de Heer Kloots, Martinus Gerardus Hölscher, Otto B. de Kat, Ad Kikkert, Piet Kloes, Willem Kouwer Boomkens, Willem Jan Leffef, Henk van der (1913-1970) Linden, Benno Logtenberg, Maximiliaan Louis Maas, Janny Meijer, Truus Menger-Oversteegen, Jacob Möhlenpage, Heppe de Moor, Theo van Odyck, Andries Olthoff, Jan Harm Oostendorp, Cornelis Pijnacker Hordijk, Christiaan Pointl, Martin Ruijter, Jan Rusman, Josef Santen, Henk Schoorl, Leen Spierenburg, Wim Steijn, Joop Stoffels, Dick Stolwijk, Herman van Tongeren, René Pierre Tonneyck, Eduard Verboog, Margaretha C. Verheus, Frans Verpoorten, Kees Verwey, Gerritje Visser, Leendert de Vogel, Gerard de Voogd, Johanna Helena Vreede-Mulder, Willem Abraham de Wijn, J.H. Willemse, and Leo de Winter.
