= Jur P. van den Berg =

Dutch academic engineer

- Born: Groningen, Netherlands
- Citizenship: Dutch
- Education: Groningen; Utrecht
- Scientific career
- Fields: Computational geometry Industrial engineering
- Workplaces: Utah; Berkeley; North Carolina
- Doctoral advisor: Mark H. Overmars

Jur P. van den Berg (born 1981 in Groningen, Netherlands) was the Chief Technology Officer and co-founder of driverless trucking startup Ike, which was sold to Nuro in 2020. As of 2024, he is part of the leadership at autonomous truck developer Waabi. He has been an assistant professor at the University of Utah. He was formerly a post-doctoral researcher in the Department of Industrial Engineering and Operations Research at the University of California, Berkeley and in the Department of Computer Science at the University of North Carolina at Chapel Hill. He has published more than 40 works in computational chemistry, computational geometry, computer animation, industrial engineering, robotics, and virtual reality. He has also coauthored the reciprocal velocity obstacle library for multi-agent navigation.
