= Jan Hillebrand Wijsmuller =

Dutch painter (1855-1925)

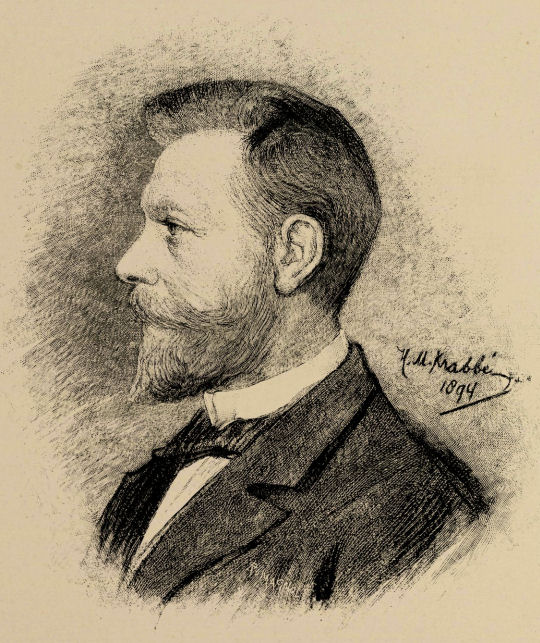
Portrait of Jan Hillebrand Wijsmuller by H. M. Krabbé in 1894.

Jan Hillebrand Wijsmuller (13 February 1855 in Amsterdam – 23 May 1925 in Amsterdam) was a Dutch painter. He belongs to The 2. Golden Age of Dutch Painting.

He is an impressionist of the School of Allebé, better known as Amsterdam Impressionism, part of the international movement of the Impressionism. From the art historical point of view he is one of the 2nd generation of the Hague School. He used the bright color palette of the French Impressionists, too – but from the perspective of a Dutchman.

== Life and work ==
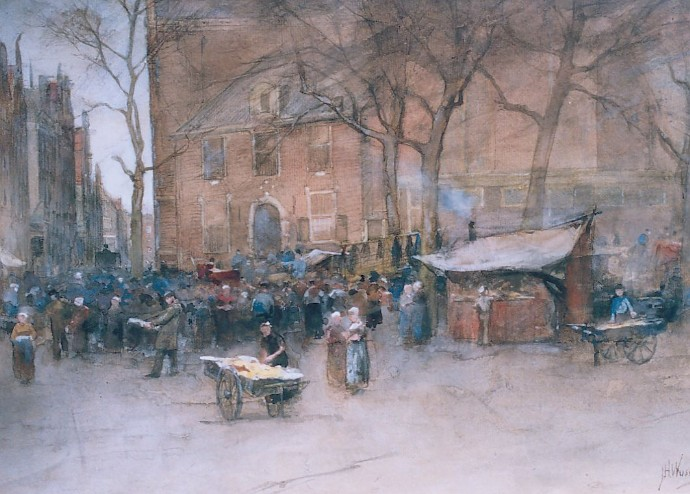
Market at the Noorderkerk (North Church), Amsterdam

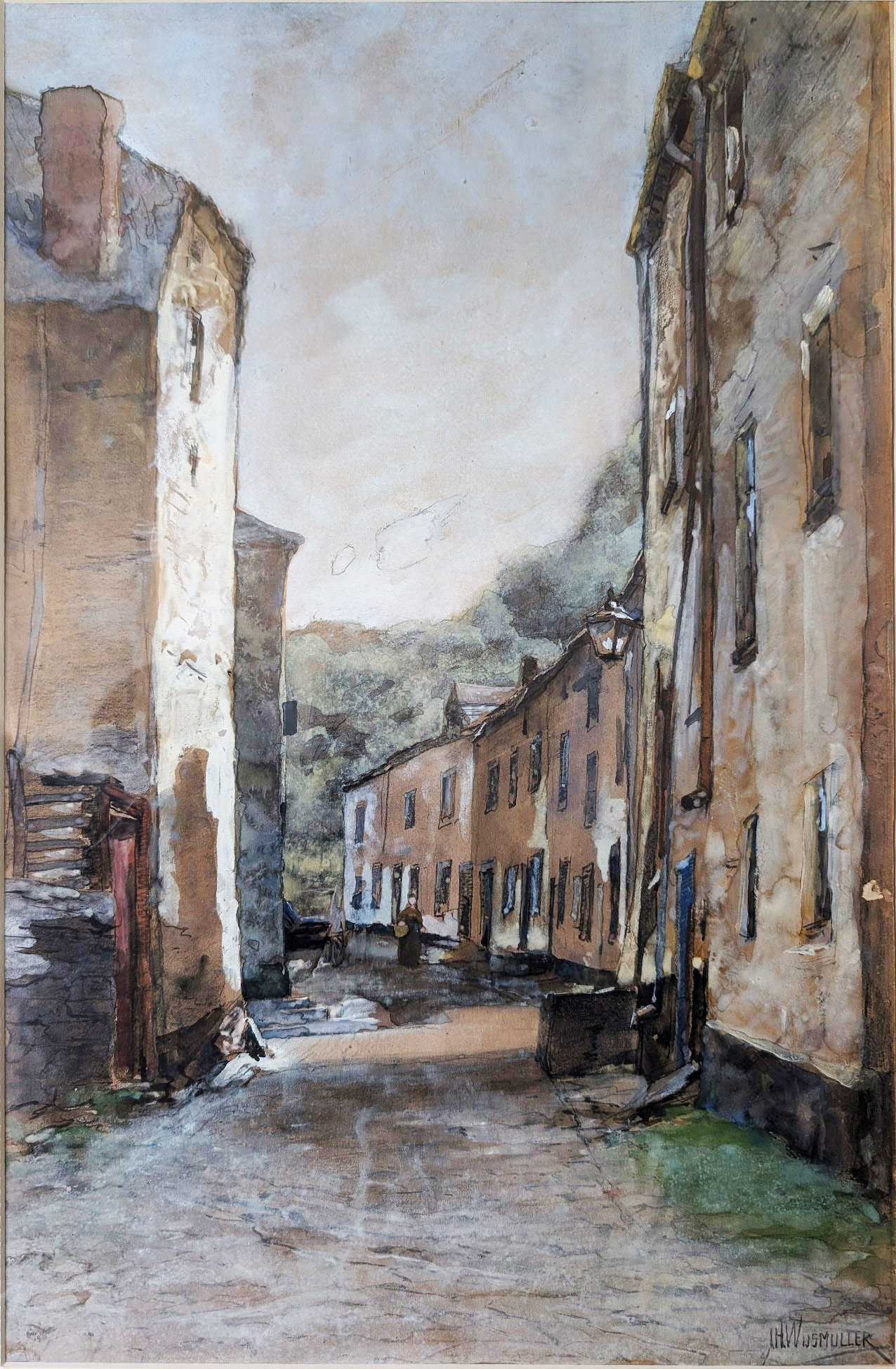
A lady in the Alley by JH Wijsmuller

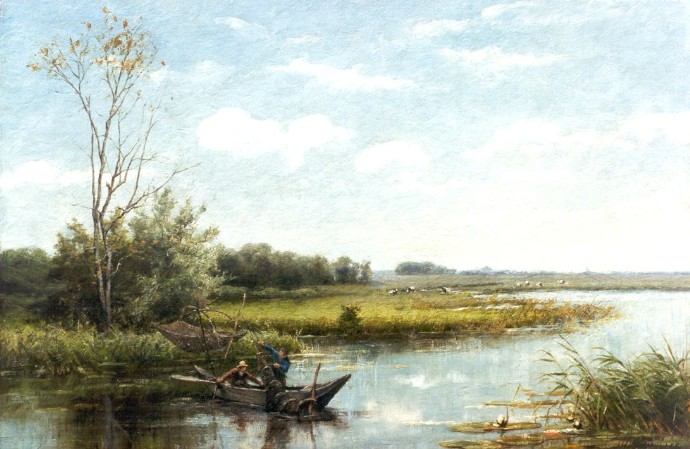
Review of the fishing traps

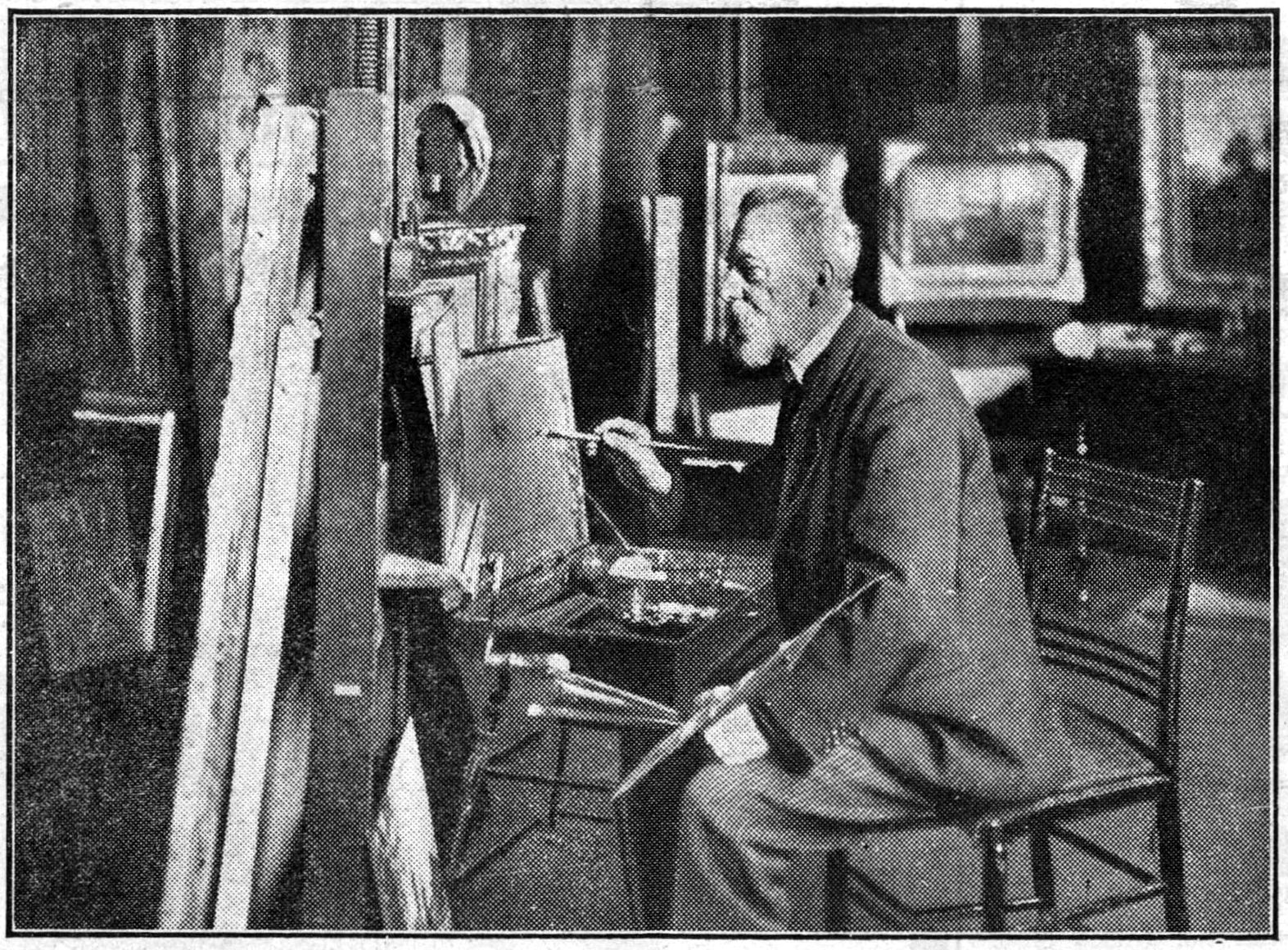
Jan Hillebrand Wijsmuller in his studio early 1925

From 1876 on Jan Hillebrand Wijsmuller began studying at the Royal Academy of Fine Arts in Amsterdam – better known as Rijksacademie. He had been one of the 179 students of Prof. Allebé – it was well known, that his lessons were based on the current flow of time. In 1877 followed his wandering years. They led him to the Akademie van beeldende Kunsten — Den Haag, the famous Académie royale des Beaux-Arts de Bruxelles and the Hague School in its heyday. – The latter brought forth such famous masters such as Johannes Bosboom, Paul Gabriël, the brothers Jacob Maris and Matthijs Maris, Anton Mauve and Jan Hendrik Weissenbruch. Here, Vincent van Gogh found his way into painting.

He won the Willink van Collenprijs for young artists by which he had been supported. This is awarded annually by the Amsterdam Academy Arti et Amicitiae. In 1883 he had won this award. The name of his work is no longer known.

With his own studio he settled in Amsterdam. His friends included the well known artists Ernst Witkamp, Nicolaas van der Waay and Carel Dake.

He belongs to the second generation of the Hague School. But he was a representative of the Amsterdam Impressionism, better known as School of Allebé, too.

In his creative works the former life of agile, thriving metropolis Amsterdam was immortalized. The opposite pole are landscape portraits. They include scenes canals, windmills and older landscapes with the day's work of fisherman. His repertoire is completed by the classic Dutch theme – the continuation of the tradition of the coastal landscape of the North Sea. He also made portraits of the people of The Hague and surroundings.

He was a representative of the realism and the plein air painting. In his paintings he combines the influences of the first period of the Hague School, the Barbizon School and the Impressionists.

In his paintings he cleverly uses his own visual language for the spatial extent and depth. His paintings live by the harmonious play of colors, sky, clouds, water and landscape. The lighting is living though the material interactions typical of the Netherlands seasons and climate.

From an art historical point of view he belongs to the Hague School, the School of Allebé, the Oosterbeek School, the Kortenhoef School and the Katwijk School. It must be seen as a Dutch art movement of that time of impressionism.

His works are characterized by their unique craft skills. His expressions were sketches on paper, and oil on wood and canvas.

He is buried at Zorgvlied cemetery.

== Exhibition ==
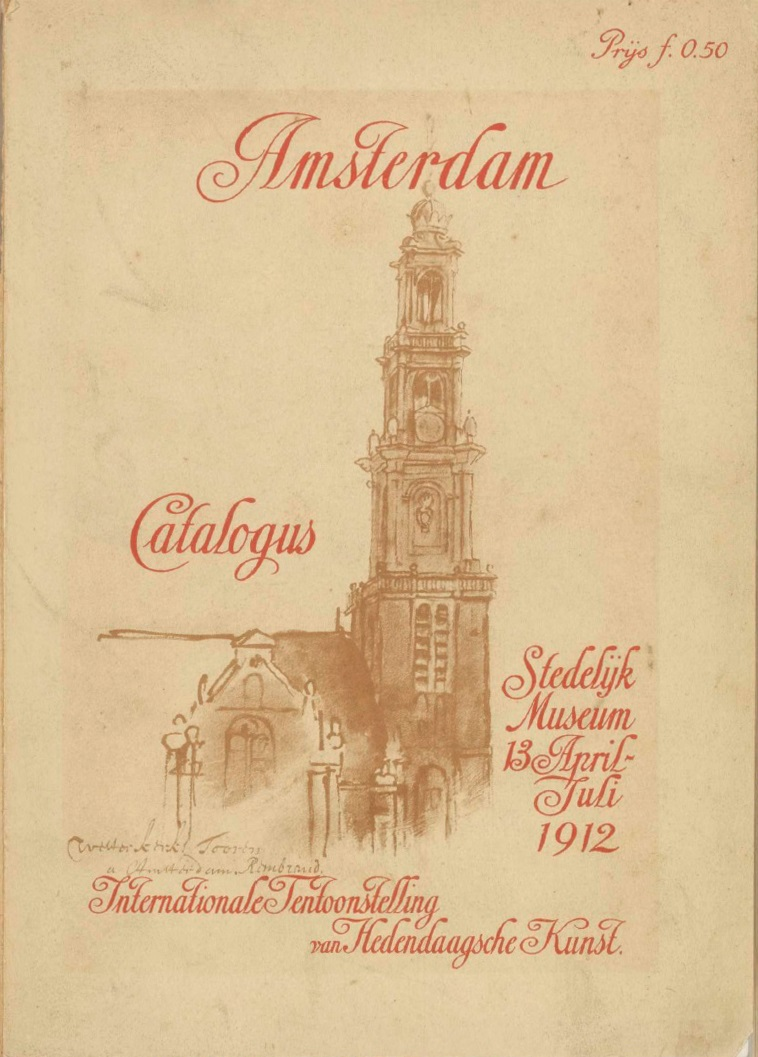
Cover of the catalogue of the exhibition from 1912: Stedelijke internationale tentoonstelling van kunstwerken van levende meesters, Stedelijk Museum, Amsterdam.

- 1903 Stedelijke internationale tentoonstelling van kunstwerken van levende meesters, Stedelijk Museum, Amsterdam.
- 1905 Collection of Arti et amicitiae and Pulchri Studio at Kunstverein in Hamburg
- 1907 Stedelijke internationale tentoonstelling van kunstwerken van levende meesters, Stedelijk Museum, Amsterdam.
- 1912 Stedelijke internationale tentoonstelling van kunstwerken van levende meesters, Stedelijk Museum, Amsterdam.

== In possession of large collections in the Netherlands a.s.f. ==
- Historisches Museum, Amsterdam
- Rijksmuseum, Amsterdam
- Stedelijk Museum, Amsterdam
- Museum Willet-Holthuysen, Amsterdam
- Dordrechts Museum, Dordrecht
- Dienst Verspreide Rijkskollecties, The Hague
- Gemeentemuseum Den Haag, The Hague
- The Mesdag Collection, The Hague
- Stadhuis, The Hague
- Goois Museum, Hilversum
- Zeeuws Museum, Middelburg
- St. Vrienden Museum Noordwijk, Noordwijk
- Belasting museum, Rotterdam
- Art Dealer Simonis & Buunk, Ede

== A selection of pictures as a cross-section of his work ==
- Old-Amsterdam
- Market near the Noorderkerk, Amsterdam
- A view of Kolk, Amsterdam
- Old canal of Utrecht with view at the Dom
- A town square
- A view on a town canal by night
- A Lady in an Alley
- Draw—bridge in winter landscape
- Windmills in winter
- Sawing mills
- Windmills in a polder landscape
- A farm along a River
- The forest at Oosterbeek
- In the dunes looking out to sea, Noordwijk aan Zee
- A street scene, Katwijk
- The church at Kortenhoef
- Landscape, Blaricum
- Pulling in the nets
- Waterlilies
- A river landscape
- Trees in a field
- Ducks in a forest fen
- Cows at pasture
- Wife with a pitch
- Flowers in a vase
- A summer's day at the beach
- Bomschuiten on the beach, Egmond aan Zee
- A shell fisher on the beach

== Selected bibliography ==
=== Books ===
- De Bodt, Saskia and Sellink, Manfred. Nineteenth Century Dutch Watercolors and Drawings, Museum Boijmans Van Beuningen, Rotterdam, 1998.
- Carole Denninger-Schreuder: De onvergankelijke kijk op Kortenhoef : een schilderdorp in beeld, uitgeverij Thoth Bussum, 1998, ISBN 90-6868-215-6, page 42 – 45.
- De Leeuw, Ronald et al. The Hague School Dutch Masters of the 19th Century (1983)
- Sillevis, John, Dutch Drawings From the Age of Van Gogh, Taft Museum, Cincinnati, Ohio, 1992.
- John Sillevis: Katwijk in de schilderkunst, Katwijk Museum, Katwijk, 1995, ISBN 90-800304-4-9.
- Sillevis, John and Tabak, Anne, The Hague School Book, Waanders Uitgegevers, Zwolle, 2004.
- Suyver, Renske. A Reflection of Holland: The Best of the Hague School in the Rijksmuseum (2011)
- Wright, Christopher (1980): Paintings in Dutch Museums, Philip Wilson Publishers Ltd., London, ISBN 0 85667 077 4

=== Publications ===
- B. Bakker et al.: De verzameling Van Eeghen, Amsterdamsche tekeningen 1600–1950, Zwolle /Amsterdam 1988, p. 438
- C.L. Dake: Aanteekeningen over beeldende kunst, Utrecht 1915, p. 75–76.
- H.M. Krabbé: J.H.Wijsmuller, Elsevier's Geïllustreerd Maandschrift 4 (1894), p. 233–247 en idem in: M.Rooses [red.], Het Schildersboek, [...], Dl 4, Amsterdam 1900, p. 179–195.
- J. Versteegh: Verandering tot die richting beteekent voor mij :zelfmoord – De kentering in de eerste tien jaren van Elsevier's Geïllustreerd Maandschrift, De Boekenwereld 20 (2003–2004), p. 151.

=== RDK – Netherlands ===
- Jonkman/Geudeker 2010, p. 52, 53
- Marius 1920, p. 229
- Scheen 1969–1970
- Scheen 1981, p. 597, afb.nr. 807 (als: Wijsmuller, Jan Hillebrand)
- Stolwijk 1998, p. 332
- Witt Checklist 1978
