= August Allebé =

Dutch artist and teacher

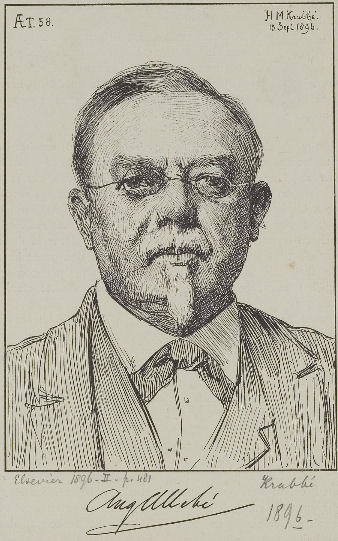
Portrait by Hendrik Maarten Krabbé (1896)

August Allebé was an artist and teacher from the Northern Netherlands. His early paintings were in a romantic style, but in his later work he was an exponent of realism and impressionism. He was a major initiator and promoter of Amsterdam Impressionism, the artist's association St. Lucas, and the movement of the Amsterdamse Joffers. Amsterdam Impressionism – sometimes referred to by art historians as the School of Allebé – was the counterflow to the very strong Hague School in the movement of Dutch Impressionism. As a professor at the Royal Academy of Amsterdam (Rijksakademie van beeldende kunsten) he fostered a cosmopolitan attitude toward art and the promotion and motivation of his students, and provided a significant stimulus to developments in modern art.

== Biography ==
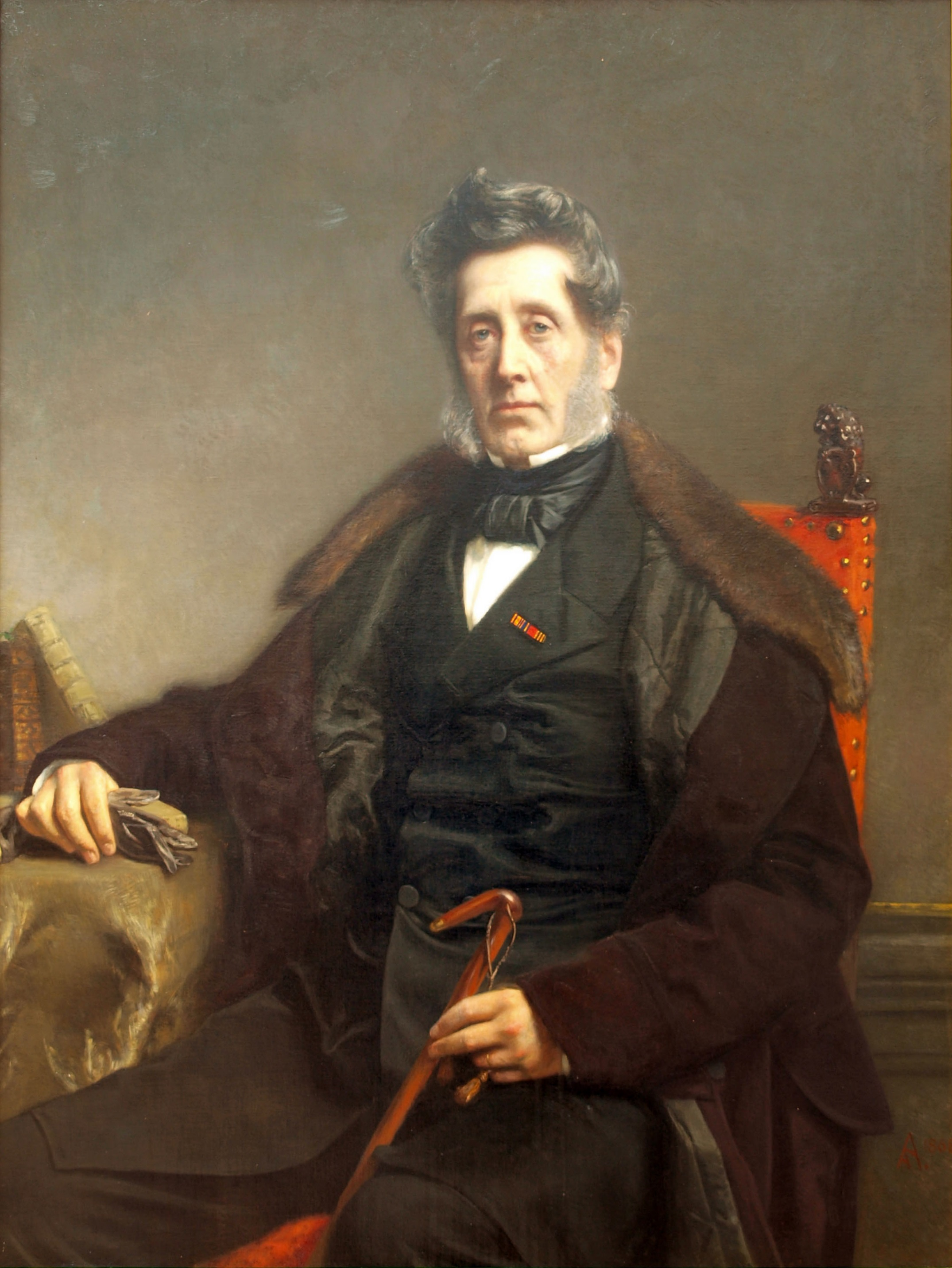
Portrait by Allebé of Johannes Luden, 1868, collection Teylers Museum

He was born in Amsterdam. According to the RKD he followed evening classes at Felix Meritis and studied at the Antwerp Academy, the Rijksakademie van beeldende kunsten, and the École des Beaux-Arts in Paris. He was a pupil of Petrus Franciscus Greive, Adolphe Mouilleron, Charles Rochussen and Louis Royer. He became a member of Arti et Amicitiae in Amsterdam from 1863 and a member of Société Royale Belge des Aquarellistes from 1868. In 1870 he became a professor at the Royal Academy of Amsterdam (Rijksakademie van beeldende kunsten) and was a director there from 1880. The RKD lists 179 pupils and it is known that he stayed in correspondence with ex-pupils and several artists came back to the academy to be able to follow classes with him.

He was a strong influence on the Amsterdamse Joffers, and had close ties with Amsterdam Impressionism.

He died in Amsterdam in 1927 and is buried at Zorgvlied cemetery.

A square is named after him in the neighborhood of streets named after 19th- and 20th-century Dutch painters in Overtoomse Veld-Noord, Amsterdam.

== Kunstenaarsvereniging Sint Lucas ==
In 1880, the Kunstenaarsvereniging Sint Lucas, an artist's association in Amsterdam, was founded with his support. They became part of the Amsterdam art scene, and community center of artists and lovers of painting. Here contacts were made, passed on knowledge and thus the antithesis of successful structured Hague School, which was part of the international movement of impressionism. In addition, links to Amsterdam Soziëteit Arti et Amicitiae were present, which were essential for both institutions.

== Some of his well-known students ==
- Lizzy Ansingh (1875–1959)
- Floris Arntzenius (1864–1925)
- Johan Braakensiek (1858–1940)
- Nicolaas Bastert (1854–1939)
- Johanna Bauer-Stumpff (1873–1964)
- Tjeerd Bottema (1884–1978)
- Johan Coenraad Braakensiek (1858–1940)
- Cornelius de Bruin (1870–1940)
- Georg Hendrik Breitner (1857–1923)
- Antoon Derkinderen (1859–1925)
- Eduard Frankfort (1864–1920)
- Leo Gestel (1881–1941)
- Arnold Marc Gorter (1866–1933)
- Marie Heineken (1844–1930)
- Richard Roland Holst (1884–1956)
- Isaac Israëls (1865–1934)
- Cornelius Jetses (1873–1955)
- Hendrik Maarten Krabbé (1868–1931)
- Jacobus van Looy (1855–1930)
- Kees Maks (1876–1967)
- Herman Mees (1880–1964)
- Wally Moes (1856–1918)
- Pieter Cornelius Mondriaan (1872–1944)
- Martin Monnickendam (1874–1943)
- Gerard Muller (1861–1929)
- Jacoba Johanna Ritsema (1876–1961)
- Suse Robertson(1855–1922)
- Jan Slyters (1881–1957)
- Hobbe Smith (1862–1942)
- Dirk Smorenberg (1883–1960)
- Willem Bastiaan Tholen (1860–1931)
- Jan Tiele (1884–1956)
- Johannes Theodorus Toorop (1858–1928)
- Maurits van der Valk (1857–1935)
- Jan Pieter Veth (1864–1925)
- Gerhard Westermann (1880–1971)
- Petrus Theodorus van Wijngaerdt (1873–1964)
- Jan Hillebrand Wijsmuller (1855–1925)
- Ernst Witkamp (1854–1897)
- Willem Jan Willemsen (1866-1914)
- Jacques Witjens (1881-1956)
- Willem Witsen (1860–1923)
- Jan Zoetelief Tromp (1872–1947)

== Successful students of Allebé ==
- Lizzy Ansingh – she won the Barend Polviet and the Willink van Collenprijs in 1906.
- Pieter Florentius Nicolaas Jacobus Arntzenius – he got a commendation from the Willink van Collenprijs in 1890.
- Eduard Frankfort – he got the Gold medal from the Sociëteit Arti et Amicitae.
- Hendrik Maarten Krabbé – he got a commendation by the Willink van Collenprijs in 1889.
- Wally Moes - she won the 1. place of the Willink van Collenprijs in 1884.
- Henri Goovaerts – he won the Prix de Rome in 1890.
- Gerard Muller - he won the 1. place of the Willink van Collenprijs in 1887.
- Hobbe Smith - he won the 2. place of the Willink van Collenprijs in 1888.
- Willem Bastiaan Tholen - he won the 2. place of the Willink van Collenprijs in 1883 and in 1903 he got from the Queen Königin the Gold Medal of honor.
- Jan Hillebrand Wijsmuller – won the 1. Platz of the Willink van Collenprijs in 1883.
- Ernst Witkamp – he won the 1. place of the Willink van Collenprijs in 1882.
- Willem Witsen - he won the 2. place of the Willink van Collenprijs in 1885.

== Gallery of the important students ==
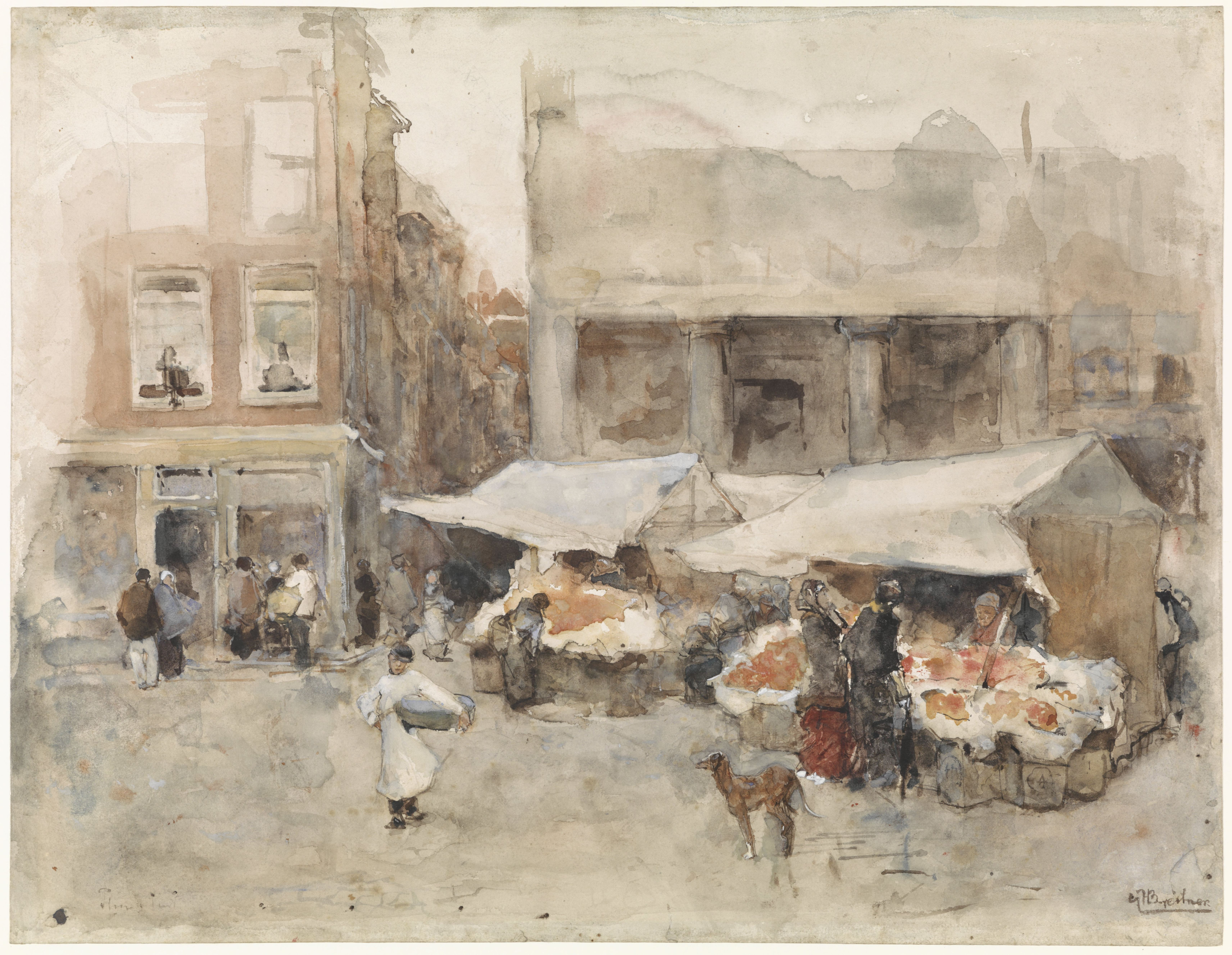
Floris Arntzenius (1874/1925): Market with flower stalls, Rijksmuseum Amsterdam

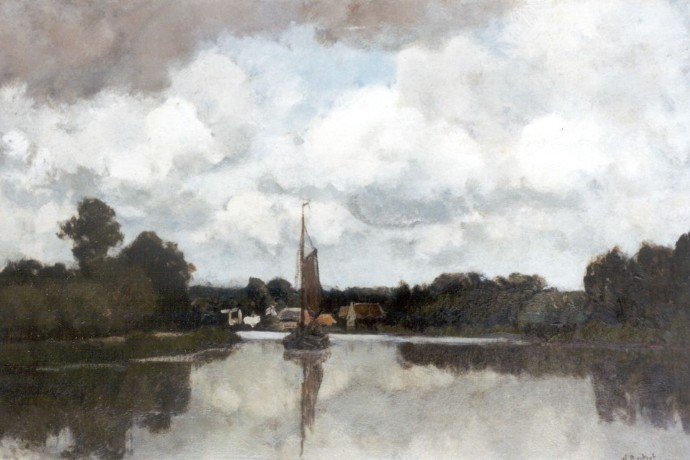
Nicolaas Bastert (1890): Vechtlandschap

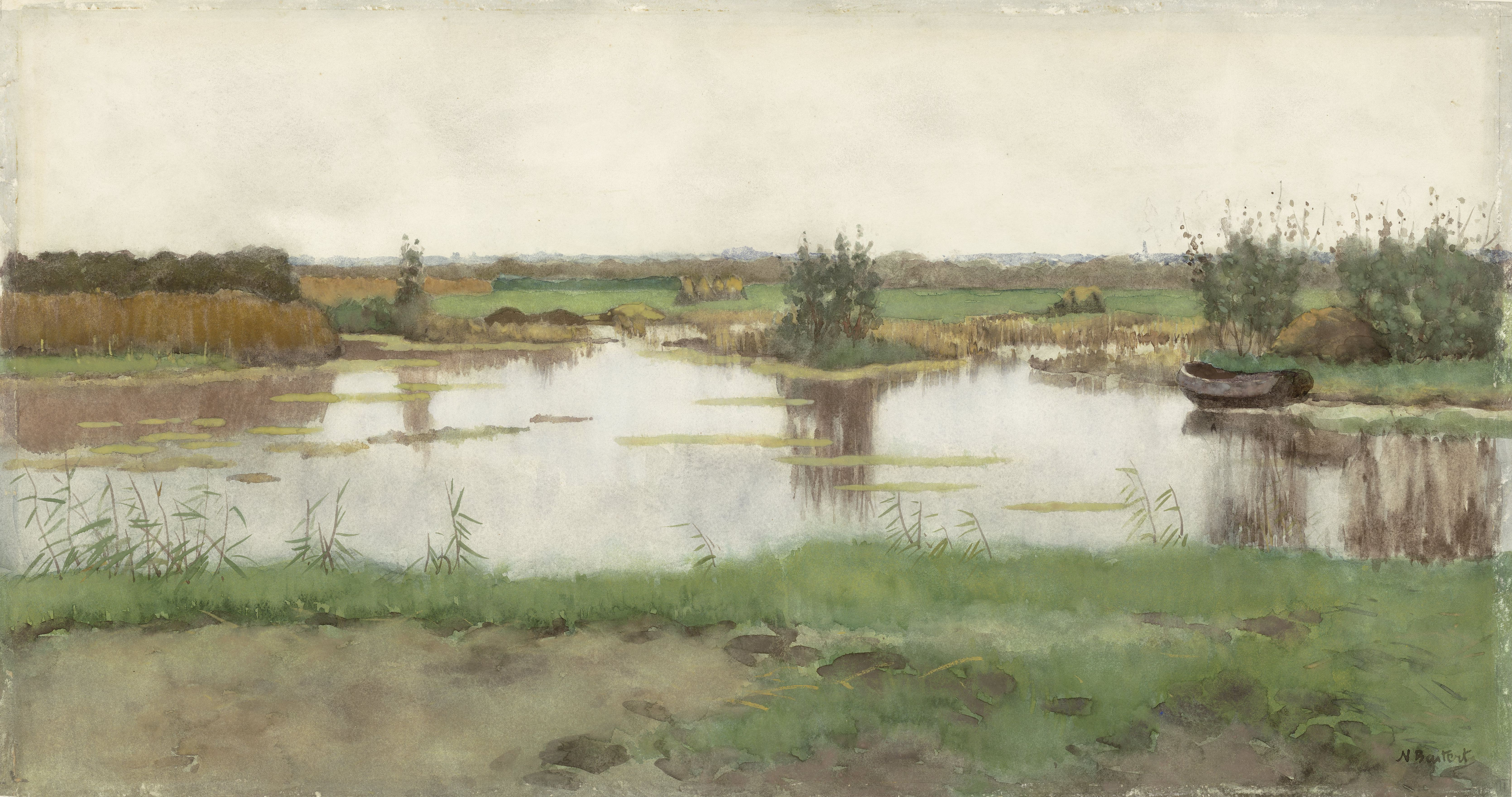
Nicolaas Bastert (1890/1919): Een waterplas in een weiland, Rijksmuseum Amsterdam

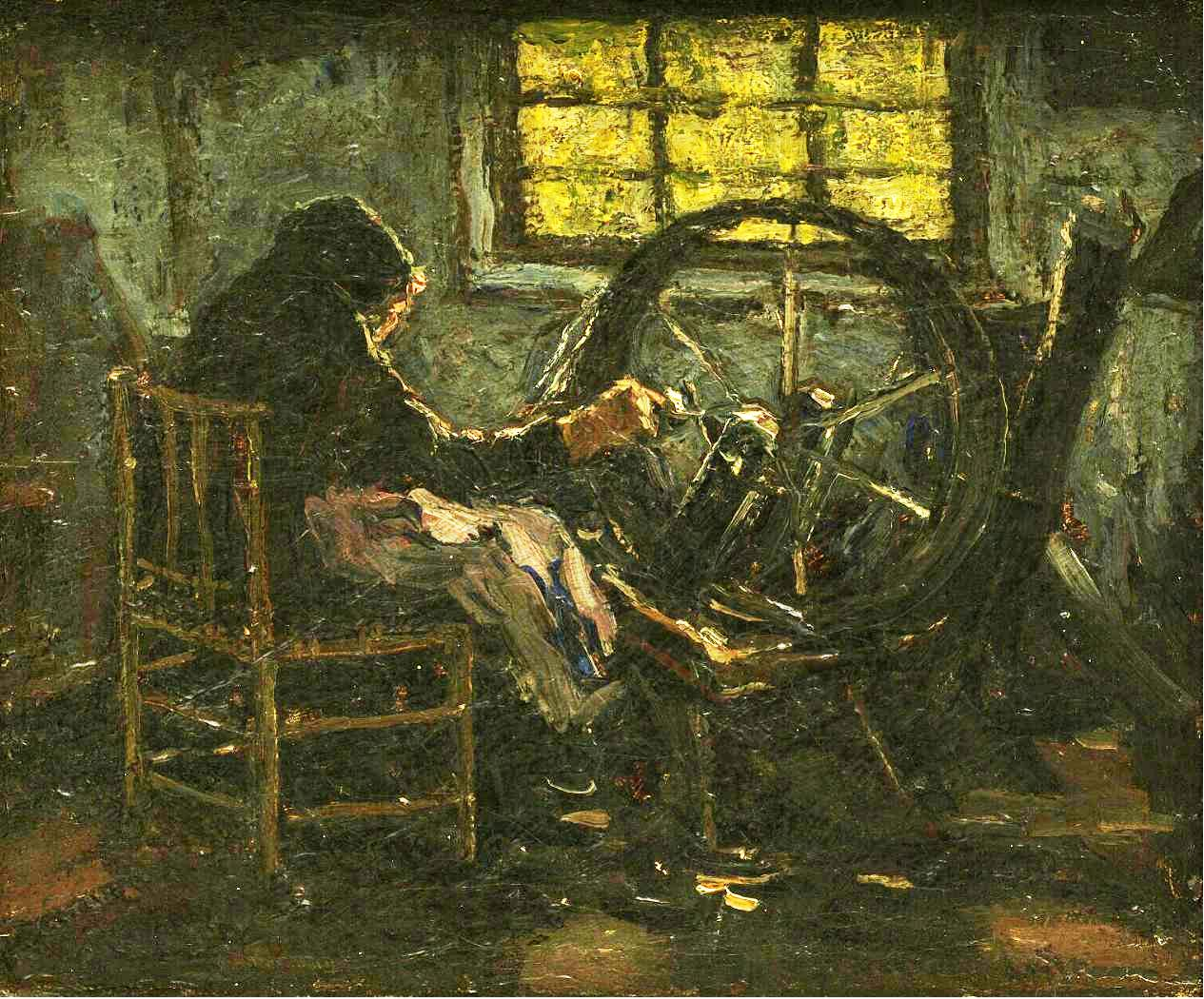
Suze Robertson (1900): Woman spinning, Gemeentemuseum Helmond

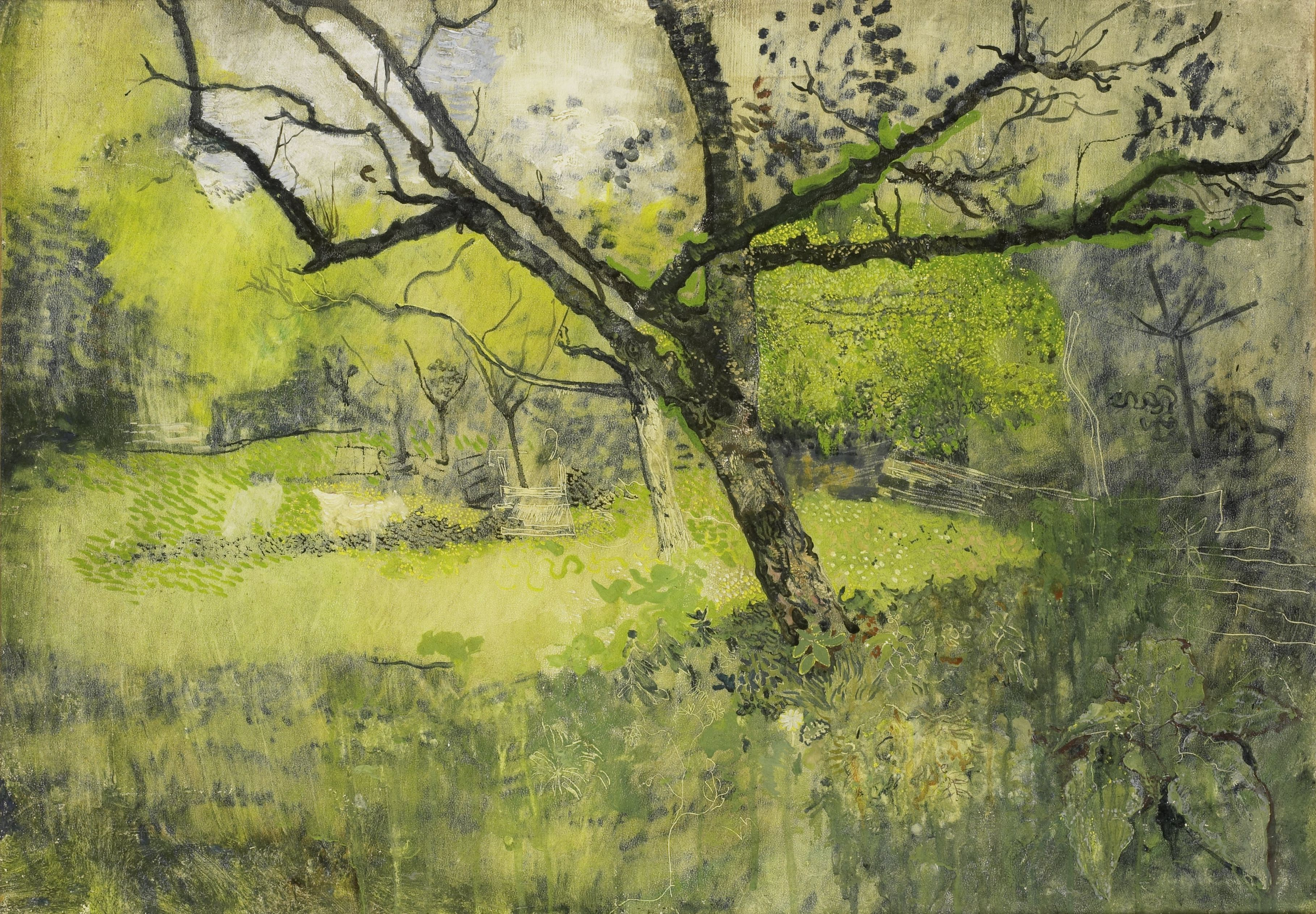
Richard Roland Holst (1888/1895): Boomgaard te Eemnes, Rijksmuseum Amsterdam

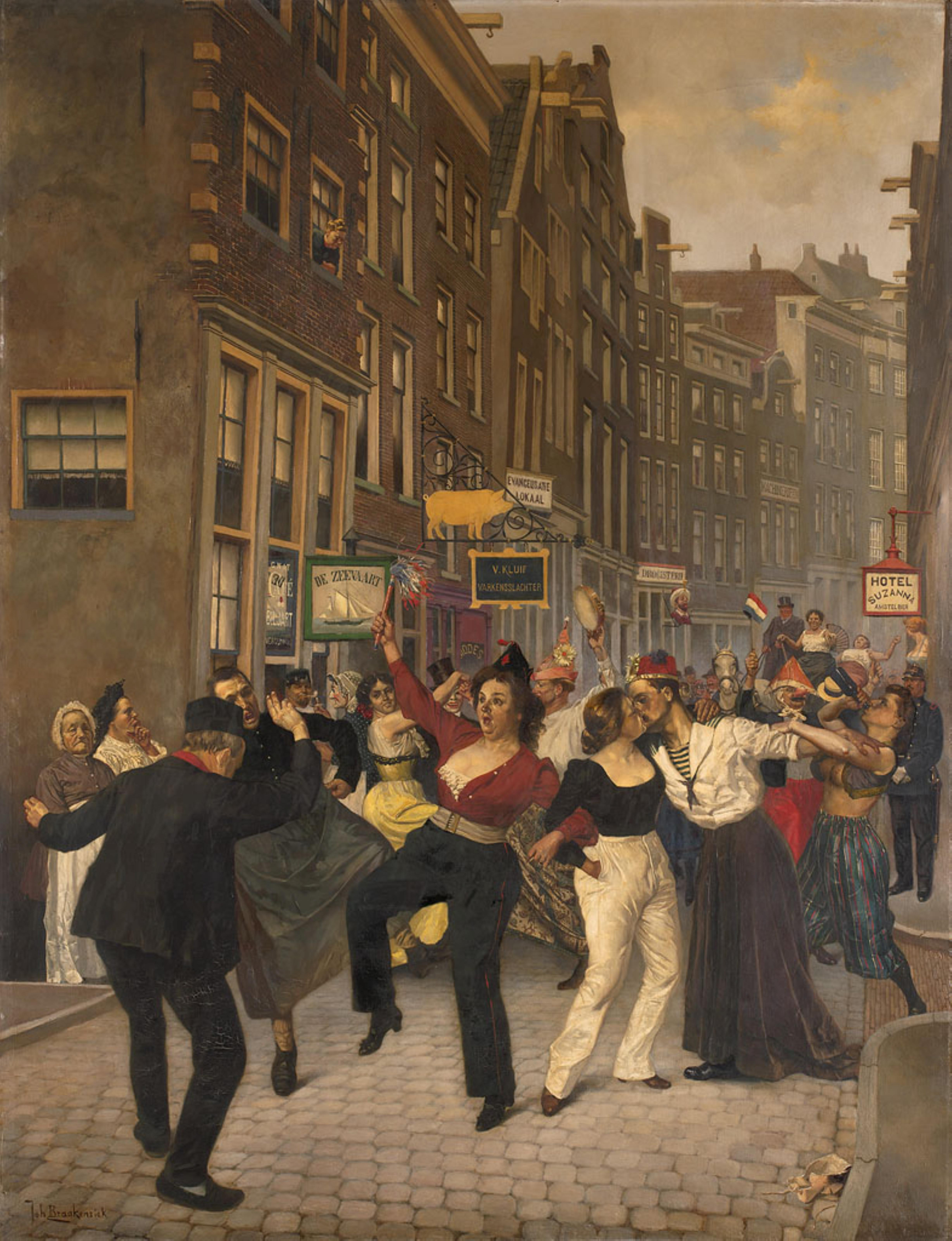
Johan Coenraad Braakensiek (1926): Hartjesdag, Amsterdam Museum

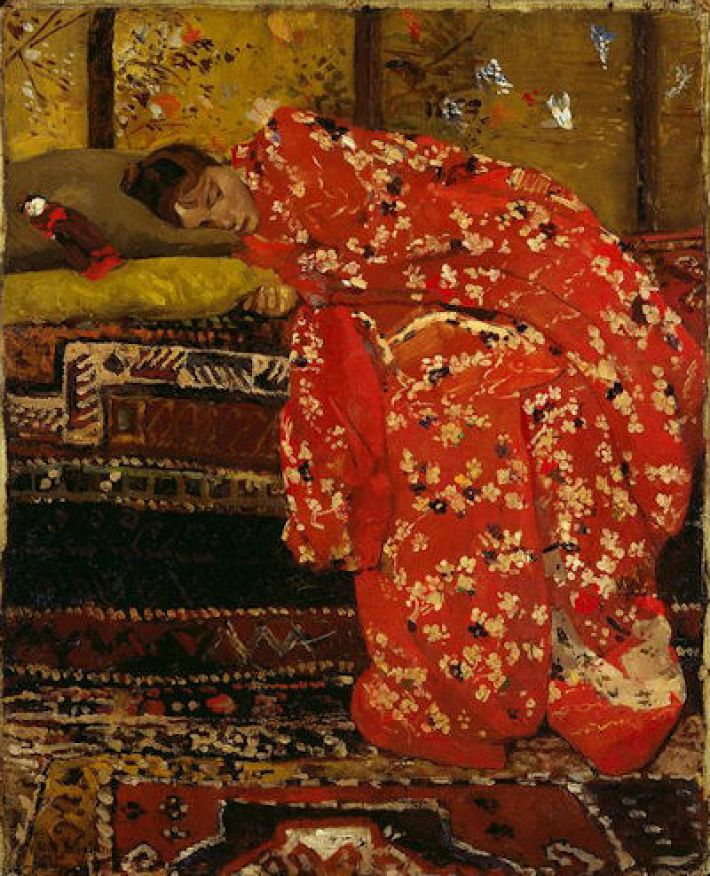
George Hendrik Breitner (1893/1895): Girl in a Red Kimono

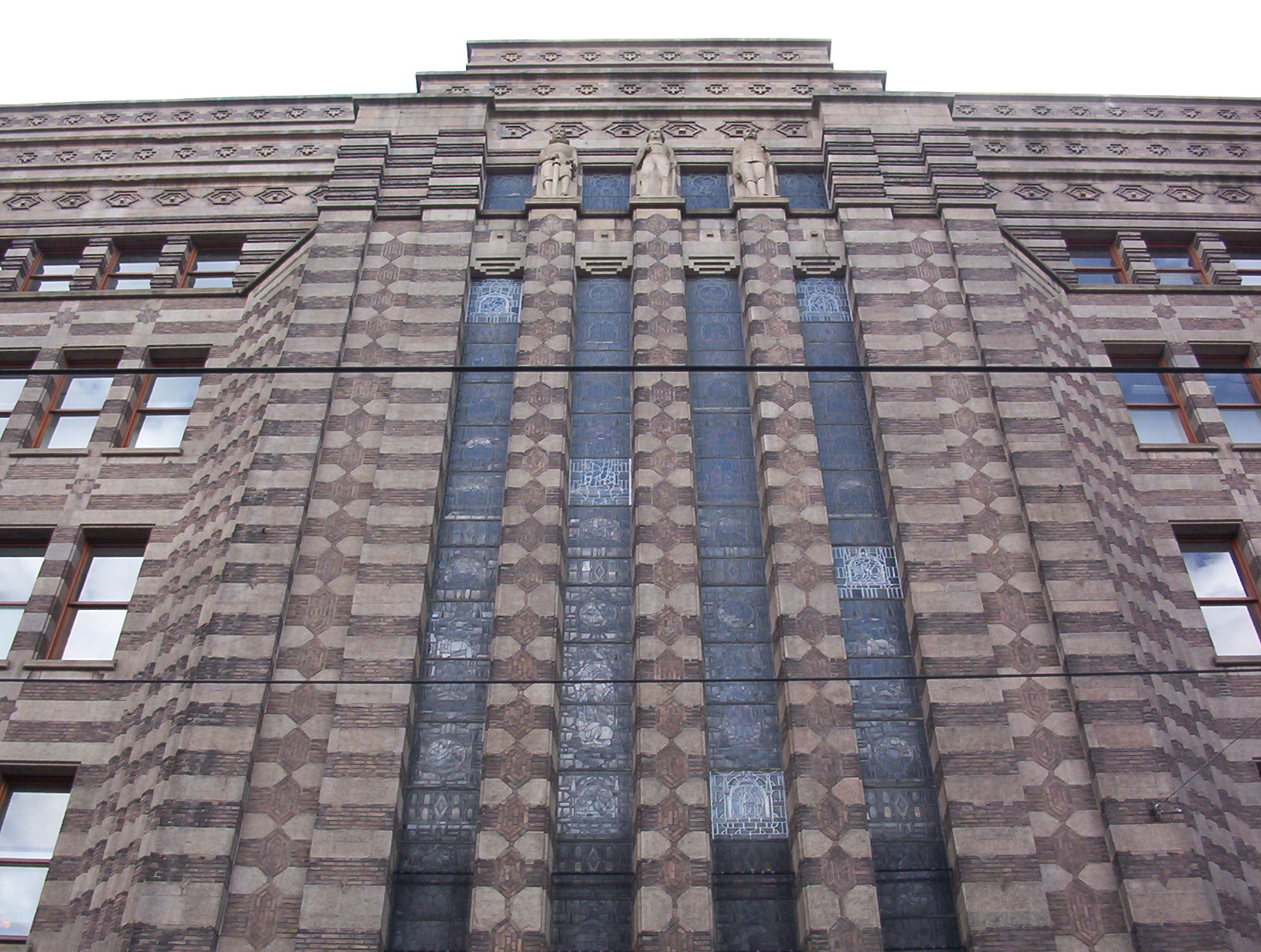
Antoon Derkinderen: De Bazel, Vijzelstraat, Amsterdam

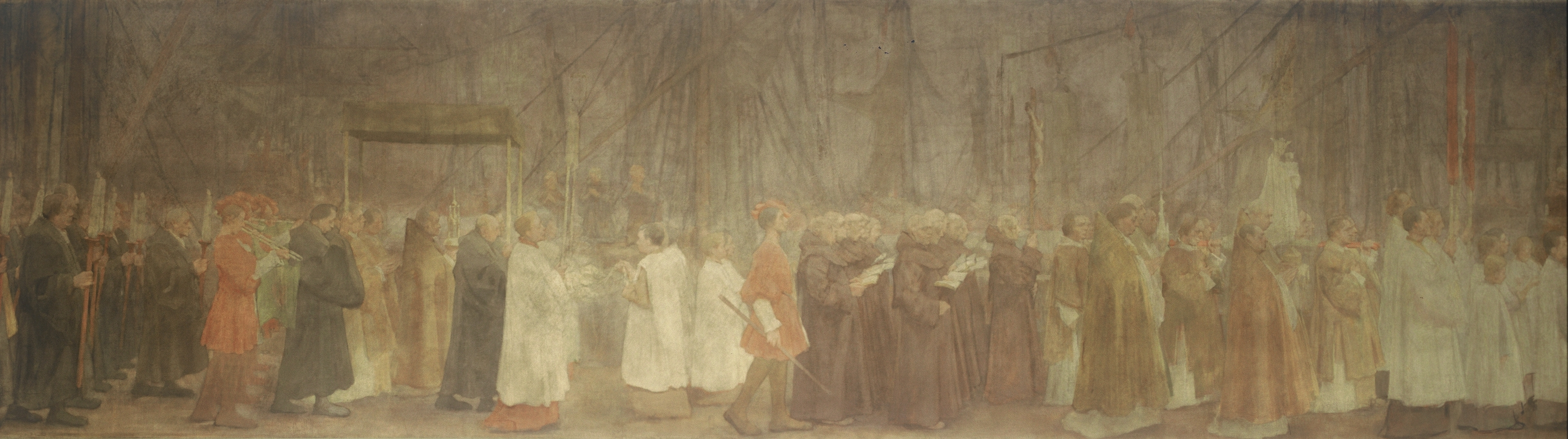
Antoon Derkinderen (1889): Processie van het H. Sacrament van Miracel, Amsterdamse Begijnhofkapel

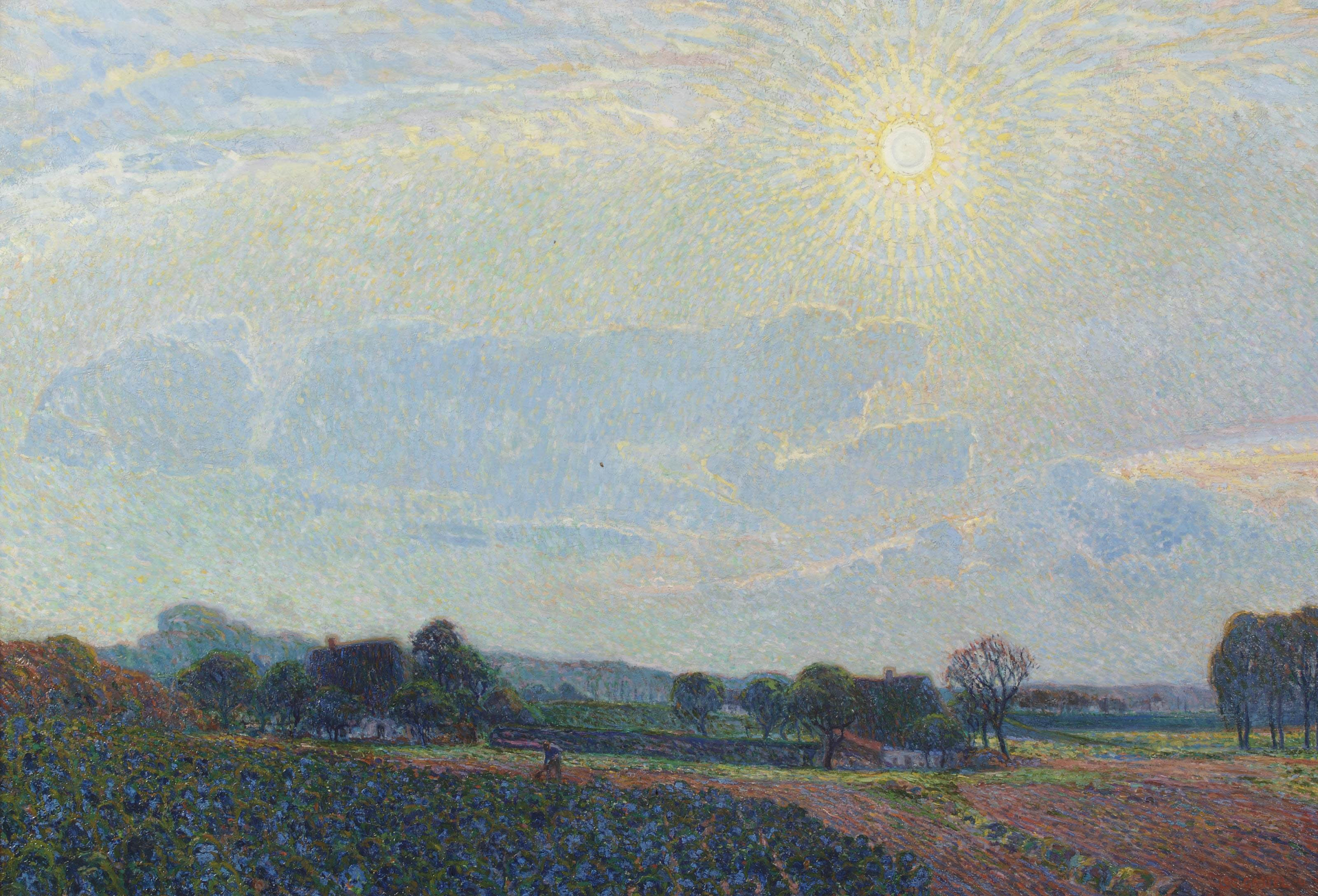
Leo Gestel (1910): A sunny morning

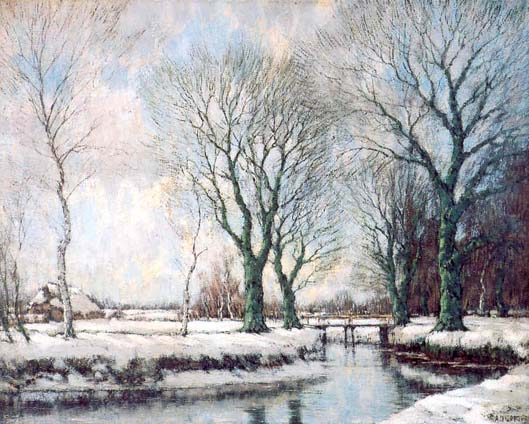
Arnold Marc Gorter (1900): Vordense Beek in de winter

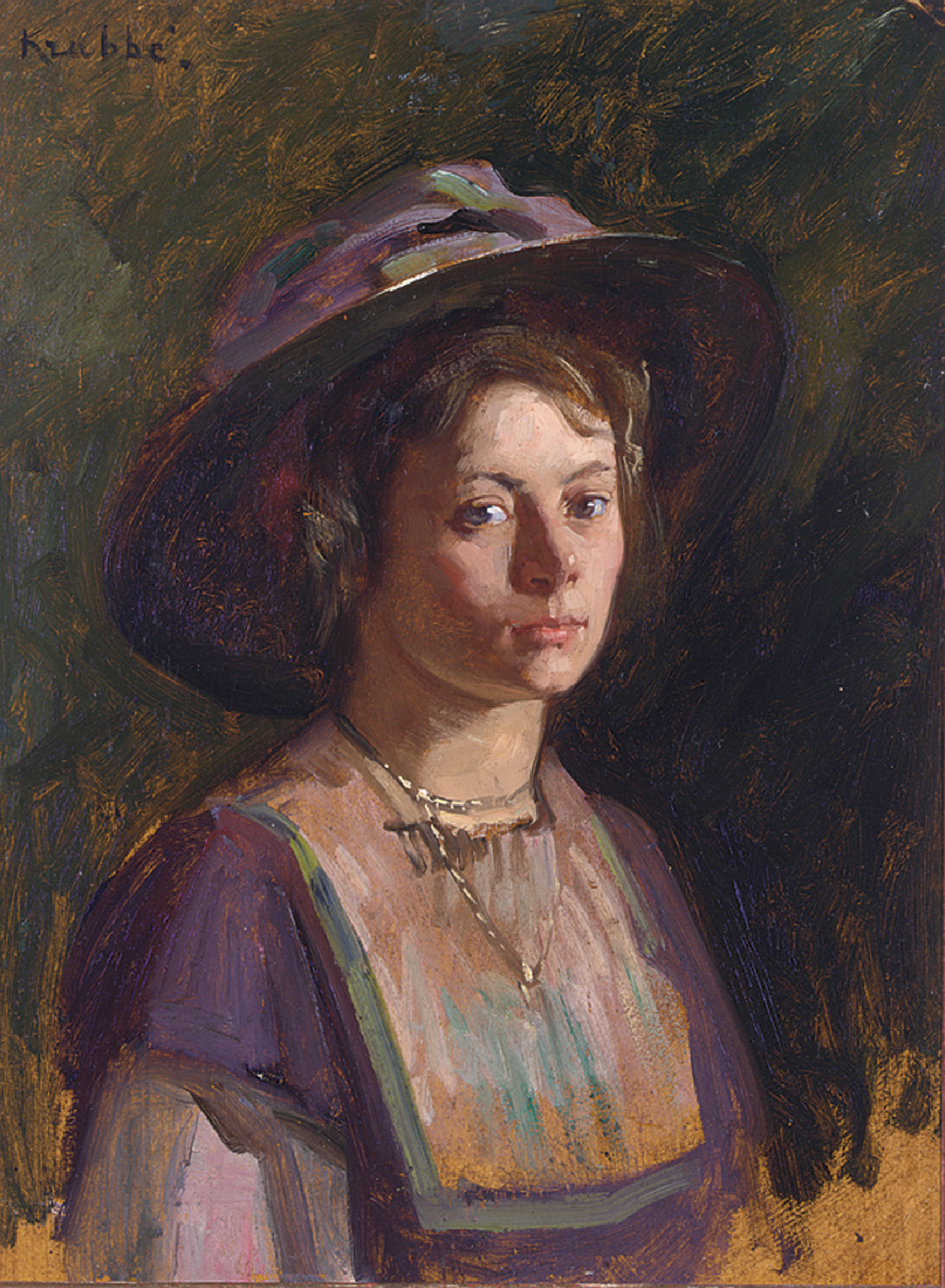
Hendrik Maarten Krabbé (1900): Young lady

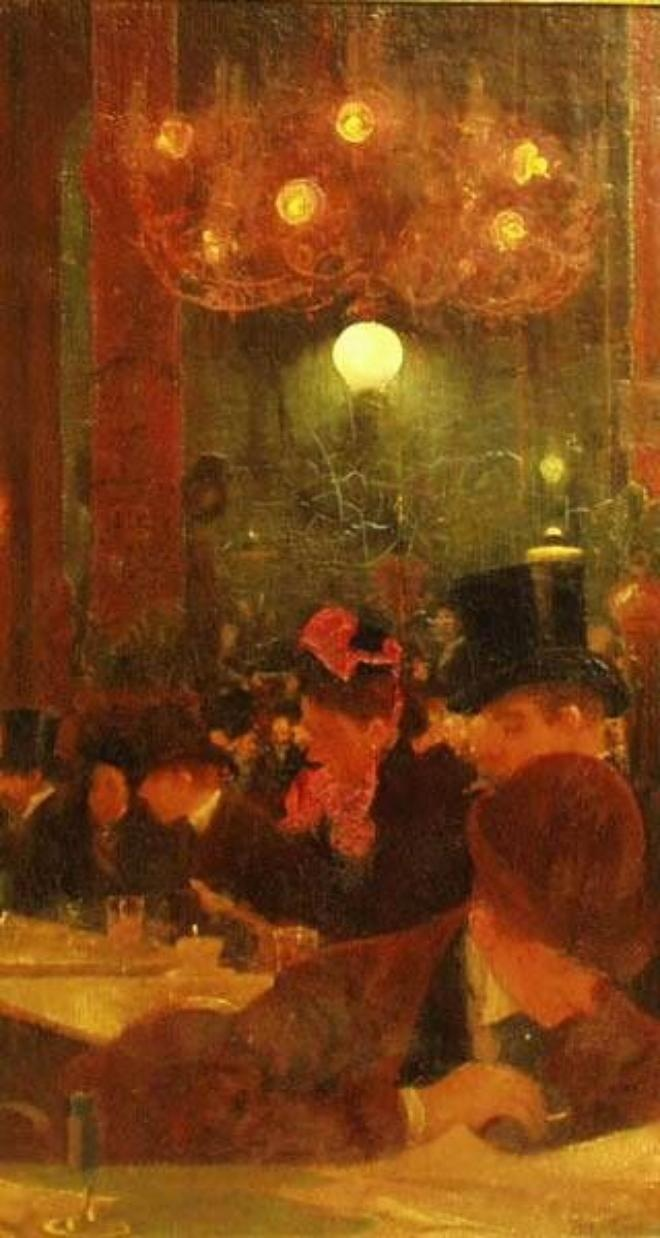
Jacobus van Looy (1890/1895): Café, Franz-Hals-Museum

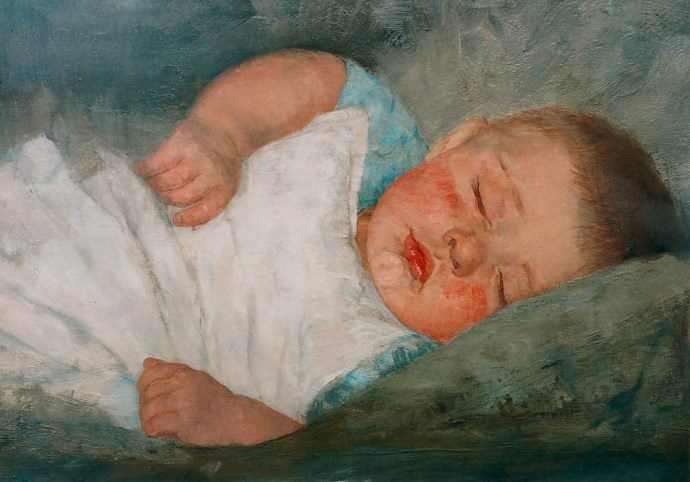
Wally Moes (1900): Sleeping baby

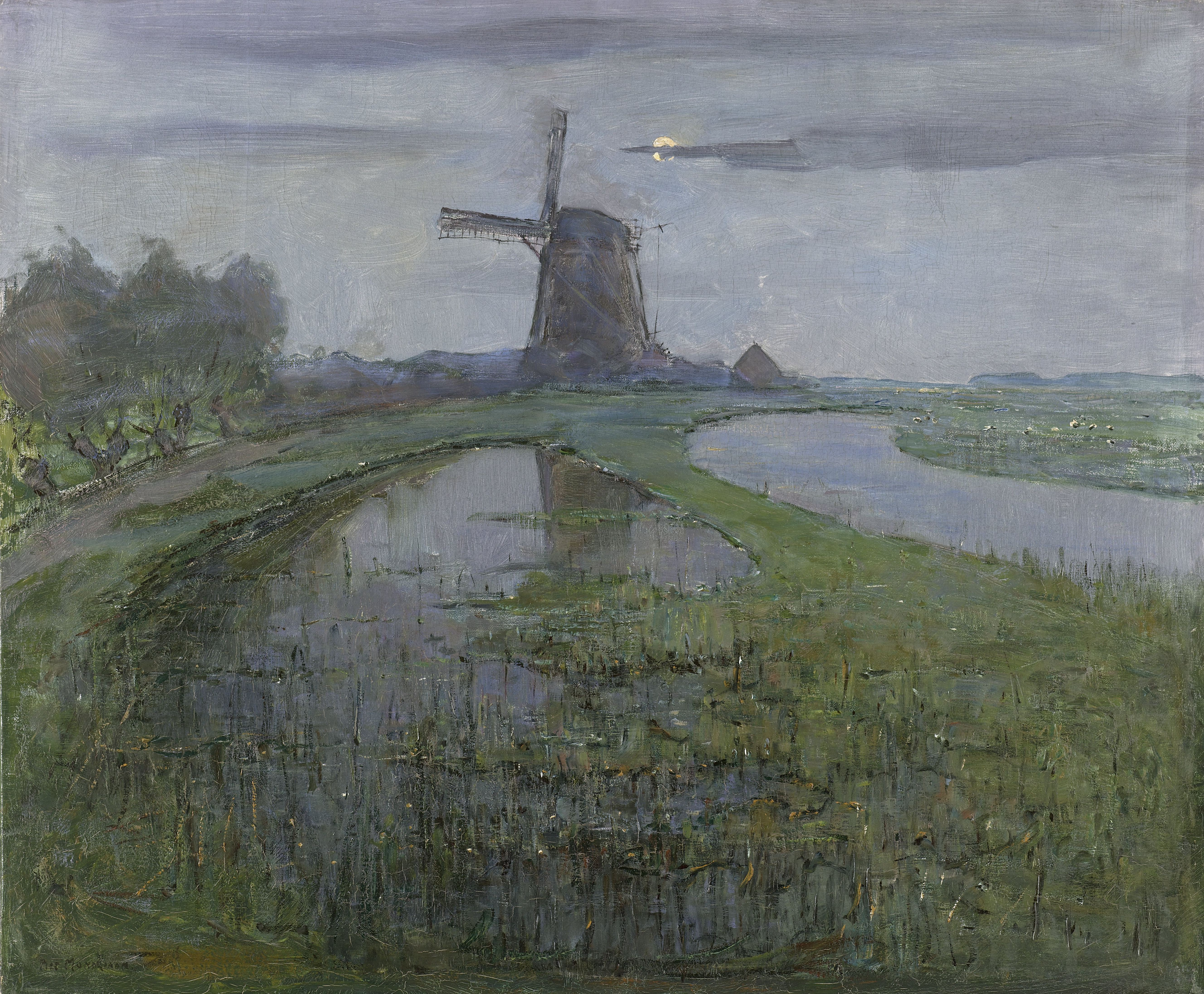
Piet Mondrian (1903): Oostzijdse Mill along the River Gein by Moonlight, Rijksmuseum Amsterdam

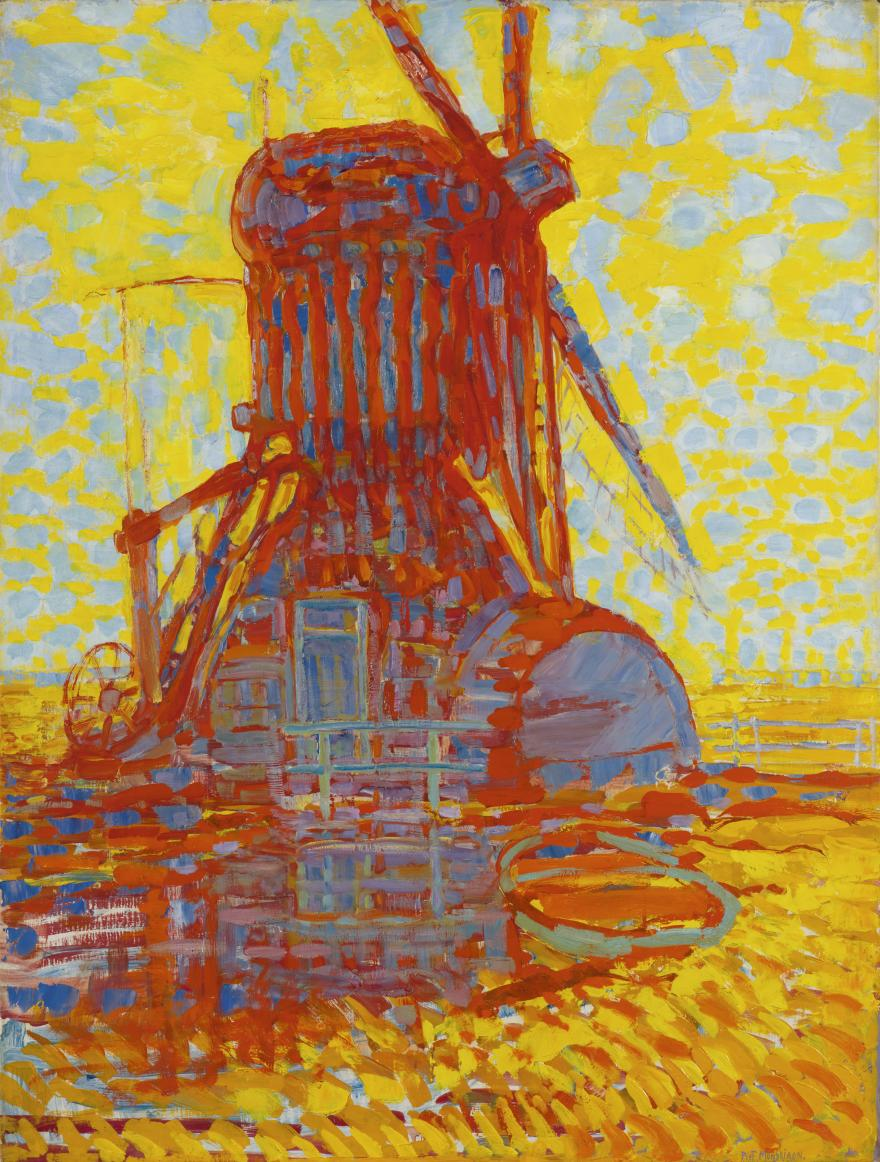
Piet Mondriaan (1908): Mill in Sunlight, Gemeentemuseum The Hague

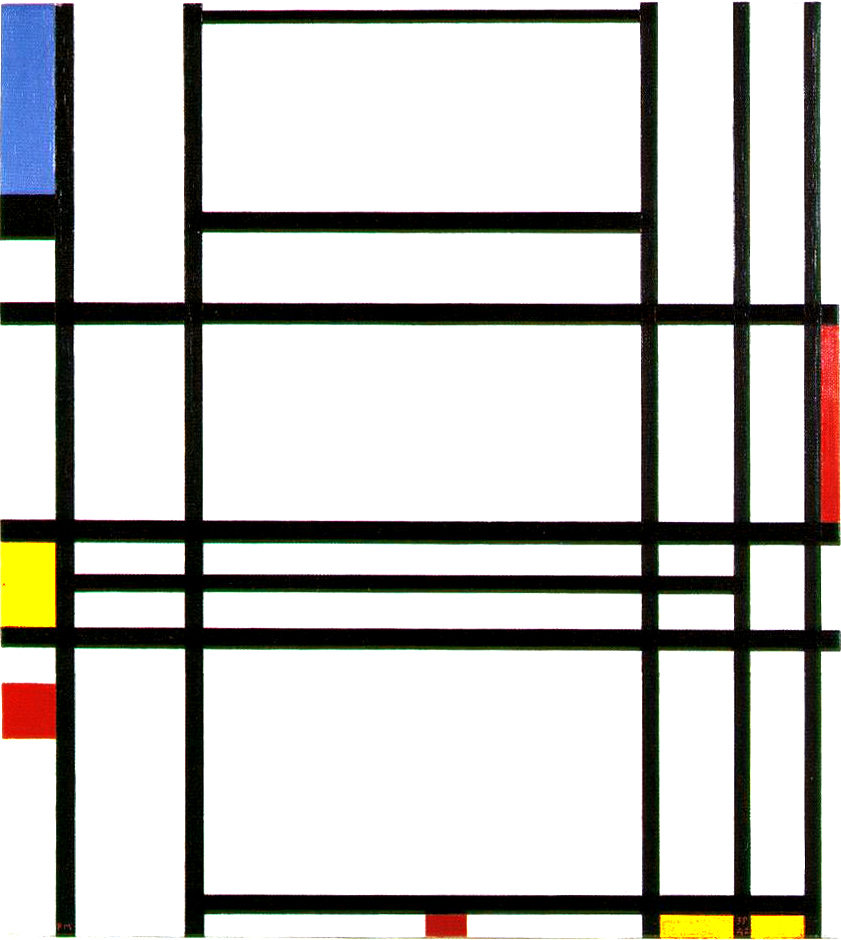
Piet Mondriaan (1939/1942): Composition 10

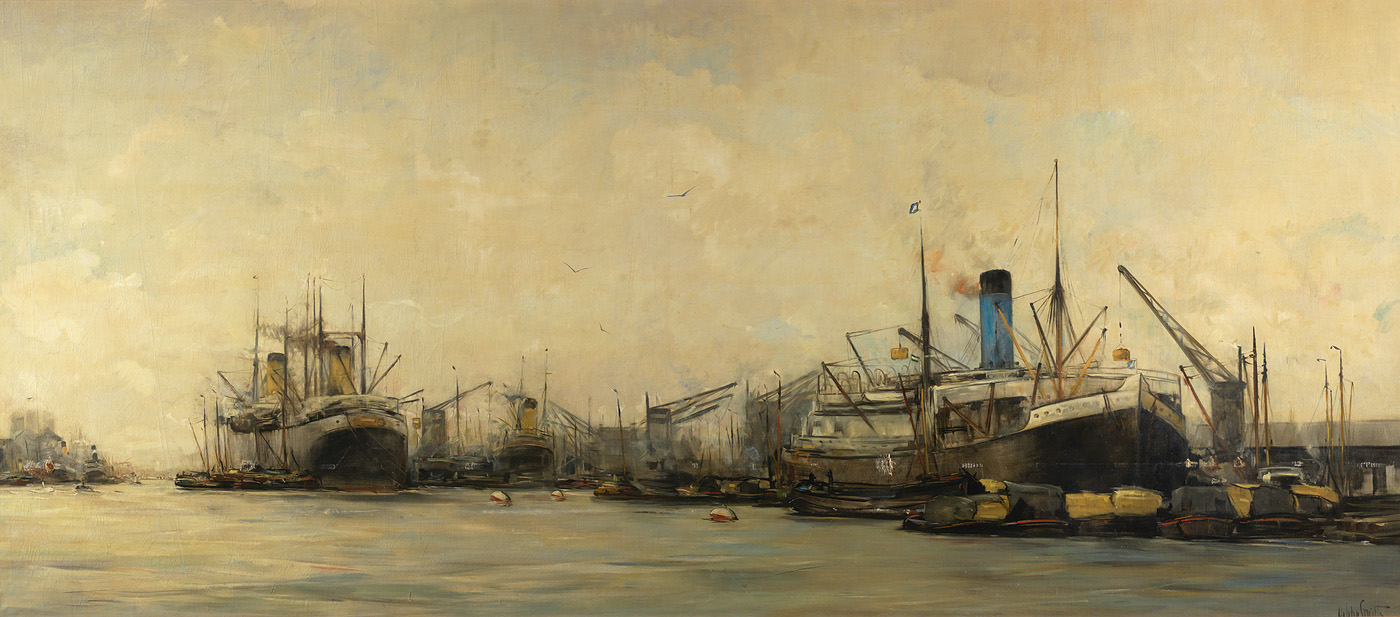
Hobbe Smith (1913): Gezicht op de IJhaven en de Javakade naar het westen, met een "blauwpijper" van de Nederlandsche Stoomvaart Maatschappij Oceaan-Havengezicht het IJ ten zuiden v-d Handelskade, Amsterdam Museum.

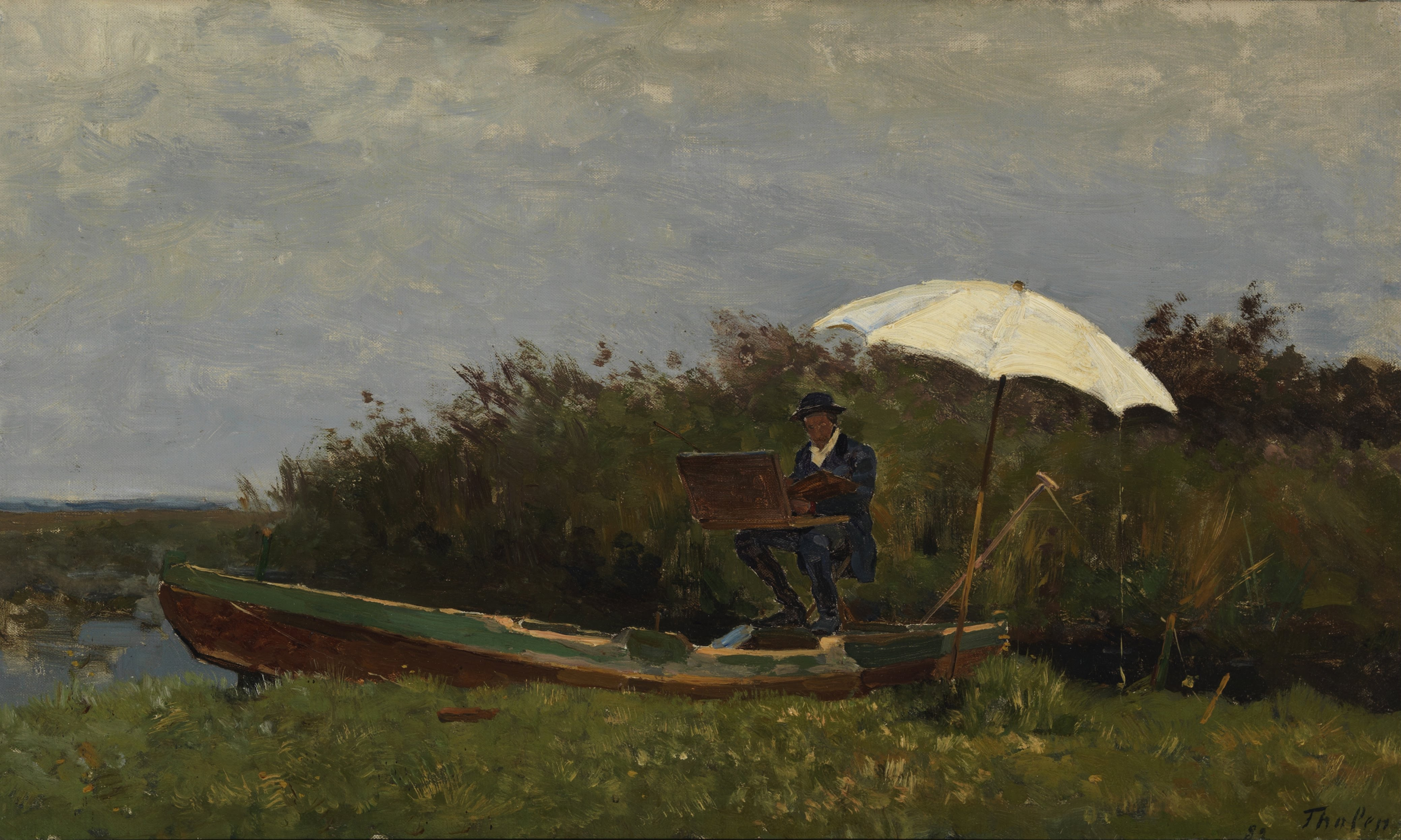
Willem Bastiaan Tholen (1882): De schilder Gabriël aan het werk in de vrije natuur, Museum Boijmans van Beuningen, Rotterdam

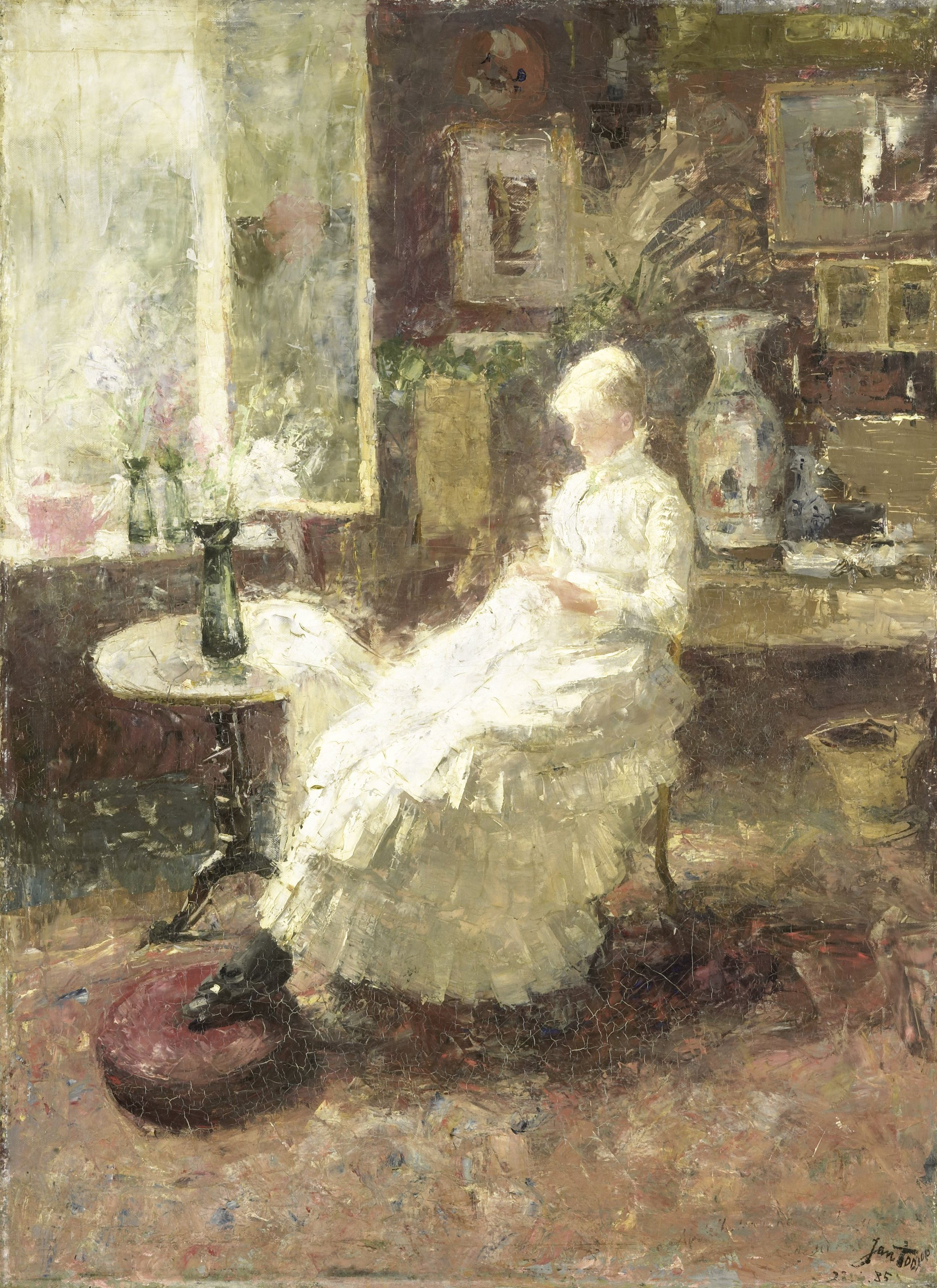
Johannes Theodorus Toorop (1885): Annie Hall in Lissadell, Stedelijk Museum Amsterdam

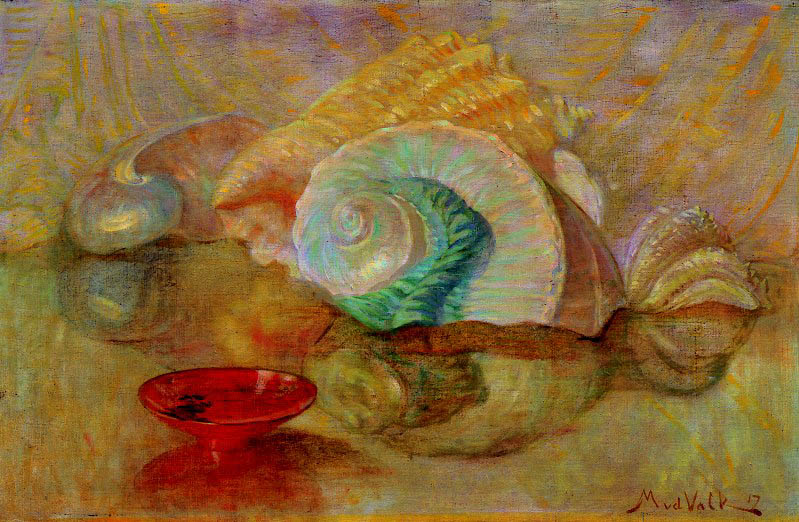
Maurits van der Valk (1917): Stilleven met schelp en schaaltje

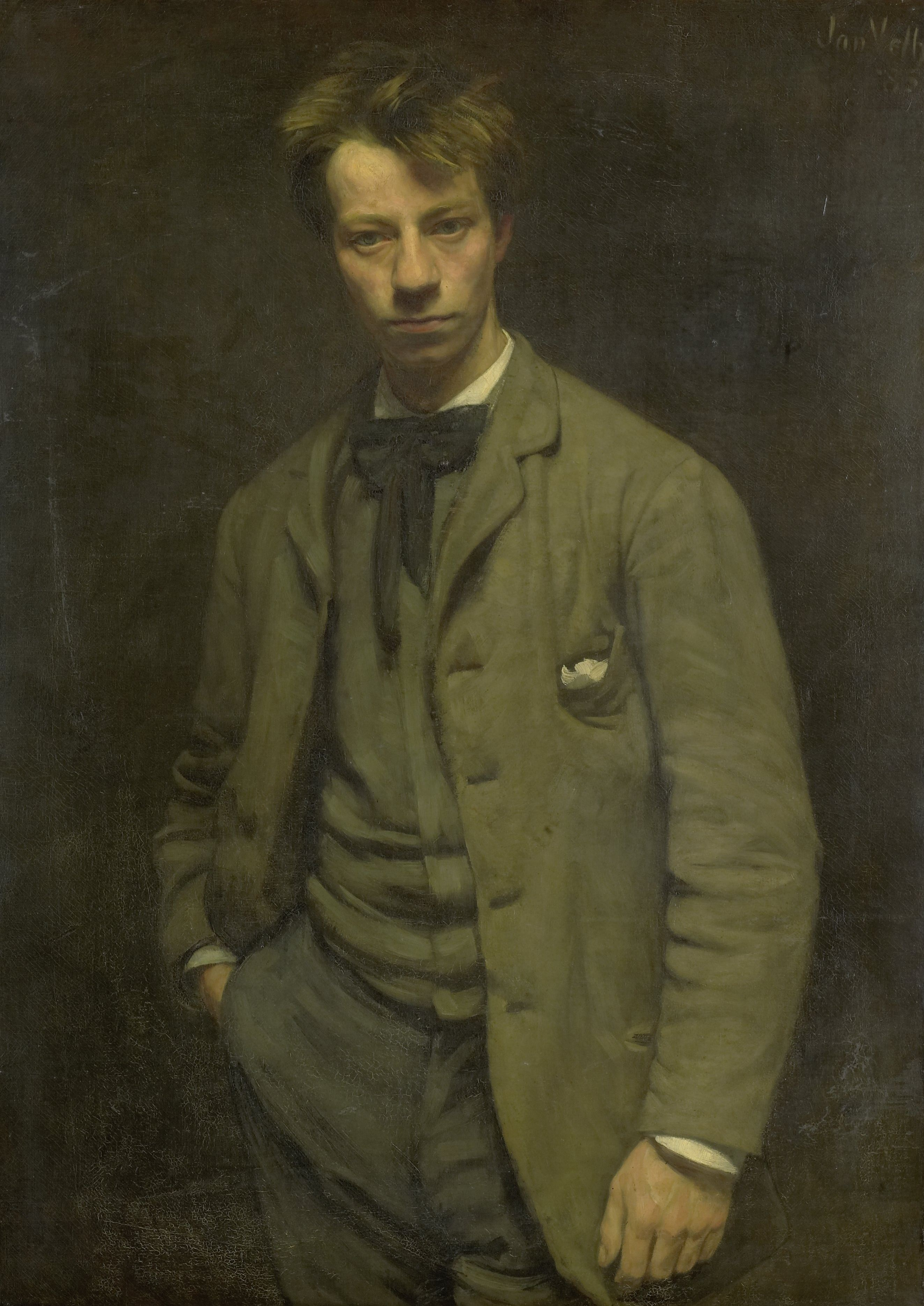
Jan Pieter Veth (1885): Portret van Albert Verwey, Rijksmuseum Amsterdam

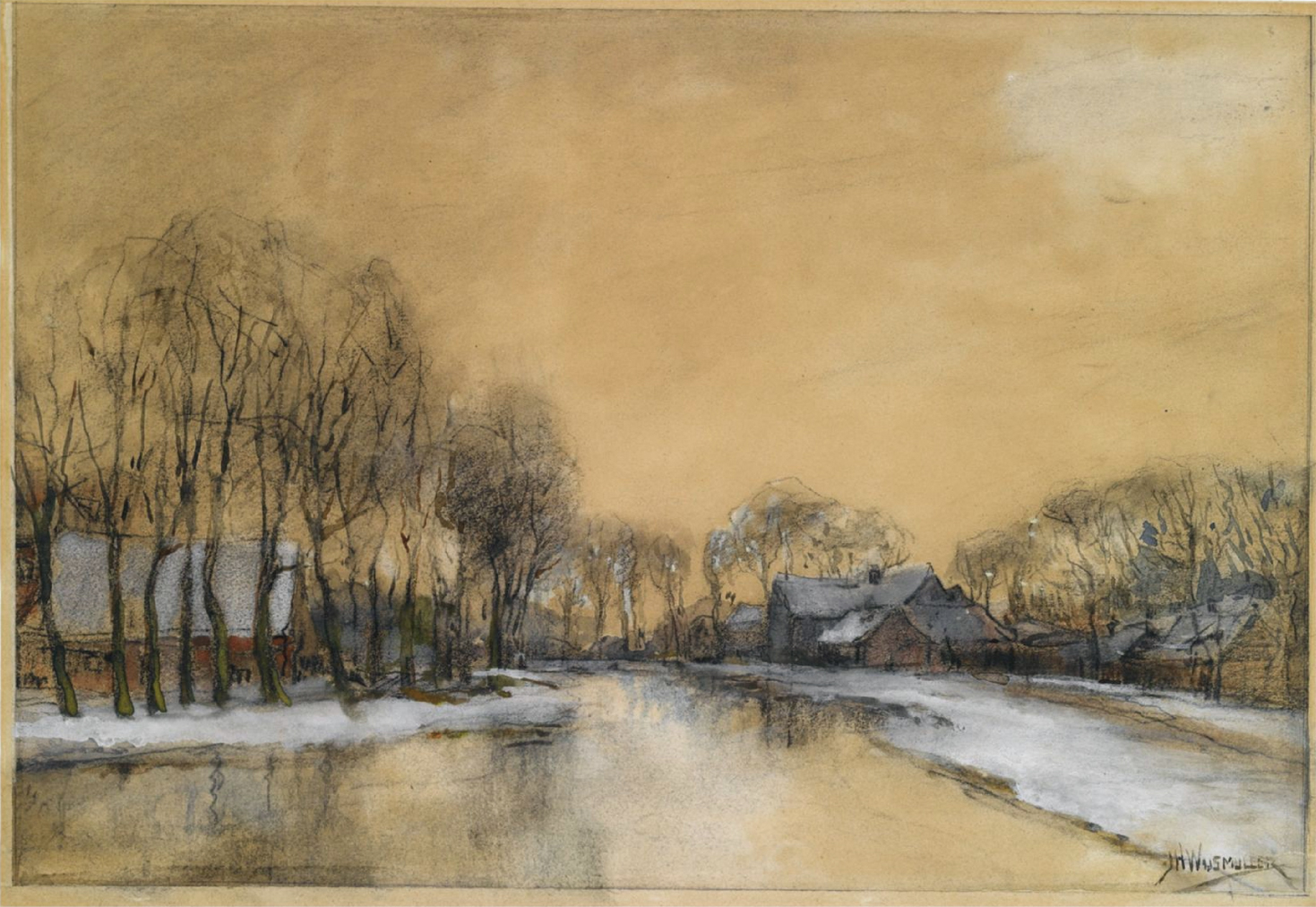
Jan Hillebrand Wijsmuller (1900): A winter landscape with houses along a canal

== Exhibition ==
- Allebé, August 1838 – 1927, Teylers Museum, Dortrecht

== In possession of the Museum a.s.f. ==
- Historisch Museum, Amsterdam,
- Rijksmuseum, Amsterdam,
- Stedelijk Museum, Amsterdam,
- Universiteit van Amsterdam,
- Dordrechtsmuseum, Dordrecht,
- Rijksmuseum "Zuiderzeemuseum", Enkhuizen,
- Teyler Museum, Haarlem,
- Gemeentemuseum, The Hague,
- Museum Mesdag, The Hague,
- Rijksmuseum Köller-Müller, Otterlo,
- Stania State, Oenkerk,
- Leiden Universiteit,
- Museum Boijmans van Beuningen, Rotterdam and
- Fogelsaugh State, Veonkloster.

== Biography ==
- Hammacher, A.W. (1946): Amsterdamsche Impressionisten en hun Kring, Amsterdam, J.M. Meulenhoff
- Loos, Wiepke und van Serooskerken, Carpel van Tuyll (1988): Waarde Heer Allebé – Leven en werk van August Allebé (1838–1927), Wanders, ISBN 90-6630-124-4
- Muller, Sheila D. (2013): Dutch Art – An Encyclopedia, Routledge, ISBN 1-135-49574-2
- Bouret, Jean: L'École de Barbizon et le paysage française au XIXe siècle, Neuchâtel, 1972
- Pillement, Georges: Les Pré-Impressionistes, Zug, 1972, CCLC 638279063
- Berson, Ruth (1989): The new Painting: Impressionism 1874 – 1886, Documentation, 3 Bd., Phaidon Press Ltd. Oxford, ISBN 0-7148-2430-5
- Broude, Norma (1990): Impressionismus – eine Internationale Bewegung 1860–1920, Dumond Buchverlag Köln, ISBN 3-8321-7454-0
- Constable, Freda: John Constable, a biography, 1776–1837, Lavenham, Dalton, 1975, ISBN 0-900963-54-9
- Noon, Patrick (1991): John Parkers Bonington – On the Pleasure of Painting, Balding + Mansell, ISBN 0-300-05108-5
- Sillevis, John; Kraan, Hans und Dorn, Roland 1987: Die Haager Schule, Meisterwerke der Holländischen Malerei des 19. Jahrhunderts aus Haags Gemeentemuseum, Ausst.Kat. Kunsthalle Mannheim, Edition Braus, ISBN 3-925835-08-3
- Pfeifer, Ingrid und Hollein, Max (2008): Impressionistinnen, Aust.-Kat. Kunsthalle Frankfurt, Hatje Crantz, ISBN 3-7757-2078-2
- Die Düsseldorfter Malerschule 1830–1920, Bd. 1 und 2, Ausst.-Kat. D'dorf, ISBN 3-86568-702-4
- House, John und Stevens Mary Anne (1979): Post-Impresionism, Weidenfeld and Nicolson London, ISBN 0-297-77713-0
- Guratzsch, Hedwig (1979): Die große Zeit der niederländischen Malerei, Herder, ISBN 3-451-18218-1
- Brax, Dr. d. (1952): Hollandes en vlaamse Schilderkunst in Zuid-Afríka, J.H. de Bussy Amsterdam
- Heilmann, Christoph; Clarke, Michael und Sillevis, John (1996): Corot, Courbet und die Maler von Barbizon (Les amis de la nature), Klinkhardt & Biermann, ISBN 3-7814-0395-5
- Loos, Wiepke; te Rijdt, Robert Jan und van Heteren, Marjan (1997): Niederländische Landschaftsmaler: Meisterwerke des 18. und des 19. Jahrhunderts, Ausst.-Kat. Belser Verlag, ISBN 3-7630-2353-4
- Bühler, Hans Peter (1979): Die Schule von Barbizon, Verlag F. Bruckmann KG, München, 1979
- Moffet, Charles S. (1986): The New Painting 1878–1886, Ausst.-Kat. Phaidon Oxford, ISBN 0-7148-2430-5
- Beyeler, Ernst (2002): Claude Monet und die Geburt des Impressionismus, Ausst.-Kat., Prestel, ISBN 3-7913-5414-0
- Aschoff, Ulrike (2014): Camille Pissarro – der Vater des Impressionismus, Ausst.-Kat. von der Heydt Museum, ISBN 3-89202-091-4
- Lorenceau, Bernhard (1996): Johan Barthold Jongkind – 1819 –1891, Brame Lorenceau Paris, ISBN 2-9510156-0-7
- van Eikeren, Johan H. (1947): De Amsterdamse Joffers: Maria E. van Regteren Altena, Ans van den Berg, Jo Bauer-Stumpff, Nelly Bodenheim., Lizzy Ansingh, Coba Ritsema, Coba Surie, Betsie Westendorp-Osieck, ISBN 90-5897-422-7
- Glorie, Ingrid (2000): Juffers en Joffers: een eerbewijs aan vrouwen in de schilderkunst, De Doelenpers, ISBN 90-70655-27-6
- Wright, Christopher (1980): Paintings in Dutch Museums, Philip Wilson Publishers Ltd., London, ISBN 0-85667-077-4

== Publications ==
- J. Knoef, onbekende grafiek van A. Allebé, Oud Holland, 68, 1953, Seite 174–178
- A. Hoogendoorn, Een jeugdwerk von August Allebé, Oud Holland, 69, 1954, Seite 58 ff.
