= Goovaerts =

Goovaerts is a Dutch surname. Notable people with this surname include:

- Agustín Goovaerts, Belgian architect and engineer
- Henri Goovaerts (1865–1912), Dutch painter
- Renée Goovaerts, wife of Alberto Cortez (1940–2019), Argentinian singer and songwriter
