= Gerard Muller =

Dutch painter (1861–1929)

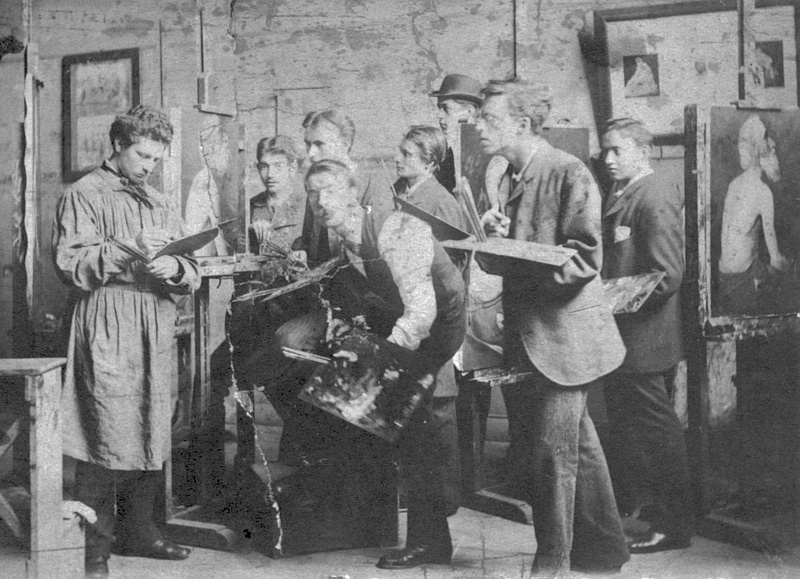
- Students at the Academy in Antwerp, 1882–1883. Muller is the 4th from the right.
- Born: Gerard Gustaaf Muller; 20 January 1861; Amsterdam, Netherlands
- Died: 26 March 1929, Amsterdam; Amsterdam, Netherlands
- Education: Royal Academy of Fine Arts (Antwerp)
- Known for: Painter
- Movement: Orientalist

Gerard Gustaaf Muller (20 January 1861 – 26 March 1929) was a Dutch Impressionist painter associated with the Tachtigers literary movement. His later works show elements of Orientalism.

== Biography ==
His father, Johan Werner Anton Muller, was a ship owner. He had two older brothers; Hendrik (1855-1927), a writer, and Karel, an architect. From 1880 to 1884, he studied at the Rijksakademie with August Allebé. While there, Hendrik introduced him and his friends, Jacobus van Looy and Jan Veth, to a group called "Flanor", precursor of the Tachtiger (Eighties) movement.

From 1884 to 1888, he studied at the Royal Academy of Fine Arts in Antwerp with Charles Verlat. In 1887, he took second place for the Willink van Collenprijs. The following year, he returned to Amsterdam and took up residence at a house near the Oosterpark which would also be home to George Breitner and Isaac Israëls, among others.

At this time, he created mostly watercolors of city scenes with figures. Later, he made several long trips; to Spain (1900), Italy (1913) and Morocco (1920). His work gradually came to show an obvious southern influence and many had Orientalist features.

In early 1918, he held an exhibition at the showroom of the "Maatschappij Panorama" and made the acquaintance of Louis Couperus, who held a lecture there in February; a meeting that received positive notice in the Algemeen Handelsblad. He and Couperus would become regular correspondents after that.

For many years, he was a member of Arti et Amicitiae; serving as its secretary and, later, as treasurer. In 1889, he married Jenny Juliette "Jetje" Roos (1865-1957), a comic actress.

== Selected paintings ==
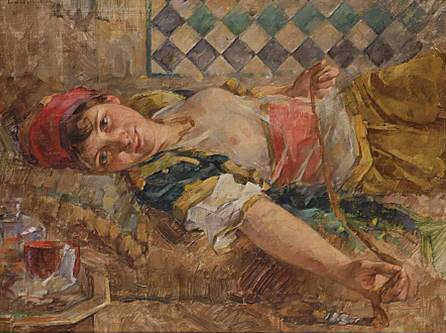
Invitation

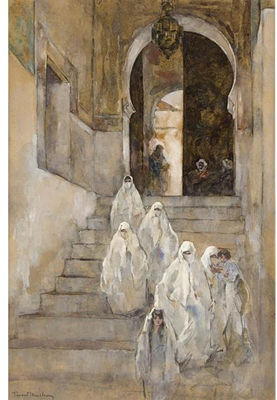
Figures in the
Medina Quarter

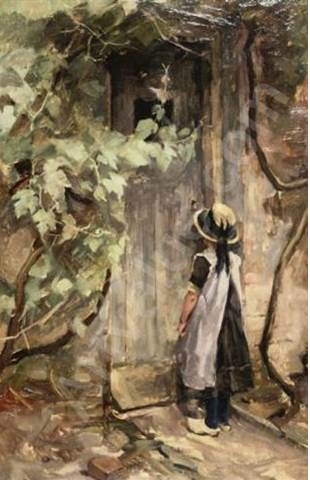
Girl at the Door

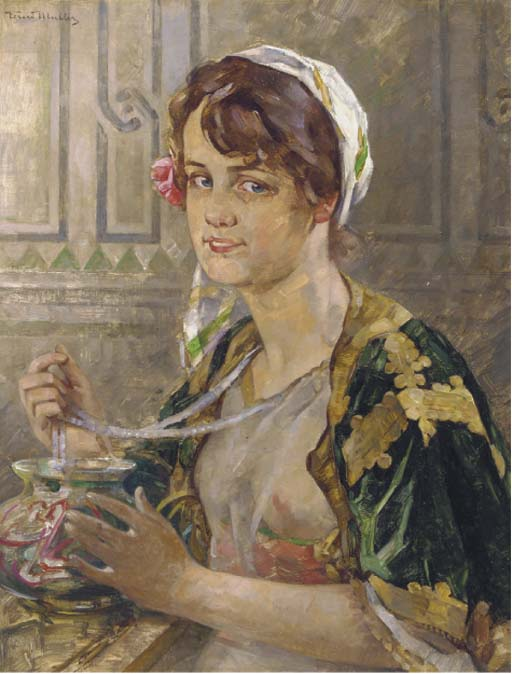
Fancy Dress
