= Hobbe Smith =

Dutch painter (1862-1942)

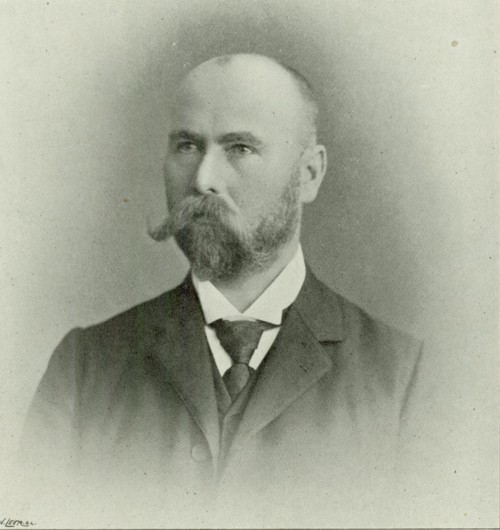
Hobbe Smith (c.1895)

Hobbe Smith (7 December 1862, Witmarsum – 1 May 1942, Amsterdam) was a Dutch painter, watercolorist and graphic designer, in the Post-Impressionist style.

== Biography ==
His father was a house painter and he was apprenticed to a lithographer at a young age. He attended the Rijksakademie van beeldende kunsten, the Tekenacademie (Antwerpen), and the Quellinusschool.

Thanks to a wealthy patron who liked his work, he was able to receive a Royal Scholarship and studied at the Rijksakademie with August Allebé. Later, he took classes at the Royal Academy of Fine Arts in Antwerp with Charles Verlat.

He painted a wide variety of subjects, including nudes, still lifes, portraits, historical scenes and seascapes, influenced by Jacob Maris. In 1888, he won the Willink van Collenprijs. International fame arrived after an exhibition at the Pulchri Studio in 1902. He received a gold medal from Queen Wilhelmina in 1917. He was also a member of Arti et Amicitiae.

Smith's work was included in the 1939 exhibition and sale Onze Kunst van Heden (Our Art of Today) at the Rijksmuseum in Amsterdam.

Works by Hobbe Smith

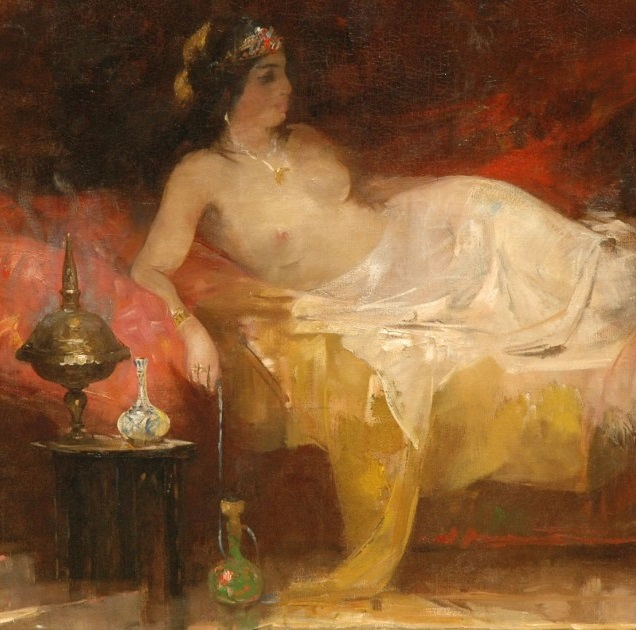
Odalisque

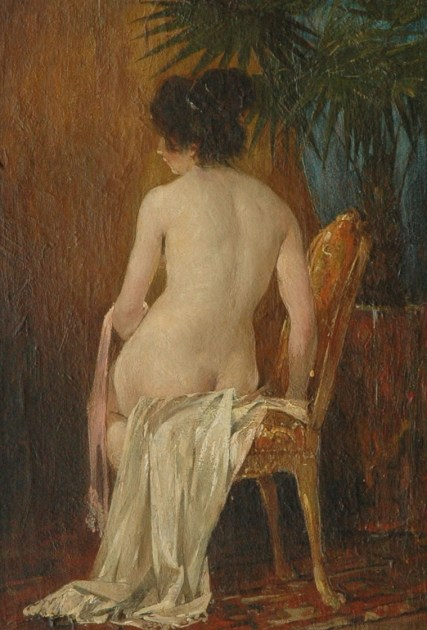
Nude

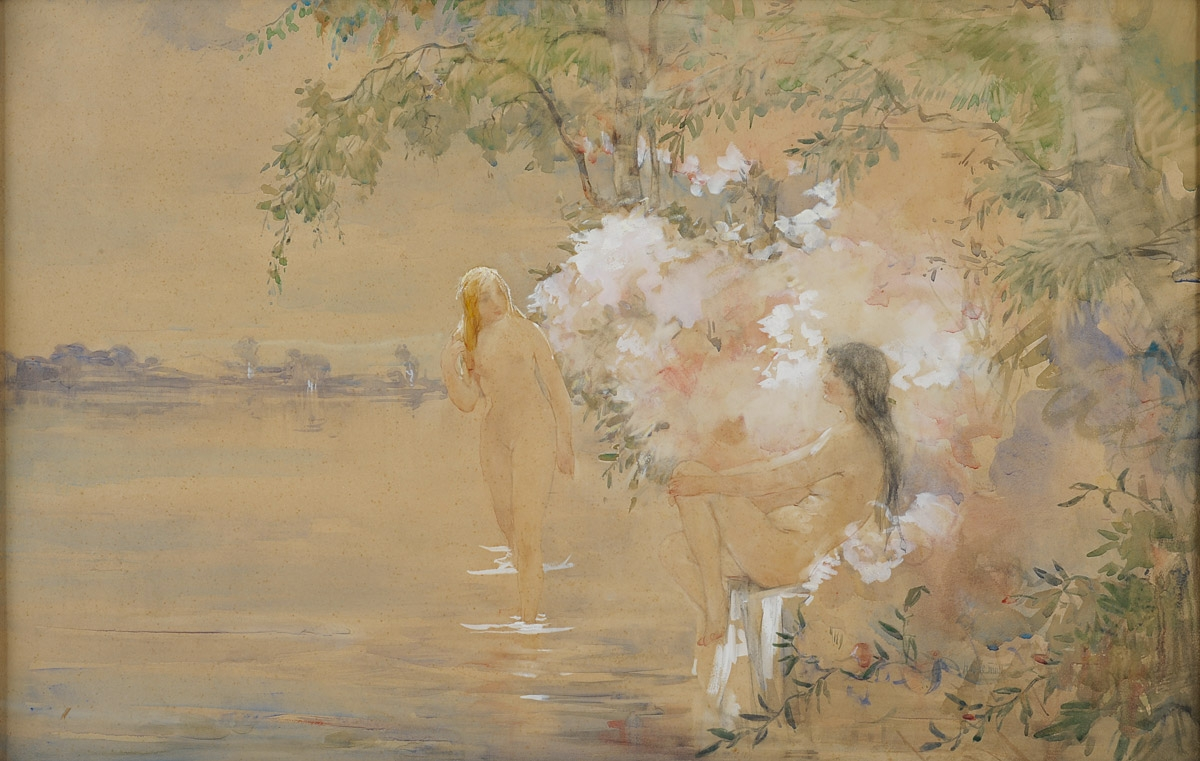
Bathing Nymphs

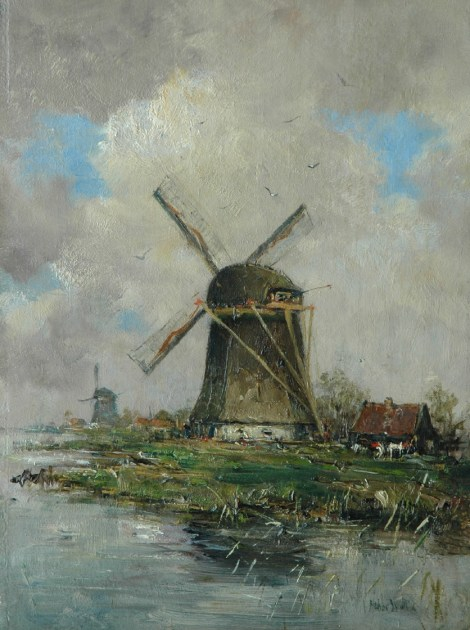
Windmill

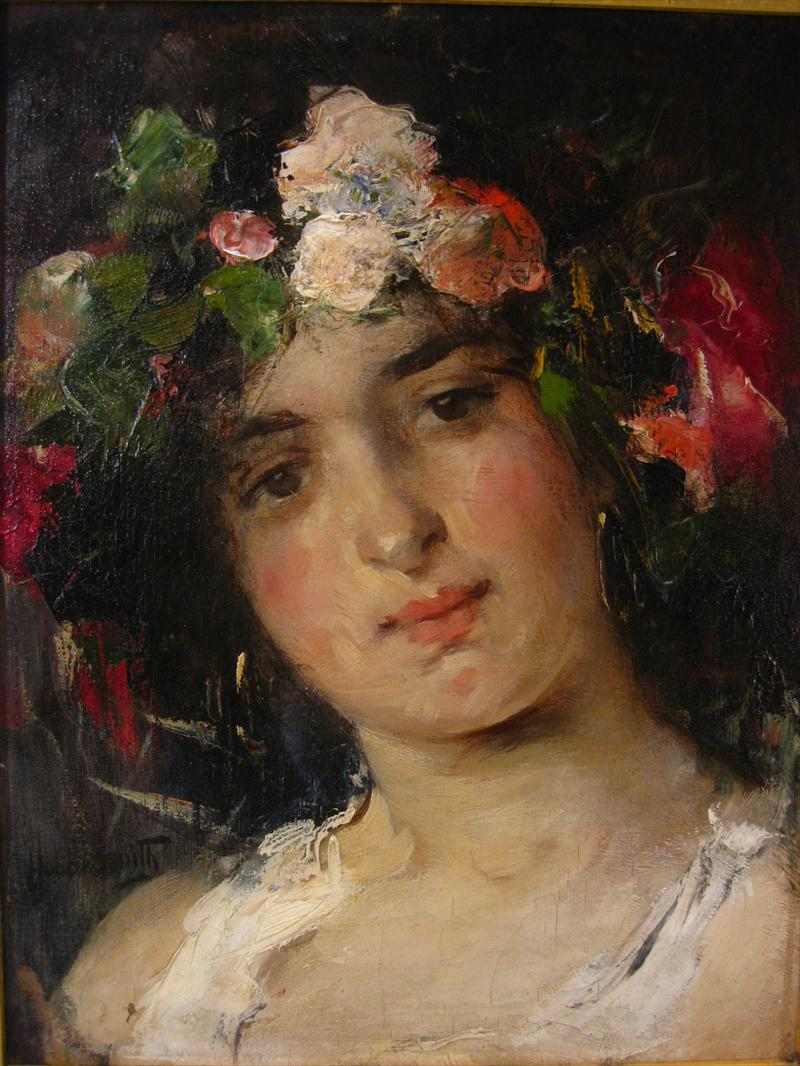
Portrait with Floral Wreath
