= Eduard Frankfort =

Dutch painter (1864–1920)

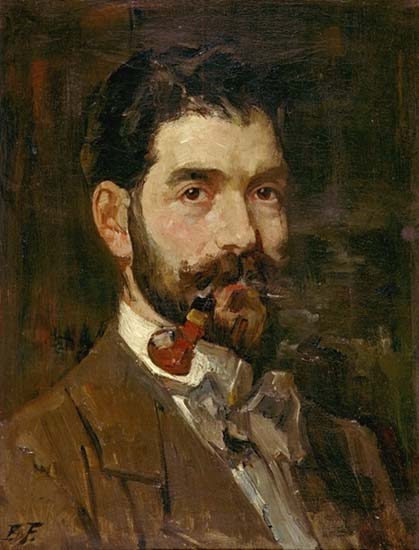
Self-portrait with Pipe (c.1900)

Eduard Salomon Frankfort (21 June 1864 in Meppel – 19 August 1920 in Laren) was a Dutch Jewish painter during the late nineteenth and early twentieth centuries.

== Early life and education ==
Frankfort was born to Salomon Simon Frankfort and Dine Bendien-Frankfort. He was the youngest of eight children. His father was a devoutly religious merchant, and Eduard's upbringing reflected his father's strict religious beliefs. When he was eleven years old, his family moved to Amsterdam, where Salomon Simon Frankfort hoped Eduard would eventually take a municipal job.

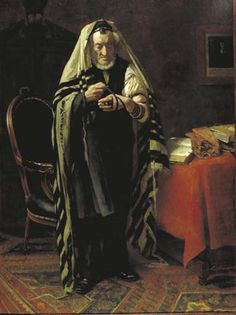
My Father's Morning Prayer

Eduard, however, showed an early interest in painting. From ages eleven to seventeen, he underwent formal training at Atelier Bing to become a visual artist. In 1887, he studied under master painter August Allebé at the Rijksakademie van Beeldende Kunsten (the Royal Academy for Visual Arts) in Amsterdam. Afterwards, he studied painting for several months at the Koninklijke Academie voor Schone Kunsten Antwerpen (the Antwerp Royal Academy of Fine Arts) in Antwerp, Belgium.

== Career ==
Eduard Frankfort remained in Amsterdam until 1905. Many of his paintings featured Jewish religious themes. Like other contemporary artists, Frankfort was drawn to Laren. In 1903, he was awarded a gold medal by the Royal Art Society "Arti et Amicitiae". He was highly regarded at that time and was asked to teach at several schools. In 1905, he followed his sister to South Africa, where he toured and painted portraits. One such portrait he did during this time was of Esther de Boer-van Rijk.

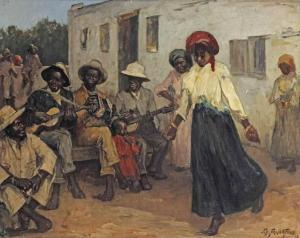
A Musical Gathering in South Africa

After his tour of South Africa, Eduard Frankfort returned to Amsterdam, where he married Klara Kloots in 1911. The couple lived on Beethovenstraat in Amsterdam and had four children. Eduard Frankfort was a member of several professional societies, including "Arti et Amiticiae" and "Pulchri Studio". He was awarded the Diploma of the Royal Academy of Holland, the Royal Gold Medal of "Arti et Amiticiae" and four medals from the Academy of Holland at art exhibitions in Paris, St. Louis, Arnhem and Barcelona.

== Death and legacy ==
Eduard Frankfort continued to paint and lead a distinguished career until his death on 19 August 1920, at age 56. A magazine called De Vrijdagavond published an obituary that said "he was still young".

His family's copies of his work are now on display at the Joods Historisch Museum (Jewish Historical Museum) in Amsterdam. Other works by Eduard Frankfort continue to be sought by collectors.

== External links and sources ==
- (nl) Joods Historisch Museum | Frankfort, Eduard
- (nl) EDUARD SALOMON FRANKFORT
- (en) Jewish Historical Museum | Resource centre acquisitions 2005
