= Herman Mees =

Dutch painter (1880–1964)

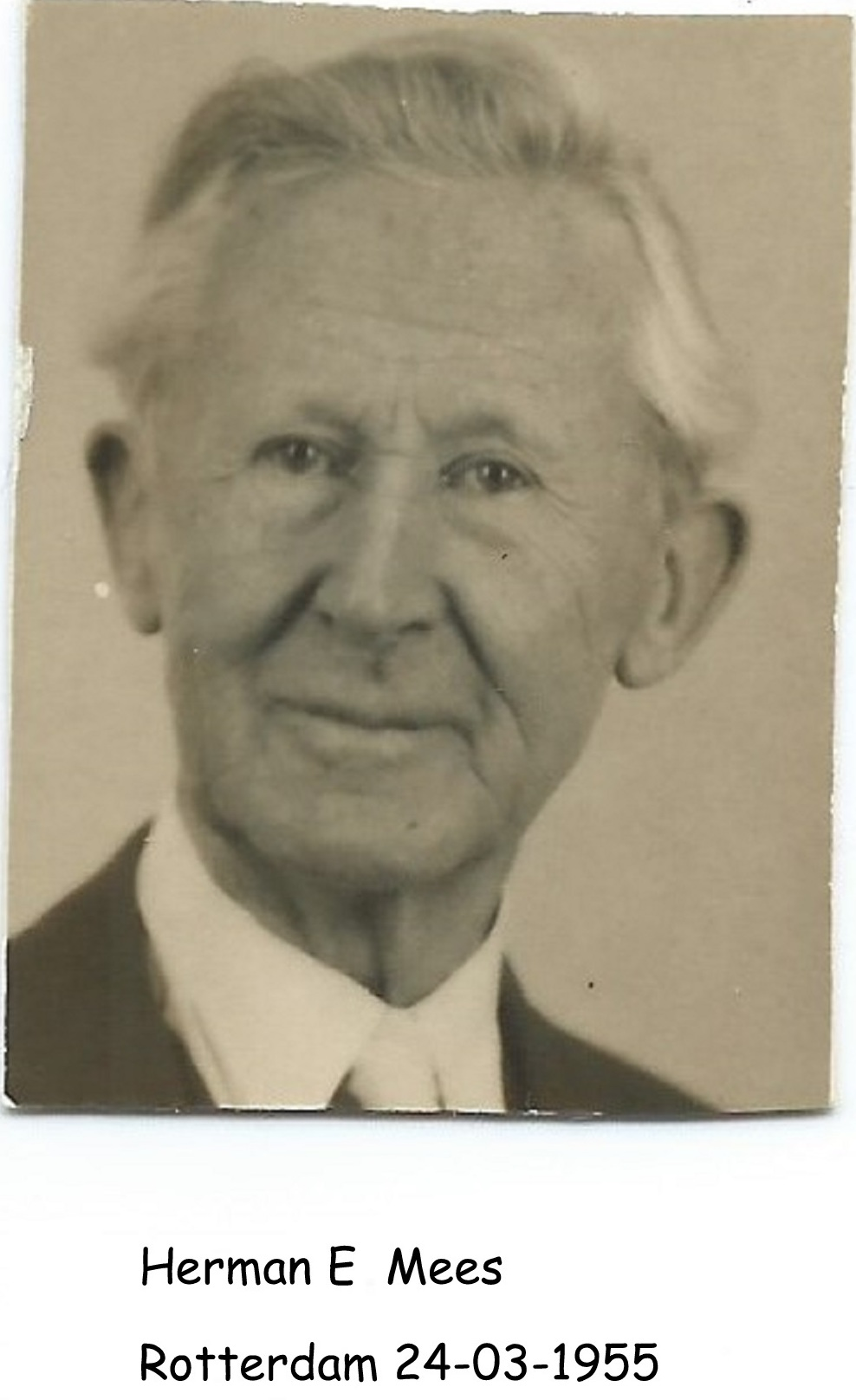
Pasfoto van herman mees

Hermanus "Herman" Ellen Mees (18 September 1880 – 28 November 1964) was a Dutch artist, active as painter, watercolorist, draftsman, pastelist, lithographer, and academy lecturer. He was specialized in portrait painting.

== Life and work ==
Mees was born on 18 September 1880, in Veendam, to physician Willem Mees and Geertruida Hermina Oving. In 1897, the family moved to Rotterdam. There he passed his exams for the Hogere Burgerschool in 1899. He studied architecture at the Polytechnic School in Delft for one year in 1900, attended the Rijksakademie in Amsterdam from 1901 to 1903, and in 1902-1903 also the Academy of Visual Arts in Rotterdam, and the Academy of Fine Arts in The Hague from 1904 to 1905. In The Hague he graduated in 1905, obtaining a teacher diploma for secondary drawing education. He had studied under August Allebé and Willem van Konijnenburg.

Mees was interested in theosophy. The theosophical philosophy prescribed a simple life without much needs. After obtaining this degree, he went out into the world. After wandering in London, Paris, Munich and Dresden, he settled in London, where the headquarters of the Theosophical movement were located. There he met Arthur Ayliffe with whom he had many philosophical debates. He spent much time in the London parks, making hundreds of pencil sketches and pencil studies. In 1914 Mees moved to Spain, but soon had to flee because of the war.

In 1917, Mees accepted a position as a teacher at the Rotterdam Art Academy, now Willem de Kooning Academy. The Academy gave him the first years annual five-month study break. He stayed mainly in Italy and Spain. In 1924, Mees was promoted head lecturer of the Rotterdam Academy, where he remained in service until 1943.

Mees's work was included in the 1939 exhibition and sale Onze Kunst van Heden (Our Art of Today) at the Rijksmuseum in Amsterdam.

Mees became known for his portraits of Utrecht professors and Rotterdam businessmen and harbor barons. He also painted many portraits of children. He was a member of the Pulchri Studio. Mees visited various exhibitions to keep abreast of new developments in art. At the age of 80, he traveled with his wife to Morocco to paint portraits there. Eventually he spent his last years in Zuidlaren. He died there on 28 November 1964.

In appreciation for his life's work in 1951 Mees received the first Penning van de Leuve, which was awarded by the Rotterdam Art Foundation.
