= Arnold Marc Gorter =

Dutch painter (1866–1933)

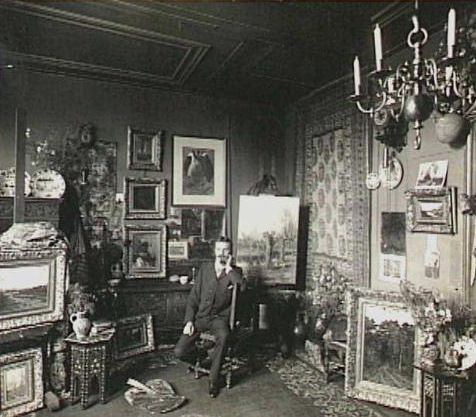
Gorter in his workshop in 1903, photograph by Sigmund Löw

Arnold Marc Gorter (1866, Almelo – 1933, Amsterdam), was a 19th-century landscape painter from the Eastern Netherlands.

== Biography ==
According to the RKD he was a pupil of August Allebé and Pierre Cuypers at the Rijksnormaalschool voor Teekenonderwijzers in Amsterdam in 1888, and the Rijksakademie van beeldende kunsten there in (1889-1891). He was a member of the Pulchri studio and Arti et Amicitiae. A president of the artists' association Arti et Amicitiae, he was a favorite of the Dutch Queen Wilhelmina.

Gorter is known for landscapes and won a gold medal at the Paris salon in 1910. In 1922 he accompanied Wilhelmina of the Netherlands on a trip to Norway as her painting teacher. Other less famous pupils of Gorter were Marinus Bies, Carel Lodewijk Dake, his niece Hinke Gorter, Maria Elisabeth van Hengel, Albertus Gerhard Hulshoff Pol, Johan Meijer(1885-1970), Leendert Johan Muller, and Henri van Os-Delhez.

== Works of Art ==
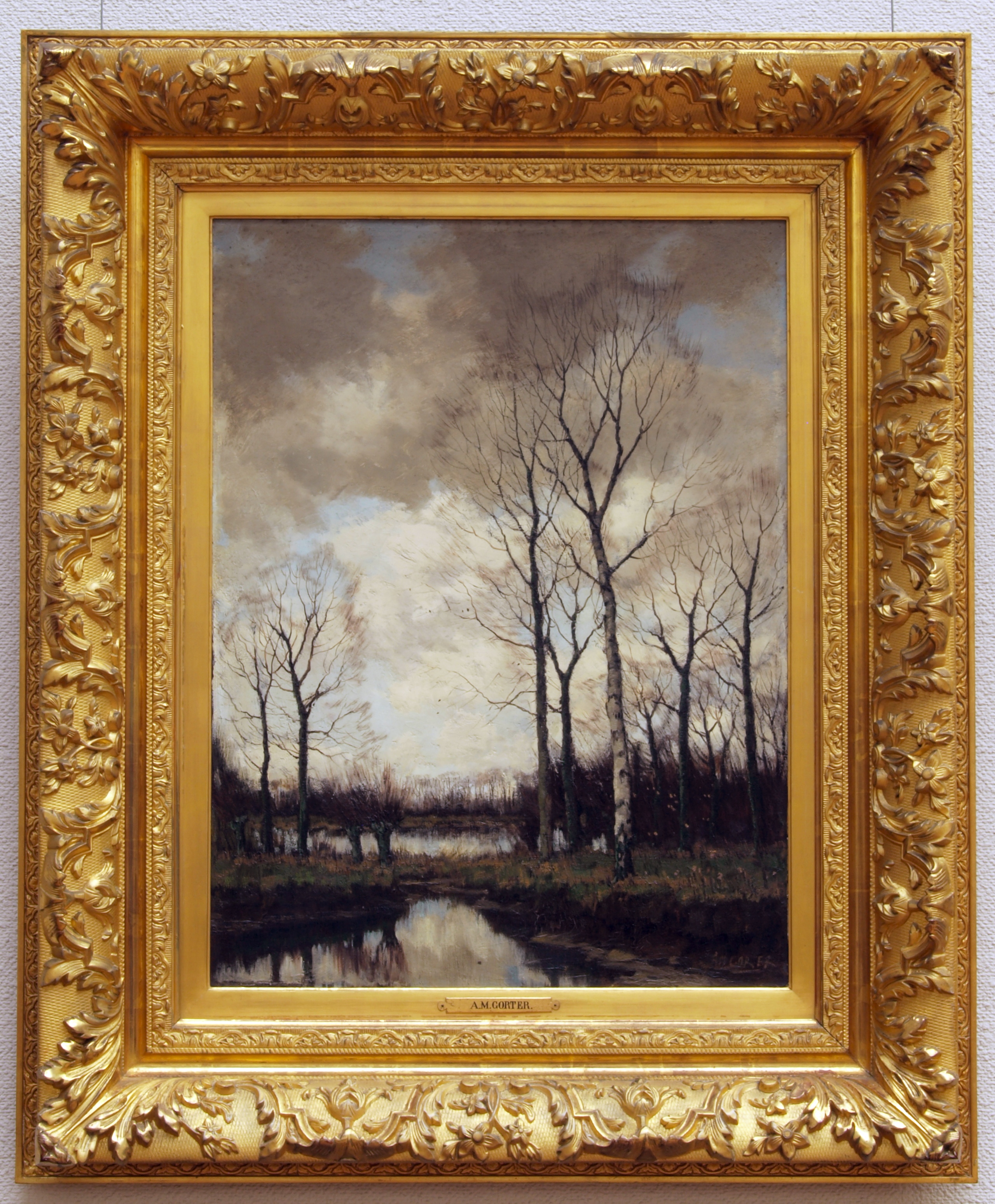
November mood, 1905, collection Teylers Museum

- A Brook In A Forest
- A Cowherdress With Her Cattle
- A Forest Pond
- A Moonlit Winterlandscape
- A Mother and Child Strolling Along a Waterway
- A Stream in Snow Covered Woods
- A View of the Vordense Beek
- A View of the Vordense Beek 2
- An Autumn Landscape, Vordense Beek
- An Autumn Landscape 2
- An Orchard in Spring
- Autumn
- Birch Trees in Autumn
- Birches Along the Vordense Beek
- Birches in Autumn
- Brook in a Forest
- Canal Landscape With Trees
- Cows Grazing Along a Stream
- Cows Grazing By A Stream In A Wooded Landscape
- Cows Grazing Near the Vordense Beek
- Cows in a Forest Landscape
- Cows in a Sunny Autumn Landscape
- Cows on a Birchpath
- Ducks in a Meadow, in Spring
- Early Spring
- Herfstgoud Beech Trees in Autumn
- Homeward Bound
- Homeward Bound in Winter
- Leading the Cattle Along a Country Track
- Sheep in a Sunny Autumn Landscape
- The Bend in the River
- The Vordense Beek
- The Vordense Beek 2
- The Vordense Beek 3
- The Vordense Beek 4
- The Vordense Beek 5
- The Vordense Beek 6
- The Vordense Beek in Autumn
- The Vordense Beek in Autumn 2
- The Vordense Beek in Winter
- Vordense Beek Cows in a Meadow Near a Stream
