= Dake =

Dake is a surname. Notable people with the surname include:

- Arthur Dake (1910–2000) American chess player
- Charles Romeyn Dake (1849–1899) American homeopathic physician and writer
- Crawley P. Dake (1836–1890), U.S. Marshal for the Arizona Territory
- Finis Jennings Dake (1902–1987) American Pentecostal minister and evangelist
- Kyle Dake (born 1991), American sport wrestler
- Lillian Dake Heath (Lillian Josephine Dake; 1864–1961) American painter, teacher
- Terrence R. Dake (born 1944), American military leader, United States Marine Corps four-star general

== Other ==
- Dake, Loudi (大科街道), a subdistrict of Louxing District, Loudi City, Hunan, China
