= Ernst Witkamp =

Dutch painter

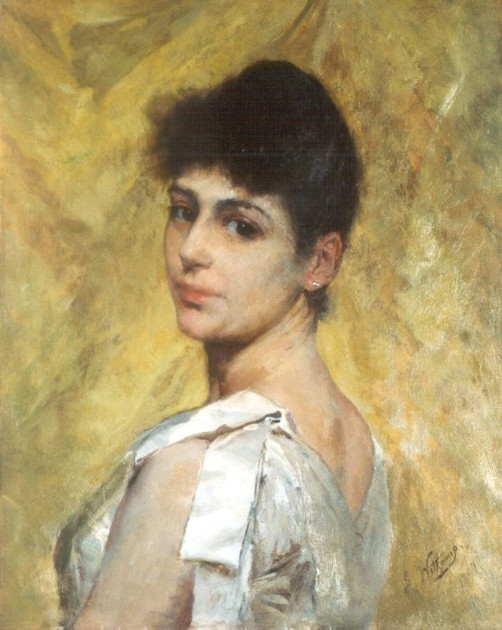
Study of a young woman

Ernst Witkamp (1854–1897), was a Dutch painter.

He was born in Amsterdam and was a pupil of August Allebé, Barend Wijnveld, Louis Koopman and Jacob Olie at the Rijksakademie van Beeldende Kunsten there. He was a member of Arti et Amicitiae and won the Willink van Collen prize. He was curator of the Museum Fodor during the years 1894–1897. He died in Amsterdam.
