= Henri Goovaerts =

Dutch painter (1865–1912)

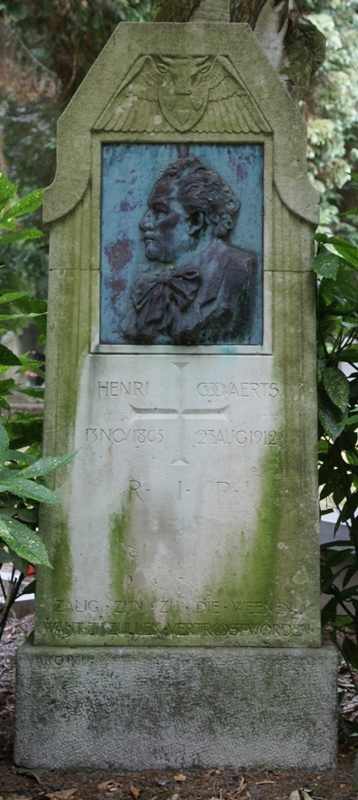
Goovaerts' gravestone, in Maastricht

Henri Florimond Goovaerts (13 November 1865, in Maastricht – 23 August 1912, in Maastricht) was a Dutch painter. He was the son of a house painter and had to help his father at a young age with painting ornaments on ceilings. Soon he began to paint on canvas.

Goovaerts decided to become a painter and against the wishes of his father he attended the Academy of Mechelen in Belgium. There he studied from 1883 to 1885 and was taught by, among others, academy director Willem Geerts.

From 1887 to 1889, he studied at the Academy in Amsterdam and took off during this study to compete for the Prix de Rome, which he won in 1890. He studied in Amsterdam with his friend and fellow student Alphonse Olterdissen; they returned to Maastricht where they opened a small private art school.

After his study, Goovaerts returned to Maastricht, where he founded a studio. He focused mainly on painting portraits, although he occasionally got other jobs as well.

Goovaerts died at the age of 46 on 23 August 1912.

Most of the work of Goovaerts is held by individuals all over the world and a few museums, amongst others the Bonnefantenmuseum in Maastricht. A park in Maastricht bears his name.

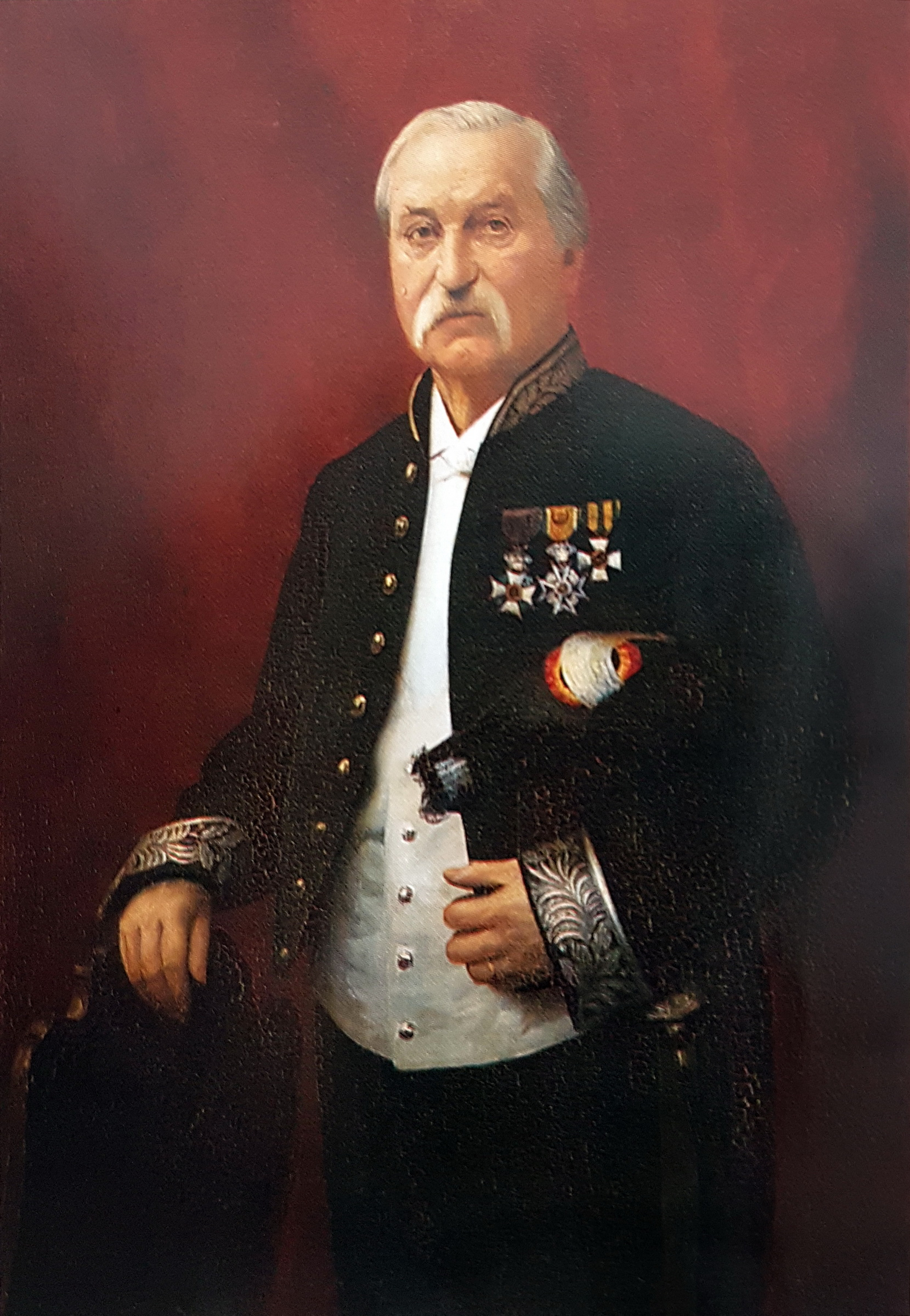
Portrait of G. D. L. Franquinet

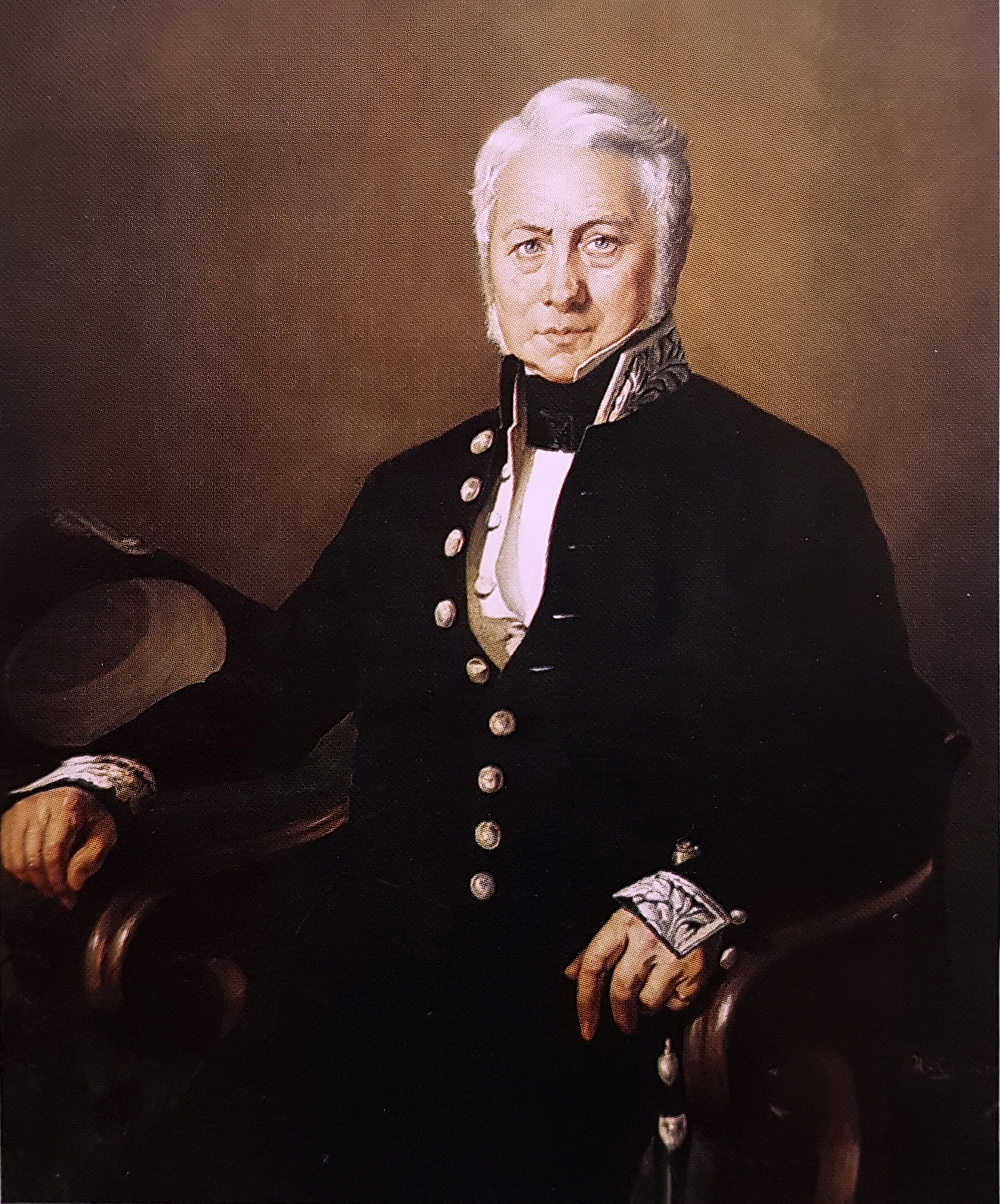
Portrait of Jean François Hennequin

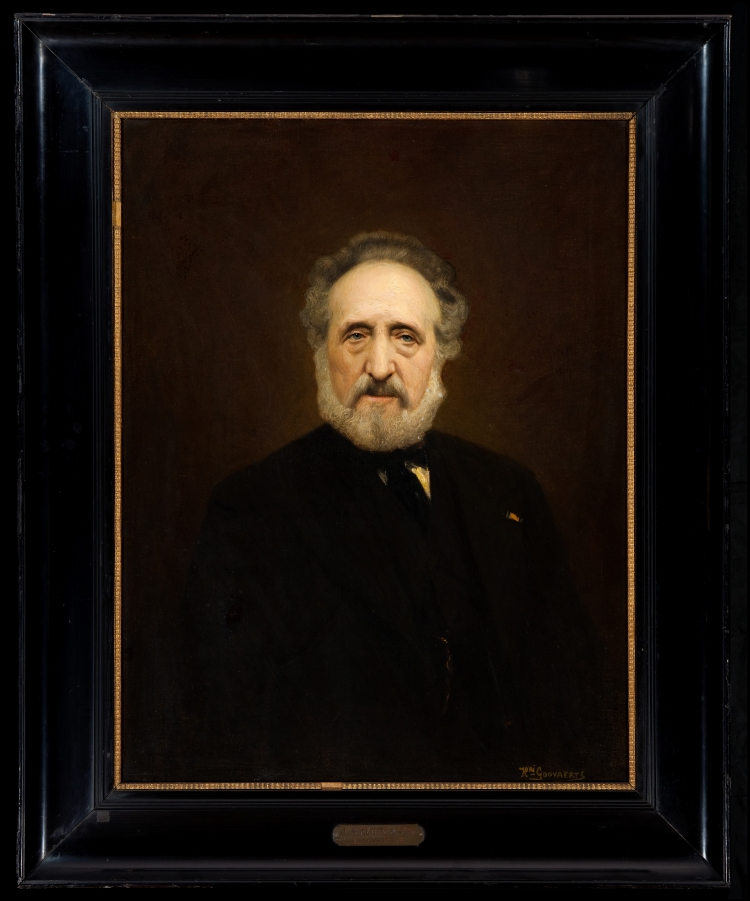
Portrait of Johannes Augustus Keurenaer
