= Molkenboer =

Molkenboer is a Dutch surname.

Notable people with this surname include:

- Theo Molkenboer (architect) (1796-1863), Dutch architect
- Hermanna Molkenboer-Trip (1851–1911), Dutch industrialist
- Willem Molkenboer (1844-1915), Dutch sculptor

His children:
- Theo Molkenboer (1871–1920), Dutch painter
- Antoon Molkenboer (1872-1960), Dutch painter
- Bernard Molkenboer (1879-1948), Dutch monk and literary scholar
- Phemia Molkenboer (1883–1940), Dutch ceramist
