= Luns =

- Joseph Luns (1911 - 2002), a Dutch diplomat, politician and fifth Secretary General of the NATO.
- Huib Luns (1881 - 1942), a Dutch artist and author, father of Joseph Luns
- Logical Unit Number is the identifier of a SCSI logical unit.
