= Huib Luns =

Dutch painter and sculptor (1881–1942)

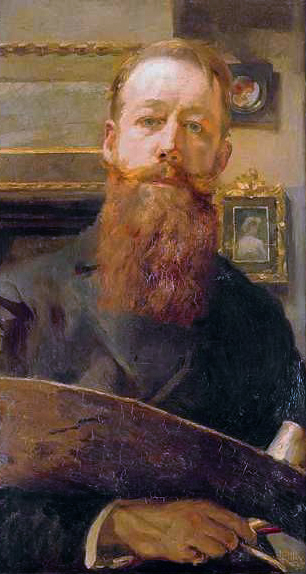
Self-portrait (1907)

Huibert Marie Luns (6 June 1881, Paris – 24 February 1942, Amsterdam) was a Dutch painter, sculptor and writer. He also designed book covers, posters and medals.

== Biography ==
Shortly after his birth, his parents returned to Amsterdam. His interest in art was inspired by a visit to the studios of Lawrence Alma-Tadema, a Dutch painter who lived in London. He received his first drawing lessons from the brothers Antoon and Theo Molkenboer, then went to the Rijksnormaalschool for arts and crafts in Amsterdam and served an internship at the Rijksakademie.

He established his first studio in Brussels, where his parents were then living, and became a member of Pour L'Art; an association of young artists. While there, he worked with the Belgian sculptor, Charles van der Stappen. In 1904, he entered the Prix de Rome competition, but his friend, Jan Sluijters, was the winner. That same year, he was a runner-up for the Willink van Collenprijs. Four years later, he became a teacher at the Academie voor Beeldende Kunsten en Technische Wetenschappen (now known as the "Willem de Kooning Academie") in Rotterdam.

In 1909, he married Harriet Louvrier (1889-1977), from Tongeren. They had six children, including Joseph Luns, who served as Minister of Foreign Affairs (1952-1971) and Secretary-General of NATO (1971-1984).

In 1917 Luns was appointed as principal of the Koninklijke School voor Kunst, Techniek en Ambacht He remained in this position for five years. In 1923, he became Director of the Rijksnormaalschool, a position formerly held by Willem Molkenboer (Antoon and Theo's father). He was awarded the Order of Orange-Nassau in 1930. The following year, he was named a Professor of history painting and sculpture at the Technische Hogeschool Delft, where he remained until his retirement.

Despite his administrative and teaching duties, he continued to be active as a painter and writer of art-related books. He also created a statue to commemorate the French refugees who died in the Netherlands during World War I; located in Maastricht.

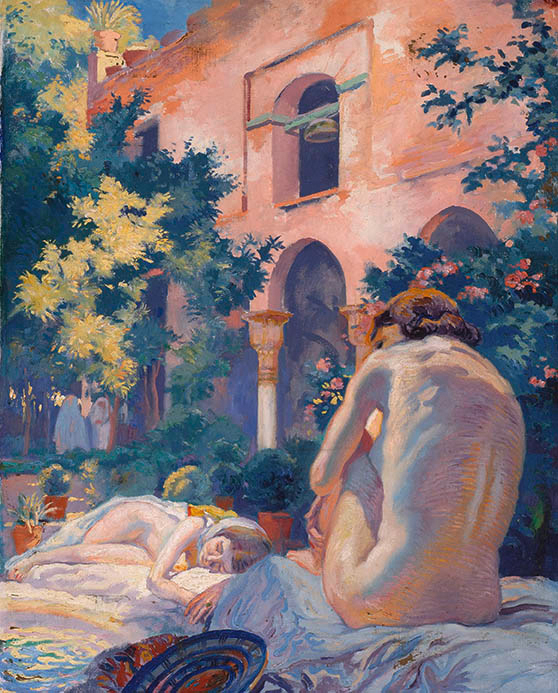
Sitting and Lying Nudes (a marouflage)

Luns' work was included in the 1939 exhibition and sale Onze Kunst van Heden (Our Art of Today) at the Rijksmuseum in Amsterdam.

== Selected writings ==
- De Rubens-symfonie (1927, Van Munster's) Full text @ DBNL
- Tien wandelingen in Napels & Sicilië (1928, W.L. en J. Brusse) Picture of cover @ Goodreads
- Spaansche schilders (1932, W.L. en J. Brusse)
- Holland schildert (1941, Strengholt) Full text @ DBNL
- Jan Sluijters (1941, Palet-serie, H.J.W. Becht)
