= Dominicus Franciscus du Bois =

Flemish artist and draughtsman

Dominicus du Bois
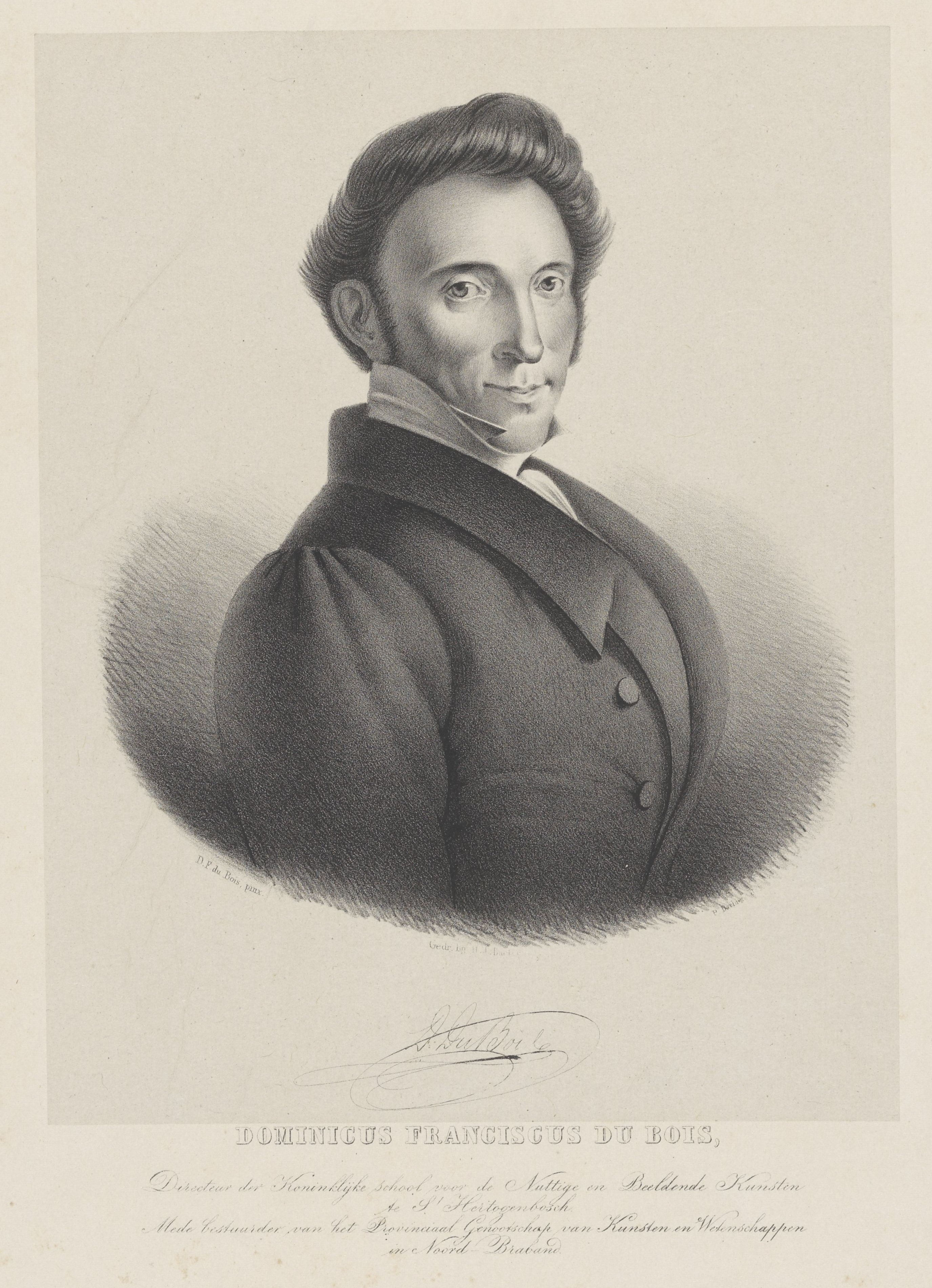
- Dominicus Franciscus du Bois by Pieter Barbiers IV
- Born: Dominique François du Bois; 8 November 1800; Bruges
- Died: 27 October 1840 (aged 39) 's-Hertogenbosch
- Known for: painting, drawing, teaching

Dominicus Franciscus du Bois (8 November 1800 – 27 October 1840) was a Flemish artist and draughtsman. From 1826, he directed the Royal School for Applied and Visual arts in 's-Hertogenbosch.

== Early life ==
Du Bois was born and raised in Bruges, part of France till 1814, and of the United Kingdom of the Netherlands till 1830. In his hometown Du Bois received his artistic schooling from Joseph-François Ducq. He continued his training with Mathijs van Brée in Antwerp. He completed his education with Baron Gros in Paris.

== Principal of the 's-Hertogenbosch Art School ==
In January 1826 Dominicus Franciscus Dubois and Pieter Barbiers from Kampen were appointed as drawing teachers at the 's-Hertogenbosch city academy for drawing and painting. They had to compete for the principal position in a drawing competition. After du Bois had won this competition, he was appointed as principal on 20 June 1826.

Du Bois was later credited for the expansion and quality of the school. In 1828 teachers were appointed to broaden the curriculum to subjects like mathematics, architecture and chemistry. The efforts were successful in the sense that in 1828 the school became a 'Royal School for Applied and Visual arts', with a significant government subsidy for a number of years. The ideas was that the education would enable local artisans and artists (in that order) to compete with their compatriots from other part of the Netherlands. In 1831 a renovation and expansion of the school building which cost 6,000 guilders was finished. The 1831-32 course opened with 300 students.

Du Bois also promoted the organization of exhibitions in 's-Hertogenbosch. The 1828 exhibition was probably the first that was somewhat more than provincial. Abraham Johannes Couwenberg won the landscape category. The category still life with flowers and watercolors was won by G.M. van der Ven. On account of the exhibition Du Bois made a large painting of 184 by 266 cm. It depicts the board of the school with himself and Pieter Barbiers in the background. During Du Bois' administration the school had students like Jan Hendrik van Grootvelt, Thomas van Leent and Joseph Hartogensis.

Du Bois also contributed to culture in 's-Hertogenbosch by being on the board of the Provincial Society for Arts and Sciences in North-Brabant (Provinciaal Genootschap van Kunsten en Wetenschappen in Noord-Brabant), founded in 1837.

== Works ==
Du Bois became famous as an artist by painting some works that very much appealed to the nationalist feelings during the Belgian Revolution. In the antechamber of Noordeinde Palace, two works of him had a prominent place: A work about Jacob Hobein and a work about Jan van Speyk. The painting of Van Speyk was 'The Sacrifice of Van Speyk' (De Zelfopoffering van Van Speyk), which drew a lot of attention. In order to prepare for the painting, Du Bois visited a gunboat of the type that Van Speyk commanded at nearby Fort Crèvecoeur. He gifted the painting to the king, who was the protector of the school.

In 1978 Du Bois' Van Speyk took center stage at an exposition in the Rijksmuseum about nationalist art. A review of the exposition noted that the esthetic value of the exhibited works was minimal, but that these could also be seen as a form of politically engaged art. The review also noted that for these pictures, historical correctness of known details was much more important than esthetics. This is probably the reason why Du Bois was famous at the time, but now receives hardly any attention.

Another reviewer of the 1978 exhibition noted that 'The Sacrifice of Van Speyk' was `very remarkable' because it seemed to be a precursor of magic realism. There is no reason at all to suppose that Du Bois had any significant influence in the development of art. However, the remark seems less outlandish when one compares Dubois' later paintings to his earlier picture which depicts the board of the school.

== Gallery ==
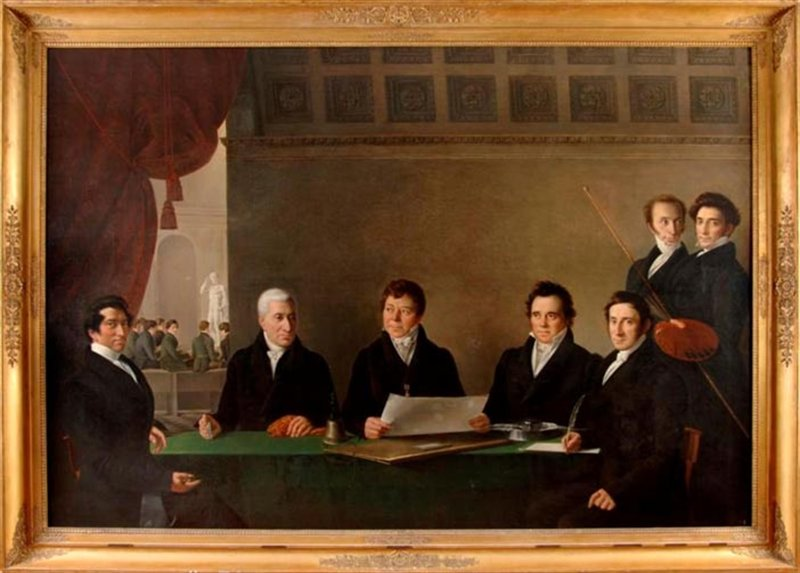
The board of the Royal School for Applied and Visual arts

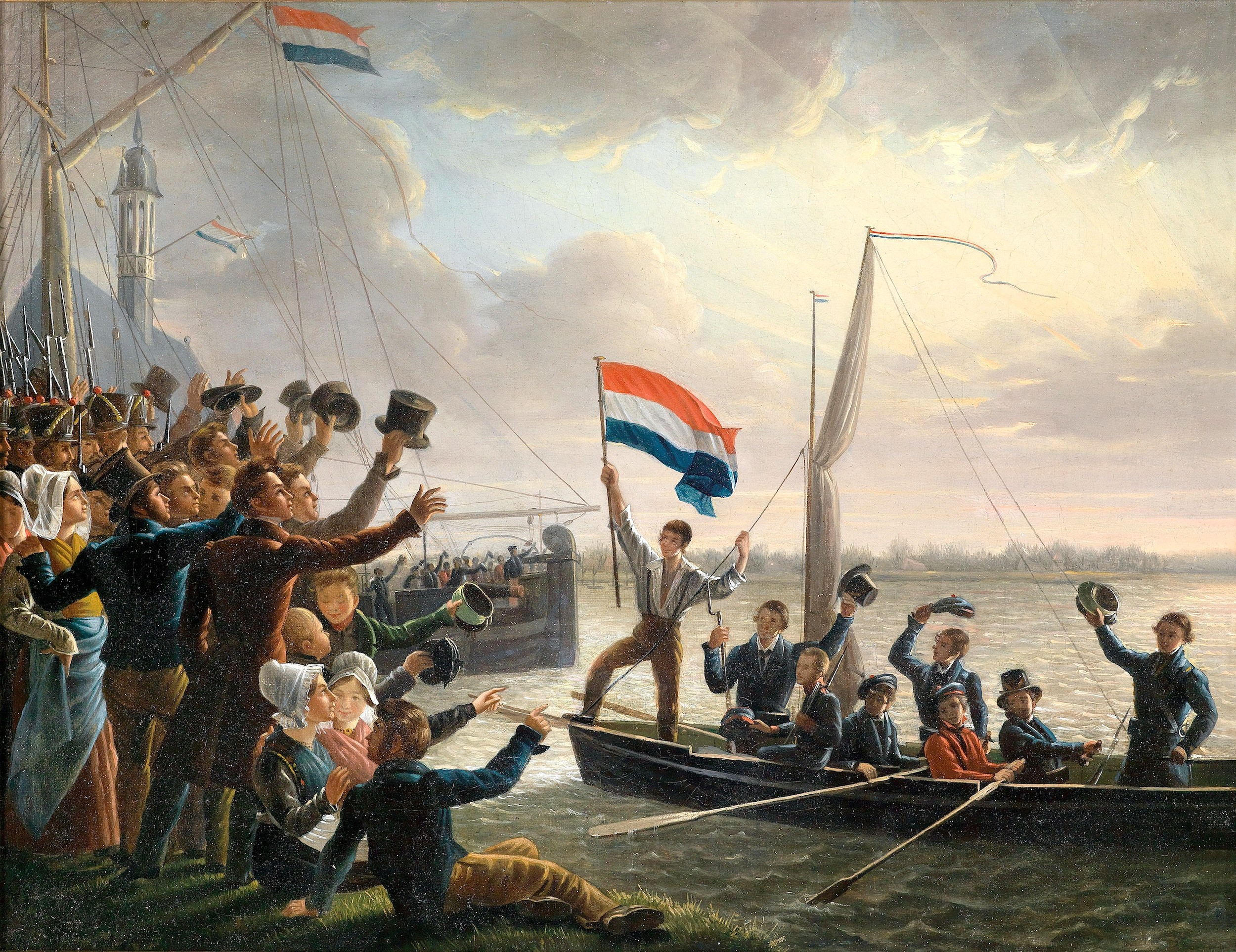
Return of Jacob Hobein on 19 March 1831

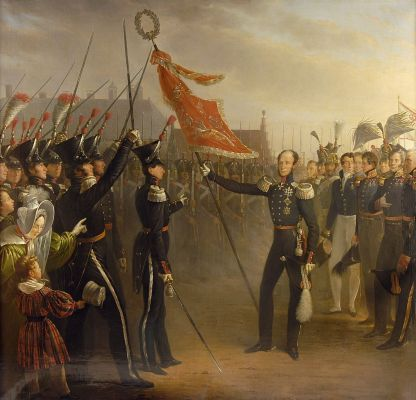
Presentation of regimental colors to the 's-Hertogenbosch militia on 24 July 1831

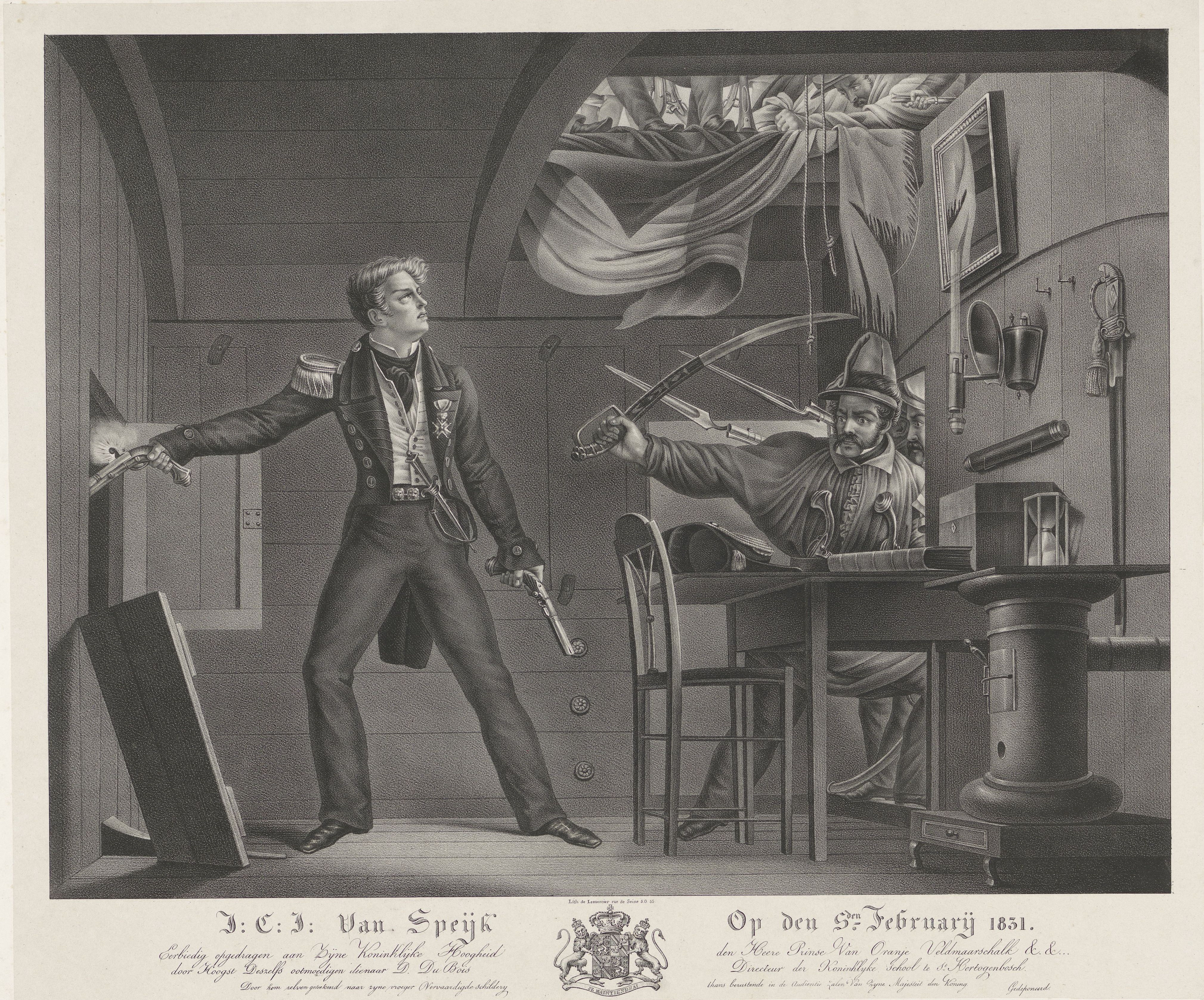
Litho of Du Bois' painting of Van Speyk
