= Marc Bijl =

Dutch artist (born 1970)

- Born: 7 July 1970 (age 55); Leerdam, Netherlands
- Education: Royal Academy of Arts and Design ('s-Hertogenbosch) 1992 - 1997, Glasgow School of Art 1996
- Known for: Sculpture, painting, and installation art

Marc Bijl (Leerdam, 7 July 1970) is a Dutch artist who lives and works in Berlin. His works are based upon social issues and their use of symbols and rules. This can result in interventions in the public space, sculptures or installations that undermine or underline this perception of the world.

== Biography ==
From 1992 until 1997 Marc Bijl studied at the Royal Academy of Art & Design in 's-Hertogenbosch. In 1996 he studied for a year at Glasgow School of Art. In his early work Marc Bijl reacted to global themes and to popular fascination with symbols of political power, globalization of the economy, religion and nationalism. This resulted in interventions in public space, videos, sculptures and installations that underscored or undermined world views. Bijl endeavours to expose superficialities and myths via his work. Bijl switches in his work between political activity and street culture as he does between the media of image, text and music. He exposes the superficialities, icons and myths of popular culture in his work to stimulate the spectator to contemplate about moral and ethical issues. The symbol, the logo and the label are his potential targets and his artistic tools. He likes to upset, relocate and re-connote their superficial image and their mythmaking – always aiming at a critical analysis of the social conditions of the society. Bijl employs visual elements borrowed from punk and Gothic subcultures and from anarchism. His early works are representational, cartoon-like and often textual. His recent work is more abstract and minimalistic, exemplifying a shift in approach, by which he pares down different perspectives and methodologies to a new essence. The crux is no longer the 'symbolism' but what that symbolism represents and signifies. In these most recent works Bijl makes clear references to modernist art-historical icons such as Mark Rothko, Mondriaan, De Stijl (Rietveld chair) and more subtle references to Jannis Kounellis and Joseph Beuys. Bijl adapts these classical works to his own corporate style. He seeks a more abstract formal language that is in many respects more ambiguous than his earlier vocabulary.

Bijl undermines systems but at the same time he is depended on these systems. Bijl's work is often rebellious and tends to the illegality. His work is clearly rooted in street culture and possesses elements of graffiti, performance and installation art.

== Works ==
As said earlier the symbols and logos are often the Leitmotiv in Bijls work. In 2000 when the European Football Championship was hosted by the Netherlands and Belgium, Bijl set up a gallery/shop in Rotterdam selling orange color coated bricks endued with the Nike slogan Just do it for the "potentially violent hooligan" to bring the championship into discredit with the help of the official sponsor.

The work La revoluzione siamo noi (2002) shows Bijls fascination with popular culture. The work is a lifelike sculpture of the famous icon Lara Croft. She is covered in tar, holding two pistols and smoking a cigarette. With this black dripping compound she had to give up her vivid youthfulness and sex appeal and turned into a scary mutant-like appearance. On the wall behind her is sprayed La revoluzione siamo noi (We are the revolution), the famous slogan which Joseph Beuys often used in his artworks. Like the Nike Logo, the heroine of the computer game Tomb Raider is a prominent icon in Bijl's work.

Bijl's textual installations take an important place in his oeuvre. In these installations he sprays with graffiti short messages on places in the public space. In 2002 he sprayed RESIST on the entrance to the exhibition space Portikus in Frankfurt am Main. During Documenta 11 in September 2002 het sprayed te words TERROR on each of the six columns of the entrance to the Museum Fridericianum in Kassel. The very next morning all the letters were gone and the audience – still shocked from September 11, 2001 – could visit the exhibition without worrying. In January 2009 he sprayed the words MODERN CRISIS on the same entrance to the Fridericianum. Bijl also posted his name on the hoardings of prominent building sites, mimicking the corporate identity of the hoardings concerned, he was following the strategy of the corporate players who appropriate the realm. He surfed on their strategies and demanded his place within the economic and urban-planning establishment.

In 2002 Bijl made a fake edition of the art magazine Flash Art. With this he reacted on the art system using that systems own rules. In bookshops his artist's book was hardly distinguishable from an actual edition of Flash Art.

In recent works Bijl refers to Rietveld's famous zigzag chair, but unlike Rietveld's colored chair Bijl makes the chair unattractive, covering it with a thick layer of tar. He also relates to the geometrical language of shapes of Piet Mondrian. When abstraction was supposed to lead Mondrian to the "nature of all things", Bijl rather sees the actual social wish for structure and orderliness in it.

== Collections ==
- Kunstmuseum Stuttgart, Germany
- Museo de Arte Contemporáneo de Castilla y León, Spain
- Stedelijk Museum Amsterdam, Netherlands
- Groninger Museum, Netherlands
- Gemeentemuseum Den Haag, Netherlands
- Rabobank, Netherlands
- HVCCA New York City, United States
- KPN Collection, Netherlands
- Frac Nord-Pas de Calais, France
- KRC Collection, Netherlands

== Awards ==
- 2008 Theo Wolvecamp Prize
- 2004 Charlotte Köhler Prize

== Solo exhibitions (selection) ==
2018

- After Dark, Galerie Reinhard Hauff, Stuttgart

2017

- Zeitgeist, Upstream Gallery, Amsterdam

2016

  1. tags, Spinello Projects, Miami, FL (US)
- Blurry Conflicts, Buro Groningen, NL

2015

- Family Man, Kunstverein Heppenheim, Germany

2014

- Solo Booth Armory Show, New York under auspicien of Upstream Gallery Amsterdam, the Netherlands
- The Order of The Black Opaque, Plaatsmaken Arnhem, The Netherlands

2012

- Urban Gothic, Groninger Museum, Groningen, The Netherlands (cat.)
- Light and Shadow, Gallery, Upstream Amsterdam, the Netherlands
- Never trust a rebel, Galerie Reinhard Hauff, Stuttgart, Germany

2010

- 9/11 666 777, Upstream Gallery, Amsterdam, the Netherlands&
- Bite The Beef, Kunstverein Artitude, Berlin, Germany

2009

- ArtBaselMiami under auspicien of The Breeder Athens, Miami, USA
- The simple complexity of it all, Kunsthalle Fridericianum, Kassel, Germany curated by

Rein Wolfs

- Towards our new construction, Rental Gallery with The Breeder, Cologne, Germany
- Arrested Development, DA2 Salamanca, Spain (cat.)

2008

- New sites for personal structures, Upstream Gallery, Amsterdam, the Netherlands

2006

- Indy Structures, The Breeder, Athens, Greece (Cat.)
- Afterhours, Cosmic Gallery, Paris, France

2005

- Afterhours, curated by Roel Arkesteijn, Gem Museum, The Hague, The Netherlands (cat.)
- Get the balance right, Upstream gallery, Amsterdam, the Netherlands

2004

- A passion play, curated by Anouk van Heesch, Museum Valkhof, Nijmegen, The Netherlands
- Chesed / Dien, The Breeder, Athens, Greece
- In times like these, Grafisch Atelier, Utrecht, The Netherlands
- Marc Bijl, Giorgio De Chirico Art Center, Volos, Greece
- The nation had been flirting with forms of götterdämmerung, with extremes of vocabulary and behavior and an appetite for violent resolutions, Casco, Utrecht, The Netherlands
- The world won’t listen, Bergman Designstore/gallery Frankfurt, Germany curated by Nicolaus Schafhausen
- Black Planet, Magazin 4, Bregenz, Austria curated by Judith Reichart
