= Phemia Molkenboer =

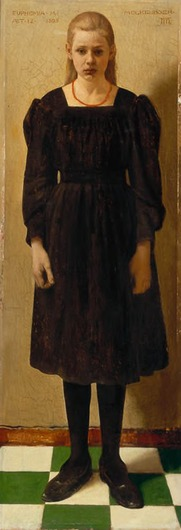
Phemia at age 12, painted by her brother Theo

Euphemia Hendrika Maria (Phemia) Molkenboer (Weesp, 10 September 1883 – Amsterdam, 10 May 1940) was a Dutch ceramist, furniture designer, draughtswoman and art teacher.

== Biography ==
Molkenboer was born in Weesp in 1883, one of fourteen children of the sculptor and painter Willem Molkenboer and Maria Cecilia Petronella Johanna Derkinderen. She was a sister of the painters Antoon Molkenboer and Theo Molkenboer and of the literary scientist Bernard Molkenboer.

She attended the Rijksnormaalschool voor Teekenonderwijzers, an art school founded by her father, from 1900 to 1905, followed by a year at the Rijksakademie art school. She became an art teacher and worked as one at least until 1930. Between 1916 and 1920 she was involved with the magazine Jong Leven and she became a member and later secretary of the catholic art society Kunstkring de Violier in Amsterdam.

== Works ==
In 1907 Molkenboer produced drawings for a book by Johanna Naber, followed by some book covers, mostly in Art Nouveau style. She worked with the toy factory Olanda, designing wooden toys and children's furniture. In 1924, at the occasion of the 27th Eucharistic Congress, Molkenboer designed commemorative plates for De Koninklijke Porceleyne Fles in Delft. She also did some occasion work for the earthenware factory De Sphinx in Maastricht. Some of Molkenboer's work was distinguished at the Panama–California Exposition in San Diego.

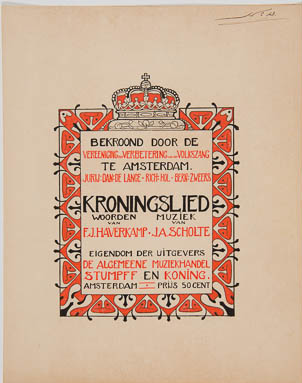
Sheet music cover, 1898 coronation song

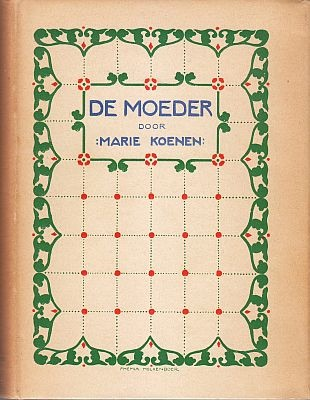
Book cover for Marie Koenen, 1938

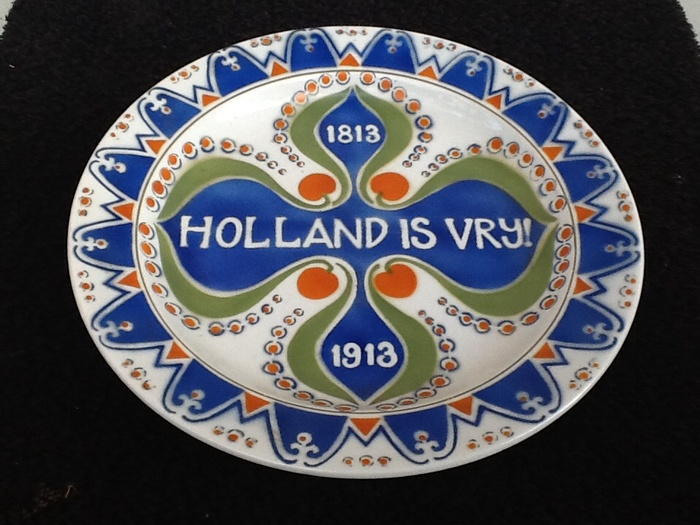
Memorial plate, Kingdom of the Netherlands 100 years, 1913

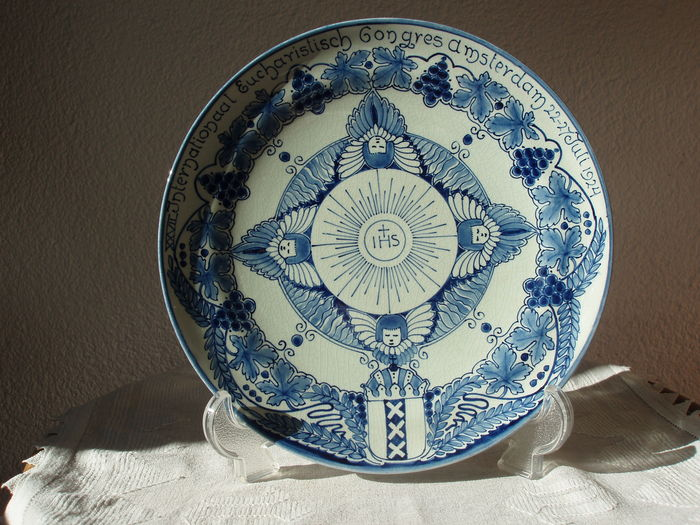
Memorial plate for the 27th Eucharistic Congress, Amsterdam, 22–27 July 1924
