= Royal Academy of Arts and Design ('s-Hertogenbosch) =

Former art school in 's-Hertogenbosch, Netherlands

- Koninklijke Academie voor Kunst en Vormgeving
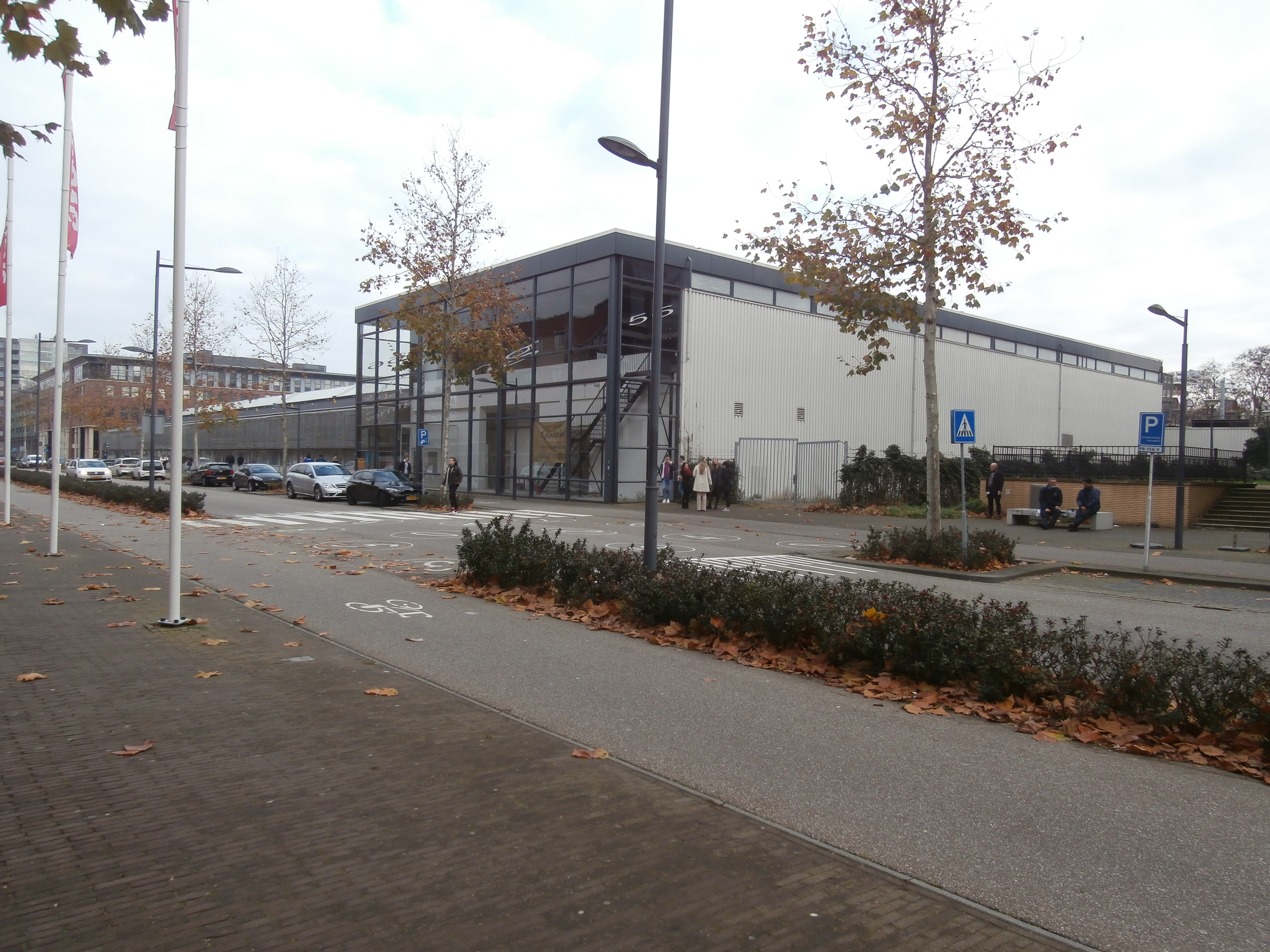
- Former building of the art academy in 's-Hertogenbosch in 2020
- 's-Hertogenbosch; Netherlands

Information
- Established: 1812
- Closed: 2004 merged to become AKV St. Joost

The Royal Academy of Arts and Design was an academy for art education in 's-Hertogenbosch. In 2004 it merged with the Art Academy St. Joost from Breda to become the Academy of Art and Design St. Joost located in both Breda and 's-Hertogenbosch.

== Names ==
From 1812 to 2004 the Art Academy was known under multiple names

Académie impériale et royale de peinture, sculpture et architecture (1812)
Stads Academie voor Teeken- en Schilderkunst (1814)
Koninklijke School voor Nuttige en Beeldende Kunsten (1828)
Koninklijke School voor Kunst, Techniek en Ambacht (1918)
Koninklijke Academie voor Kunst en Vormgeving (1957)

== Académie Impériale et Royale ==
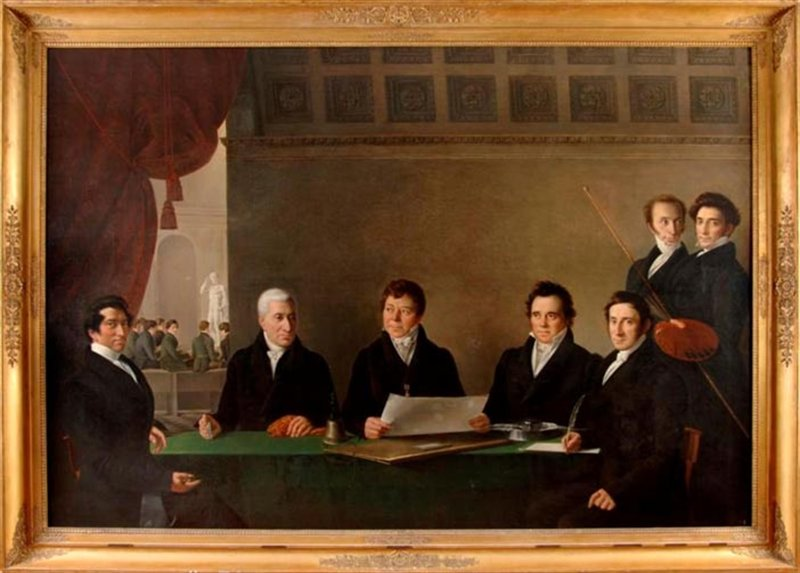
The board of 1812

The Art Academy was founded in 's-Hertogenbosch in 1812. At the time 's-Hertogenbosch was part of the French Empire of Napoleon Bonaparte since March 1810. In 1811 mayor mr. A.G. Verheijen proposed the foundation of a drawing academy Stads teekenacademie to the city council. The first board of 1812 was painted by D.F. du Bois in 1828. He also included himself and Pieter Barbiers in the corner. From left to right the painting shows: P.J. Zuthere, B.J. Deckers, Mayor A.G. Verheijen, deputy-Mayor G.M. van de Ven.

1,500 French Francs were added to the 1812 budget for: 'An institute as useful as pleasant for the youth that wants to dedicate themselves to these subjects, that require drawing' Een instituut zoo nuttig als aangenaam voor onderscheidene jongelieden welke zich aan vakken willen toewijden, waarbij de teekenkunst noodzakelijk is. The board wanted to give education in all fields of artisanry and industry that required skilled laborers. This was free of charge, and meant for the poor. Next to that it wanted to rekindle the arts of drawing and painting in the city, which had all but disappeared.

In October 1812 the first course started with 15 students. The first manager directeur was Geard van Dinter, Joseph Weingärtner was his deputyprofesseur en second. Teaching took place in the city poor school in the Wolfenhoek. Here an attic had been readied for the school. During the first year, the municipality invested about 400 Francs in (inanimate) models, and spent about 500 Francs on furniture and all kinds of daily and small expenses. This was not enough, and so Van Dinther applied to the inhabitants to sponsor the school for six Francs a year, in return for which, they could propose a student. 92 inhabitants agreed, and so the capabilities of the school were increased. The first year was concluded with an exposition in the former theater in Orthen street. An exposition of paintings was new to 's-Hertogenbosch, and so the event drew a large crowd. In the second year 50 students started at the school. During this school year the French were evicted from 's-Hertogenbosch.

== Stads Academie voor Teeken- en Schilderkunst ==
The departure of French soldiers and public servants decreased the number of supporters of the academy to 80. On the other hand, the city increased its contribution to 1,200 guilders, and appointed a third teacher: J.G. Walger for construction and geometry. The school was then renamed 'Stads Academie voor Teeken- en Schilderkunst'. While education of the poor was an official mission of the school, the sponsor system caused that many sons of somewhat better off parents entered the school. Lessons were given on weekdays from 6 to 8 in the evening. With an interruption Van Dinther was president till his death in 1820.

In 1820 the school got its own building, bought for 3,000 guilders. That year 24 students of construction, 36 of drawing and 12 in drawing to antique models started. By 1821 there were 150 students in four classrooms. That year Van Dinther was succeeded by Henricus Turken and Antoine van Bedaff. In 1822 these men published a school book: Grondbeginselen der Teekenkunst, in fragmenten naar de antieken. In 1822 P.J. Zutter became city architect of 's-Hertogenbosch, and architecture teacher at a salary of 200 guilders.

In 1825 a plan was made to turn the academy into a Provincial Academy for Visual Arts of North Brabant. The idea was that the province would subsidize the school for 1,500 guilders, and that in return, youth from multiple places would have free admission. This would also allow the board to raise the salaries of the teachers. However, the states-provincial of North Brabant did not agree. Turken and Van Bedaff then left the academy in the course year 1825/26. Students from this period were e.g. Willem Verbeet, Jan Hendrik van Grootvelt and Thomas van Leent.

== Royal School ==
=== Becomes a royal school ===
In later January 1826 Dominicus Franciscus du Bois from Bruges and Pieter Barbiers from Kampen succeeded as drawing teachers at the academy. They had to compete for the director position in a drawing competition, which Dubois won. The municipality then requested the king to bestow the title `Royal Academy of Visual Arts' on the school in 1827, and to bestow a yearly subsidy. This request failed, because there were already two royal academies in the Netherlands, one in Antwerp, and one in Amsterdam.

The request was successful in the sense that in 1828 the school became a 'Royal School for Applied and Visual arts', and was promised a yearly subsidy of 1,500 guilders for six years. The order determined that the school would have one class that prepared artists for the Amsterdam and Antwerp academies. This class would practice drawing and sculpting after live and inanimate models. In general, the school would offer lessons in:

- Drawing
- Mathematics and Descriptive Geometry
- Drawing in perspective
- The orders of architecture and the foundations of ornament
- Architecture

As soon as circumstances allowed this was to be expanded to:

- Foundations of Physics and Chemistry as applied to industry
- Theoretical knowledge of machines, their power, operation and use

=== An art school? ===
The expansion of the school after it became 'royal' again shows its hybrid character and how much the contemporary notion of art and artisanship, differs from the 21st century meaning of these words. The school was expanded by appointing more teachers. G.N. Itz was appointed as second teacher in architecture. A.F. van den Dries became pro deo teacher in applied Physics and Chemistry. R.W. van Opveld became teacher in Mathematics and Descriptive Geometry for 200 guilders a year. The salaries of the director and drawing teacher were raised to 600 and 400 guilders. That of the city architect and first teacher in architecture (Zutter) became 300 guilders. R.W. van Opveld was also vice-president of the Latin School of 's-Hertogenbosch.

Just how much the school differed from the later art academy was shown again later on. In 1832 it got a music department for singing and teaching the use musical instruments. This music department became independent again in 1847, and then disappeared. In 1833 20 aspiring artillery officers were admitted to the school, because they could not study at the military academy. Many of these would later make a successful career in the army. The board of the school also noted that in winter many youngsters and artisans like, gold- and silver- and coppersmiths, as well as sheet metal workers, masons, furniture workers and the like stayed in town for the express purpose of following the lessons.

Meanwhile, in May 1830 the board of the school had proposed to renovate and expand its building according to a design made by Zutter and Itz for 6,000 guilders. The famous sculptor and ex-student Johannes Antonius van der Ven made two reliefs for the building. In 1831 the new building was finished and the 1831-32 course had opened with 300 students. In 1832 G.N. Itz had become city architect of Dordrecht, and had been succeeded by J.H. Laffertee. In 1850-52 the school building was significantly expanded again. It allowed the school to host a big exposition in 1854.

=== The 1854 exposition ===
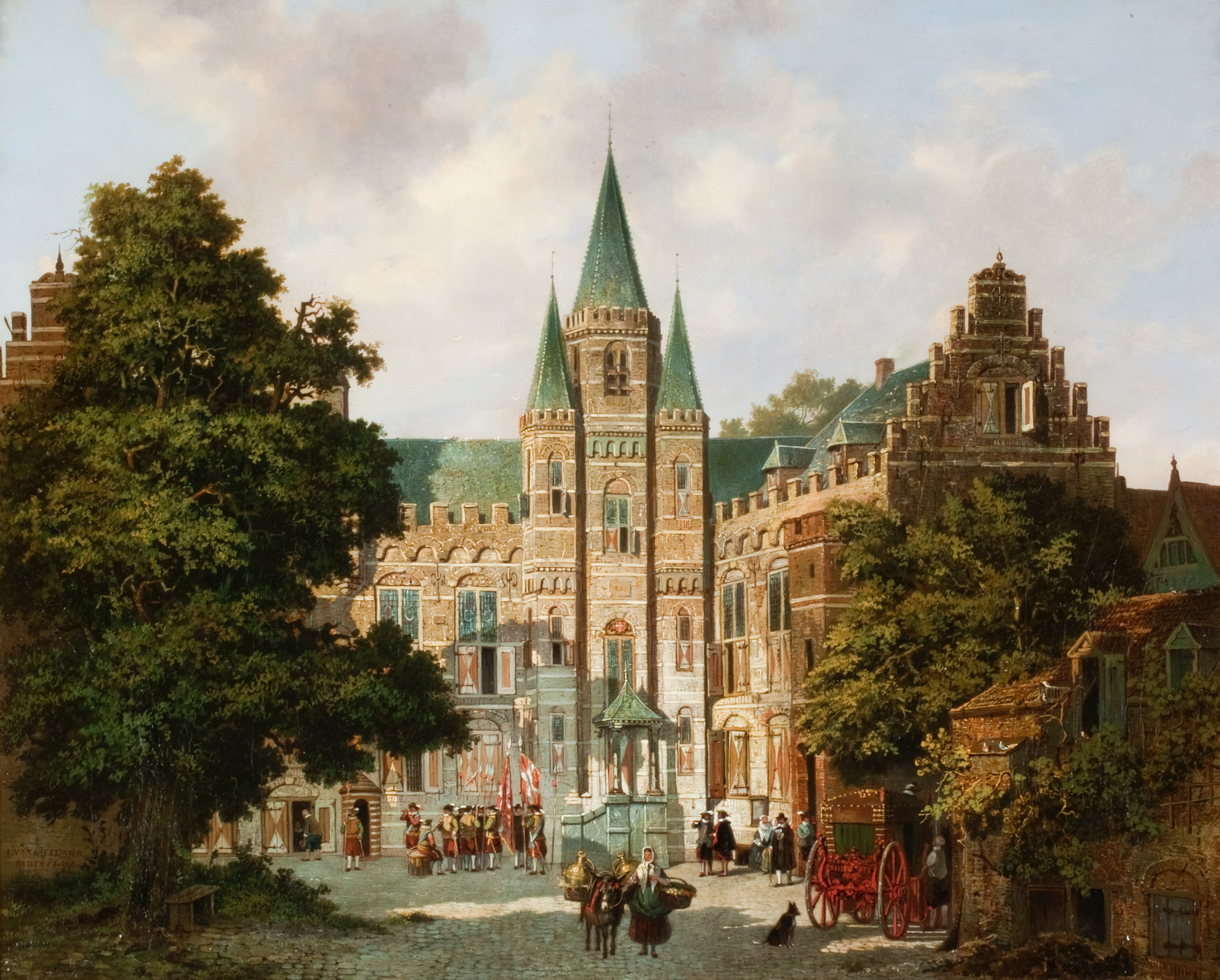
The Bishop of Utrecht's court by Van Liefland, part of the 1854 exposition

In 1854 the school successfully organized the first art exposition in 's-Hertogenbosch that was comparable to those hosted in the big cities of the Netherlands. The first plans for this exposition were revealed in October 1853. It was then planned to start in early July 1854. In December 1853 it was re-planned to open on 16 October and to close down on 11 November next. An exposition in Amsterdam that would also show many of the foreign masters planned for 's-Hertogenbosch was then extended, and so the exposition in 's-Hertogenbosch was again rescheduled to open on 6 November.

The exposition showed 530 works by national and foreign artists. Many of the most prominent contemporary Dutch, Belgian and German masters were represented. On the other hand, the inclusion of part of the local artists met with criticism. The scale and ambition of the exposition were unheard of for the city and province. For the first time since 1629 's-Hertogenbosch was a significant player in the arts on the national level.

The national newspapers wrote about art in 's-Hertogenbosch. The Algemeen Handelsblad covered the exposition in multiple parts. It allows a rather precise reconstruction of not only the content of this exposition, but also of the way the public appreciated it. A side effect of the exposition was that it allowed local students to get first hand acquaintance with what contemporary artists produced.

The school was allowed to hold a lottery to defray part of the cost. The prizes were 30 named paintings. This was also a way to motivate artists to participate, because it meant that 10% of the exposed works were sold before the exposition even started.

== Royal School for Art, Technique and Artisanship ==
=== A new school ===
In 1918 the Royal School for Applied and Visual arts became the Royal School for Art, Technique and Artisanship Koninklijke School voor Kunst, Techniek en Ambacht (KTA). It was to provide vocational education for all craftsmen; technical education for overseers and managers; and to give males and females an opportunity to study the arts of drawing, painting and sculpting. It was to be in the center of the industrial revival of the south. In a practical sense it meant a merger between: the royal school, the municipal vocational school of 1877, the MTS (below) and the art education part of the royal school.

=== 1919 the first Technical School of the south ===
In 1919 the art school started the first technical school Middelbare Technische School (MTS), a form of vocational education of the southern provinces of the Netherlands. This started as an evening school, later on it became a full time course. The MTS taught architecture, road construction and hydraulic engineering. Later on this was expanded to mechanical engineering and electrical engineering. This followed a national pattern, where comparable technical schools were established by the art schools of The Hague and Rotterdam, and later on by Academie Minerva in Groningen.

=== Great building at Koopmansplein ===
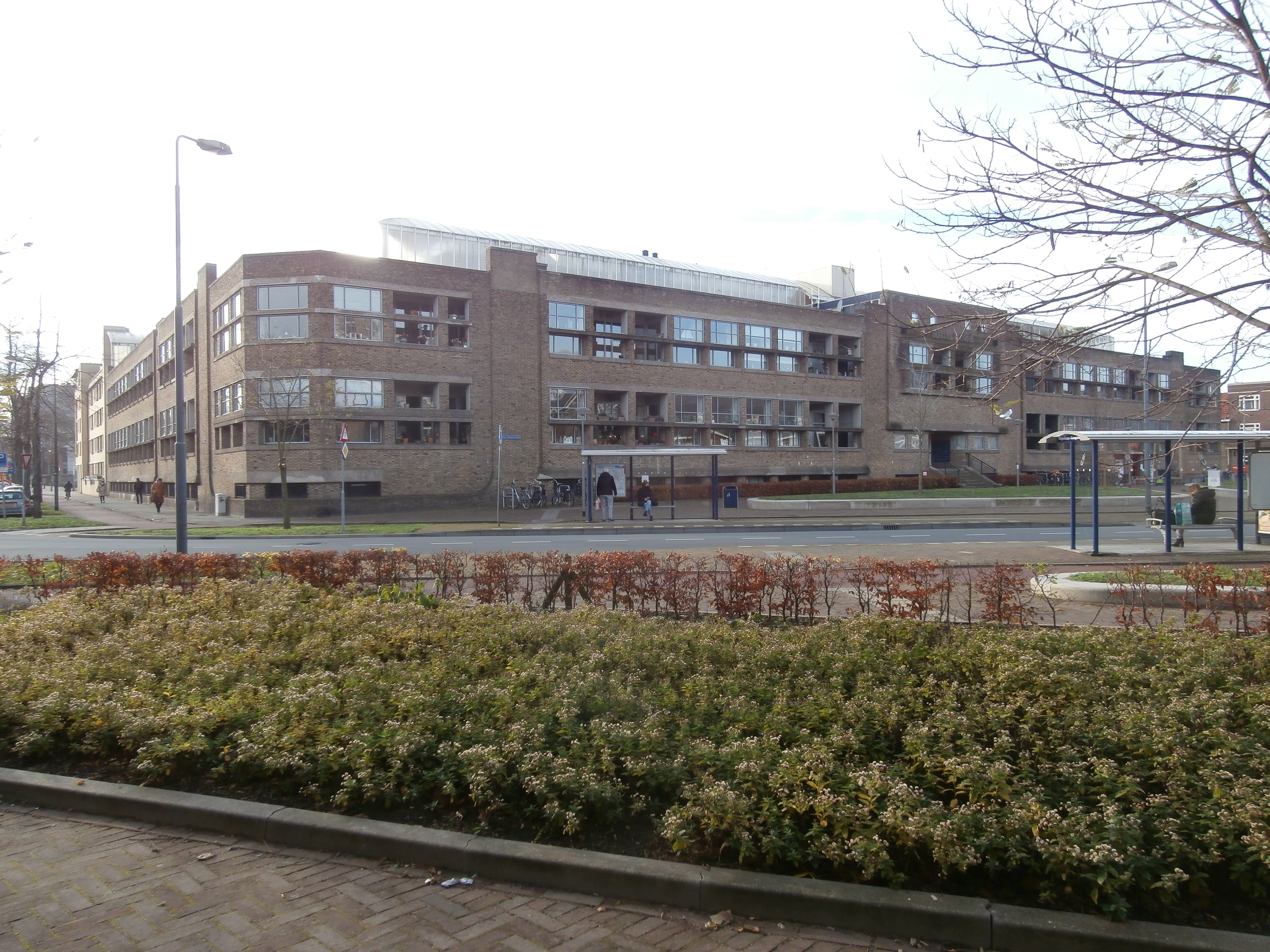
The 1927 school building

In 1927 the KTA got a new building on Kapelaan Koopmansplein, then known as Duhamelplein. It was one of the most impressive buildings of the city and drew national attention. The building was designed by the municipal department of architecture. The front façade was 85 m wide. Both wings ran backwards for 78 m. Construction was done in reinforced concrete and brick.

In the interior, the basement held service quarters. Furthermore, there were two series of classrooms and rooms to teach drawing. There were also rooms for teachers and for the board. Inside the u-form were 12 workplaces of 7 by 16 m. The u was closed in such a way that the building could later be expanded.

As regards art, the building had a leadlight of 15 windows in its stairway building. The leadlight had been designed by former principal Huib Luns, and was made by the atelier of Jean den Rooijen in Roermond. Former mayor Jonkheer van der Does de Willebois, Baron van Voorst tot Voorst, and mayor mr. van Lanschot paid for it. One of the teachers, Piet Slager made a painting of King William I. There was also a handful of other art works.

== Royal Academy ==
=== Royal Academy for Art and Design ===
In the early 1950s, students could go to the MTS as part of the Koninklijke School voor Kunst, Techniek en Ambacht. This was in the building on Kapelaan Koopmansplein. In 1955 the vocational school LTS Lagere Technische School, got its own building on the Sportlaan in the western part of the city. The art department became the Koninklijke School voor Kunst en Kunstnijverheid (art and applied arts), and got its own building on the Pettelaarseweg in February 1953. In 1957 the school became known as Royal Academy for Art and Design Koninklijke Academie voor Kunst en Vormgeving.

=== Merged into Avans vocational university ===
On 1 August 1987 the Art Academy became part of the Hogeschool 's-Hertogenbosch. This was a merger of the Art Academy, multiple technical schools, and the Catholic Social Academy. On 1 January 2004 this became known as Avans Hogeschool den Bosch. In 2011 this merged with Avans Hogeschool Breda to become Avans Hogeschool, a vocational university.

=== Moves to the Remington factory ===
In 1988 the academy left the building on the Pettelaarseweg, which was subsequently demolished. The next location was the former Remington Rand typewriter factory on the Sportlaan, now Onderwijsboulevard. This building was very suitable, because it was designed to let in a lot of natural light.

=== Academy St. Joost ===
The 2004 merger into Avans also entailed a merger between the Academy for Visual Arts Sint-Joost Academie voor Beeldende Kunsten Sint-Joost in Breda, and the Royal Academy for Art and Design. The new name became Academy of Art and Design St. Joost Akademie voor Kunst en Vormgeving St. Joost, without the label 'Royal'.

== Notable staff and students ==
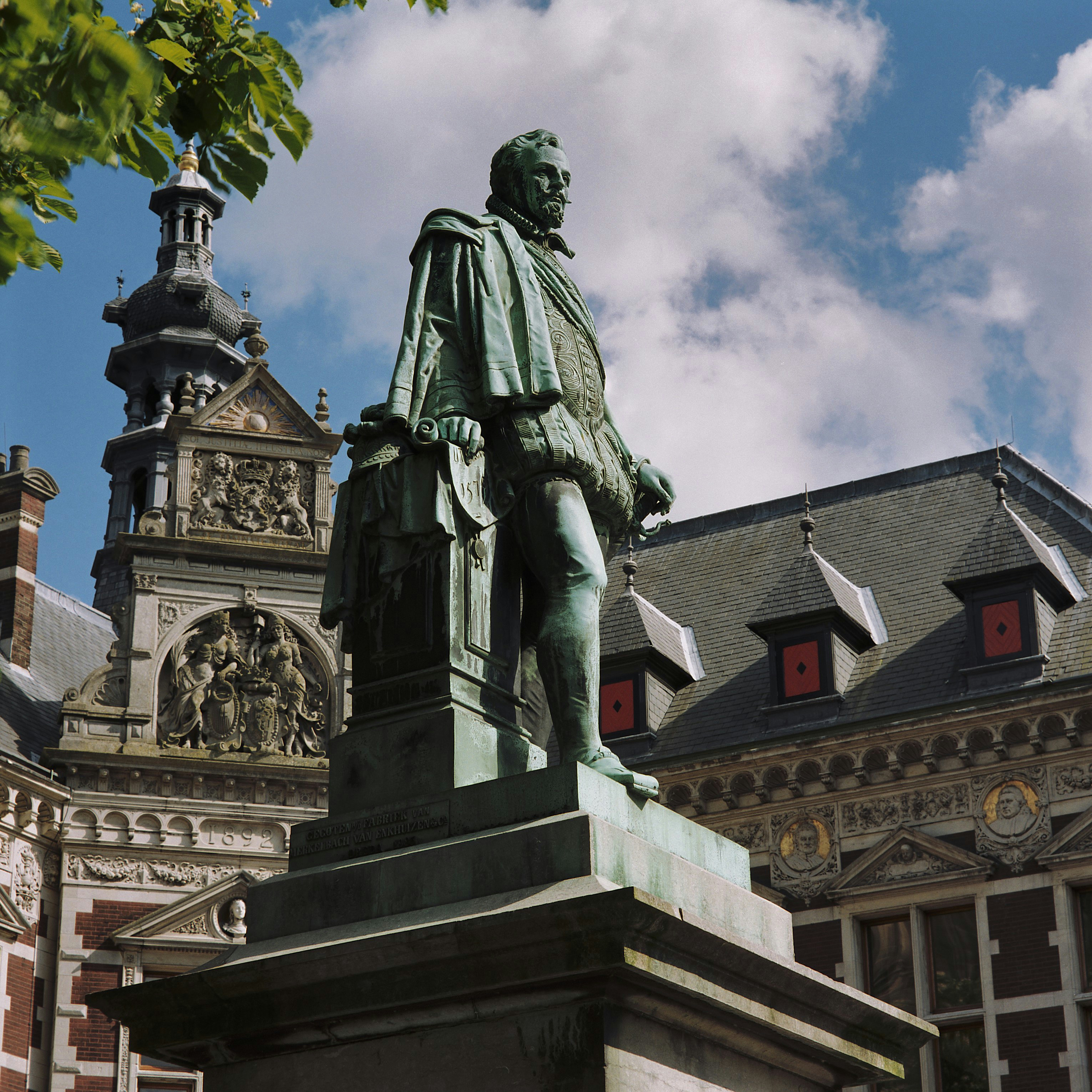
Jan van Nassau by Stracké

Students

- Antoon Derkinderen
- Lambert Hezenmans
- Thomas van Leent
- Piet Slager Sr.
- Willem Verbeet
- Marc Bijl

Staff

- Gerard van Dinter (Principal 1812)
- Henricus Turken (Principal 1821)
- Antoon van Bedaff
- Dominicus Franciscus du Bois (Principal 1826–1840)
- Pieter Barbiers
- Johannes Antonius van der Ven (Principal 1853)
- Jean Theodore Stracké (Principal 1876 - 1891)
- Huib Luns (Principal 1917)
