= Joseph Luns =

Dutch politician and diplomat (1911–2002)

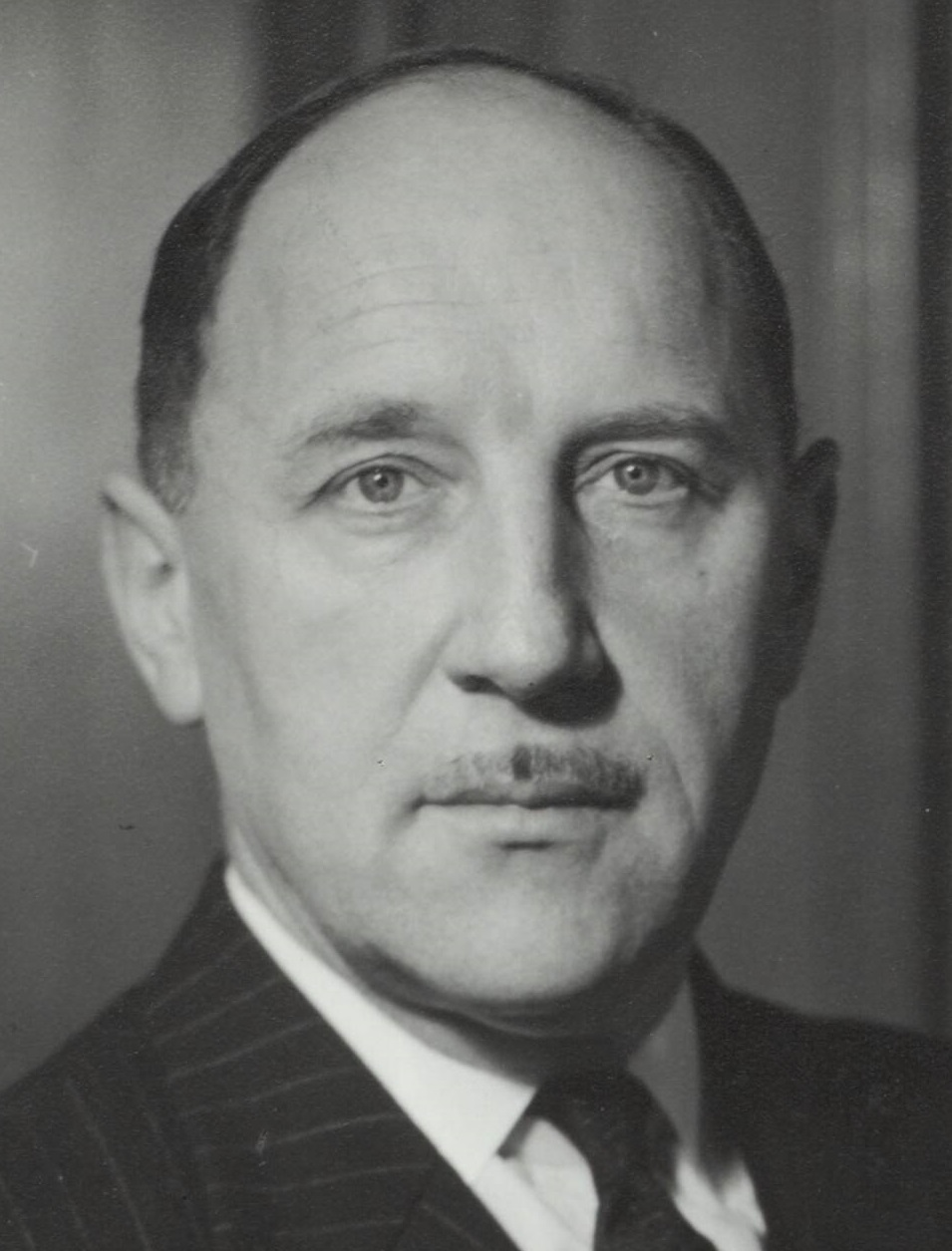
- Luns in 1956

5th Secretary General of NATO
- In office 1 October 1971 – 25 June 1984
- Preceded by: Manlio Brosio
- Succeeded by: The Lord Carrington

Minister of Foreign Affairs
- In office 13 October 1956 – 6 July 1971
- Prime Minister: See list: Willem Drees (1956–1958) Louis Beel (1958–1959) Jan de Quay (1959–1963) Victor Marijnen (1963–1965) Jo Cals (1965–1966) Jelle Zijlstra (1966–1967) Piet de Jong (1967–1971)
- Preceded by: Johan Beyen
- Succeeded by: Norbert Schmelzer

Member of the House of Representatives
- In office 11 May 1971 – 1 October 1971
- In office 23 February 1967 – 5 April 1967
- In office 3 July 1956 – 3 October 1956

Minister for Foreign Policy
- In office 2 September 1952 – 13 October 1956
- Prime Minister: Willem Drees
- Preceded by: Eelco van Kleffens (1947)
- Succeeded by: Office abolished

Personal details
- Born: Joseph Antoine Marie Hubert Luns (Note: In 1929 he legally changed his name from Joseph Antoine Marie Hubert Luns to Joseph Marie Antoine Hubert Luns.); 28 August 1911 Rotterdam, Netherlands
- Died: 17 July 2002 (aged 90) Brussels, Belgium
- Party: Catholic People's Party (1945–1972)
- Other political affiliations: Independent (from 1972)
- Spouse: Baroness Lia van Heemstra (m. 1939; died 1990)
- Relations: Theo Luns (brother)
- Children: 2
- Parent: Huib Luns (father)
- Education: Leiden University; (LLB, LLM); London School of Economics (BEcon)
- Occupation: Politician; diplomat; civil servant; jurist; economist; historian
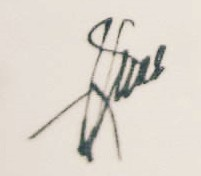
- Signature

Military service
- Branch/service: Royal Netherlands Navy
- Years of service: 1930–1931 (Conscription); 1931–1936 (Reserve)
- Rank: Warrant officer
- Unit: Netherlands Coastguard
- Battles/wars: Cold War

Joseph Marie Antoine Hubert Luns (Dutch: [ˈjoːzəf ˈlʏns]; 28 August 1911 – 17 July 2002) was a Dutch politician, diplomat and jurist who served as the fifth secretary general of NATO from 1971 to 1984, being the longest-serving officeholder since the office was established in 1952. Prior to this, he was Minister of Foreign Affairs, starting in 1956. Luns was a member of the now-defunct Catholic People's Party (KVP), later merged into the Christian Democratic Appeal (CDA).

Luns attended Saint Ignatius Gymnasium in Amsterdam from April 1924 until June 1930. He was conscripted in the Coastguard of the Royal Netherlands Navy serving as a warrant officer from June 1930 until July 1931. He applied at the University of Amsterdam in July 1931 majoring in law before transferring to the Leiden University in November 1932, obtaining a Bachelor of Laws degree in June 1933 and graduating with a Master of Laws degree in July 1937. He applied at the London School of Economics of the University of London in January 1938 for a postgraduate education in economics, obtaining a Bachelor of Economics degree in June 1938.

After joining the diplomatic service, Luns was appointed Minister for Foreign Policy in September 1952, and Minister of Foreign Affairs in October 1956. In September 1971 Luns was nominated as the next Secretary General of NATO. He resigned as a member of the House of Representatives the same day he was installed as secretary general, serving from 1 October 1971 to 25 June 1984.

He retired after 31 years in national politics and became active in the public sector, where he was a diplomat and lobbyist for several economic delegations on behalf of the government and as an advocate for United States–European Union relations and European integration.

== Biography ==
=== Early life ===
Luns was born in a Roman Catholic, Francophile and artistic family. His mother's family originated from Alsace-Lorraine but had moved to Belgium after the annexation of the region by the German Empire in 1871. His father, Huib Luns, was a versatile artist and a gifted educationalist who ended his career as professor of architectural drawing at the Delft University of Technology. Luns received his secondary education in Amsterdam and Brussels. He opted to become a commissioned officer of the Dutch Royal Navy but registered too late to be selected. Therefore, Luns decided to study law at Amsterdam University from 1932 to 1937.

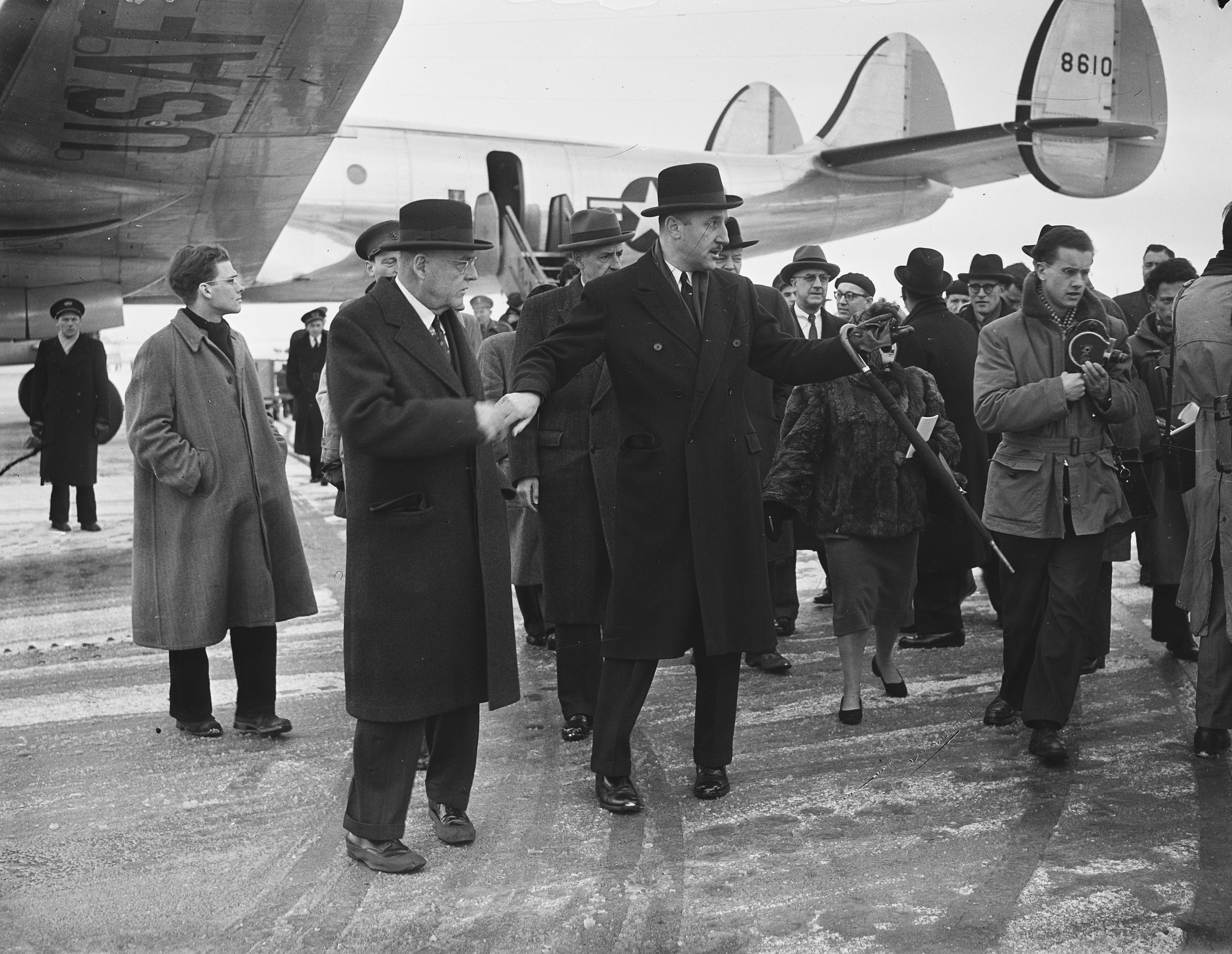
United States Secretary of State John Foster Dulles, Director of the Mutual Security Agency Harold Stassen and Minister for United Nations Affairs Joseph Luns at Airport Schiphol on 6 February 1953

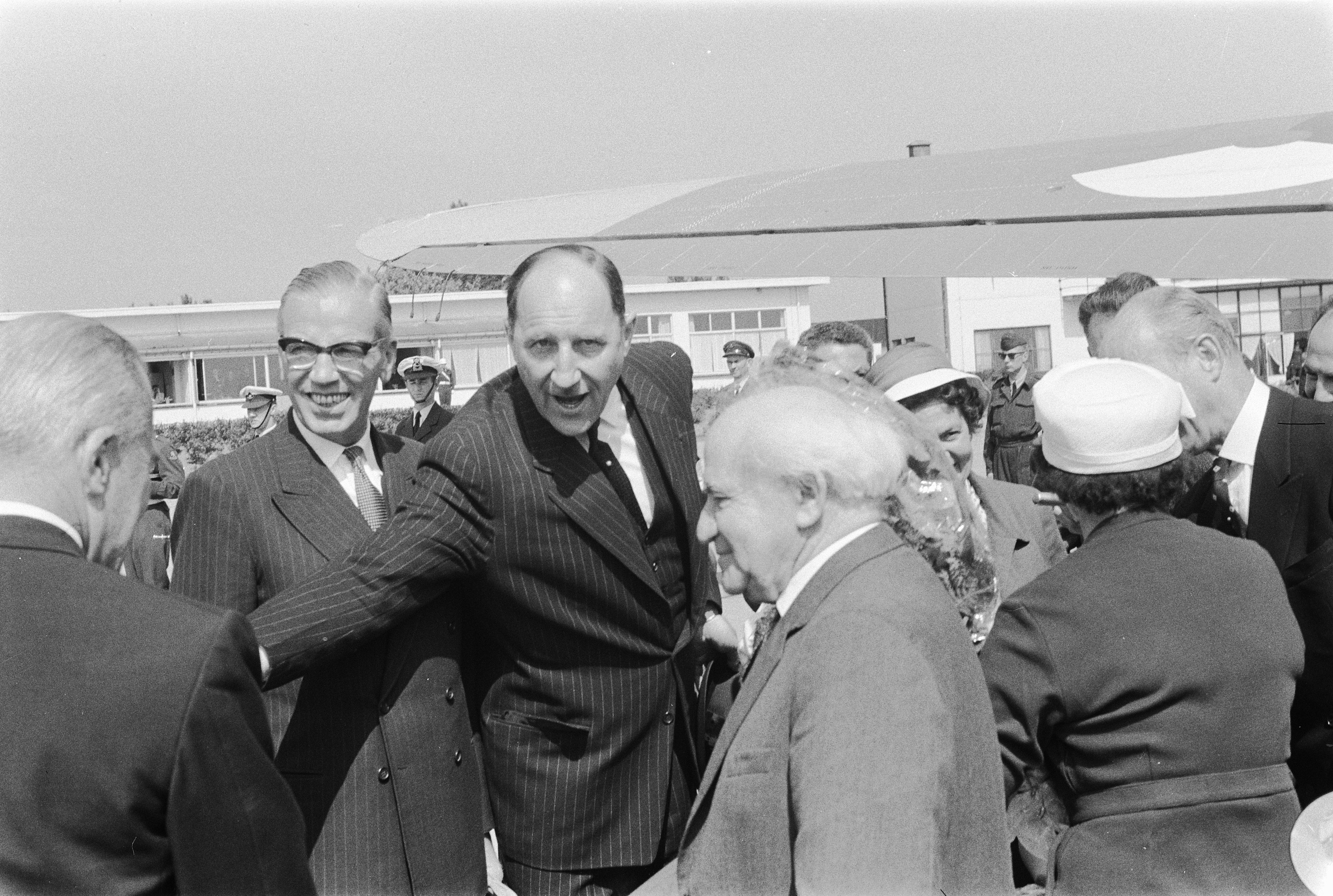
Minister of Justice Albert Beerman, Minister of Foreign Affairs Joseph Luns and Prime Minister of Israel David Ben-Gurion at Ypenburg Airport on 22 June 1960

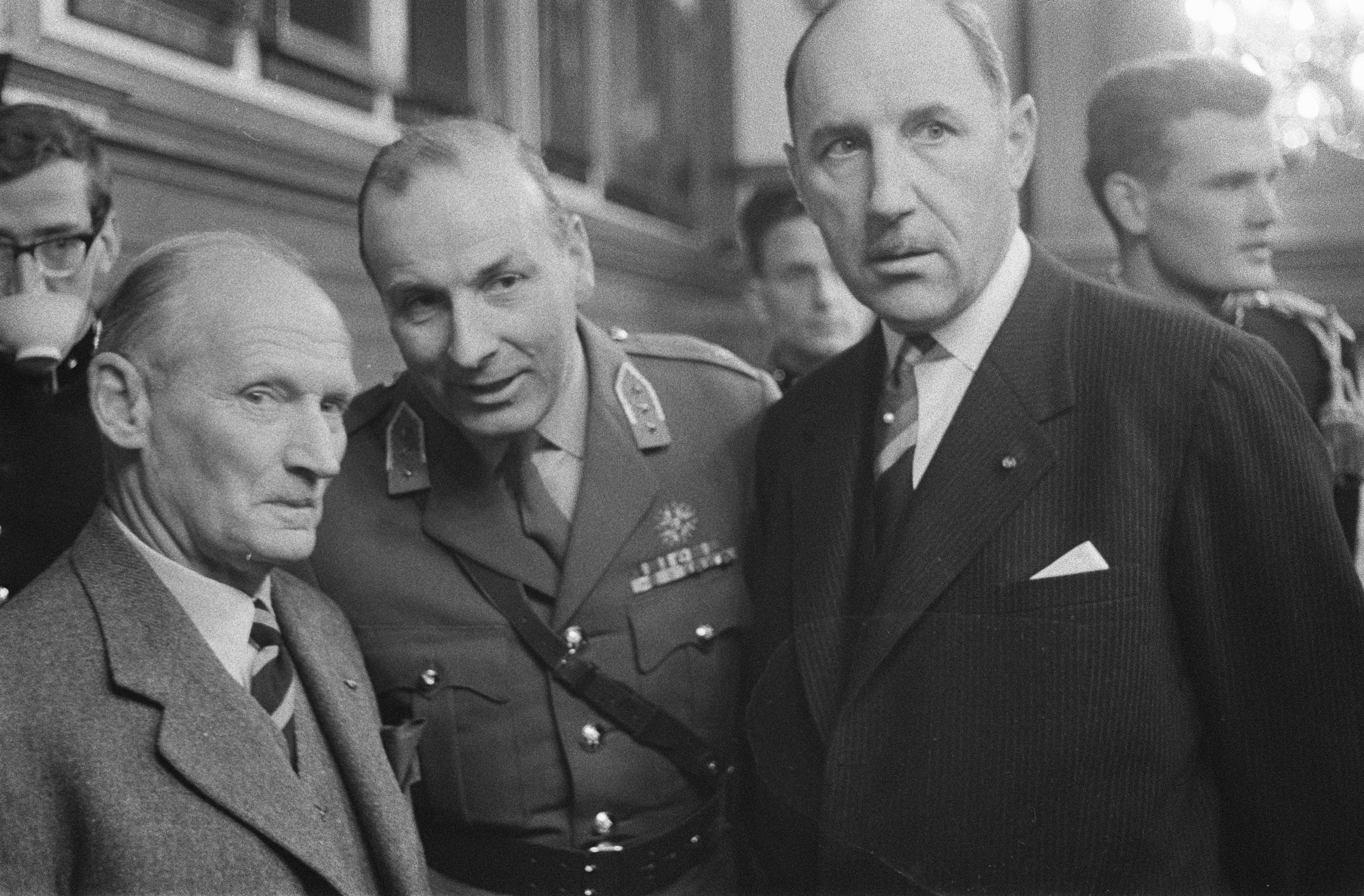
Retired United Kingdom Field marshal Bernard Montgomery and Minister of Foreign Affairs Joseph Luns during a visit at the University of Amsterdam on 9 November 1960

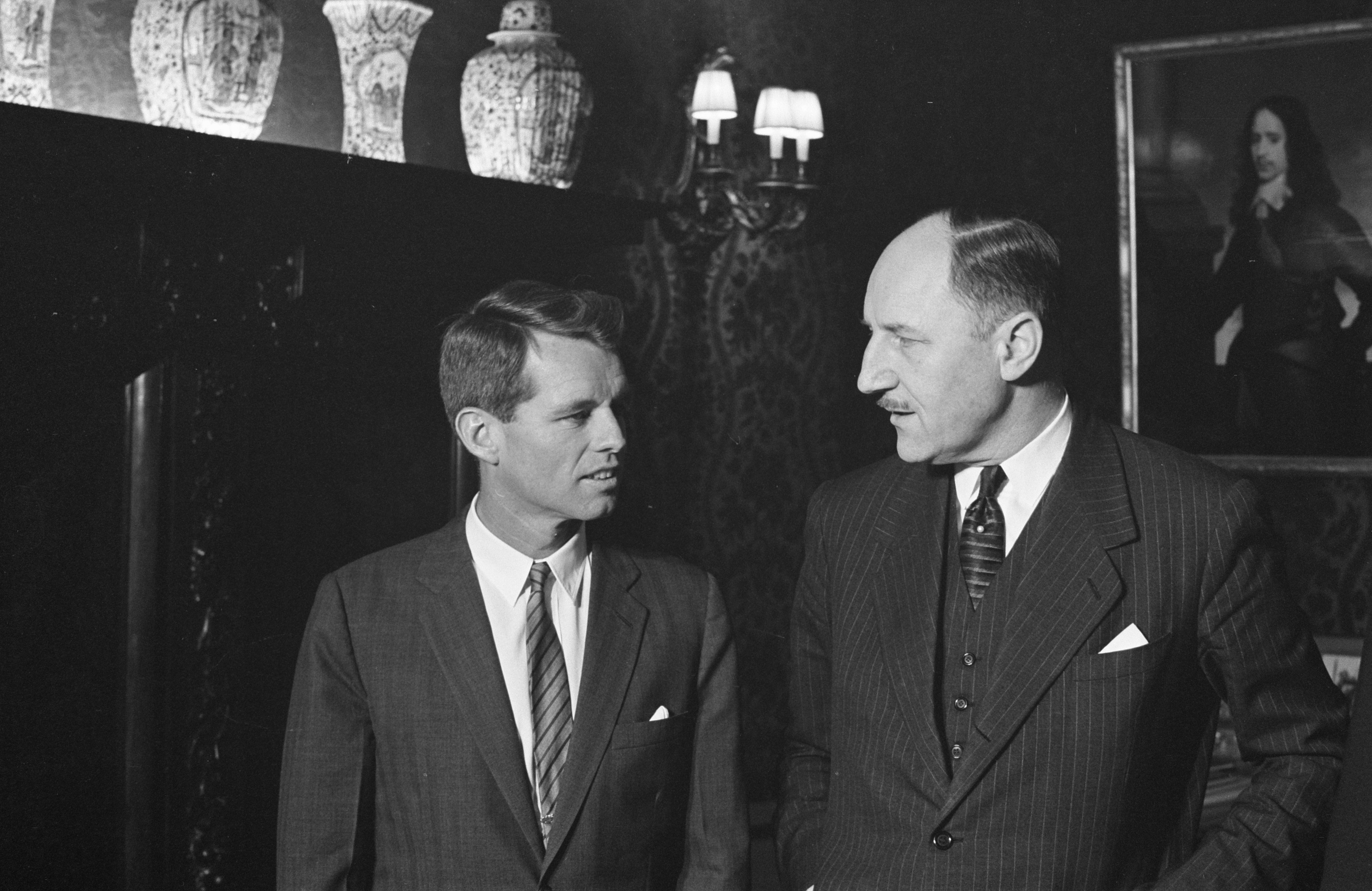
United States Attorney General Robert F. Kennedy and Minister of Foreign Affairs Joseph Luns during a meeting at the Ministry of General Affairs on 26 February 1962

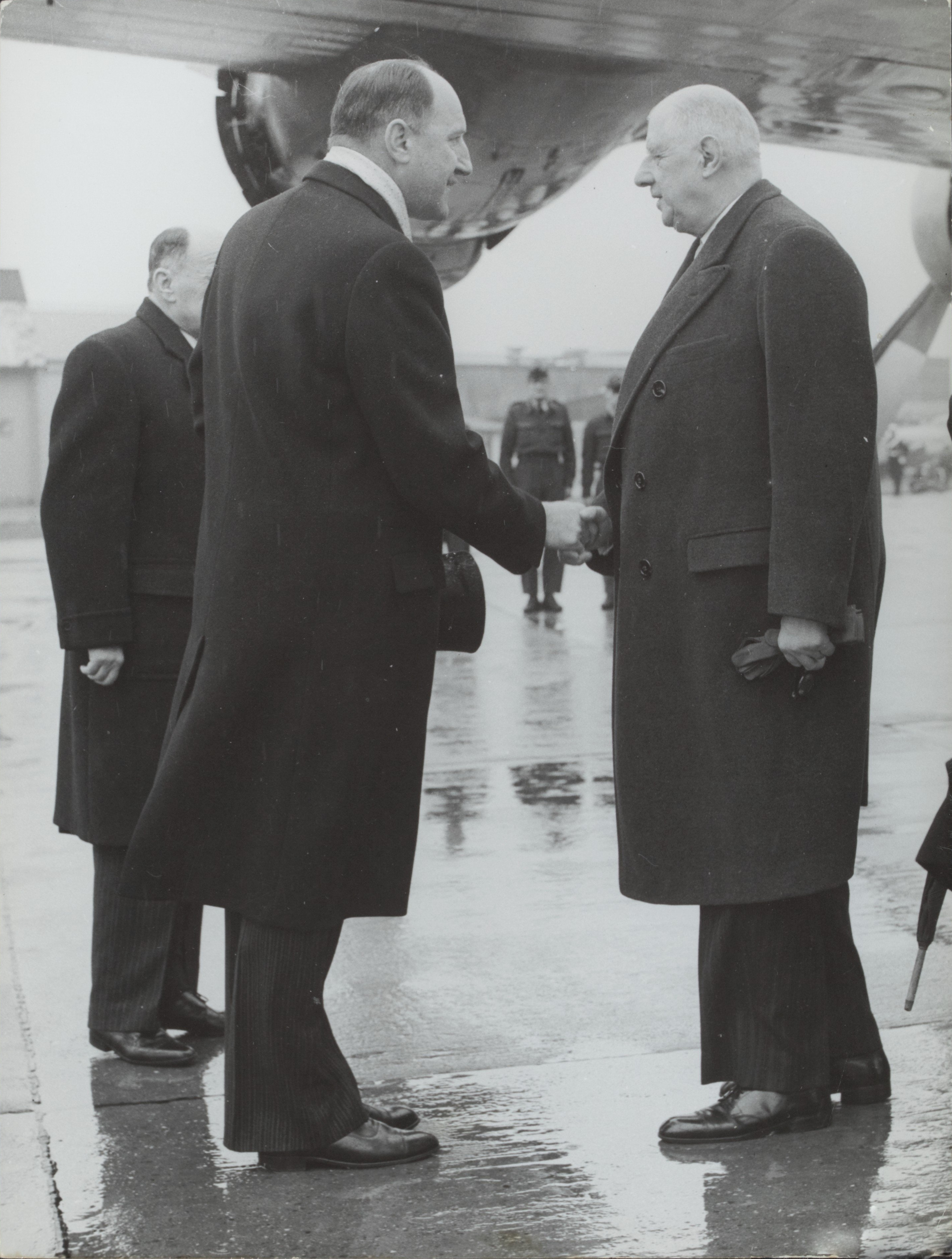
Minister of Foreign Affairs Joseph Luns and President of France Charles de Gaulle at Airport Schiphol on 16 March 1963

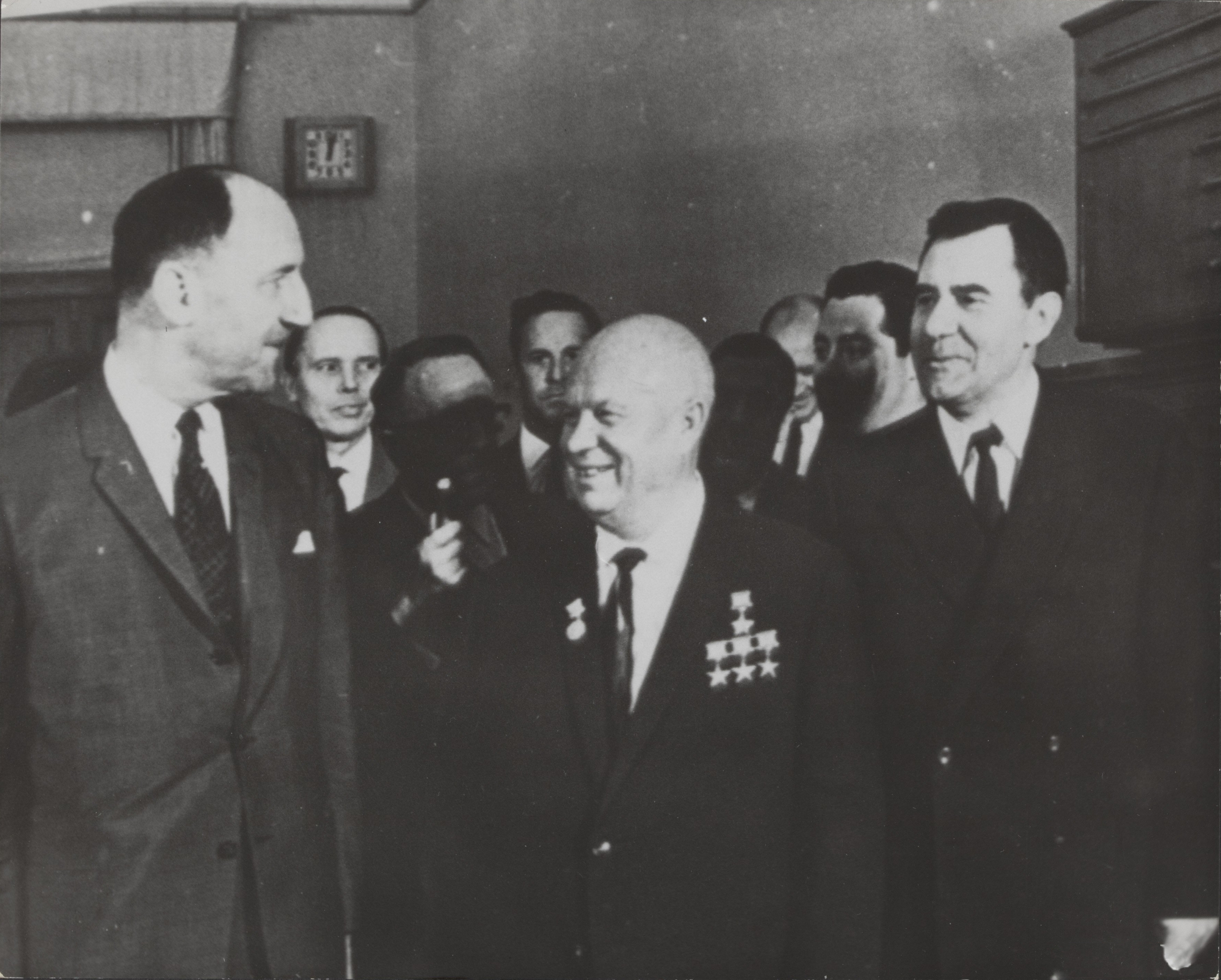
Minister of Foreign Affairs Joseph Luns, First Secretary of the Communist Party of the Soviet Union Nikita Khrushchev and Minister of Foreign Affairs of the Soviet Union Andrei Gromyko during a meeting at the Kremlin Senate on 8 July 1964

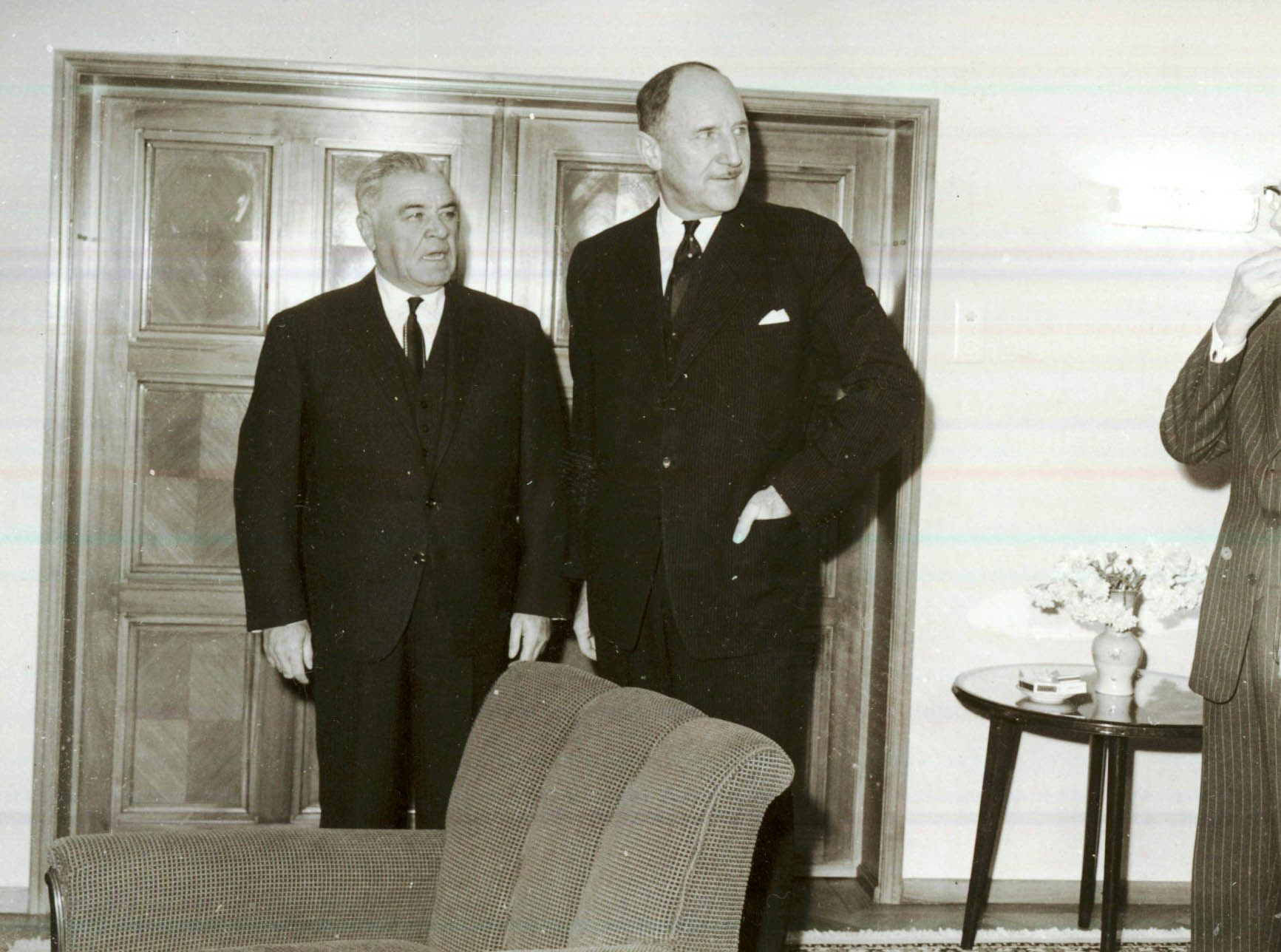
Prime Minister of Romania Ion Gheorghe Maurer and Minister of Foreign Affairs Joseph Luns during a meeting in Bucharest on 13 January 1967

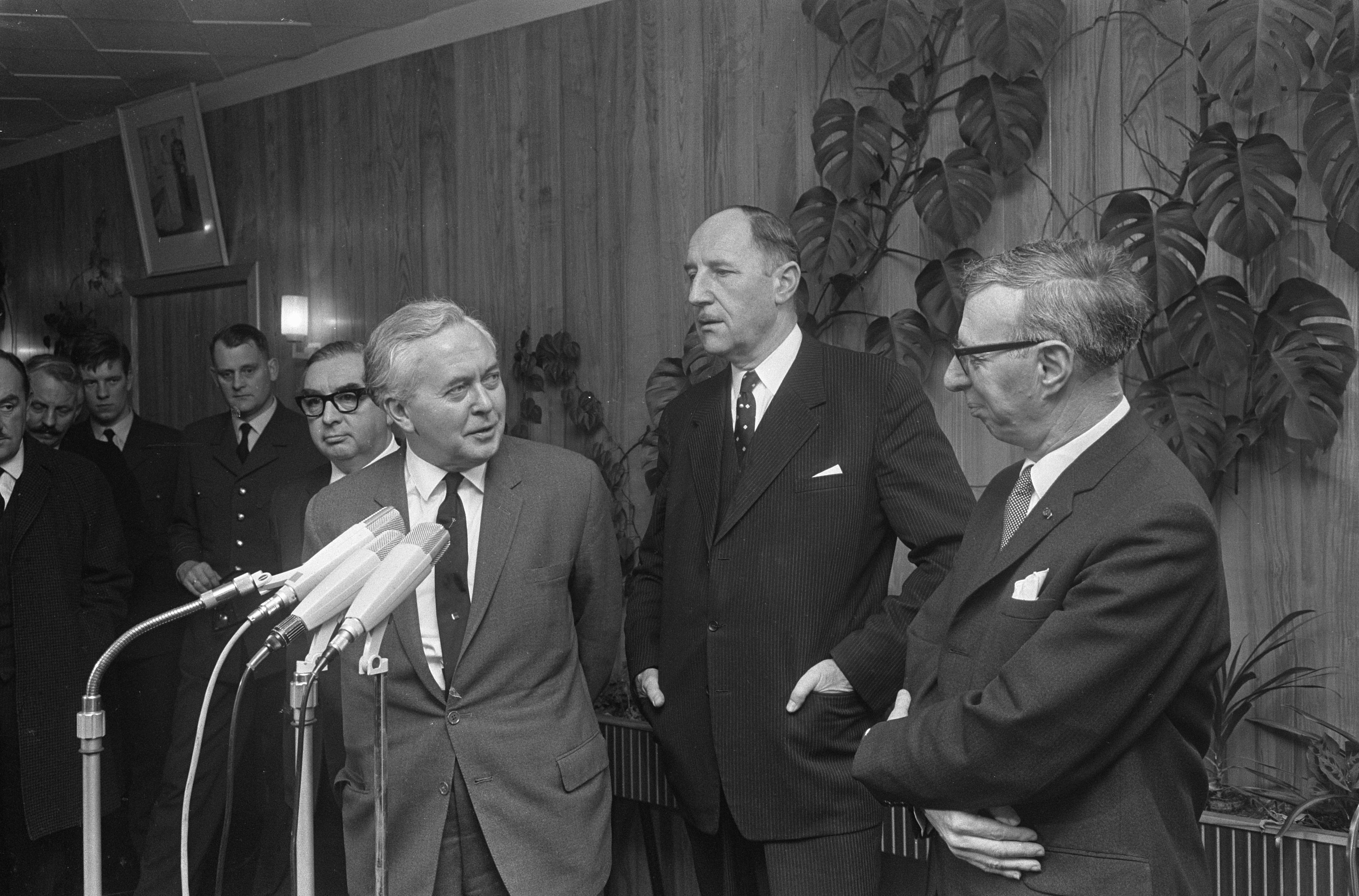
Secretary of State for Foreign of the United Kingdom George Brown, Prime Minister of the United Kingdom Harold Wilson, Minister of Foreign Affairs Joseph Luns and Prime Minister Jelle Zijlstra during a press conference at Ypenburg Airport on 26 February 1967

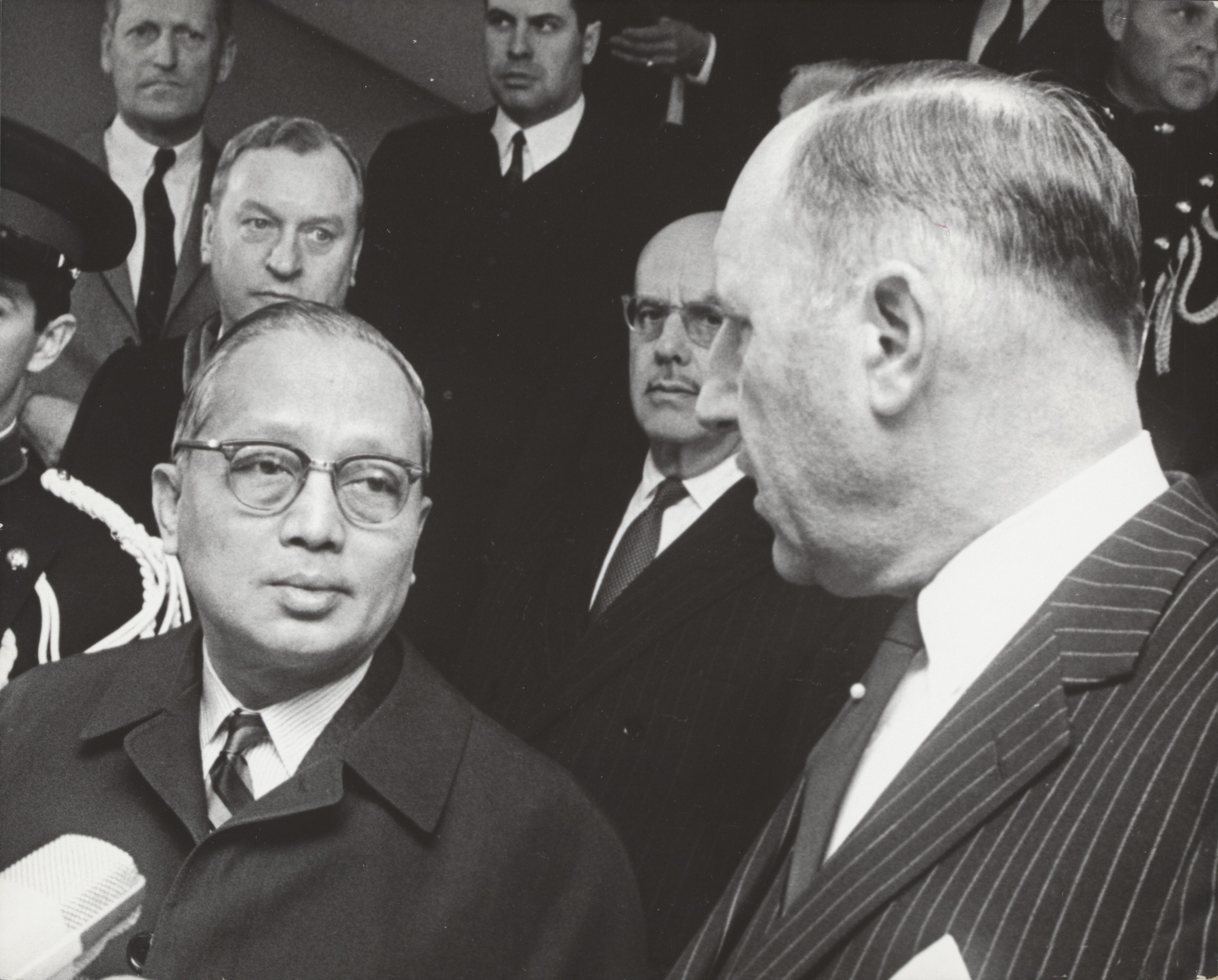
Secretary-General of the United Nations U Thant and Minister of Foreign Affairs Joseph Luns during a press conference at Airport Schiphol on 7 April 1968

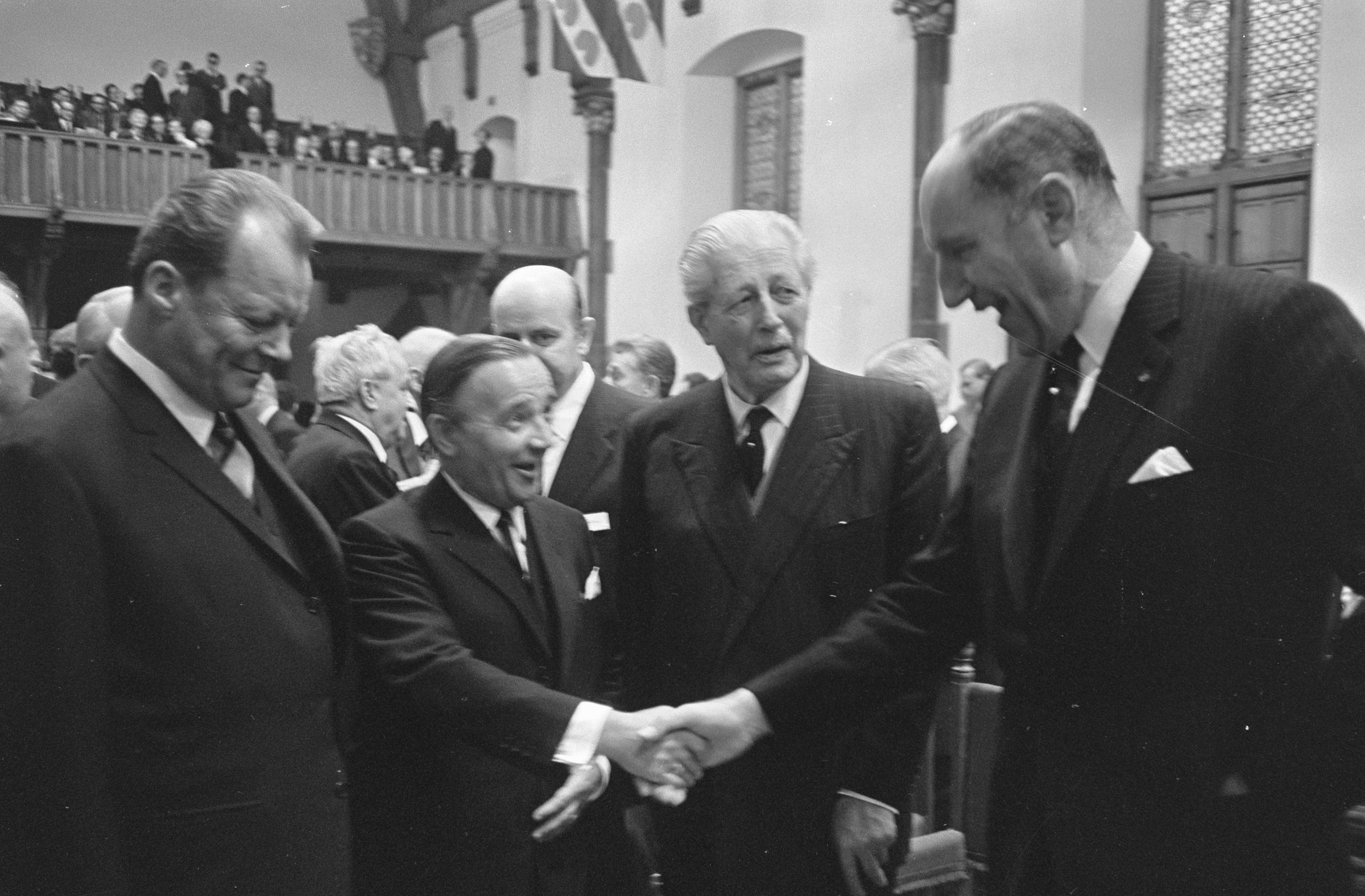
Minister of Foreign Affairs of West-Germany Willy Brandt, Prime Minister Piet de Jong, former Prime Minister of the United Kingdom Harold Macmillan and Minister of Foreign Affairs Joseph Luns at a European Economic Community in the Ridderzaal on 8 November 1968

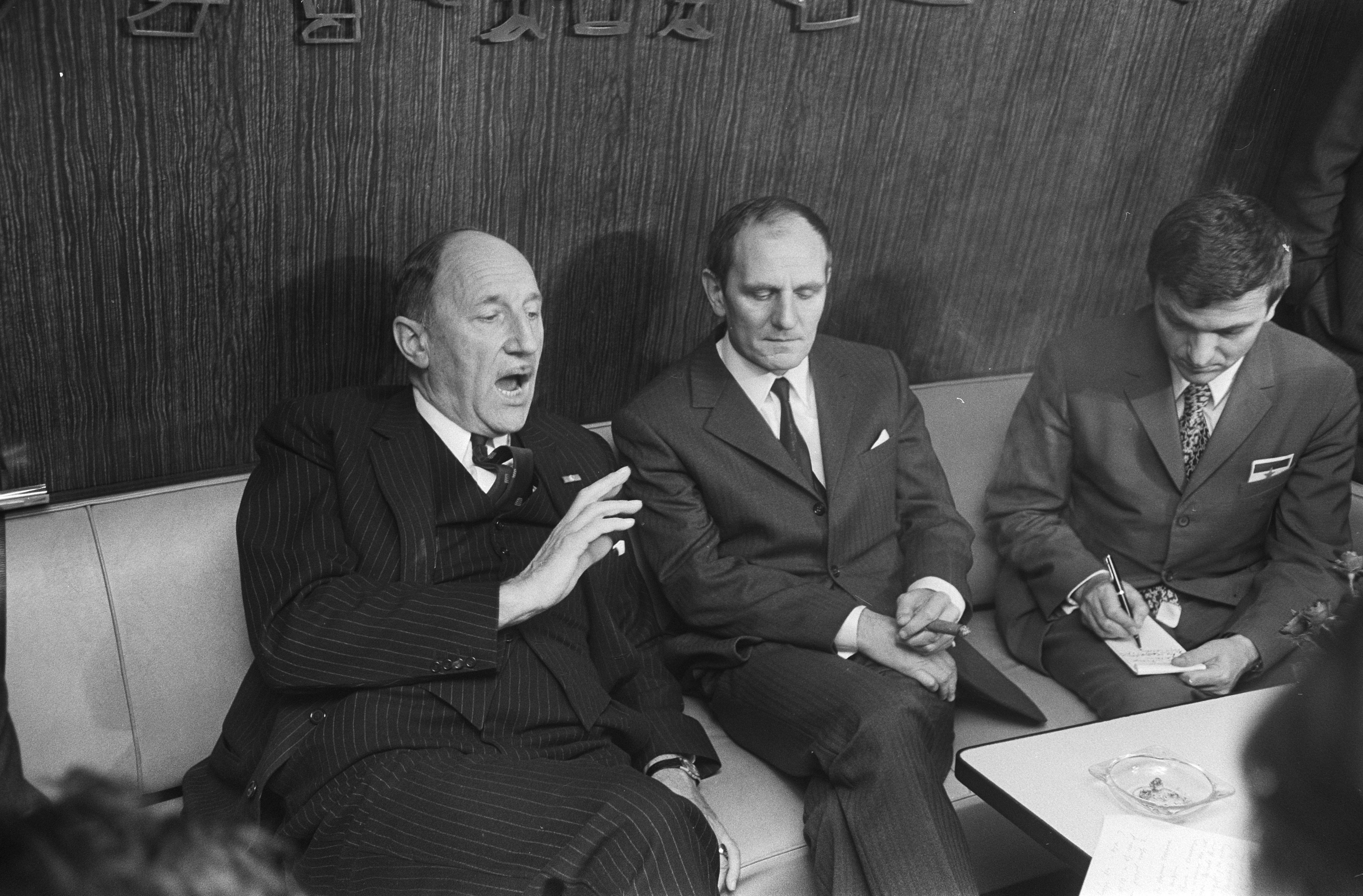
Minister of Foreign Affairs Joseph Luns and President of Yugoslavia Josip Broz Tito during a meeting in Rotterdam on 21 October 1970

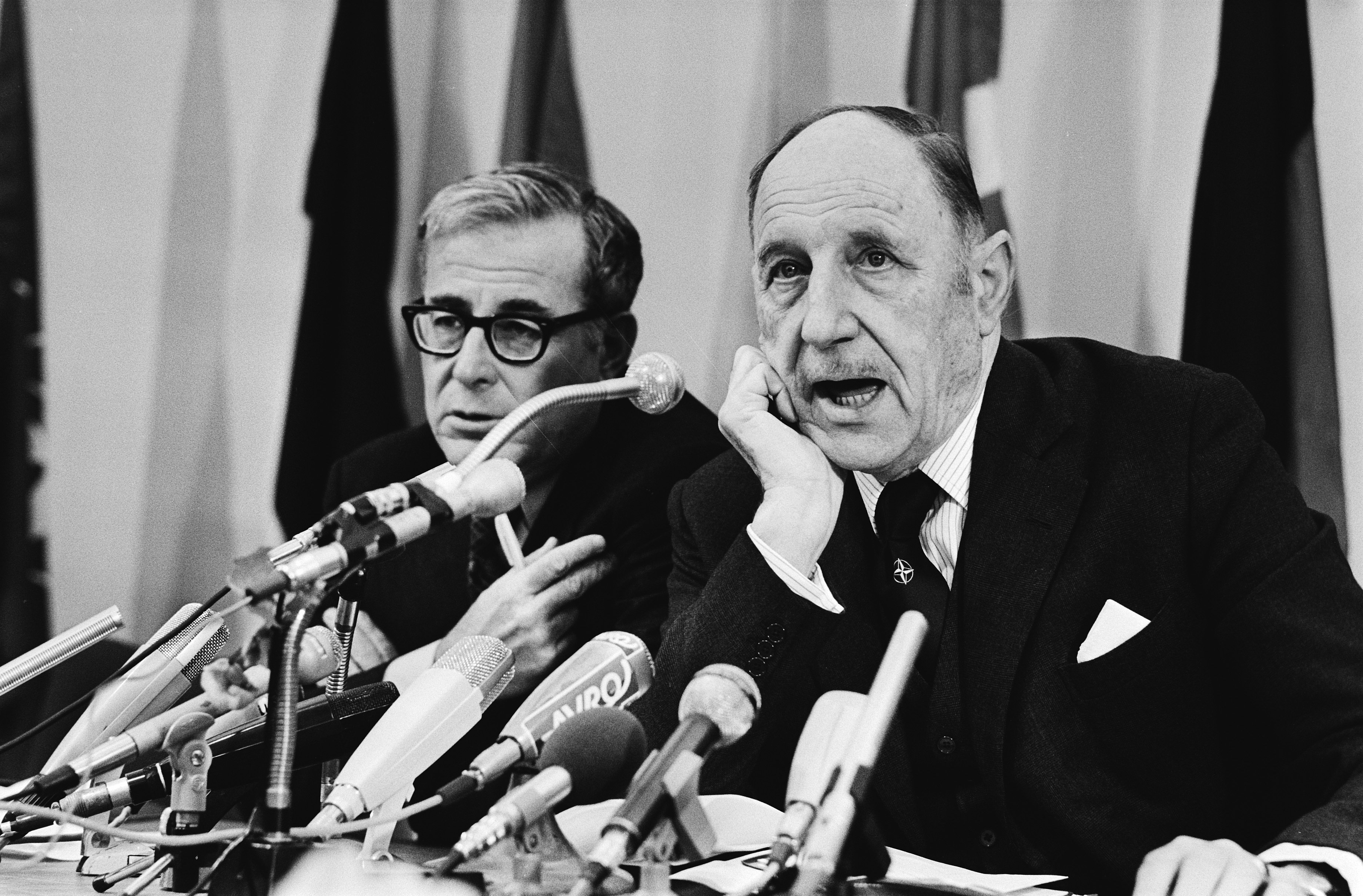
United States Secretary of Defense Harold Brown and Secretary General of NATO Joseph Luns at a press conference in The Hague on 14 November 1979

Like his father, Luns demonstrated a preference for conservative and authoritarian political parties and an interest in international politics. As a young student he positioned himself on the political right, favouring a strong authority for the state and being of the opinion that socialism, because of its idealistic ideology, had fostered the rise of fascism and nazism. Luns joined the National Socialist Movement in the Netherlands (NSB) in 1933 and left three years later but when questioned about it in later years, never admitted that it might have been "a youthful misjudgment".

His choice for a diplomatic career was inspired by his father. He joined the Dutch Diplomatic Service in 1938 and, after a two-year assignment at the Private Office of the Foreign Minister, was appointed as attaché in Bern (Switzerland) in 1940. In late 1941, he moved to Lisbon, Portugal. In both countries, he was involved in assistance to Dutch refugees, political espionage and counterintelligence. In 1943, he was transferred to the Dutch embassy in London. Ambassador Edgar Michiels van Verduynen discovered Luns's great affinity for the political element in international affairs and entrusted him with important files on Germany, which Luns handled with great skill.

In 1949, Luns was appointed as deputy Dutch permanent representative to the United Nations. He worked closely with his new chief, Von Balluseck, a political appointee without diplomatic experience. After the Netherlands became a member of the Security Council, he temporarily chaired the Disarmament Commission. Luns was sceptical of the importance of the United Nations for international peace, believing it at times to be more like a forum for propaganda than a centre for solving international conflicts. Still, he thought that it was worthwhile to keep the UN in shape because it was the sole international organisation which offered opportunities for discussions between all states.

=== Minister of Foreign Affairs (1952–1971) ===
Because of the tenacity of the Dutch Catholic People's Party to occupy the Foreign Ministry after the 1952 elections, Luns entered Dutch politics as the favourite of its political leader Carl Romme. His co-minister was Johan Beyen, an international banker not affiliated to any political party but the protégé of Queen Juliana. The two ministers had a completely different style of operating and clashed repeatedly on policy even before the end of 1952. However, they accommodated and avoided future conflicts by a very strict division of labour. Luns was responsible for bilateral relations, Benelux and international organisations. After the 1956 elections, Beyen left office and Luns stayed as Foreign Minister until 1971 in both centre-left and centre-right governments. Bilateral relations with Indonesia and the Federal Republic of Germany, security policy and European integration were the most important issues during his tenure. Atlantic co-operation was a fundamental aspect of Luns's foreign policy, and Dutch foreign policy in general. Luns believed that Western Europe could not survive the Cold War without American nuclear security and so he promoted strong and intensified political and military co-operation in NATO. Luns accepted American leadership of NATO as such but expected better co-operation between the United States States and its allies since, he thought that the United States too often acted independently of its allies, particularly in decolonisation issues. Luns could also be critical of US foreign policy, and, in bilateral relations, he defended Dutch national interests strongly and expected American support in the bilateral difficulties with Indonesia.

In 1952 Luns expected to improve relations with Indonesia without transferring the disputed area of West New Guinea to the former colony. By 1956, however, this policy had proved ineffectual, but Luns and the Dutch government were still determined not to transfer West New Guinea to the Republic of Indonesia. When, in 1960, it became obvious that allied support for this policy, particularly from the United States, was waning, Luns tried to find an intermediate solution by transferring the administration of the territory to the United Nations, but that attempt to keep West New Guinea out of Indonesian hands failed as well. After difficult negotiations, the area was finally transferred to the Republic of Indonesia in 1963 after a short interim administration of the UN. Despite his personal anger over this outcome, which was considered a personal defeat by Luns, the foreign minister still worked to restore relations with Indonesia in the aftermath of the West New Guinea problem.

Luns was more successful in the normalisation of the bilateral relations with West Germany. Luns shared Dutch public opinion in demanding that Germany recognise the damage it had caused during the Second World War, and so a mea culpa required. He demanded that before any negotiations on other bilateral disputes could start, the amount of damages to be paid to Dutch war victims had to be agreed upon. During the final stages of the negotiations on bilateral disputes between the two countries, Luns decided to come to an arrangement with his German colleague on his own accord. He made concessions and so the Dutch parliament threatened not to ratify the agreement. With the full support of the government however, Luns was able to overcome the crisis.

European integration was permanently on Luns's political agenda. Beyen had introduced the concept of the European Economic Community. In March 1957, Luns signed the Treaties of Rome establishing the EEC and Euratom. Although he preferred integration of a wider group of European states he accepted the treaty and defended the supranational structure it was based on. The endeavours of French president Charles de Gaulle to subordinate the institutions of the Six to an intergovernmental political structure, could count on strong opposition from Luns: such plans would, in his view, serve only French ambitions of a Europe independent of the United States.

Initially, Luns stood alone and was afraid that Franco-German co-operation would result in anti-Atlantic and anti-American policies that harmed the interests of the West. He made British membership of the European institutions conditional for his political co-operation. Gradually his views on Gaullist foreign policies were shared by the other EEC members and they joined Luns in his objections. Two of De Gaulle's decisions stiffened the opposition: his denial of EEC membership to the United Kingdom in January 1963 and France's retreat from the integrated military structure of NATO in 1966. Luns played a vital role in the negotiations unwinding French participation and continuing its political membership of the Alliance. By then, Luns had internationally established his reputation as an able and reliable negotiator and was seen as an important asset in London and Washington. After the retreat of De Gaulle in 1968, the EEC Summit of The Hague, in December 1969, ended the long crisis of the EEC integration process, opened the way to British membership and agreed on new venues for political co-operation, a common market and monetary union.

Throughout his years as Dutch foreign minister, Luns had gained an international status uncommon for a foreign minister of a small country. He owed this to his personal style in which duress, a high level of information, political leniency and diplomatic skills were combined with wit, gallant conversation and the understanding that diplomacy was a permanent process of negotiations in which a victory should never be celebrated too exuberantly at the cost of the loser.

=== NATO Secretary-General (1971–1984) ===
In 1971, Luns was appointed as NATO secretary-general. At the time of his appointment, public protests against American policies in Vietnam were vehement throughout Western Europe and among European politicians the credibility of the American nuclear protection was in doubt. Though there were initial doubts about his skills for the job he soon proved that he was capable of managing the alliance in crisis. He regarded himself as the spokesman of the alliance and he aimed at balancing the security and political interests of the alliance as a whole.

Luns was in favour of negotiating with the Soviet Union and the Warsaw Pact members on the reduction of armaments if the Western defence was kept in shape during such negotiations. European members of NATO, according to Luns, should understand that the United States carried international responsibilities while the latter should understand that in-depth consultation with the European governments was conditional to forging a united front on the international stage, which could be accepted and endorsed by all members of NATO.

US-Soviet negotiations on mutual troop reductions and the strategic nuclear arsenal caused severe tensions. Luns convinced American leaders that it undermined the credibility in Western Europe of their nuclear strategy by neglecting European fears of a change of strategy which would leave Europe unprotected in case of a Soviet nuclear attack. The modernisation of the tactical nuclear forces by the introduction of the neutron bomb and cruise missiles caused deep divisions. In the end, Luns succeeded in keeping NATO together in the so-called Double-Track Decision of December 1979. The deployment of these new weapon systems was linked to success in American-Soviet arms reduction talks.

It was also the duty of the secretary-general to mediate in cause of conflicts within the alliance. He was successful in the conflict between Great Britain and Iceland, the so-called Second Cod War not by pressuring the Icelandic government to end its aggressive behaviour against British trawlers but by convincing the British government that it had to take the first step by calling back its destroyers to open the way to negotiations. Luns failed however in the conflict between Greece and Turkey over the territorial boundaries and Cyprus. Lack of co-operation on both sides made Luns unable to mediate or advise on procedures to find a way out.

Between 1964 and 1984 he participated in every annual conference of the Bilderberg Group.

=== Late life ===
Luns retired as secretary-general in 1984, staying in office for almost 13 years, more than anyone else. Because of the changes the 1960s and 1970s had brought to Dutch society and culture, the strongly conservative Luns decided not to return to his home country but instead settled in Brussels to spend his remaining years in retirement. Luns died at 90.

== Honours and awards ==
Luns was awarded many high-ranking awards during his lifetime, among them the Grand Cross of the Légion d'Honneur in 1954, Member of Order of the Companions of Honour by Queen Elizabeth II in 1971 and the Presidential Medal of Freedom by then President Ronald Reagan in 1984. In his home country, he was awarded the Grand Cross of the Order of the Netherlands Lion, the highest civil decoration of the Netherlands, in 1953. In 1986, he was awarded the Atatürk International Peace Prize.

== Personal life ==
Luns married Baroness Lia van Heemstra, from the Van Heemstra family. The Lunses had two children − a son and a daughter.

He remained a practising Catholic throughout his life and was generally sympathetic to the traditionalist Catholic position but never affiliated himself with dissident groups. Luns visited the Tridentine Mass held by the Assumptionist priest Winand Kotte, who opposed the modernising policies of the Second Vatican Council, in St. Willibrord's Church, Utrecht in August 1971. This seems to have been something of a misunderstanding on Luns' part however, since he had never heard of Kotte's anti-Council movement and did not wish to be affiliated with it.

An avid stamp collector, his favourite reading material included classical literature, history books (Luns was an expert on the history of the Napoleonic era) and detective novels. Because of his interests in international navies, the latest edition of Jane's Fighting Ships was always within his reach in his office.

== Decorations ==
Honours
Ribbon bar	Honour	Country	Date	Comment
	Grand Cross of the Order of the Rose	Brazil	10 January 1953	
	Grand Cross of the Order of St. Olav	Norway	25 April 1953	
	Knight Grand Cross of the Order of Merit	Italy	15 September 1953	
	Grand Cross of the Order of Leopold	Belgium	10 January 1954	
	Grand Cross of the Order of George I	Greece	14 February 1954	
	Knight Grand Cross of the Order of Menelik II	Ethiopia	1 July 1954	
	Grand Cross of the Legion of Honour	France	12 August 1954	
	Grand Cross of the Order of the Oak Crown	Luxembourg	30 May 1955	
	Knight Grand Cross of the Order of the White Elephant	Thailand	5 September 1955	
	Commander Grand Cross of the Order of the Polar Star	Sweden	30 September 1955	
	Grand Cross of the Order of Merit	Germany	10 December 1956	
	Knight Grand Cross of the Order of Orange-Nassau	Netherlands	5 December 1966	Elevated from Grand Officer (29 April 1959)
	Honorary Member of the Order of the Companions of Honour	United Kingdom	14 June 1971	
	Knight Grand Cross of the Order of the Netherlands Lion	Netherlands	17 July 1971	Elevated from Commander (18 October 1956)
	Presidential Medal of Freedom	United States	10 June 1984	

== Notes ==
Political offices
Vacant Title last held by Eelco van Kleffens	Minister for Foreign Policy; 1952–1956	Office discontinued
Preceded by Johan Beyen	Minister of Foreign Affairs; 1956–1971	Succeeded by Norbert Schmelzer
Diplomatic posts
Preceded by Manlio Brosio	Secretary General of NATO; 1971–1984	Succeeded by Lord Carrington
