= Willem Molkenboer =

Dutch sculptor and art educator

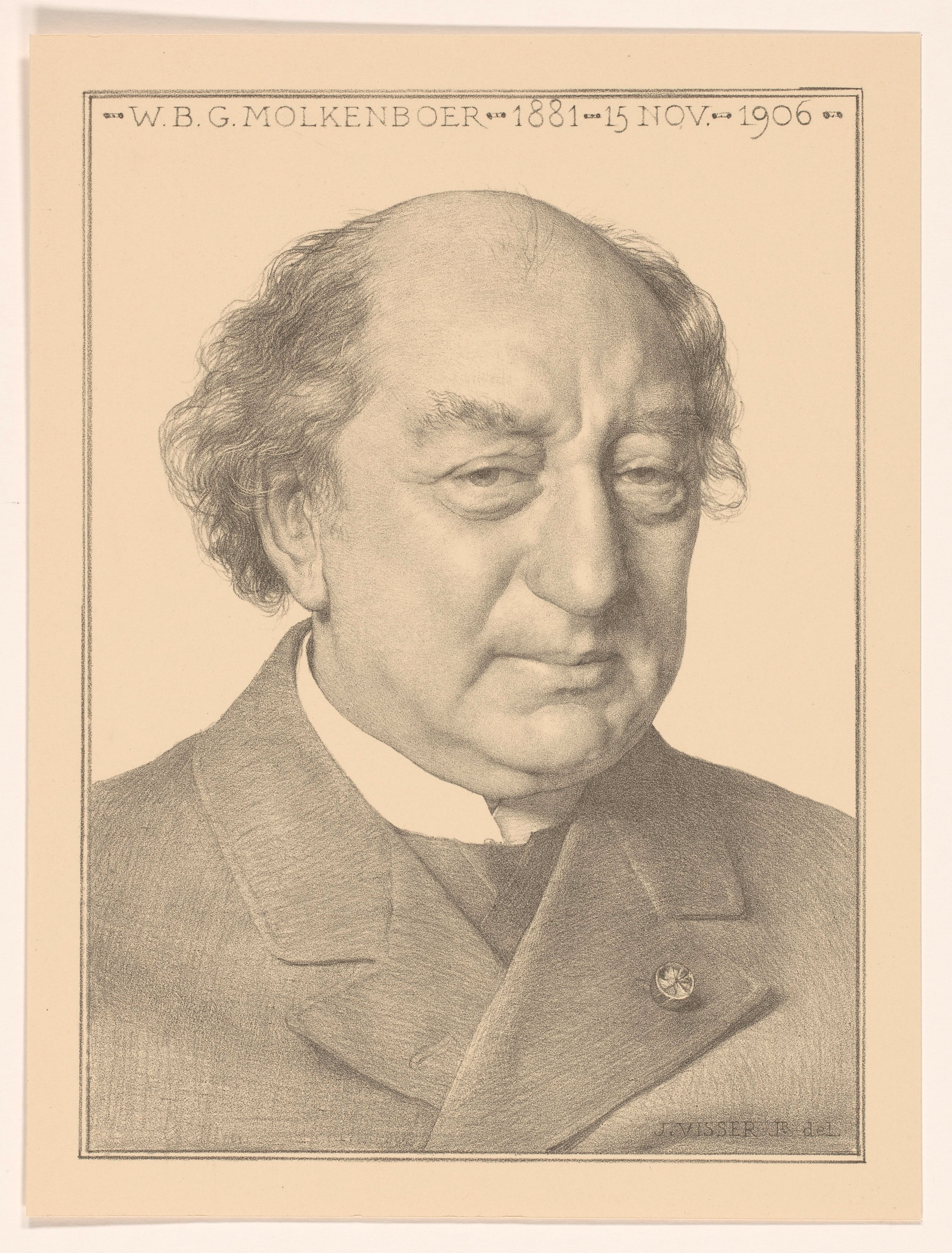
Willem Molkenboer, by Jan Visser jr. (1906)

Wilhelmus Bernardus Gerardus Molkenboer, known as Willem (8 June 1844, Leiden - 9 December 1915, Amsterdam) was a Dutch sculptor and art educator.

== Life and work ==
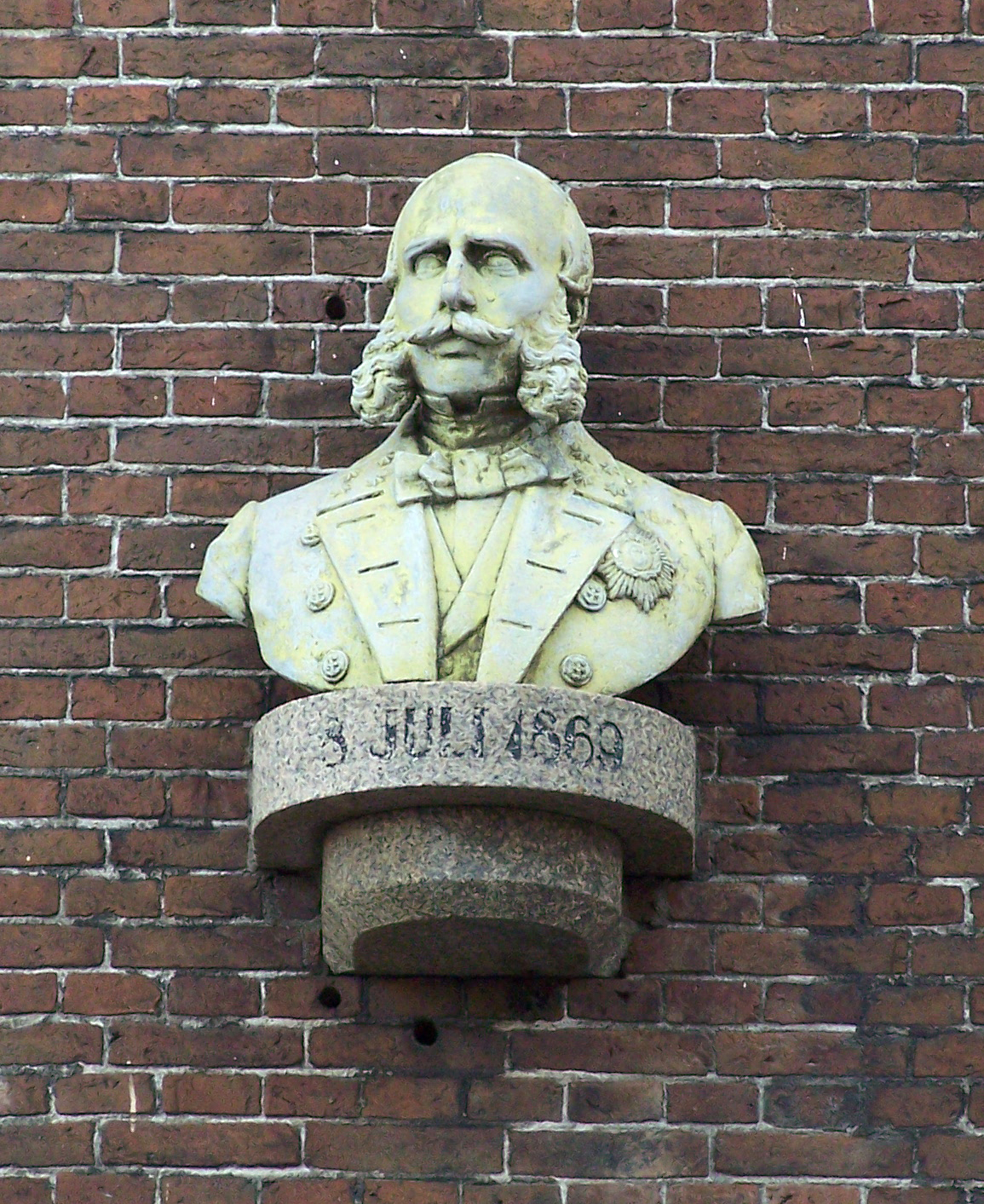
Bust of Prince Hendrik

He was born to Theodorus Molkenboer (1801-1872), a baker, and his wife, Euphemia née Halderiet (1804-1880). As their only son, it was originally intended that he should take over the family business. At the age of fourteen, however, he began a five-year apprenticeship in the workshops of the sculptor, Stephen Louis Veneman;, a good friend of his father's cousin, an architect, who was also named Theodorus Molkenboer. During those years, he also attended night classes at the Royal Academy of Arts and Design.

In 1863, after completing his apprenticeship, he set out on the traditional "Wanderjahre". His first stop was Cologne, where he acquired some knowledge of woodworking. He then went to Munich, where he improved his skills for working with marble. From 1865 to 1867, he worked at studios in Antwerp and Leuven. In later years, he published humorous anecdotes about his experiences, under a pseudonym, in De Courant. He obtained a teaching certificate in 1868, and found employment as an art teacher at the Hogere Burgerschool in Leeuwarden.

During his time with Veneman, he had boarded with the family of Antonius Derkinderen, a silversmith. In 1870, he married Maria Cecilia Petronella Johanna Derkinderen (1848-1934) whose brother, Antoon, would later become an artist. They had fourteen children; three who died as toddlers, two who became artists (Theo and Antoon), and one who became a designer (Phemia).

He spent thirteen years as a teacher in Leeuwarden, but continued to be active as a sculptor. In 1871, he was commissioned to create a bust of Prince Hendrik, on the occasion of his visit to the city. He set up a workshop in 1875, to make reliefs for building façades. After 1878, his attention slowly became more focused on art education, and he published some pamphlets on the subject.

As a result, in 1880 he and the painter, Jan Striening, were assigned to study the methods of art education in Belgium. They were found to be superior. In response to the "België-rapport", the Dutch government began a national training program. The following year, he was transferred to Amsterdam, where he became Director of the Normaalschool for drawing education. In 1893, on the occasion of his twenty-fifth year as an art teacher, he was named an Officer in the Order of Orange-Nassau, by Queen Consort Emma. By 1900, there were sixty drawing schools, and he was in charge of the inspections.

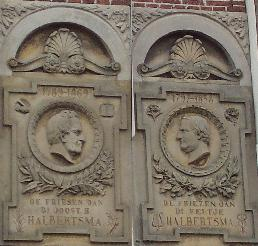
Gable stones for Eeltsje Hiddes Halbertsma and his brother, Justus, at their birthplace in Grou

The reforms eventually met with conservative opposition, and his supervisory role was reduced or eliminated at forty-seven schools. In 1906, he undertook another study trip, to Germany, to examine the reforms there. In 1908, similar studies were done in England, Scotland, Austria and Hungary. He came up with several proposals for reorganization, but none were even seriously discussed until 1917. He retained his post as Director at the Normaalschool until his death in 1915, and was not replaced immediately. The position would ultimately remain vacant for eight years.
