= Theo Molkenboer =

Dutch painter

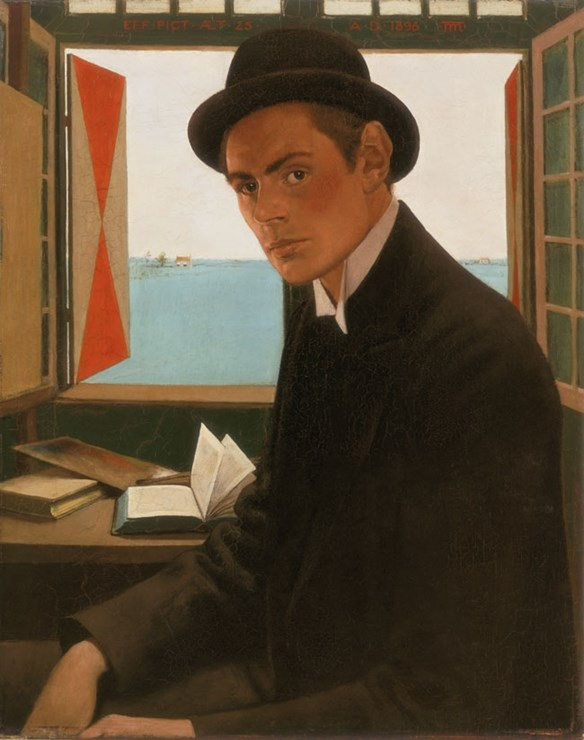
Self-portrait (1896)

Theodorus Henricus Antonius Adolph Molkenboer (23 February 1871, Leeuwarden – 1 December 1920, Lugano) was a Dutch painter and designer, notably, of book covers and posters. He was also an expert on the history of Dutch folk costumes and wrote several short works on that subject.

== Biography ==
His father was the architect and painter Willem Molkenboer. His brother, Antoon, also became a painter and his sister, Phemia, an artist as well. He began his studies in Amsterdam at the "Rijksnormaalschool voor Tekenonderwijzers" (Royal Normal School for Technical Drawing), a school that was founded by his father. He graduated in 1891 and, for a short time, worked as an architectural draftsman in the offices of Pierre Cuypers. He maintained a lifelong interest in church architecture and wrote an influential article on the topic for De Katholieke Illustratie,

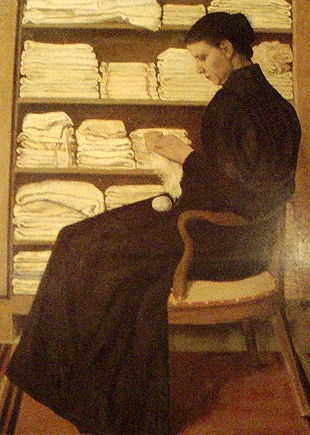
Mother at the Linen Closet (1895)

He felt more drawn to decorative painting and portraiture so, in 1892, he enrolled at the Rijksakademie, where he studied with August Allebé, Gerrit Willem Dijsselhof, and his uncle, Antoon Derkinderen. His first major commission was a portrait of Jan Six, a Professor at the Akademie and well-known art collector. He later did portraits of many notable figures in the Catholic Church. In 1897, he won the Willink van Collenprijs.

His writing career began in 1894, with essays on art for De Tijd. In 1900, he helped co-found a publication called "Van Onze Tijd" (In Our Times). His reactions against those who disagreed with him were often passionate and took up much of his time. In 1901, the priest and poet, Herman Schaepman advised him that "art is not criticism or contemplation, it is an act". He ignored this advice and became something of an outcast from the artistic community because of his focus on polemics and controversy. In those years, Molkenboer's artistic efforts also became fragmented, as he dabbled in etching, lithography, sculpting, glass painting, ceramics and furniture design in a quest for versatility. He served as the Director of a pottery factory in Utrecht from 1901 to 1904.

Following the example of his brother, Antoon, he began making lengthy stays in the United States to give personal service to his American customers. He spent much of the years 1909 to 1913 living there, mostly in Boston and Washington. His most prestigious commission was a portrait of President William Howard Taft, who posed for him in 1912 at the White House.

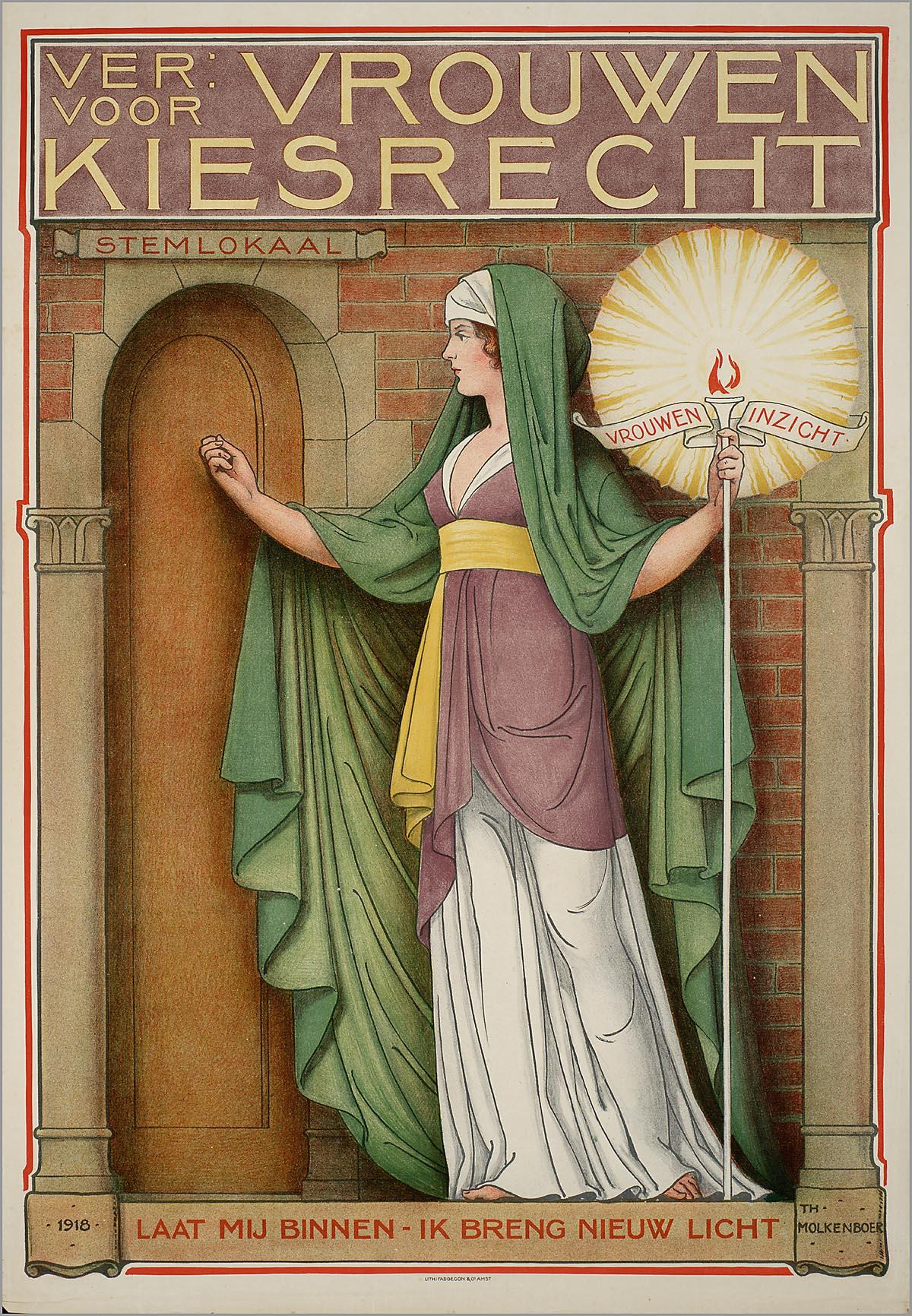
Poster for the "Vereeniging voor Vrouwenkiesrecht" (1918)

On returning to the Netherlands, he became a member of the Nederlandsche Vereeniging voor Ambachts- en Nijverheidskunst (V.A.N.K.) the Dutch Association for Craft and Craft Art, and began collecting Dutch costumes. He organized the first Festival of National Costumes, held in September, 1913, and spent the next few years travelling throughout the Low Countries, taking photographs and collecting data on the local folk costumes, which were in danger of disappearing. He put together a booklet that was published in 1917, but was unsatisfied and asked the Ministry of the Interior to subsidize further studies and the collection of actual costumes. The Royal Netherlands Academy of Arts and Sciences backed his plan, but it was opposed by Adriaan Pit, the Director of the Nederlands Museum van Geschiedenis en Kunst, and the municipal government of Amsterdam, due to ongoing disagreements about the museum's contents.

His battles with the government bureaucracy left him exhausted and he was diagnosed with tuberculosis. In 1920, he went to a sanatorium in the Swiss Alps, seeking a cure, but died a few months later. His art works and collections were auctioned off the following year. In 2010, his painting "The Toilette" was used on the Netherlands 44 Eurocent postage stamp.
