= Garf =

Garf or Garff may refer to:

- Robert H. Garff (1942–2020), American businessman and politician
- Salomon Garf (1879–1943), Dutch painter and graphic artist
- Vilhelm Garf (1885–1938), Russian and Soviet military officer
- Garff, one of the six sheadings of the Isle of Man
- GARF, State Archive of the Russian Federation
- an encoder of Vorbis, a free and open-source software project
