= Hendrik Jan Wolter =

Dutch painter

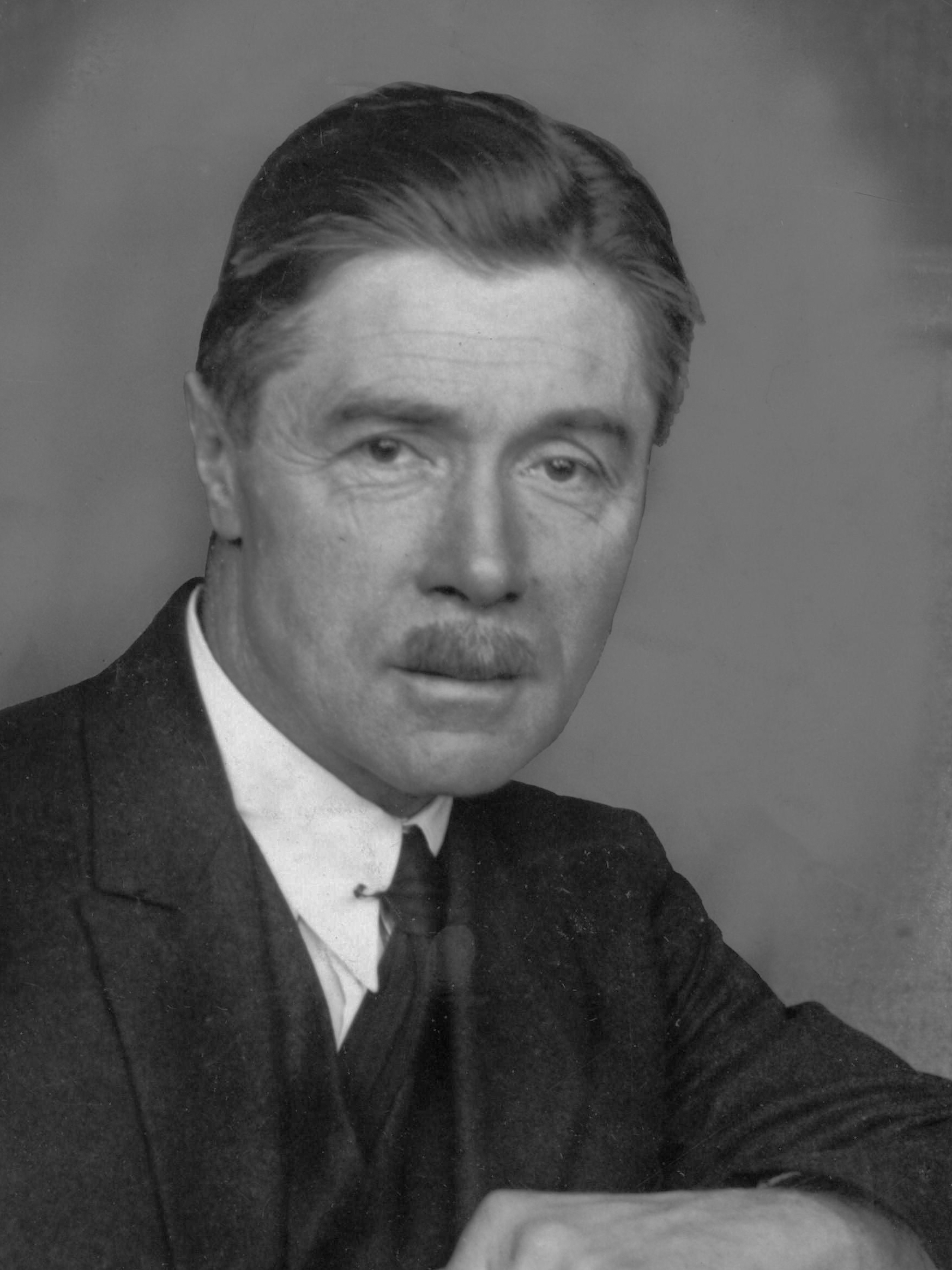
- Hendrik Jan Wolter in 1925
- Born: 15 July 1873; Amsterdam, Netherlands
- Died: 29 October 1952 (aged 79); Amersfoort, Netherlands
- Occupation: Painter

Hendrik Jan (Henk) Wolter (Amsterdam 15 July 1873 – Amersfoort 29 October 1952) was a Dutch painter, primarily known for his impressionistic and luministic paintings, influenced by the French impressionists and Belgian luminists Emile Claus and Theo van Rysselberghe.

Youth

Wolter grew up in the inner city of Amsterdam, where his father (civil engineer by profession) operated one of the first Dutch companies installing heating systems in buildings and houses. In 1885 the family and the company moved to the provincial town of Amersfoort, where Wolter discovered his talent for the arts. He received his first drawing lessons from his teacher in the German language, W.N. Coenen, who had followed painting classes at the State Academy of Fine Arts in Amsterdam. Like so many adolescents from well-to-do families of his day, Henk Wolter became fascinated by sports and became a fairly successful cyclist, winning various races between 1890 and 1894. After finishing secondary school, at the behest of his father he followed a one-year military training at the Infantry academy at Haarlem. Having successfully completed the course, he requested his father's consent to start art college, where his heart lay. In 1895 he was accepted as a student at the Royal Academy of Fine Arts in Antwerp. In 1896 he was admitted to the Institut Supérieur of the academy, where he graduated in 1899.

Early career

At the end of 1899 Wolter returned to the Netherlands and established himself at a studio in Leusden, close to Amersfoort. His works in the early years of his career were strongly influenced by the classicist style that was taught at the Antwerp Academy at the time. He painted in a naturalistic style using colours with dark overtones (brown, grey, green) reminiscent of the Hague School of Dutch painters from the second half of the 19th century. The painting "Dooi" (Thaw) for which Wolter received the Willink Van Collen prize in 1904, is a prime example of his work in this style.

In 1904 Wolter married Koosje van Hoorn, daughter of a vicar from Winschoten in the north of Holland, and they moved to Laren, which at the time had a lively painter community. In 1906 his son Hendrik was born. Around that time Wolter's palette began to include lighter colours although he still painted in a naturalistic style. After visits to Devon (1910) and Cornwall (1911–1913) in England Wolter, fascinated by the play of light on water, developed a divisionist, impressionistic style with vibrant colors. His lively paintings of the fishing villages of Polperro and St Ives and the surrounding coast are among his best work from this period.

World War I

During World War I (the Great War 1914–1918) the Netherlands remained neutral, and during those four years it was virtually impossible for Wolter to travel. Early 1915 the family moved to Amsterdam, where Wolter had a studio on the third floor of a house overlooking the Amstel river. From there he had a marvellous view of the river, the various bridges and, beyond, the imposing buildings of the Amstel Hotel and the Carré theatre. During the war years Wolter painted the view from his studio at different seasons and times, with changing light and weather conditions and these 'Amstel views' are among the best and most expensive works of his career. At the same time he frequented the busy harbour of Amsterdam, where he painted the ships lying at the quays, both the traditional wooden barges used for inland transport and the modern seagoing general cargo ships. During these years Wolter also experimented with a pointillist, luministic style, inspired by the paintings of Emile Claus and Theo van Rysselberghe that he had become acquainted with during his studies in Antwerp.

Post war years

After the War, Wolter resumed his travels to England, and from 1920 to 1925 he visited London and Cornwall every year. Fascinated by the shipping traffic, the docks and wharves on the Thames, he made many paintings showing the river and the busy maritime trade, often with London Bridge, Tower Bridge or Waterloo Bridge in the distance. Starting in the 1920s, Wolter made a series of works of factories and workshops, such as sewing workshops, the Heineken brewery, the Hoogovens steelworks and Whitefriars Crystal Polishing Factory. Around the same time, he started painting self portraits and made a number of portraits of friends and family. His work was part of the painting event in the art competition at the 1924 Summer Olympics. During the Amsterdam Summer Olympics in 1928 Wolter was a member of the international jury of the art event.

Professor in Amsterdam

In 1925 Wolter was appointed professor at the State Academy of Fine Arts in Amsterdam. From 1926 Wolter acted as chairman of the governmental Committee of Foreign Exhibitions, which determined which painters (and paintings) were shown at exhibitions abroad, including the Venice Biennale. His frequent visits there resulted in paintings of the canals, churches and buildings of Venice. The steady income his professorship provided enabled him to travel farther afield, in particular to France. From 1929 he painted in Brittany (the fishing ports of Douarnenez and Tréboul, which he had already visited in 1920), in the impressionist 'home town' of Honfleur and later in the South of France (inter alia Antibes, Nice, Villefranche-sur-mer, Menton, Sanary-sur-mer, Espalion, Albi, Saint-Paul-de-Vence).In 1938 he retired from his professorship and associated roles. Wolter and his wife then made a journey to France, Rome, and various other places in Italy. During this trip Wolter discovered the picturesque fishing port of Camogli, south of Genoa, where he produced numerous oil sketches of both the inner and the outer harbour.

World War II and final years

In 1939, Wolter and Koosje returned to Italy, planning to stay for a longer period of time. In that year, Wolter mainly painted in Rome, where the couple lived until the Second World war broke out on 1 September 1939, when they returned to the Netherlands. Having sold the house in Amsterdam where they had lived, Wolter designed a new house at Laren, where they moved in 1940, just before the Netherlands were occupied by Nazi Germany. When they moved to Laren for the first time in 1904, Wolter had designed the house where they then lived, building another house with studio in 1905 where they lived until their moving to Amsterdam in 1915. Wolter designed a total of seven or eight houses in Laren. Some of these were commissions, but Wolter also built on land he or his wife had acquired, selling the plot when the house (or studio) was finished. In 1946, Wolter and his wife made a last travel abroad, to the United States, where his son was living in Woodstock, NY. During that trip he made several oil sketches, in particular a series of views of Manhattan from Weehawken, NJ. In the early 1950s, Wolter's health deteriorated quickly and he died in 1952, at the age of 79.

Le maître Hollandais

In his lifetime, Wolter's works were shown at many exhibitions in the Netherlands and abroad. As a member of the artist associations Club De Tien, St Lucas, Arti et Amicitiae, Pulchri Studio and Hollandsche Kunstenaarskring Wolter participated in many of the annual exhibitions they organised. In addition, from 1908 Wolter had a number of solo exhibitions in galleries and musea across the Netherlands. Wolter's work was included in the 1939 exhibition and sale Onze Kunst van Heden (Our Art of Today) at the Rijksmuseum in Amsterdam. After his death, Wolter gained international recognition through an exhibition at Galerie Bernheim-Jeune in Paris in 1959, titled "Wolter, le maître Hollandais 1873-1952. Upon the death of his wife Koosje in 1968, several exhibitions were organised (inter alia by Gebroeders Douwes in Amsterdam) in the 1970s to sell some of the works from Wolter's large estate which contained around 600 works. In 1992 Museum Flehite in Amersfoort held an exhibition of Wolter's work entitled "Hendrik Jan Wolter Painter of Light and Colour" and again in 2010 under the title "Travelling with Hendrik Jan Wolter". The museum commemorated Wolter's 150th birthday in 2023 with an exhibition entitled "Wolter & Water", containing over 100 works of harbours, sea coasts, rivers and other 'water works'. In 2018, a first part of an oeuvre catalogue of Wolter's paintings was published, containing around 425 works covering his entire career. Museum Flehite in Amersfoort holds a large collection of his works, as does Singer Museum in Laren. Works by Wolter are also in the collection of inter alia Boymans van Beuningen, Stedelijk Museum Amsterdam, the Amsterdam museum, the Stadsarchief Amsterdam and Stadhuismuseum Zierikzee.

For more information (in particular the locations where he painted) see the website of the Stichting Vrienden van de schilder H.J. Wolter (Friends of the painter H.J. Wolter).
