= Inez de Heer Kloots =

Dutch ceramist

Inez de Heer Kloots, also known as Inez de Heer or Inez Kloots, is a Dutch ceramist and artist.

== Career ==
In 1975 De Heer Kloots taught ceramics at Artishock in Soest. A colleague who taught goldsmithing there collected eggs; in payment for a ring by that colleague, De Heer Kloots made an egg for her. She kept making eggs and took them to the annual egg exhibition in Arnhem, where she was invited to come to Germany; there, someone from Paris invited her to come to France. From then on she would exhibit her eggs in Germany six weeks before Easter. Her collectors grew older and no younger ones followed, and she wanted a new challenge; she went on making eggs, but only for special occasions.

She was married to Theo van der Hoeven, a designer from Amersfoort. Van der Hoeven died in 2012.

In Amersfoort, De Heer Kloots took part in the 2007 and 2009 editions of the KunstVaarRoute, a biennial sculpture route in and along the city's canals. She also exhibited at the Stadsgalerij in Amersfoort.

== Public art ==
=== Sol ===
The astronomy department of Utrecht University devised the plan for a scale model of the Solar System in the city, with the Sun on the Domplein. Van der Hoeven worked out the plan as its designer and designed the Sun, the Sol, a bronze sphere on a red granite plinth; at a later stage De Heer Kloots assisted him. Van der Hoeven made the model with his wife and son, and it went to the bronze foundry in February 1994. The university presented the Sol to the city for the centenary of the Academiegebouw; Princess Margriet unveiled the work in front of that building on 12 April 1994. At the unveiling, an exhibition on the plans for the Utrecht solar system, set up by De Heer Kloots and Evert Landré, was on view in the Academiegebouw. The couple also designed the carriers on which the planets of the model were to be mounted.

=== Seating sculptures ===
Seating sculptures on the terrace of Museum Amersfoort

On the terrace of Museum Amersfoort (known as Museum Flehite until 2026), seating sculptures by De Heer Kloots were unveiled on 27 April 2009: bright red benches and oval, egg-shaped seats. The commission had been given three years earlier, after De Heer Kloots had suggested to the museum's director at the time that the garden be taken in hand; the two had met at the unveiling of some of her works at Zon en Schild. She chose eggs because they suited the two bird-like sculptures by Nicolaas van Os on the terrace.

=== Het Concert ===
Together with Van der Hoeven, De Heer Kloots made Het Concert (The Concert), three figures in a pond along the Mina Krusemansingel in the Petenbos district of Veenendaal. The figures wear masks and each hold a horn to their mouth, as if giving a concert for the local residents. The building company Van Elst, the developer of Petenbos, gave the work to the residents of the district.

== Gallery ==
Sol (with Theo van der Hoeven), 1994. Domplein, Utrecht

Artwork on the facade of 't Haevepoort on the Wageningseberg, Amersfoort

Kraag van Johan van Oldenbarnevelt (Johan van Oldenbarnevelt's collar), memorial to Johan van Oldenbarnevelt on the facade of the ASV-Daltonschool, Amersfoort

Cakes on the roof of Bibliotheek Kruiskamp in Amersfoort, celebrating the library's 50th anniversary in 2010 (with Theo van der Hoeven)
