= Goudeket =

Goudeket is a surname. Notable people with the surname include:

- Helena Elisabeth Goudeket (1910–1943), Dutch painter and illustrator
- Isidore Goudeket (1883–1943), Dutch gymnast and Holocaust victim
