= Willink van Collenprijs =

Former Dutch art award

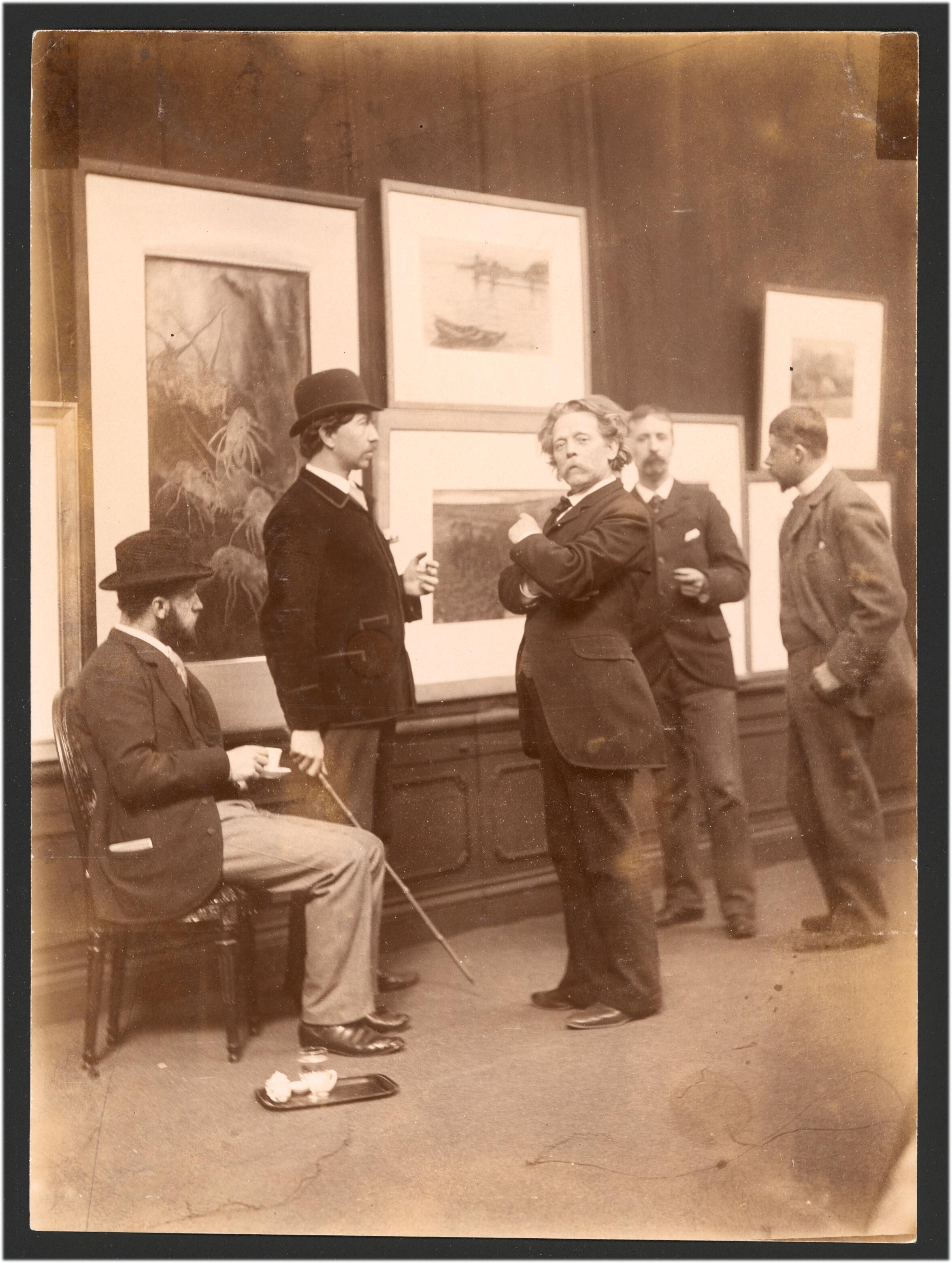
Committee for art exhibits in 1893, showing from left to right Geo Poggenbeek, Nicolaas Bastert, F. M. Heyl, Hein Kever and George Hendrik Breitner

Willink van Collenprijs (English: The Willink van Collen Award) is a former Dutch art award, which was awarded for the first time in 1880 by the Sociëteit Arti et Amicitiae. It was intended as an encouragement award for young artists, and was considered a national counterpart to the Paris Salon. Its existence of more than 71 years proves the success of Amsterdam's art policy. For many of its winners, it was a valuable boost to their careers in the Dutch art world. Some of the prize winners were also recognized abroad and remain well known today.

== Background ==
During the "Second Golden Age of Dutch painting", the Dutch painters enjoyed considerable arts patronage from the upper class. This can also be seen in the context of the Hague School and the School of Allebé.

The Amsterdam-born painter Wilhem Ferdinand Willink van Collen (1847–1881) and his wife Anna Weber-van Bosse were great art lovers. After his death, he bequeathed a sum of 30,000 guilders to the society Arti et Amicitiae to set up a trust fund. The aim was to support young artists' income during their difficult initial phase. This also happened at painter's schools like Düsseldorf painter's School (Note: The Golden Age of the Düsseldorf Painters' School lasted from 1819 to 1918.), Copenhagen School (Note: The high level phase of the Copenhagen School lasted from 1770 to about 1850.), Weimar Saxon-Grand Ducal Art School (Note: The Großherzoglich-Sächsische Kunstschule Weimar did exist from 1860–1910. Then it was raised to the rank of an art school.), the Munich School (Note: The Munich School originated in the sphere of the "Royal Academy of the Pedagogic Arts". It had her high-level phase in the period 1825-1914.), Academy of Beaux-Arts to Paris (Note: The Académie royale de peinture et de sculpture, founded in 1648 was the first Art School. In the year 1803, it became more independent and changed its name to Académie des Beaux-Arts.), Accademia di Belle Arti di Firenze (Note: This academy has a long tradition up to now. From about 1850 to 1914 it was very important for Italy.) as well as the Barbizon School (Note: The School of Barbizon had her work time from 1830 to about 1895.) and the new French Impressionism (Note: The Time of the Pre-Impressionism ran from 1840-1869. The Impressionism itself ended in 1889. Then the "Belle Époque" began.) to give a chance to the Dutch young generation, too.

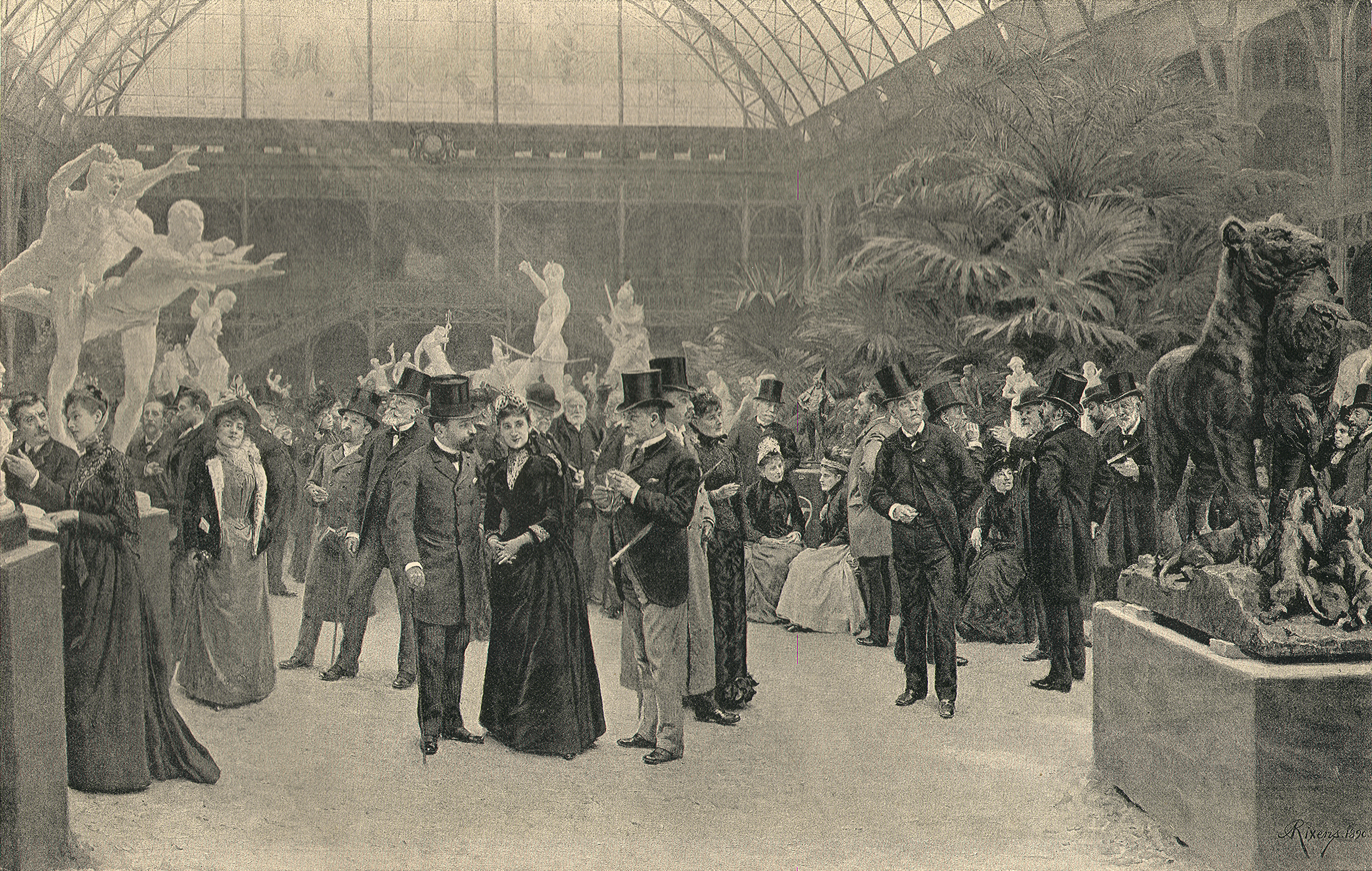
The Pariser Salon in 1890.

The annual art exhibition of the Paris Salon was the most important event, too. It was the centre of the painters of Europe and it was very difficult to be allowed to exhibit there. The Five prizes awarded there were highly desired. It concerned two Gold Medals (medals of the 1st class) and three Silver Medals (medals of the 2nd class). Moreover, "Recognitions" and "Honorable Mentions" were pronounced. All this needed an answer in the Netherlands.

The board of Directors of the Association "Arti et Amiticitae" decided to hold an annual painting competition for all Dutch artists. Participants were required to reside in the Netherlands, and be under the age of 30. Later, the age limit was raised to 35. The paintings were submitted unsigned, and evaluated by the jury anonymously. Originally, there was a first place, a second place and a third one, a commendation – structured like the prizes of the Paris Salon. Not every prize was awarded every year. This approach was maintained until 1893. The jury had to deal with a problem of a special kind. The standard of entries was quite staggering. In 1891 it was decided to select a more difficult theme, to deter painters with inadequate training.

The following year, the jury decided to award no first prize. The reason was: It was felt that "no sufficient artistic value" was presented in the submitted works.

== No award and its consequences ==
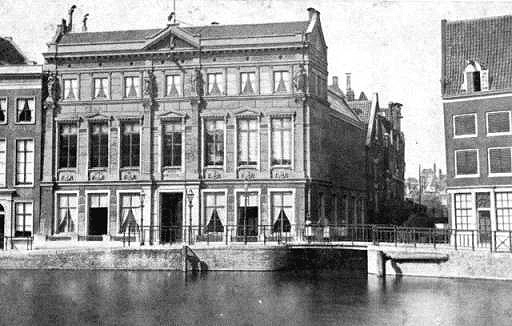
The house of the Sociëteit Arti et Amicitiae at Rokin 3 in Amsterdam. This is where the Willink van Collenprijs was awarded.

In 1893, a competition to design a mural for the organizers' building was announced. Only seven submissions were received, all of which disappointed the jury. For the first time in the history of the award, neither the prize nor the commendation were awarded. In 1894, the executive board decided to proceed differently. Instead of awarding the prize, the award money was spent on acquiring the painting "The Snow" by George Hendrik Breitner, a study trip for three Rijksacademie of Amsterdam students, and a small scholarship for Dutch artists living in London.

This decision upset both painters and the general public. This must be seen in the contemporary social context, because the Willink van Collenprijs had become a national institution. As a consequence, a petition to protest this practice was signed by 29 artists, including famous names like Hendrik Willem Mesdag, the brothers Jacob and Willem Maris, Paul Gabriël and Louis Apol. Giving in to the pressure, a competition was organized again in 1896. According to the new rules, there would only be a first prize, and no other places. In the years 1897, 1906, 1909 and 1910, multiple "first prizes" were awarded.

Because of political events, the award could not be written out consistently. After 71 years, it was awarded for the last time in 1950.

== Some themes ==
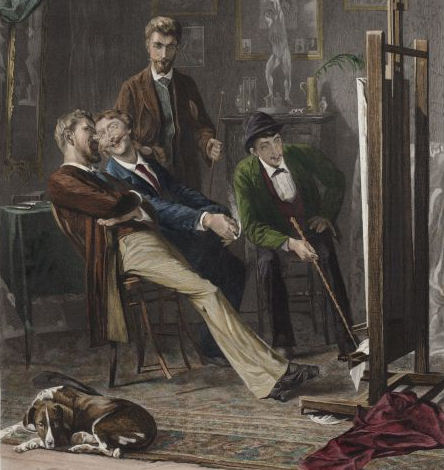
Nicolaas van der Waay (1880): Among friends – the first winner.

Selected topics were expressed

- Among Friends – (1880),
- Genre scene from the Dutch family – (1884),
- Animal piece – (1886),
- Townscape – (1888),
- Figure Painting – (1889),
- A landscape upholstered – (1890),
- In the head – (1891),
- An event in the national history – (1892),
- Flat mural – (1893),
- River face – (1917),
- The life of Willem Zwijger – (1932)
- Summer – (1935).

== List of winners ==
=== Winners 1880–1893 ===
- 1880 Nicolaas van der Waay
- 1881 no first place
- 1882 Ernst Witkamp
- 1883 Jan Hillebrand Wijsmuller
- 1884 Wally Moes
- 1885 Jan Hoynck van Papendrecht
- 1886 Jan Voerman
- 1887 Henry Luyten
- 1888 Willem Bastiaan Tholen
- 1889 Johannes Evert Hendrik Akkeringa
- 1890 Johannes Graadt van Roggen
- 1891 no first place
- 1892 no first place
- 1893 no prize

=== Winners from 1896–1950 ===
- 1896 Marius Bauer
- 1897 Minca Bosch Reitz, Theo Molkenboer, Johan Vlaanderen
- 1898 Gerrit Haverkamp
- 1904 Hendrik Jan Wolter
- 1905 Cornelis Vreedenburgh
- 1906 Barend Polvliet, Lizzy Ansingh
- 1909 Johann Georg van Caspel, Chris van der Hoef, Georg Rueter, David Schulman
- 1910 Elsa Woutersen-van Doesburgh, Marie van Hove, Bernard van Beek, Ed Gerdes
- 1913 Gerard Johan Staller
- 1914 Salomon Garf
- 1917 Nicolas Friedrich Heinrich Cevat
- 1937 Helena Elisabeth Goudeket
- 1939 Theo Kurpershoek
- 1946 Jacob (Jaap) Visser
- 1950 Henk Willemse

== Gallery of the most prize winners ==
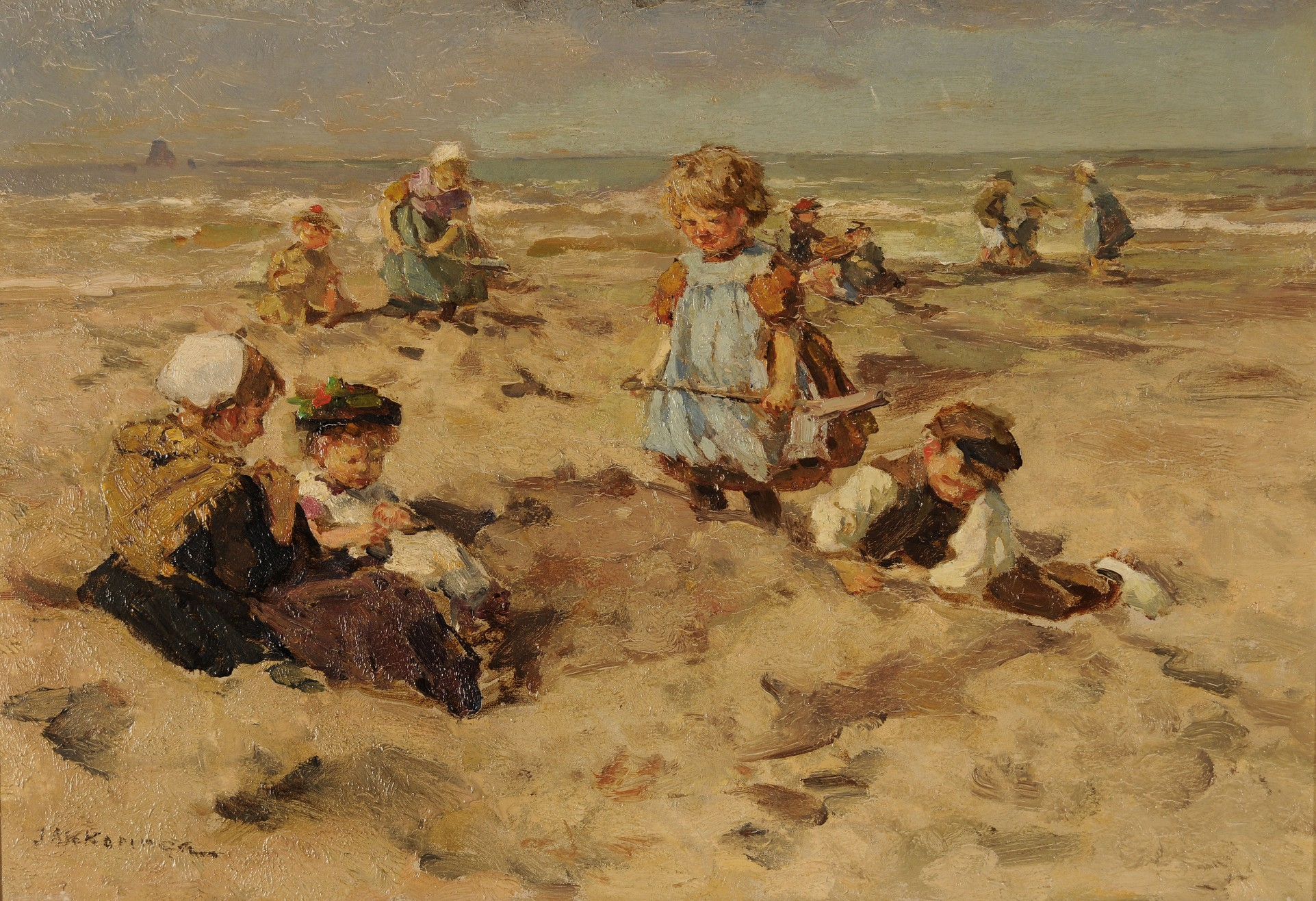
Johannes Akkeringa: Kinderen aan het strand.

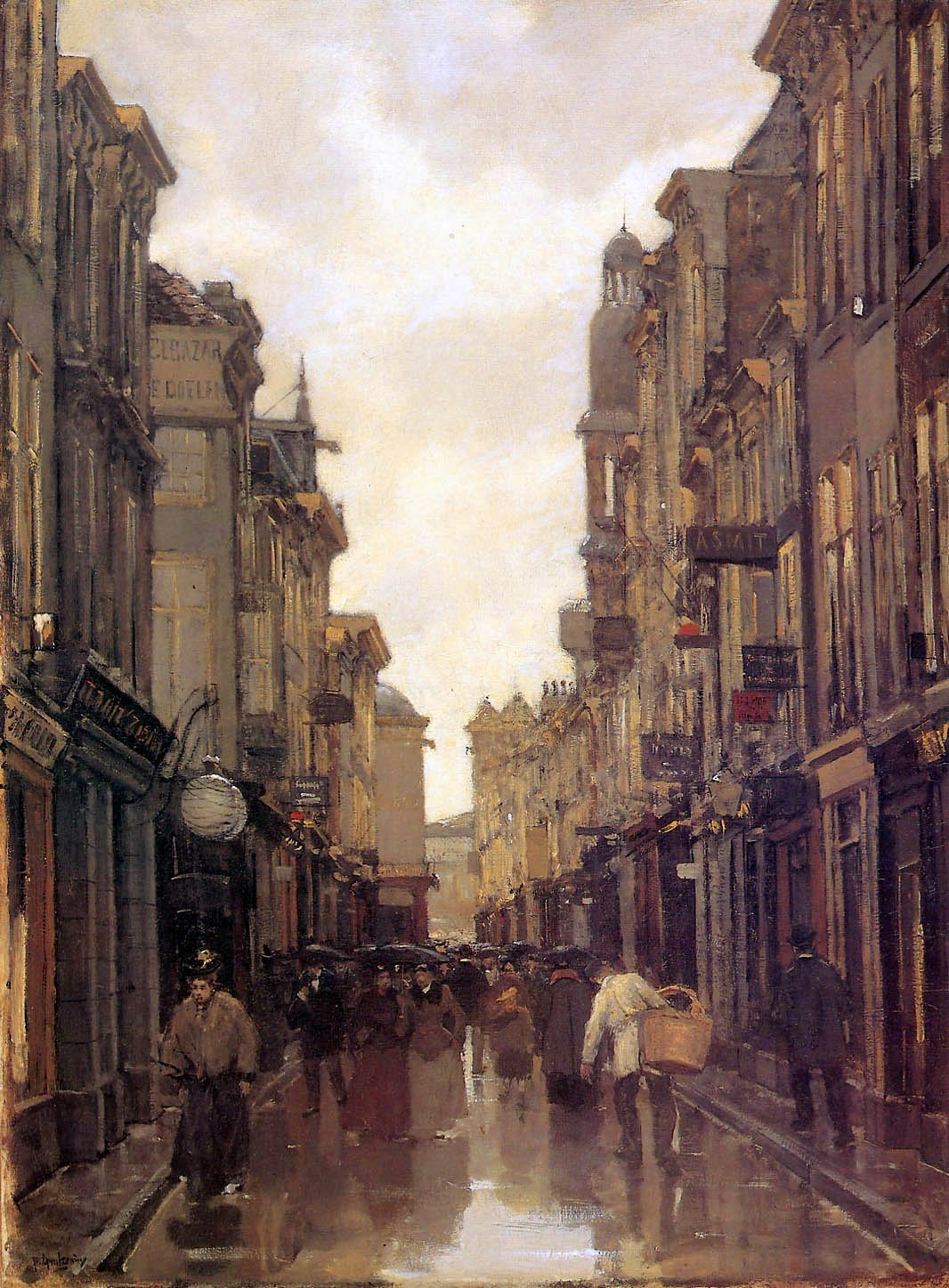
Floris Arntzenius: Spuistraat Den Haag.

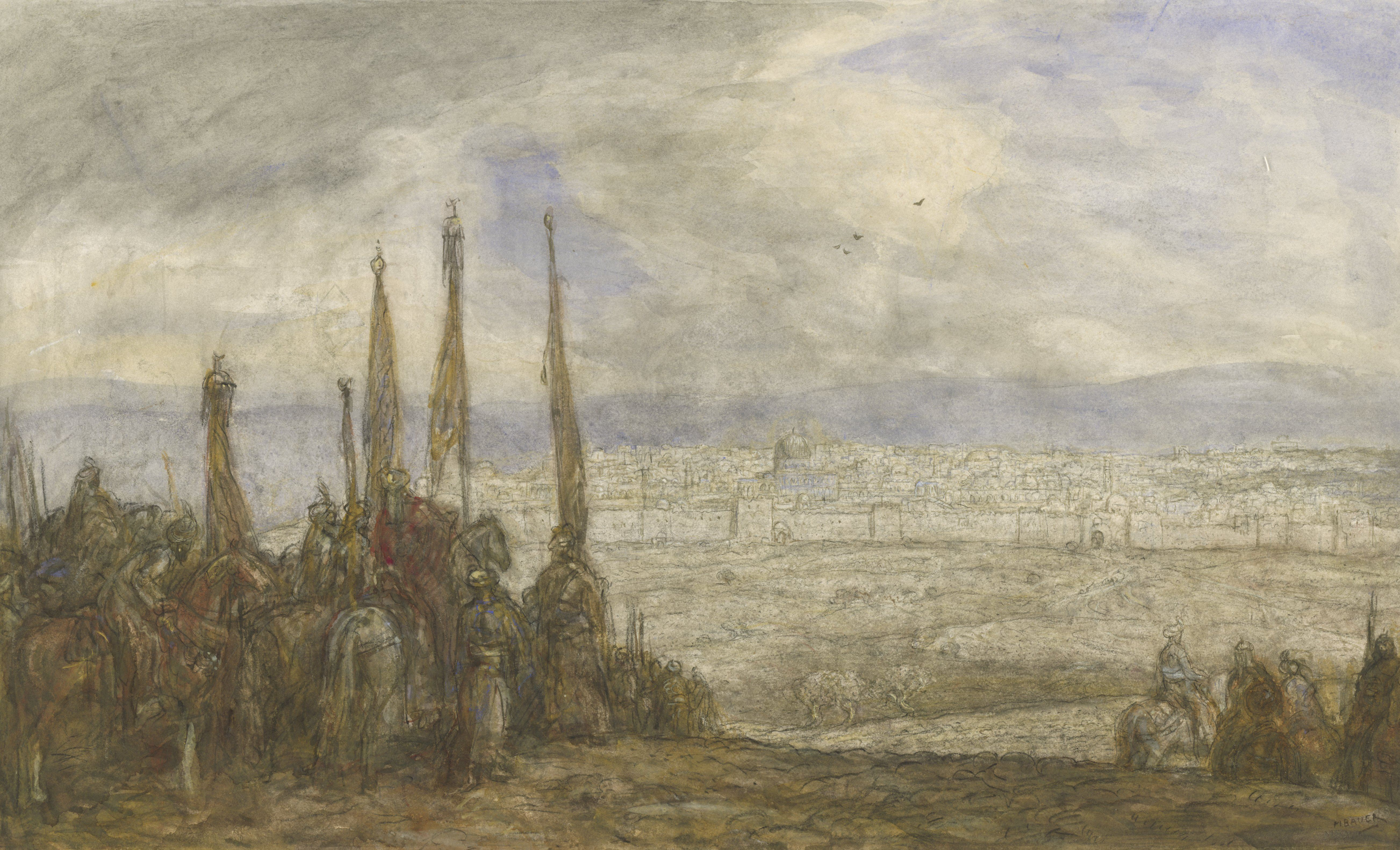
Marius Bauer (Rijksmuseum): Turks leger voor Jeruzalem.

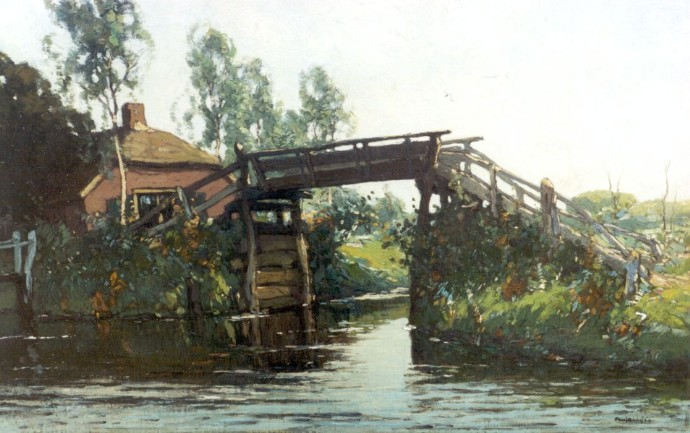
Paul Bodifée: Brug Giethoorn.

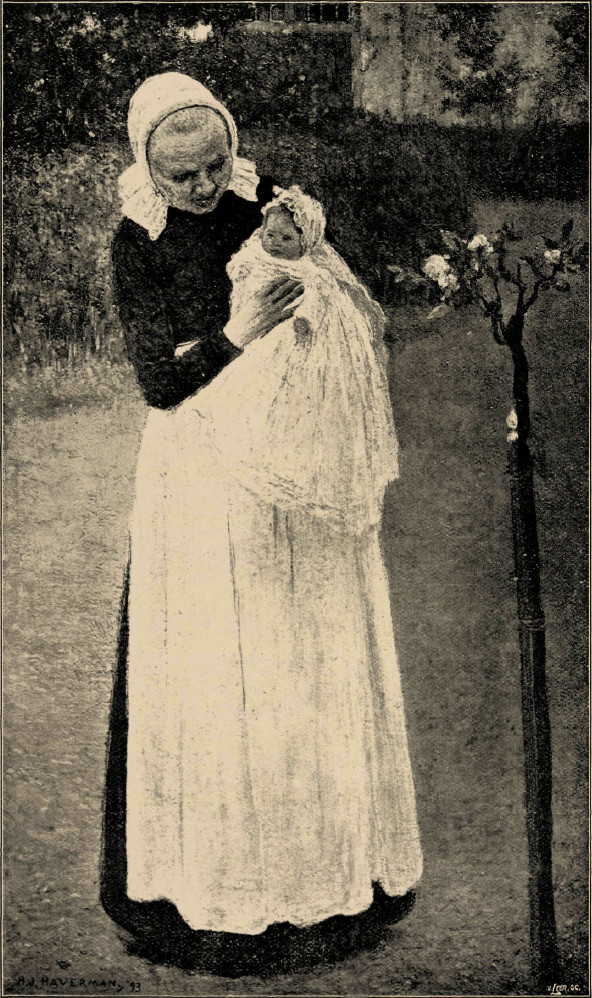
Hendrik Haverman: Young Life.

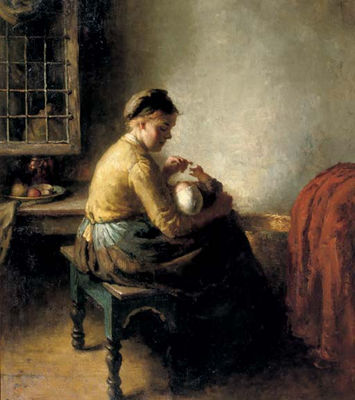
Bernard de Hoog: Wiegen.

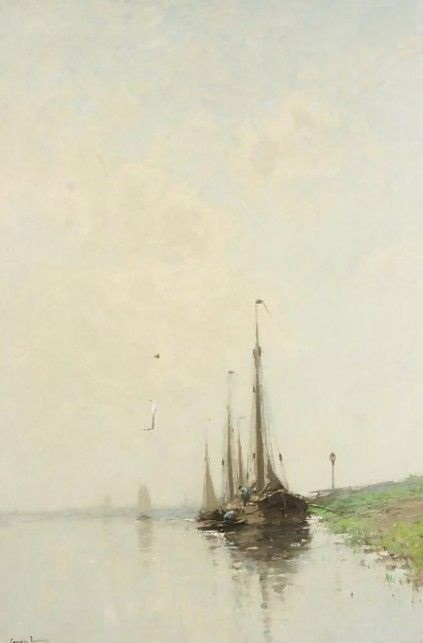
Cornelius Kuypers: Zeilschepen op een kalme rivier.

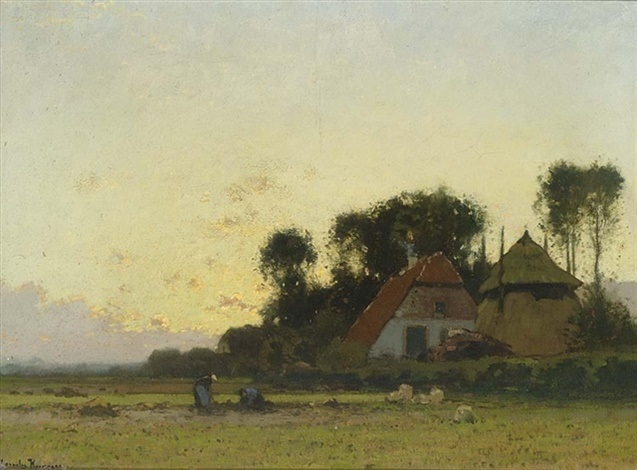
Cornelius Kuypers: Boeren op het veld.

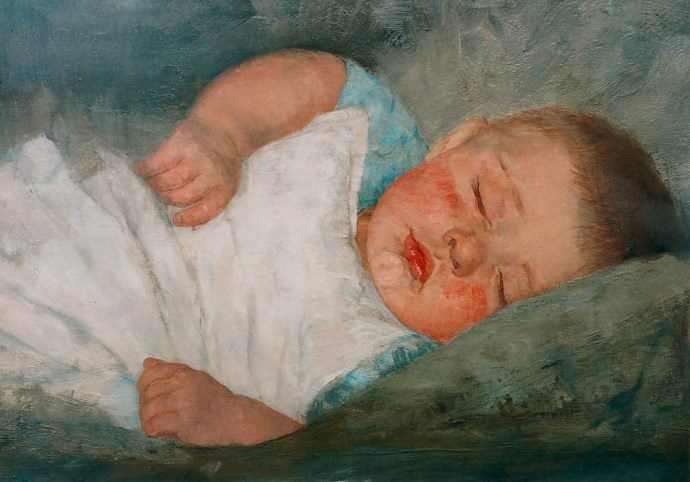
Wally Moes: Sleeping baby.

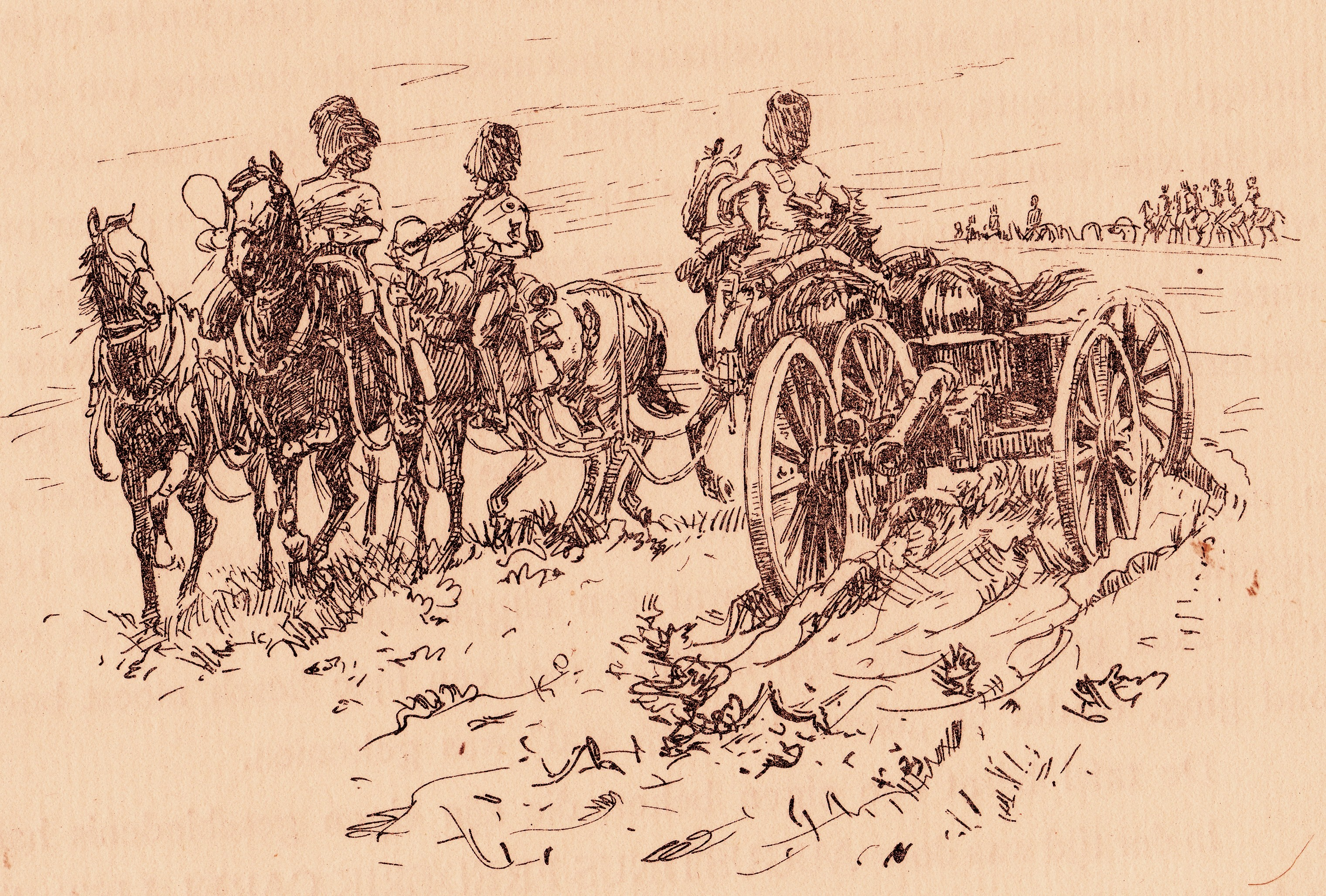
Jan Hoynck van Papendrecht: Artilleristen (2).

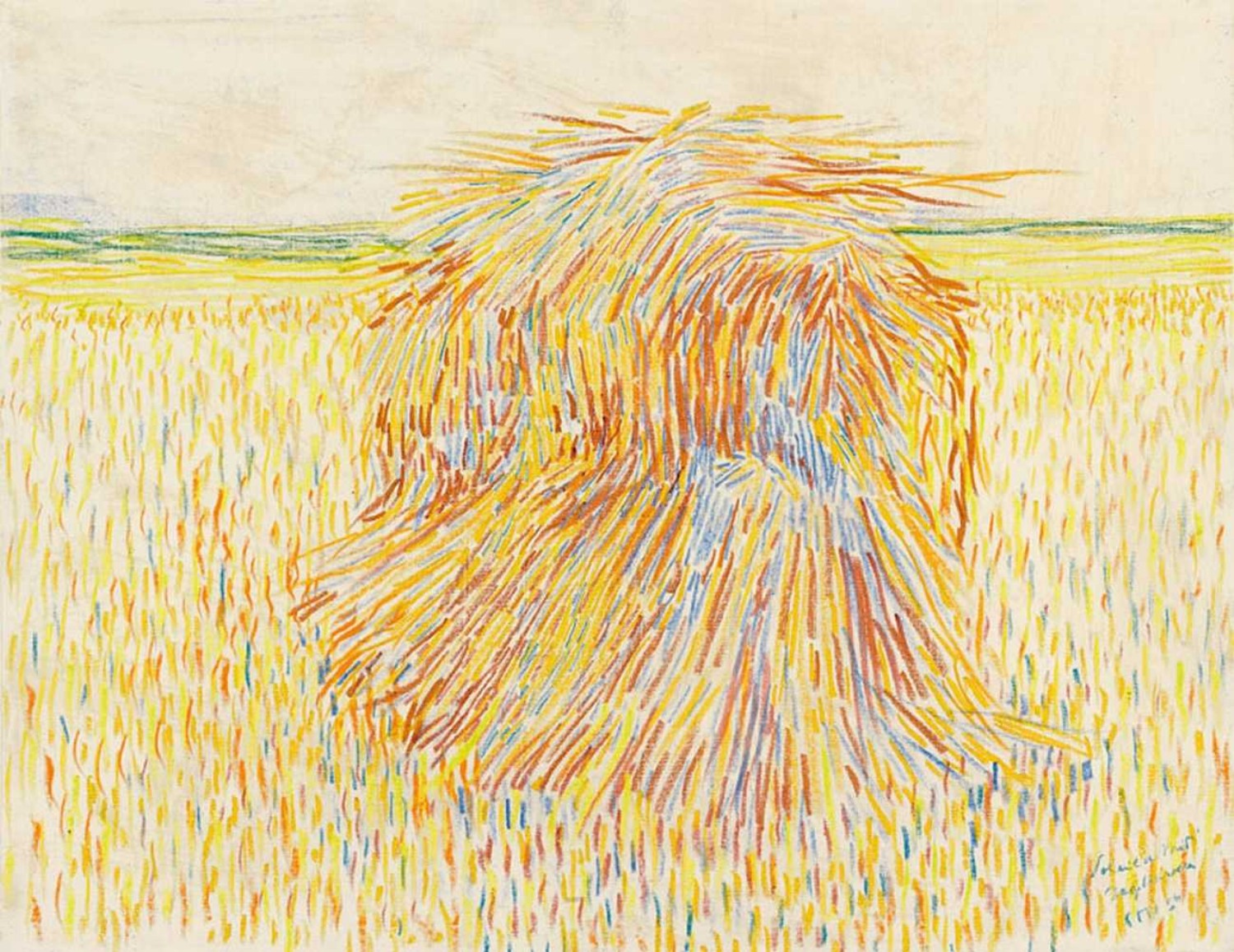
Johan Thorn Prikker: Soleil à midi.

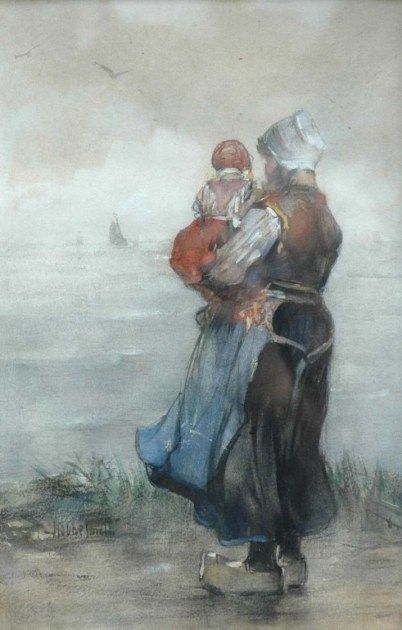
Hobbe Smith: Vissersvrouw.

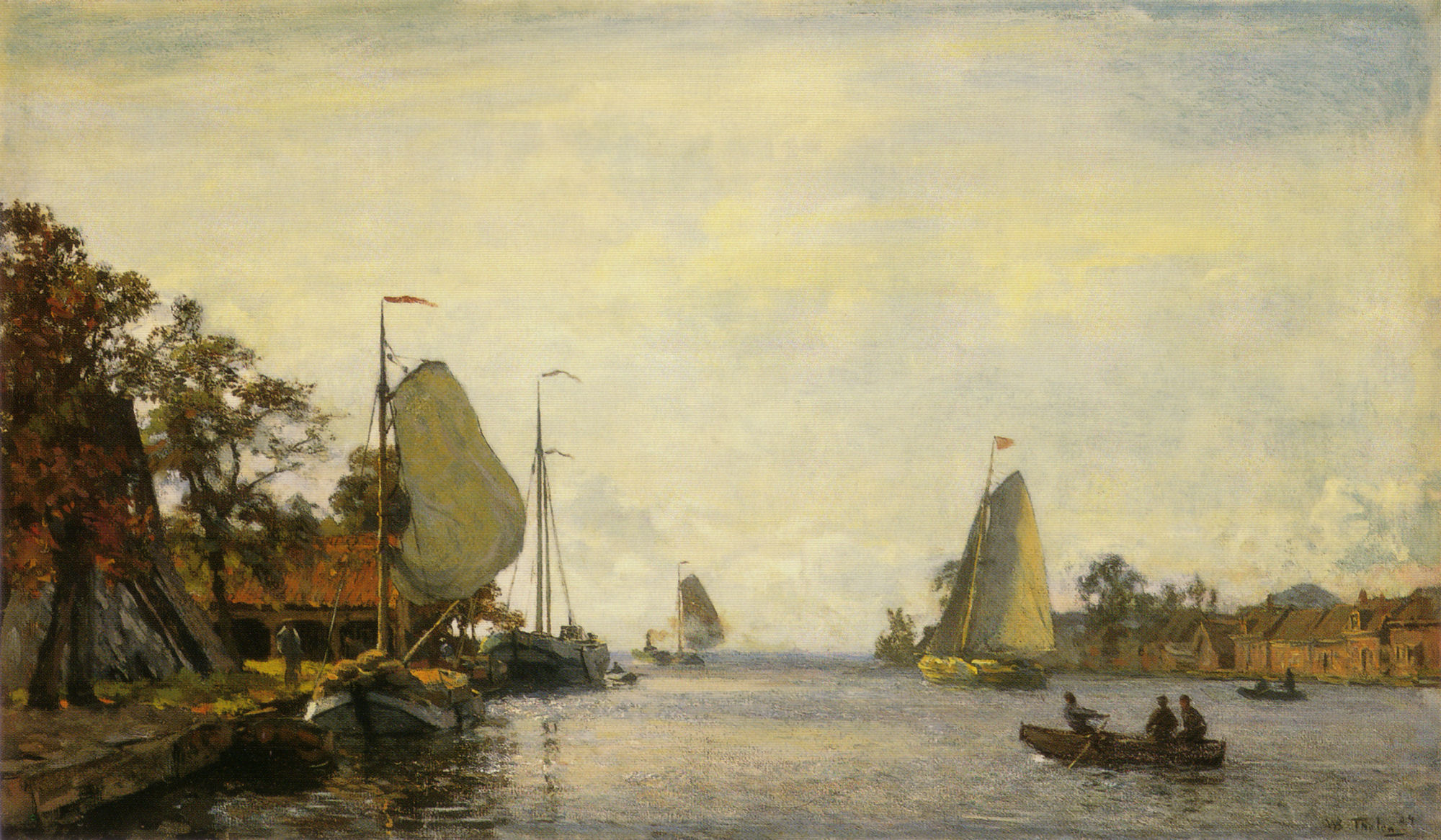
Willem Tholen: Zomers riviergezicht met zeilschepen.

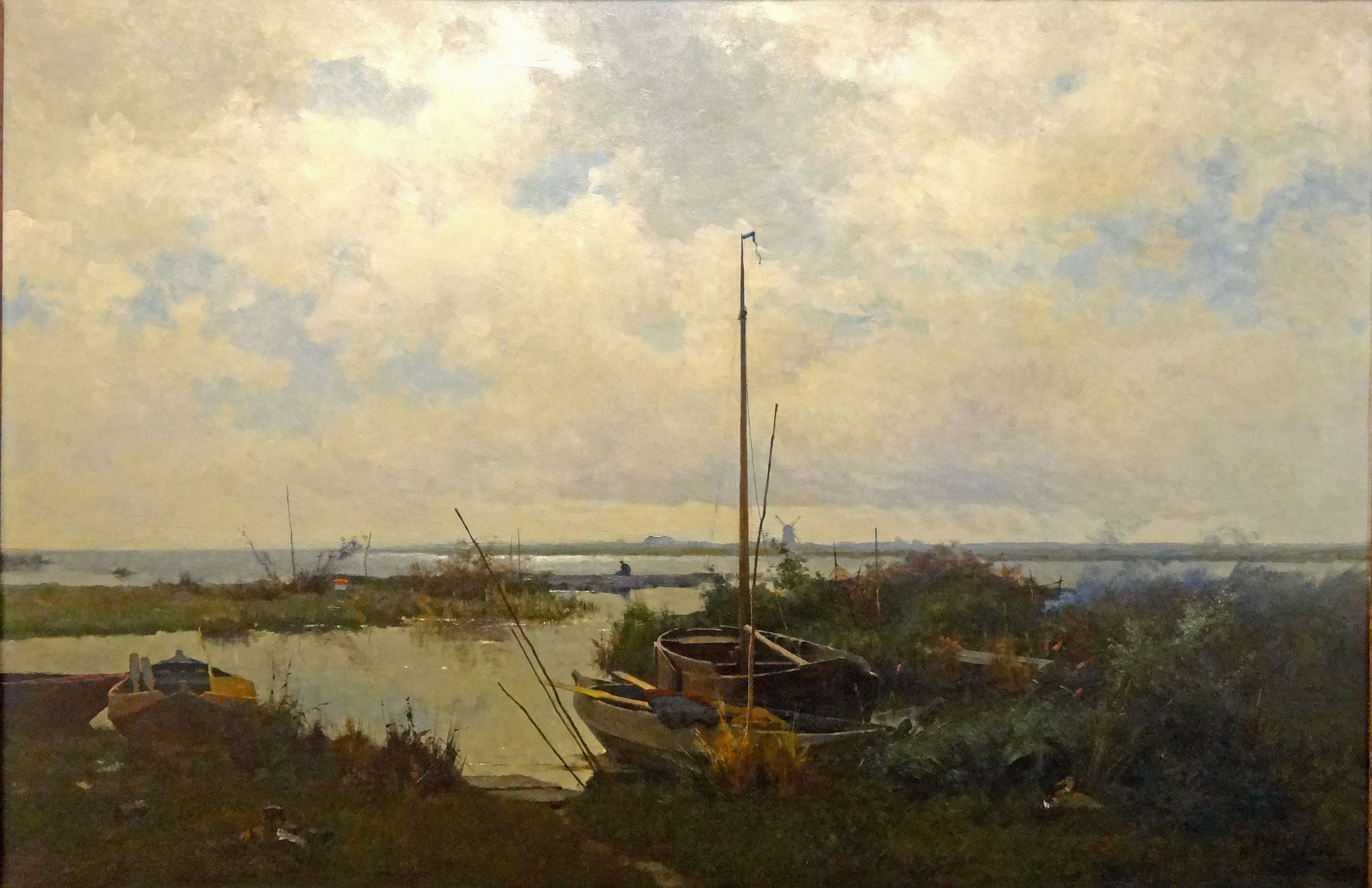
Willem Tholen: Rivierlandschap bij Giethoorn.

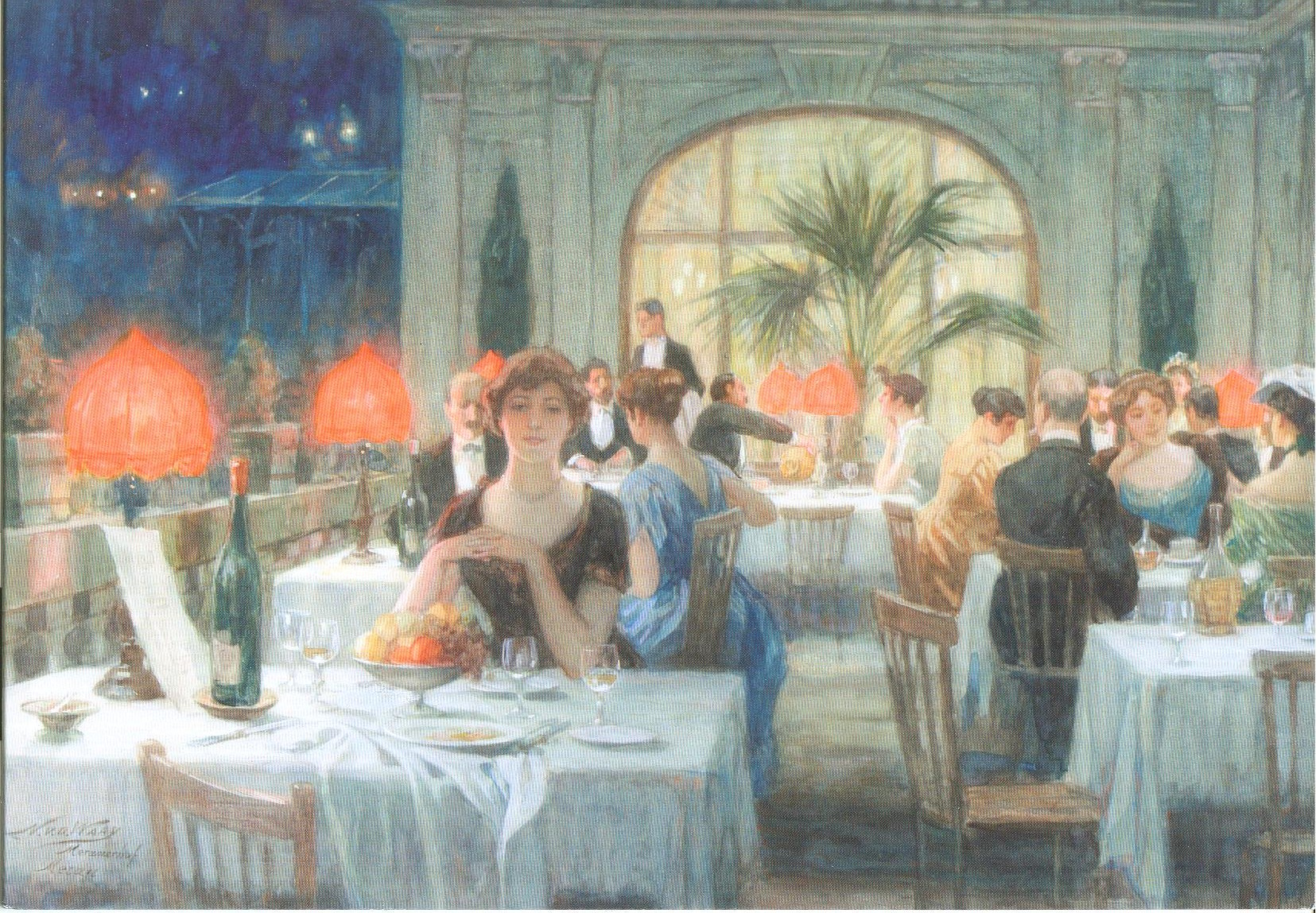
Nicolaas van der Waay: Schilderij Terras.

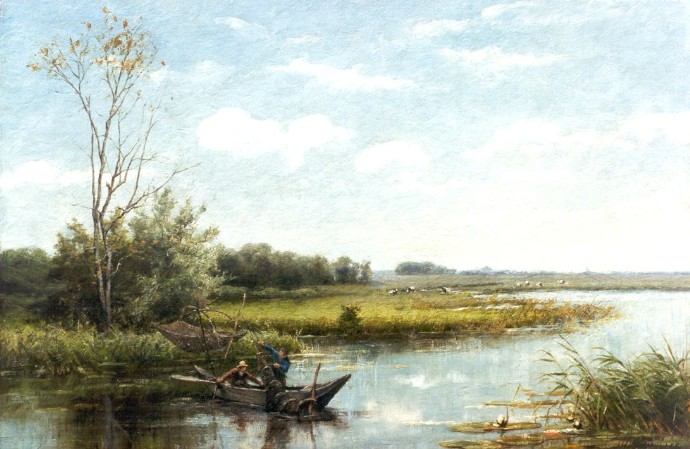
Jan Hillebrand Wijsmuller: Looking at the fishing traps.

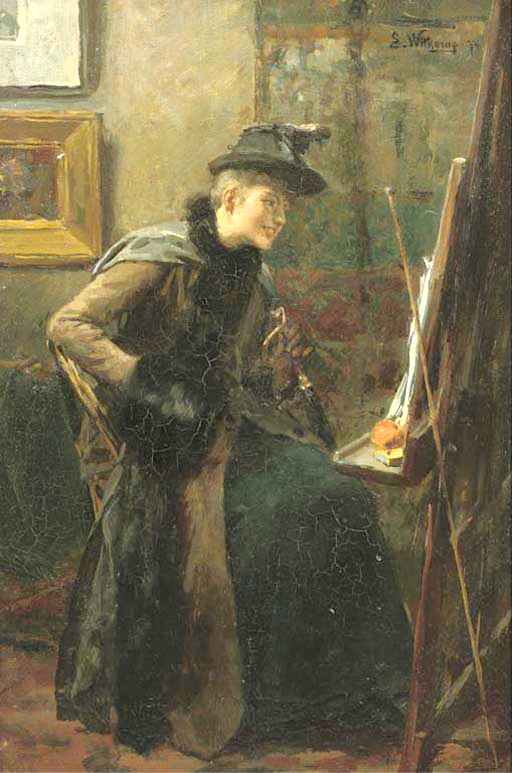
Ernst Witkamp: Bezoek op het atelier.

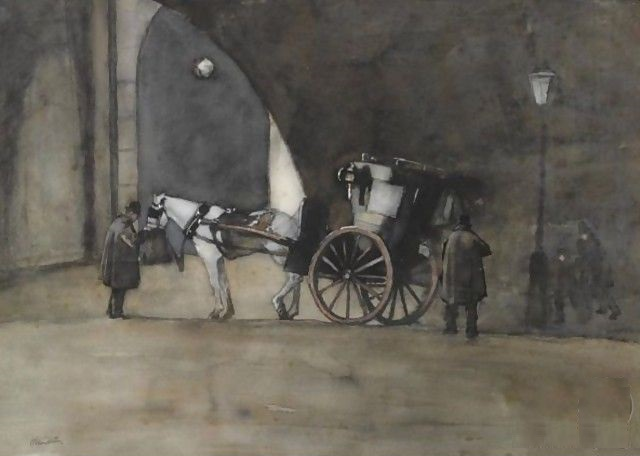
Willem Witsen: A carriage at Waterloo Bridge.

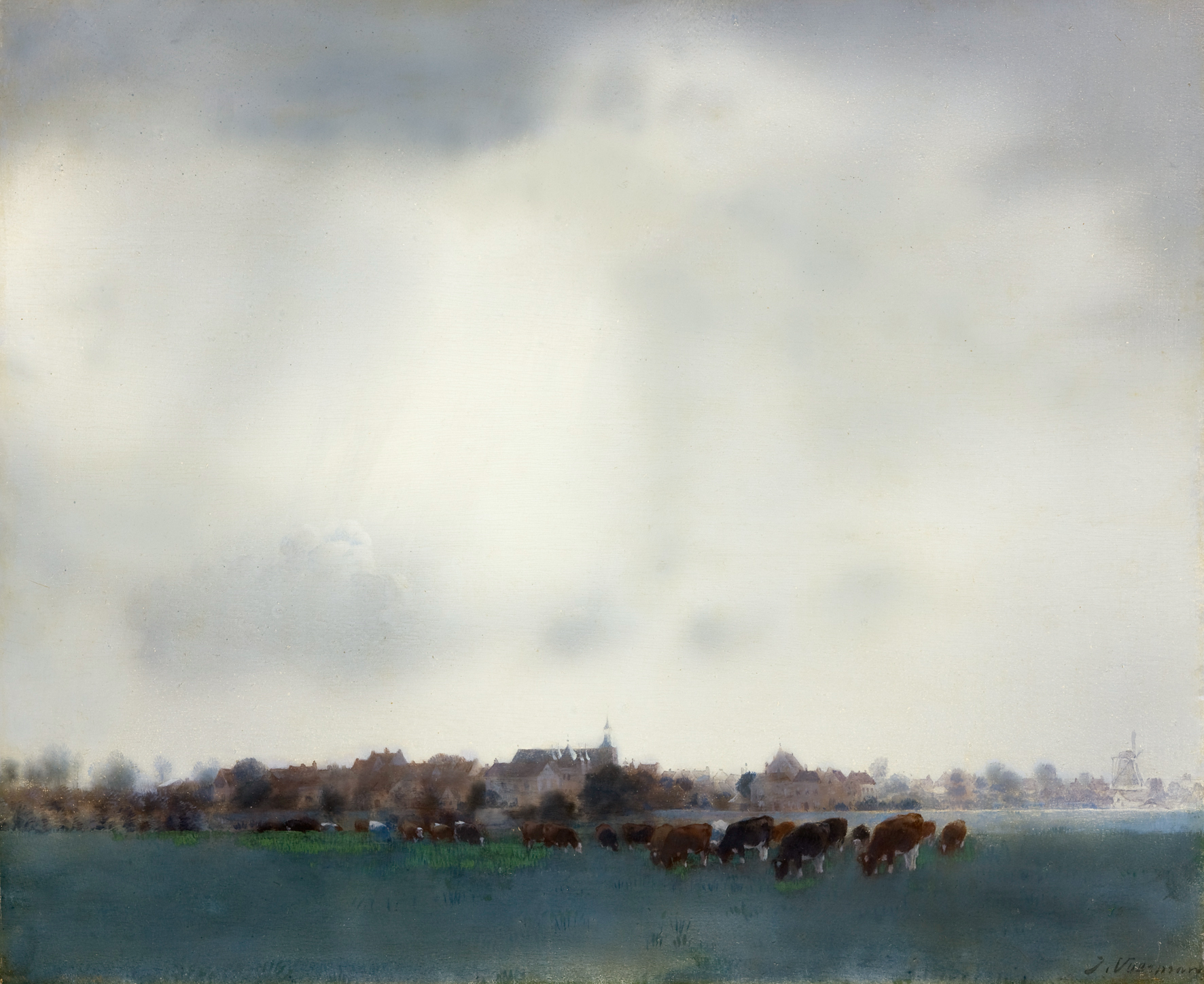
Jan Voerman: View of Hattem.

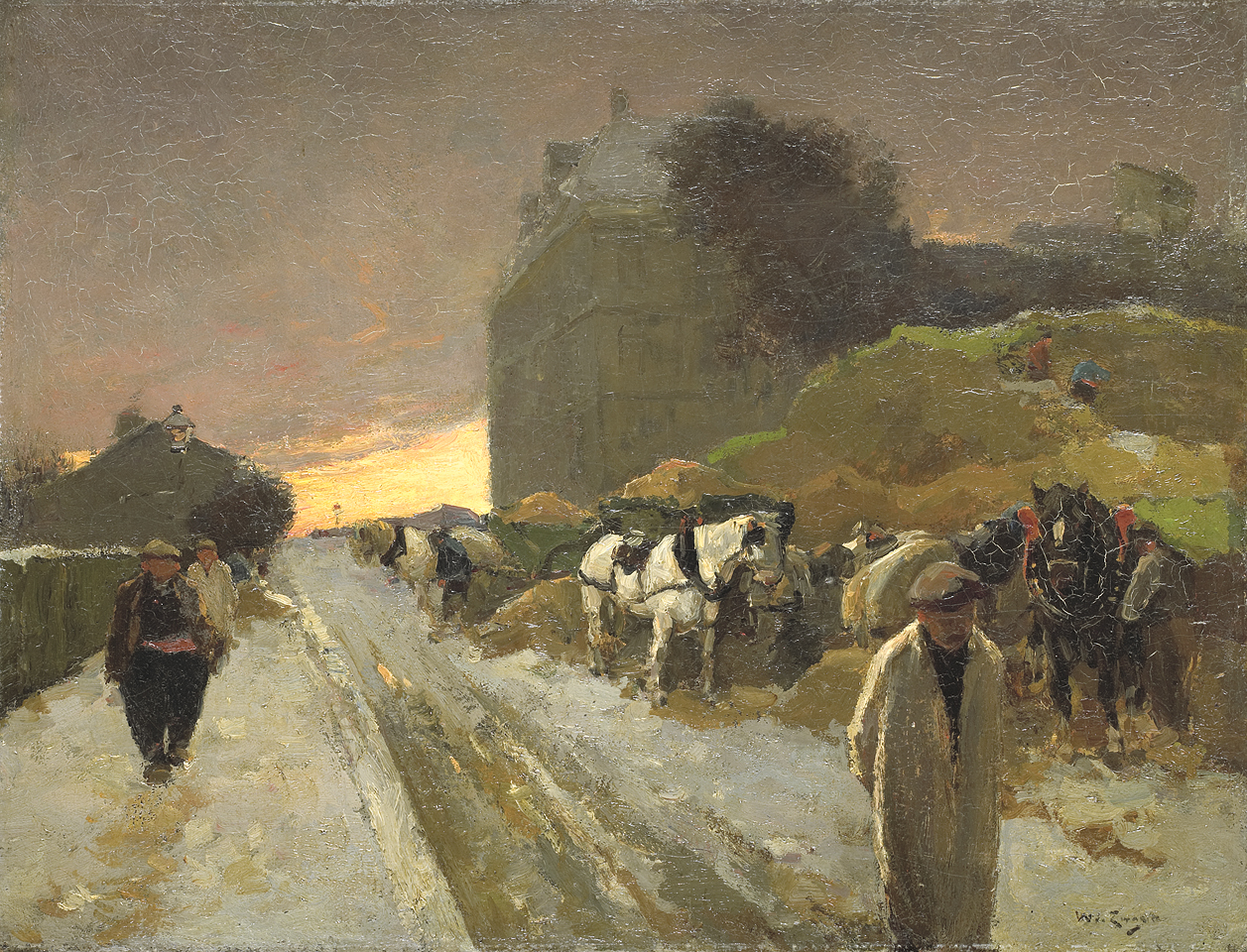
Willem de Zwart (Rijksmuseum): Street at Montmartre.

== Bibliography ==
- Britta Bley: Vom Staat zur Nation: Zur Rolle der Kunst bei der Herausbildung eines Niederländischen Nationalbewußtseins im langen 19. Jahrhundert. LIT-Verlag, Münster 2004, ISBN 3-8258-7902-X.
- De Bodt, Saskia and Sellink, Manfred. Nineteenth Century Dutch Watercolors and Drawings, Museum Boijmans Van Beuningen, Rotterdam, 1998.
- De Leeuw, Ronald et al. The Hague School Dutch Masters of the 19th Century (1983)
- Sillevis, John, Dutch Drawings From the Age of Van Gogh, Taft Museum, Cincinnati, Ohio, 1992.
- Sillevis, John and Tabak, Anne, The Hague School Book, Waanders Uitgegevers, Zwolle, 2004.
- Suyver, Renske. A Reflection of Holland: The Best of the Hague School in the Rijksmuseum (2011)
- Müllerschön, Bernd and Maier, Thomas, Die Maler der Schule von Barbizon – Wegbereiter des Impressionismus, Stuttgart, Ed. Thombe, 2002 ISBN 3-935252-01-3
- Lévêque, Jean-Jaques: L'AUBE DE IMPRESSIONNISME – 1848–1869, ACR, Édition Internationale, Courbevoie, Paris, 2000, ISBN 2-86770-058-2
- Imanse, Geurt: Van Gogh bis Cobra: holländische Malerei 1880–1950. Hatje, 1980, ISBN 3775701605.
