= Elsa Woutersen-van Doesburgh =

Dutch artist

- Born: Elsa Louisa Hannelina van Doesburgh; 7 December 1875; Amsterdam, Netherlands
- Died: 8 March 1957 (aged 81); Bloemendaal, Netherlands
- Known for: Painting

Elsa Woutersen-van Doesburgh (1875-1957) was a Dutch artist.

== Biography ==
Woutersen-van Doesburgh née van Doesburgh was born on 7 December 1875 in Amsterdam. She attended the Quellinusschool, the Académie des Beaux-Arts in Brussels, and the Rijksakademie van beeldende kunsten. Her teachers included August Allebé, Robert von Haug, and Jacob Ritsema. In 1910 she was awarded the Willink van Collenprijs (The Willink van Collen Award). In 1911 she married Wouter Petrus Wouterse. Her work was included in the 1939 exhibition and sale Onze Kunst van Heden (Our Art of Today) at the Rijksmuseum in Amsterdam. She was a member of the Arti et Amicitiae.

Willeboordsel died on 8 March 1957 in Bloemendaal.
