= Minca Bosch Reitz =

Dutch sculptor and author

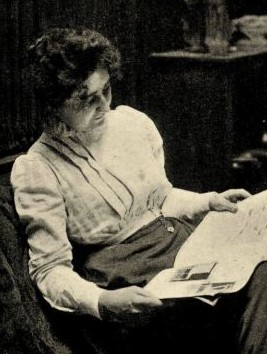
Minca Bosch Reitz at home (1900)

Wilhelmina Maria Bosch Reitz, known as Minca (8 October 1870, Amsterdam – 27 January 1950, Heemstede) was a Dutch sculptor and author.

== Life and work ==
She was born to Charles Bosch Reitz (1829–1879), a member of the Provincial Council of North Holland, and Sara Maria de Balbiaan (1839–1920). Her parents were not married, so she stayed in Amsterdam and was raised by her mother. In 1881, Sara Maria married her brother-in-law, Dirk Anthonij Bosch Reitz (1820–1899). Dirk and Charles were uncles of the painter, Gijs Bosch Reitz.

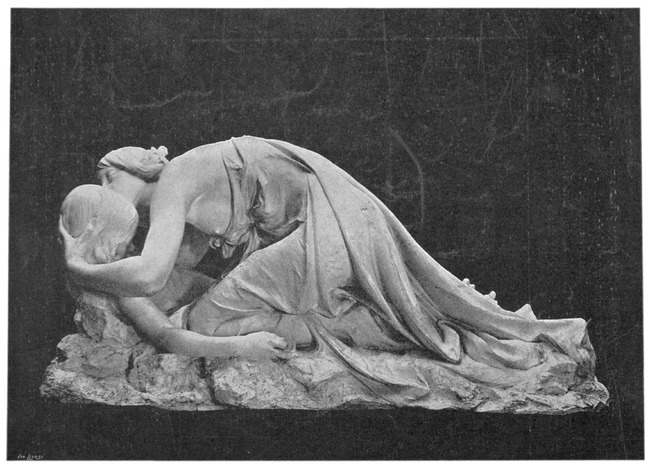
Beyond Consolation

After displaying artistic inclinations, she received sculpture lessons from Georgine Schwartze and Bart van Hove. Most of her works were small figures and reliefs. In 1897, she was awarded the Willink van Collenprijs. She had a studio on the Amsteldijk, which had formerly been occupied by Gerrit Willem Dijsselhof and Maurits van der Valk.

In 1898, she created one of her few large sculptures, depicting a female stone carrier, pushing a wheelbarrow; made specifically for display at the Nationale Tentoonstelling van Vrouwenarbeid. In 2009, a replica of the statue was made by Loek Bos and placed near the site of the old stone factory in Nieuwerkerk. The original has been lost.

She was a member of Arti et Amicitiae and the Kunstenaarsvereniging Sint Lucas. Throughout her twenties and early thirties, she held numerous exhibits, notably at the Tentoonstelling van Levende Meesters and the Exposition Universelle (1900). She was awarded gold medals on four occasions.

In 1902, she married the heraldic scholar, Cornelis Willem Hendrik Verster (1862–1920); younger brother of the painter Floris Verster, whom she had met at an exhibition in Arnhem, when he was working as a curator for the Museum De Lakenhal and offered to help her set up her exhibitions.

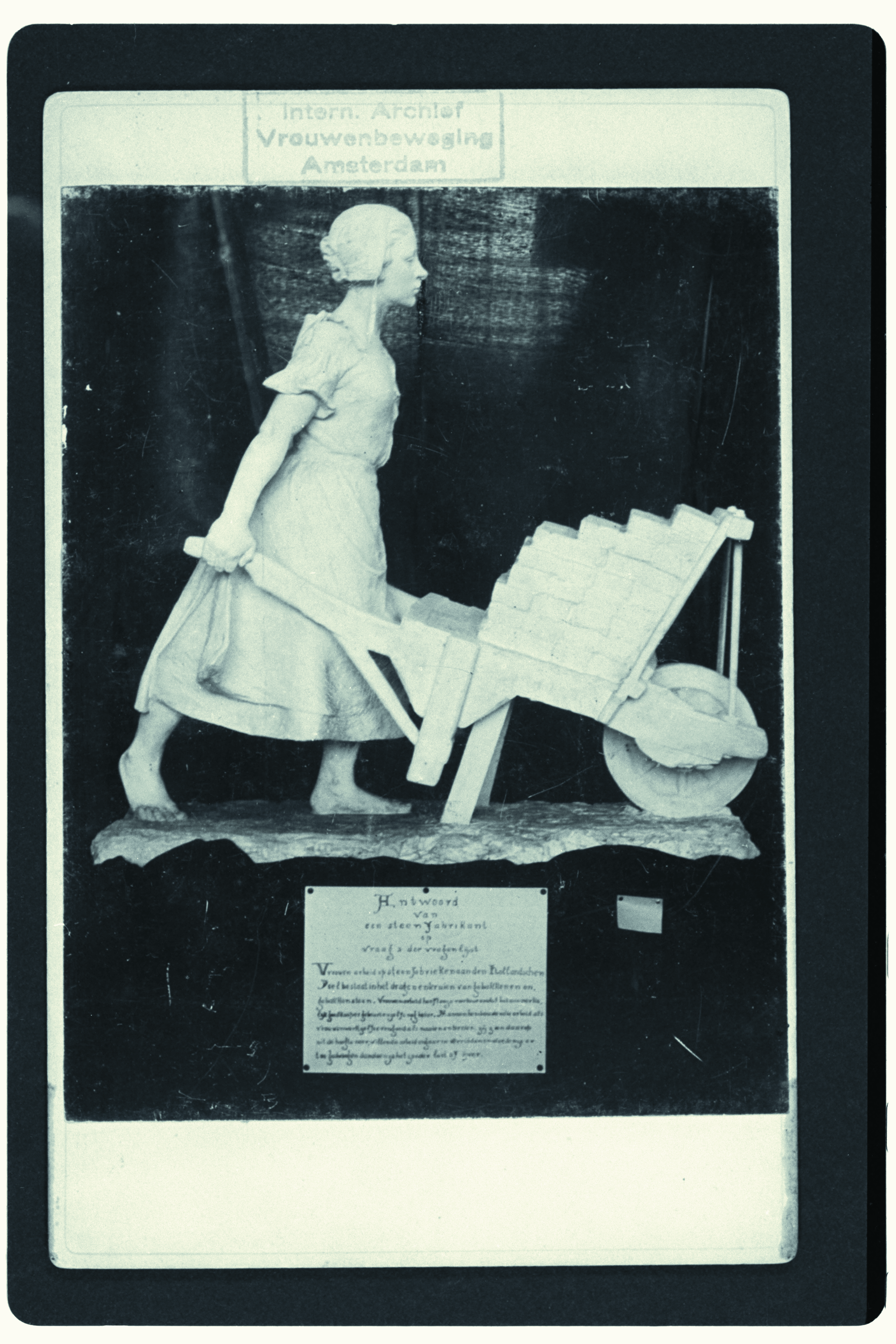
The Stone Carrier

After her marriage, possibly due to a poor market for sculpture, she began to focus on writing and sculpted little. She published novels and series for magazines such as Astra (a bimonthly magazine of the Youth Association for Astronomy) and Nova (a news magazine).
