= Salomon Garf =

Dutch painter and graphic designer (1879-1943)

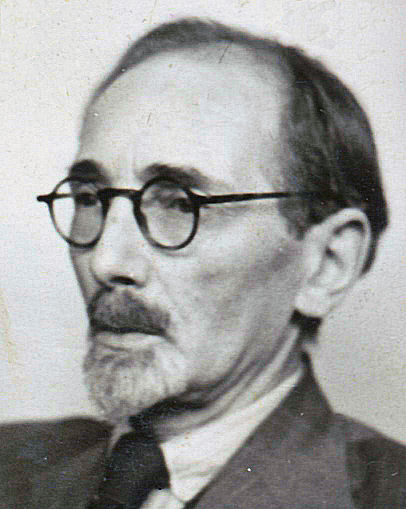
Salomon Garf (passport photograph)

Salomon Garf (6 December 1879 – 27 August 1943) was a Dutch painter and graphic artist; known for his portraits and still lifes. He was murdered in the Holocaust.

== Biography ==
He was born to a family of diamond merchants and his father worked as a stockbroker. Rather than follow in the family business, he chose a career in art, studying at the "Institute for Applied Arts" (1892–1895), the "State Normal School for Applied Arts" (1895–1899) and the Rijksakademie (1899–1905), where he worked with August Allebé and Nicolaas van der Waay. In 1904, he entered the Prix de Rome with his depiction of the Raising of the son of the woman of Shunem, but the prize went to Jan Sluijters.

After graduating, he moved to the artists' colony in Laren and was married there two years later. In 1914, he won the Willink van Collenprijs for a painting of his studio. That same year, he and his family moved back to Amsterdam. In Laren, he had focused on painting rural interiors and still lifes. Once he had become established in Amsterdam, he mostly produced portraits and interior scenes with elegantly dressed women. His wife died in 1928, and he never remarried. He was a member of Arti et Amicitiae and, in 1933, was awarded their golden medal on behalf of Queen Wilhelmina. Garf's work was included in the 1939 exhibition and sale Onze Kunst van Heden (Our Art of Today) at the Rijksmuseum in Amsterdam.

In 1938, he became a member of Arti's Board of Directors, but was expelled from the organization in 1941, by orders of the German occupation command. He then became active in the Resistance, helping to forge false "Persoonsbewijzen" (Identity Cards). On August 6, 1943, he was arrested and sent to Auschwitz, by way of the Westerbork transit camp, and was murdered. His students managed to save the contents of his studio before they were confiscated.

== Selected paintings ==
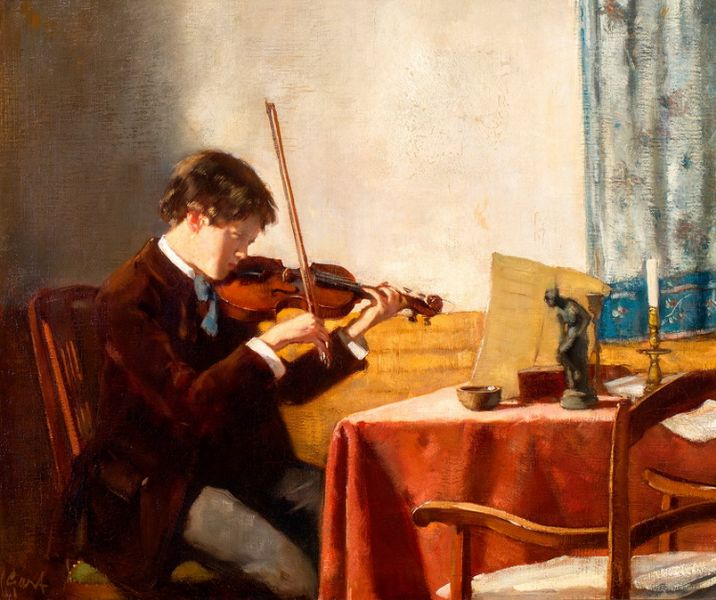
Hans Kindler
as a Young Violinist

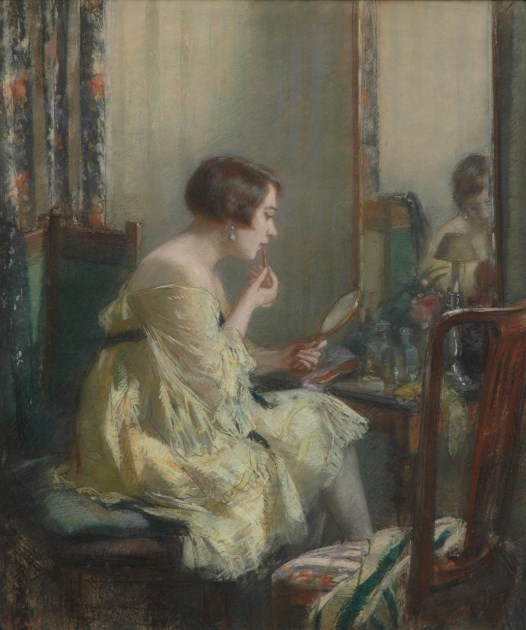
Woman Making her Toilet

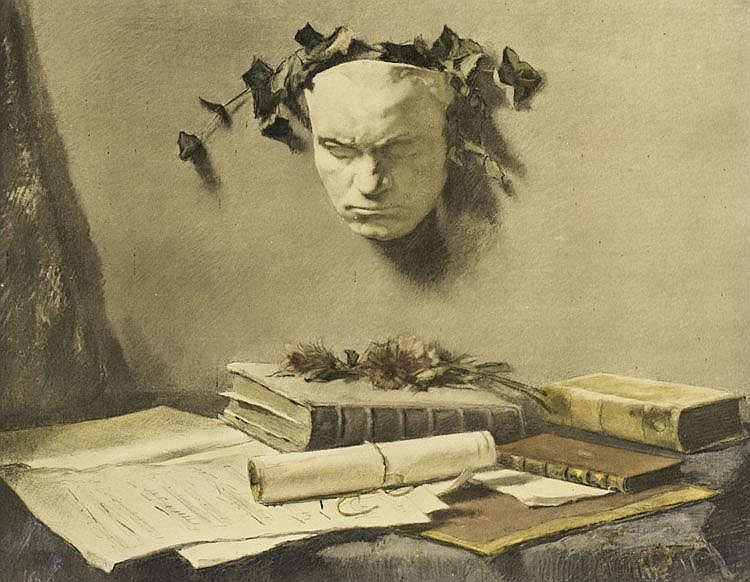
Still-life with Beethoven Mask

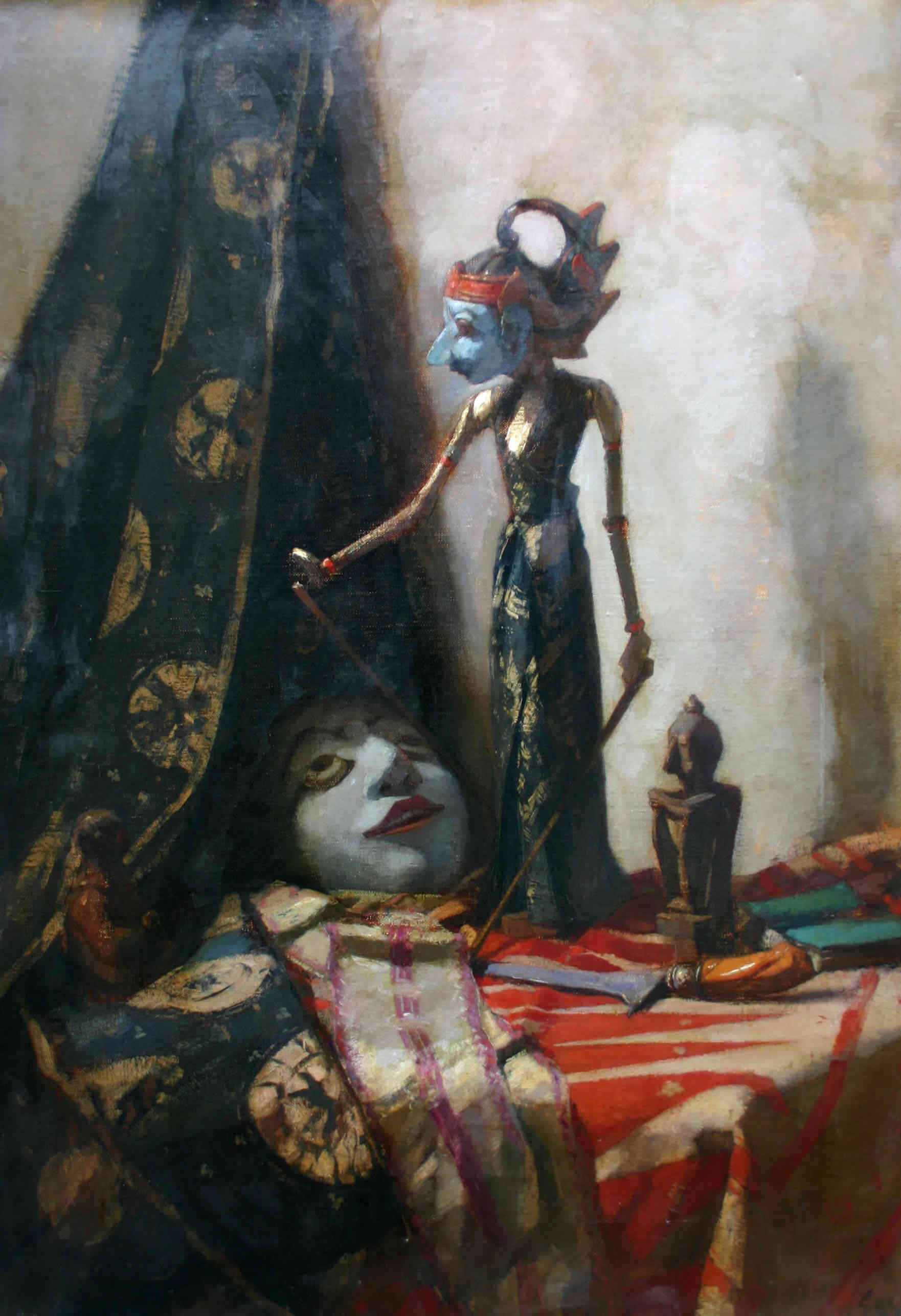
Still-life with Wayang
