= Helena Elisabeth Goudeket =

Dutch painter and illustrator (1910-1943)

- Born: 10 January 1910; Amsterdam
- Died: 9 April 1943 (aged 33); Sobibór extermination camp

Helena (Lenie) Elisabeth Goudeket (1910 – 1943) was a Dutch painter and illustrator.

Goudeket was born in Amsterdam as the daughter of the lawyer Isaäc Goudeket and Catharina Spreekmeester, who lived on the Nicolaas Witsenkade 5. She was educated at the Instituut voor Kunstnijverheidsonderwijs in Amsterdam and the Rijksakademie van beeldende kunsten where she was a pupil of Johannes Hendricus Jurres and Hendrik Jan Wolter. She became a member of the Vereniging Sint Lucas in Amsterdam and Kunst Zij Ons Doel in Haarlem. Goudeket's work was included in the 1939 exhibition and sale Onze Kunst van Heden (Our Art of Today) at the Rijksmuseum in Amsterdam. Like others influenced by the Amsterdamse Joffers she is considered a member of the "Jonge Amsterdamse Joffers". She was awarded the Willink van Collenprijs in 1937. Goudeket's works can be found in the collections of surviving family members, the Joods Historisch Museum and the Amsterdam city archives.

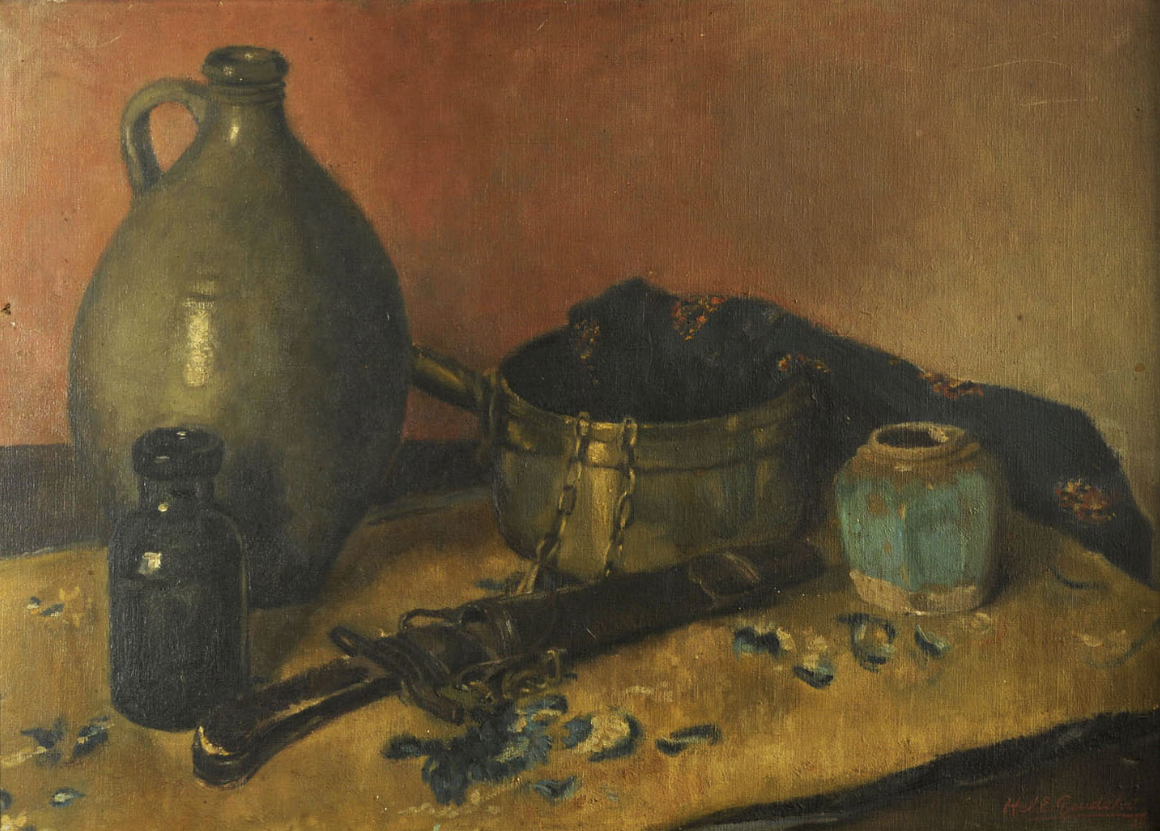
Still-life

Goudeket married Johan Gerard van Hessen on 30 December 1936 in Amsterdam, but divorced him on 24 April 1940, just before the Battle of the Netherlands began the German occupation. On 9 June 1940 she moved to Heemstede to live with her sister Rebecca and set up a workshop in her garage on Molenlaan 3. A year later she returned to Amsterdam, presumably because she, Rebecca and other family members were forced into hiding. Rebecca survived the war, but Lenie, her sister Florence (a sculptor in Heemstede), and Florence's one-year-old son, were killed with their parents in Sobibór extermination camp. Her work was exhibited as part of the exhibition "Rebel, mijn hart" in 1995. Her name is one of the 162 engraved on the Jewish memorial monument in Heemstede.

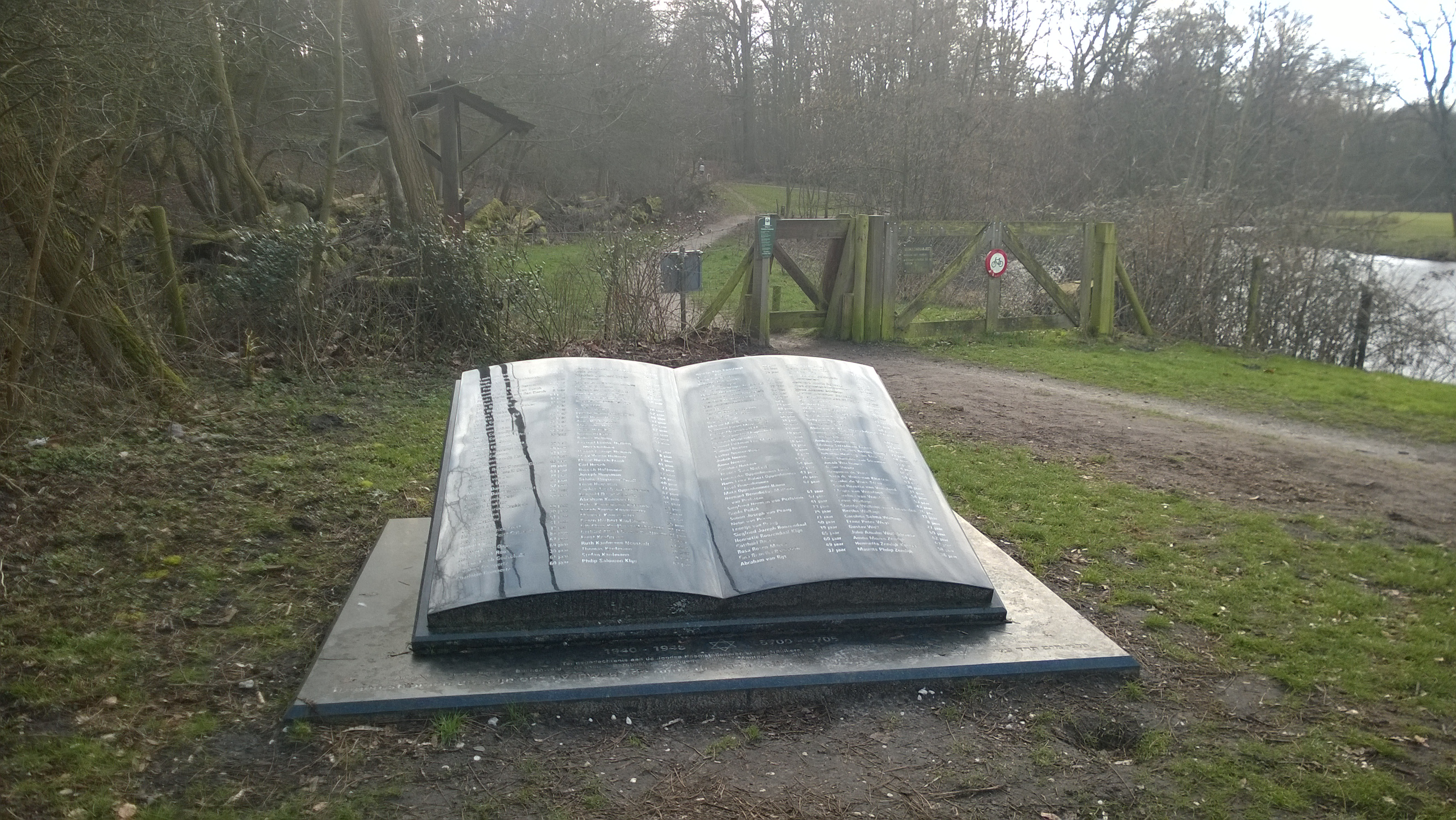
Jewish WWII monument in Heemstede

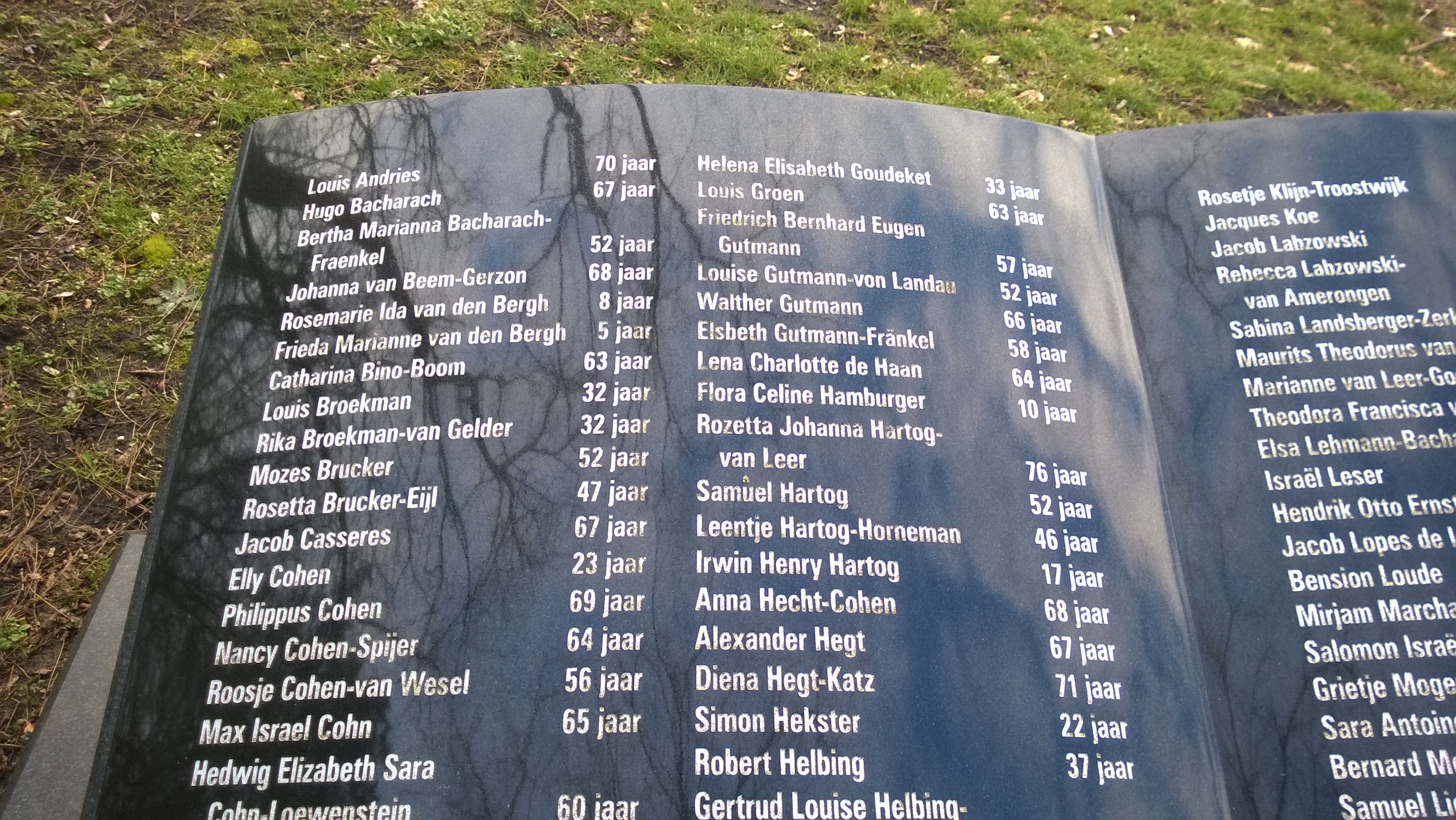
Goudeket's name at the top of the left column of 162 names
