= Nicolaas van der Waay =

Dutch artist

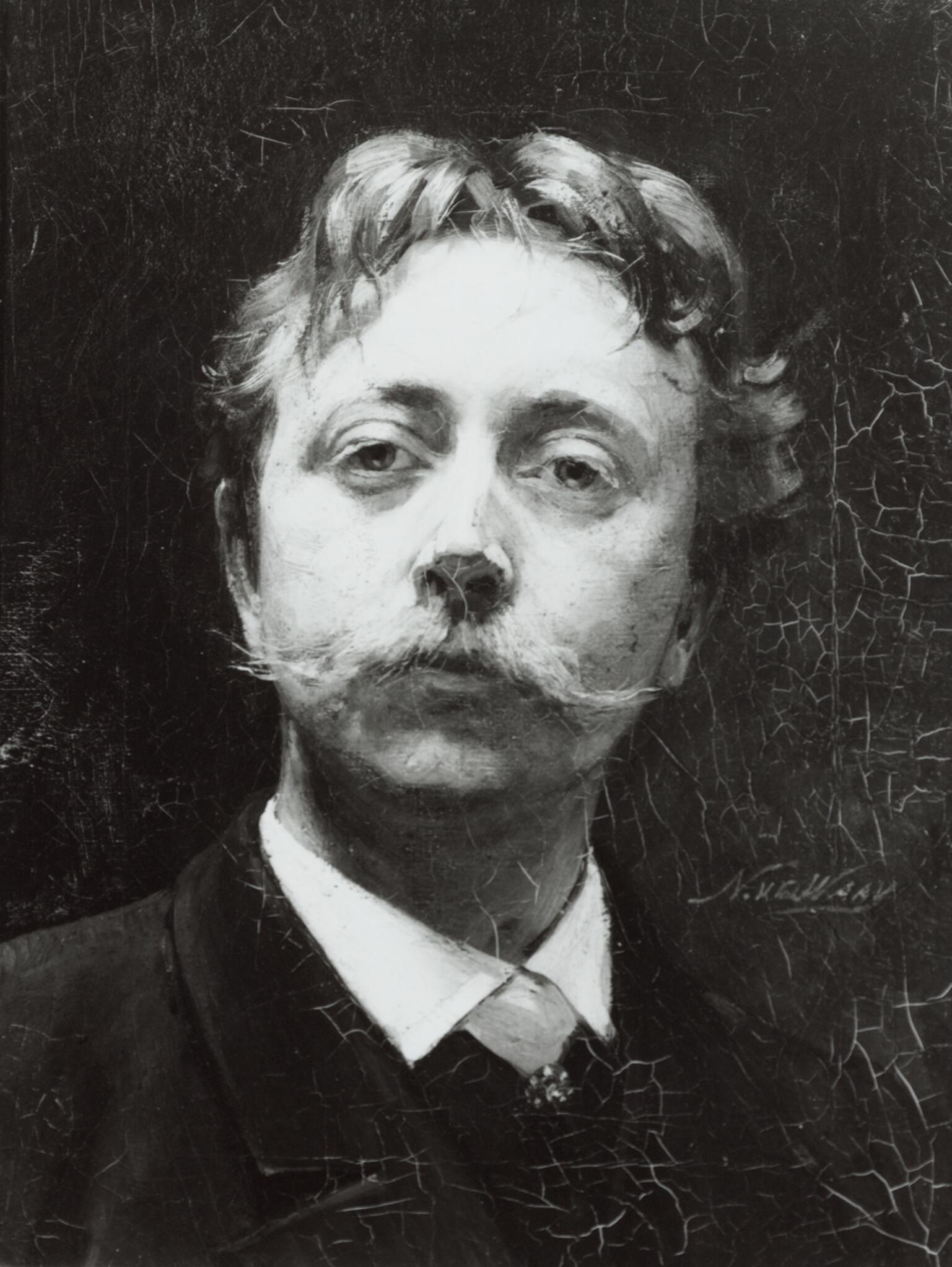
- Self-portrait, c.1890
- Born: 15 October 1855; Amsterdam
- Died: 18 December 1936 (aged 81); Amsterdam
- Occupation: Artist

Nicolaas van der Waay (1855–1936) was a Dutch decorative artist, watercolorist and lithographer. He worked in many genres, including stamp, coin and banknote designs. He is perhaps best known for the allegorical illustrations he created for the Golden Coach and a series of paintings depicting the lives of girls from the Amsterdam Orphanage. His work was also part of the painting event in the art competition at the 1928 Summer Olympics.

== Biography ==
His first drawing lessons came from Louis Koopman (1827-1877), whose daughter he would later marry. He then enrolled at the Rijksacademie, where he studied from 1871 to 1875. After graduating, he shared a workshop with one of his classmates, Jan Hillebrand Wijsmuller. In 1880, the Arti et Amicitiae society awarded him their first Willink van Collenprijs for his painting "Among Friends". He then moved into a larger studio with Ernst Witkamp, who had also been a student of Koopman's and, a few years later, was able to establish his own.

In 1883, he entered the competition for the Prix de Rome, but no prize was awarded that year due to an insufficient number of entries. Instead, August Allebé was able to obtain a ministerial grant that enabled him to make a study trip to Italy. On his return, he became a lecturer at the Rijksacademie; a position he held for thirty years. In 1891, he was named a Professor, succeeding Barend Wijnveld, who had retired, and remained in that position until his own retirement in 1927. Around 1900, he came under the influence of Isaac Israëls, adopting a freer brushstroke and more Impressionistic style.

He also did book illustrations, notably for The Enchanted Ravine, a work of juvenile fiction by Cora van Berckel-van Heek (1840-1920). In 1915, he did watercolor illustrations for the Festschrift dedicated to Coenraad Kerbert, the Director of Artis.

In 1922, he joined the "Maatschappij voor Kunst en Kunstverlangenden", a new organization founded by the painter Jan de Boer. Its goal was to bring art to the "common people" at affordable prices. Among his best known students were Lizzy Ansingh, Tjeerd Bottema, Piet Mondriaan and Jan Sluijters.

== Selected paintings ==
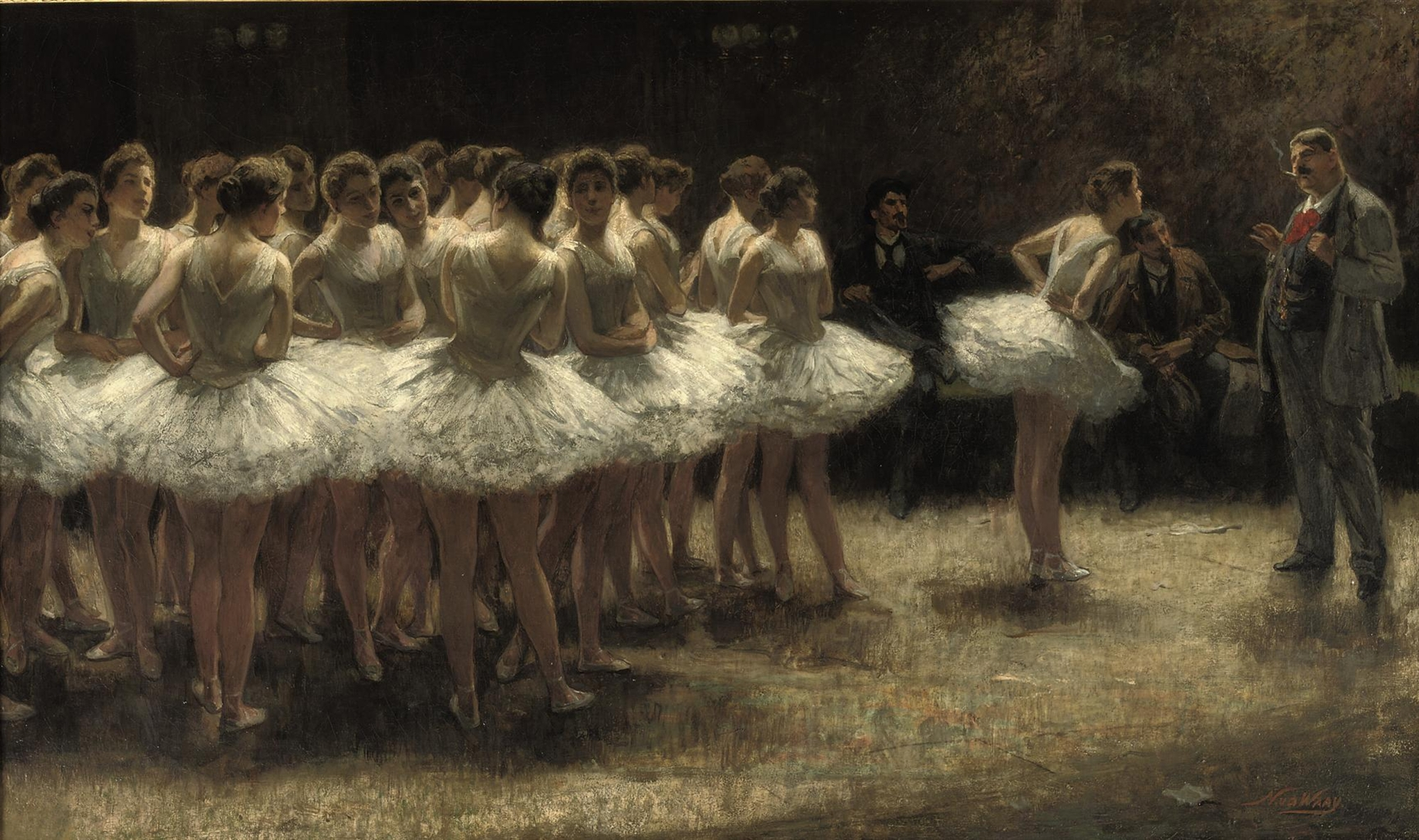
Strike of the Ballerinas

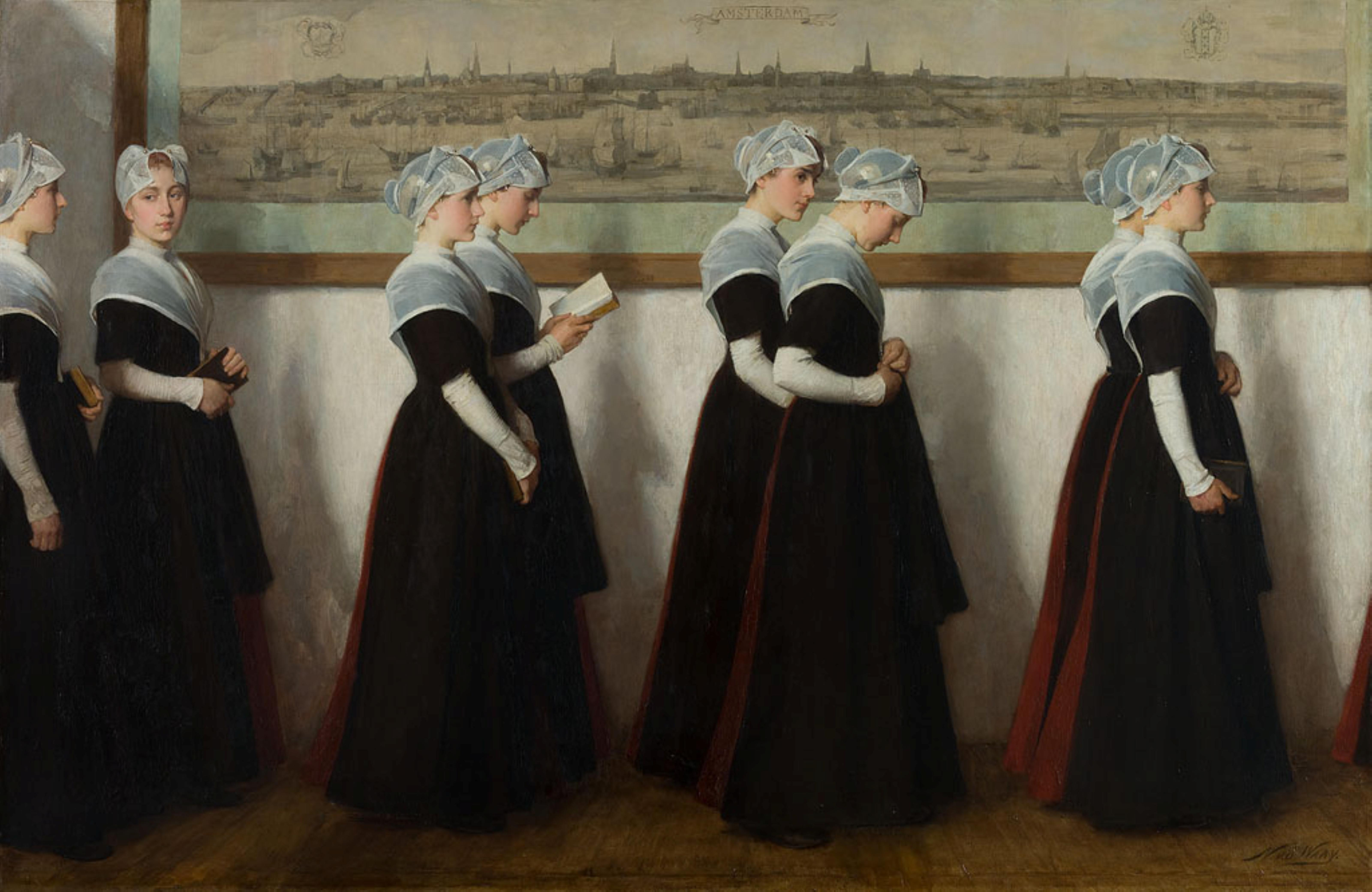
Orphan Girls Going to Church

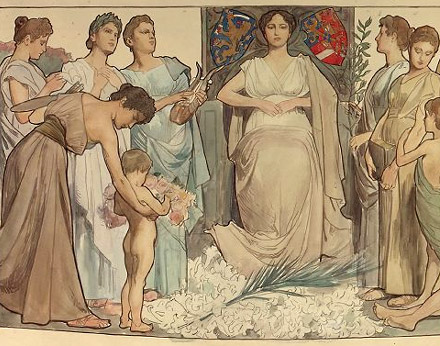
Detail from the drawing for the right door of the Golden Coach

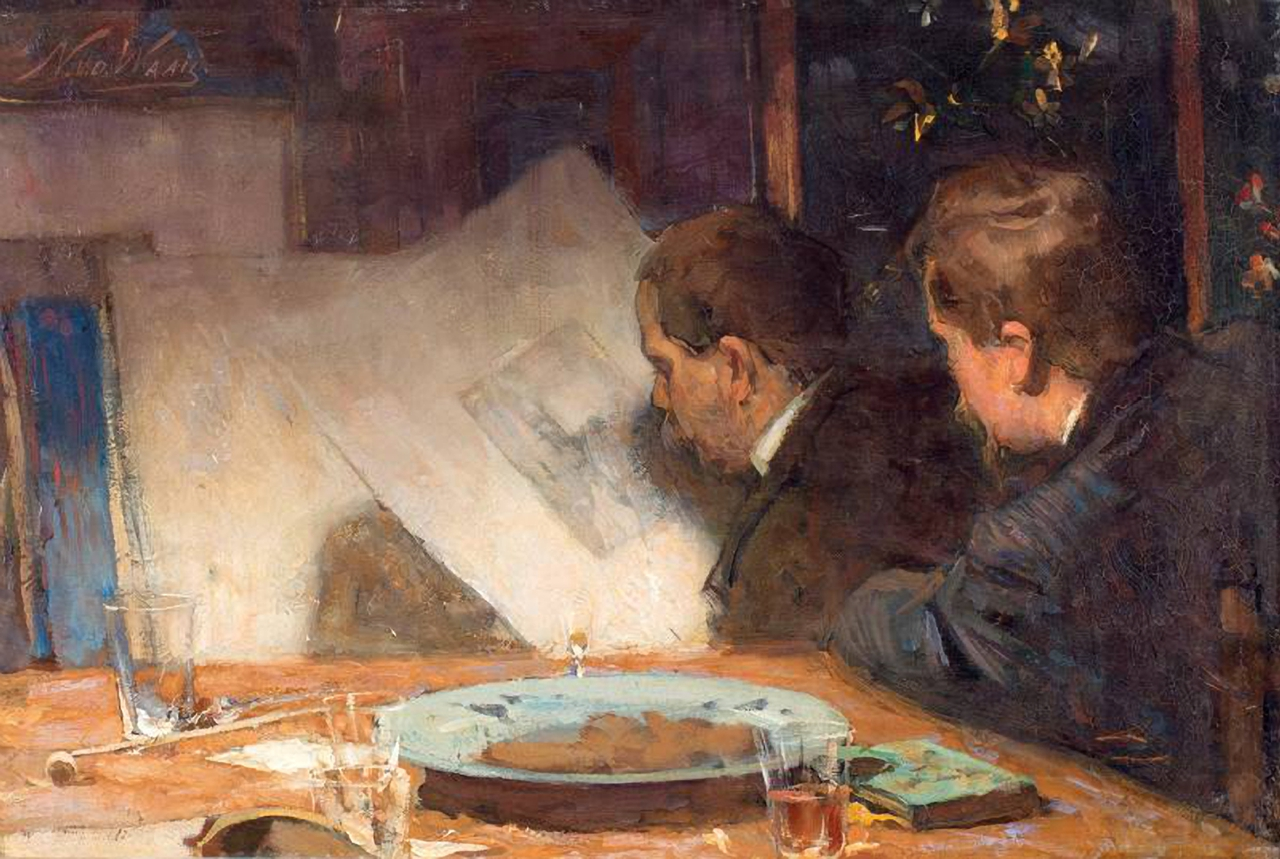
Art Appreciation

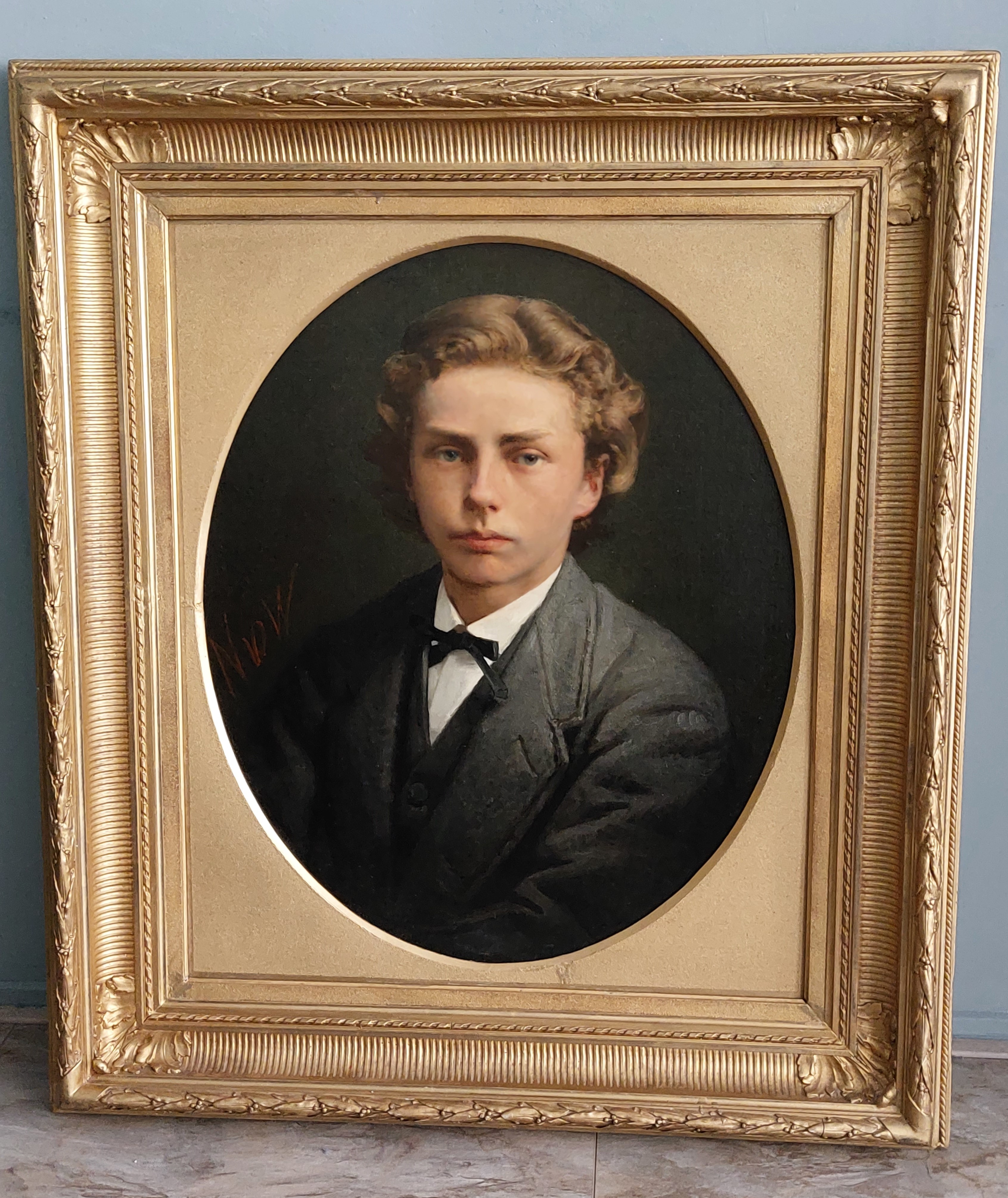
