= Museum Flehite =

Museum in Amersfoort, Netherlands

Coordinates: 52.1568°N 5.3856°E

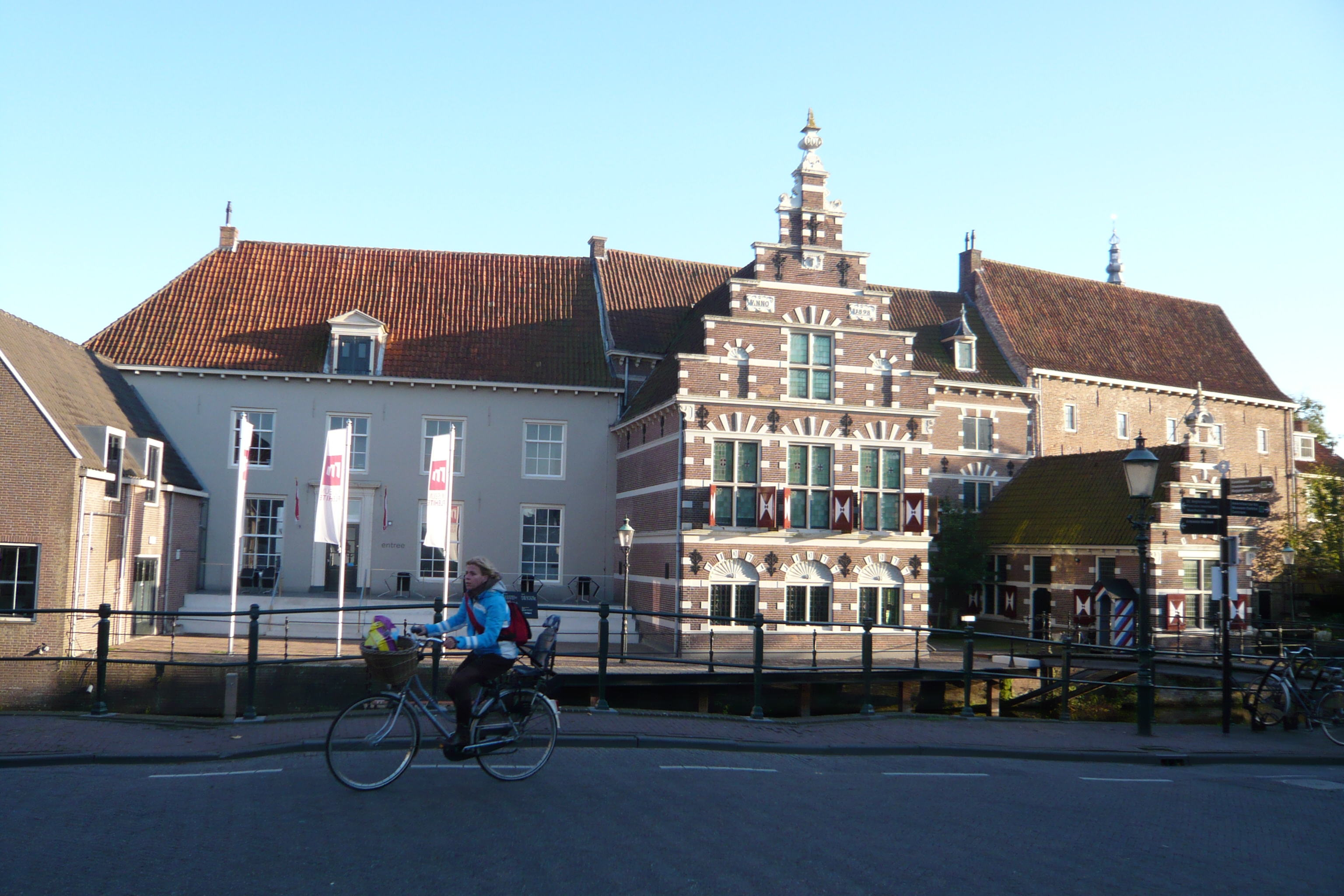
- Flehite museum in Amersfoort
- Established: 1880
- Location: Amersfoort, Netherlands
- Type: History museum
- Website: www.museumflehite.nl

Museum Flehite is the historical museum of Amersfoort and Eemland in the Netherlands. The museum was founded in 1880 by the "Oudheidkundige Vereniging Flehite" (Archeological Association Flehite) (1878). In 1890, the museum moved to the first of the current three-part building on the Breestraat (Breestreet). Since 1976, the museum has been managed by a separate organization.

The museum was closed in 2007 due to asbestos contamination and a large modernization, but the museum reopened in May 2009.
