= Pieneman =

Pieneman is a surname. Notable people with the surname include:

- Jan Willem Pieneman (1779–1853), Dutch painter
- Nicolaas Pieneman (1809–1860), Dutch painter, art collector, lithographer, and sculptor
- Nicolaas Pieneman (1880-1938), Dutch artist
