= Guillaume Eberhard =

Dutch artist

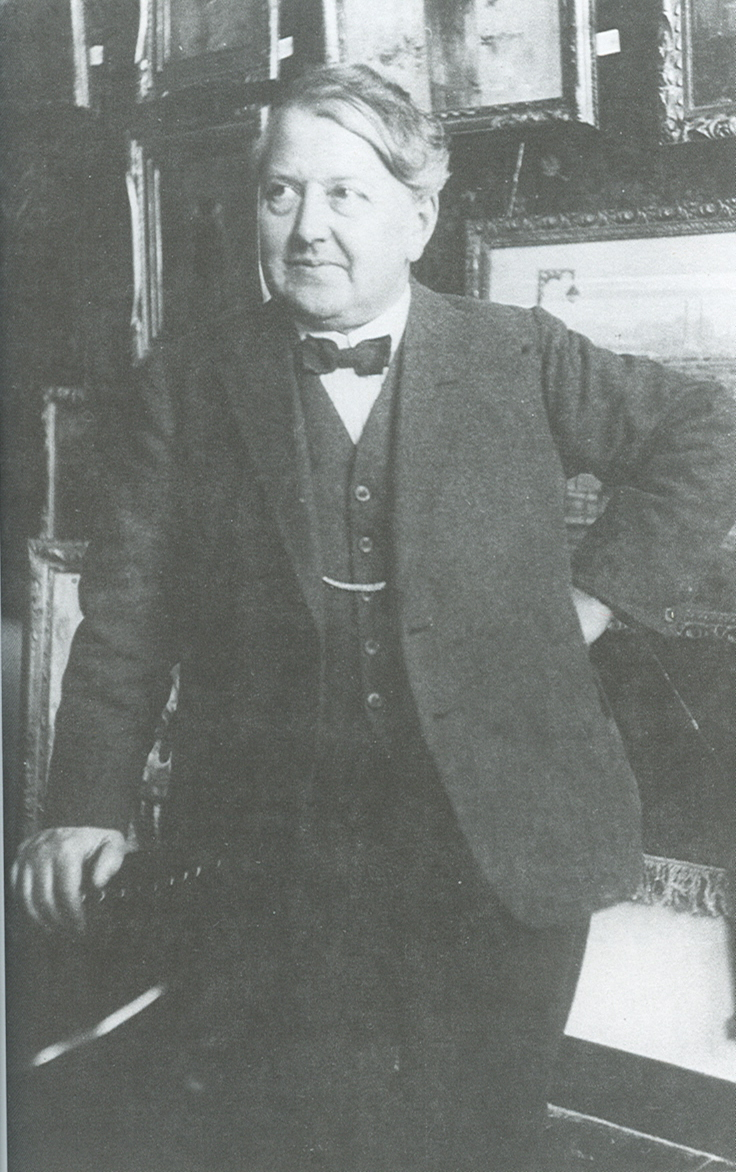
- Born: October 14, 1879; Maastricht, Netherlands
- Died: February 17, 1949 (aged 69); Maastricht, Netherlands
- Education: Rijksakademie van Beeldende Kunsten

Guillaume Eberhard (October 14, 1879 — February 17, 1949) was a Dutch painter.

== Biography ==
Guillaume attended the Drawing Academy in Antwerp. He later studied at the Rijksakademie van Beeldende Kunsten under August Allebé and Carel Dake.

Guillaume founded the Limburgse Kunstkring (Limburg Art Circle) with Jan Bakhoven, Herman Gouwe, Rob Graafland, Henri Jonas, J. Van der Kooy, Jos Narinx, and Vic Reinders.

He was a member of the Amsterdam artist society Arti et Amicitiae.
