= Carel Dake =

Dutch painter and professor

Carel Lodewijk Dake
- Born: August 26, 1857; Amsterdam, Netherlands
- Died: August 8, 1918 (aged 60)
- Occupation: Painter

Carel Dake (August 26, 1857 – August 8, 1918) was a Dutch painter and professor. He taught at Rijksacademie van beeldende kunsten (State Academy of Fine Arts).

Dake taught at Rijksakademie, where his students included Lizzy Ansingh, Tine Baanders, Guillaume Eberhard, Germ de Jong, Lou Loeber, and Johanna Pieneman.

Dake was a member of the artistic society Arti et Amicitiae and served as the president from 1892 to 1896.
