= J.H. Derkinderen-Besier =

Dutch textile artist, fashion historian

Johanna Henriette Derkinderen-Besier
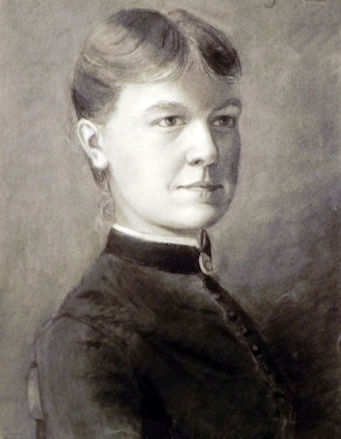
- Self portrait, 1884
- Born: Johanna Henriette Besier; 27 September 1865; Utrecht
- Died: 7 September 1944 (aged 78); Amsterdam
- Occupations: Fashion historian, needle artist
- Spouse: Antoon Derkinderen

Johanna Henriette Derkinderen-Besier (Utrecht, 27 September 1865 – Amsterdam, 7 September 1944) was a Dutch needle artist, fashion historian and publicist who was known professionally under the name J. H. Derkinderen-Besier.

== Life and work ==
Derkinderen-Besier was a member of the patrician family of Besier and a daughter of August Adriaan Henry Besier (1827–1905), a civil servant at the municipal clerk of Utrecht, and Albertina van Ewijck (1836–1898), a member of the Van Ewijck family. She married the artist Prof. Antoon Johannes Derkinderen (1859–1925) in 1894, but the couple did not have children.

Derkinderen-Besier was educated at The Hague Academy of Visual Arts, the Amsterdam Rijksakademie van Beeldende Kunsten and the Rijksschool voor Kunstnijverheid Amsterdam. She became known as a needle artist and as leader of the costume department of the Rijksmuseum in Amsterdam.

She donated many of Derkinderen's sketches and artworks to the Rijksmuseum's collections.

She published several books about fashion in the 16th and 17th centuries, some of which remain "seminal works to greater or lesser extents." In 1927 she published her husband's childhood memories, with an introduction that she wrote. The text featured a portrait of Derkinderen drawn by one of his students, the artist Debora Duyvis.

== Selected bibliography ==
- The clothing of our ancestors: 1700-1900. The costume department in the Netherlands Museum for History and Art in Amsterdam. Amsterdam, 1926.
- [Introduction to:] Antoon der Kinder, The childhood of Antoon der Kinder described by himself in 1892. Bussum, 1927.
- Fashion metamorphoses. The Clothing of Our Ancestors in the Sixteenth Century. Amsterdam, 1933.
- Games of fashion. The Clothing of Our Ancestors in the Seventeenth Century. Amsterdam, 1950.

== External sources ==
- Vrouwen in de vormgeving in Nederland 1880-1940 (Women in design in the Netherlands 1880-1940) (in Dutch)
