= Nicolaas Pieneman (painter, born 1880) =

Dutch painter

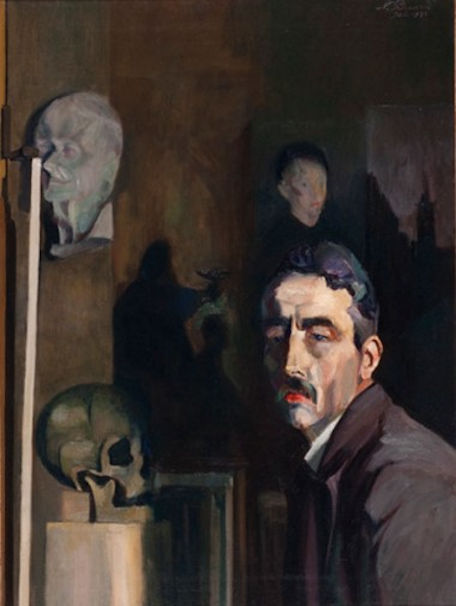
Self-portrait by Nicolaas Pieneman, 1933

Nicolaas Pieneman (1 December 1880 – 1 December 1938) was a Dutch artist.

== Life ==
Pieneman was born in Amsterdam, the son of Nicolaas Pieneman (1853–1945) and his wife Herremijntje (born de Hondt; 1849–1939). Both his father and his grandfather, Dirk Pieneman, were house painters. Both Nicolaas and his younger sister Johanna Pieneman (1889-1986) chose art as a profession.

Pieneman, like his sister Johanna, trained at the Rijksakademie van beeldende kunsten (State Academy of Fine Arts) in Amsterdam as a pupil of Carel Dake and Nicolaas van der Waay. He continued his training at the international painting studio of Amsterdam under the direction of Martin Monnickendam.

He lived and worked in Amsterdam, apart from short periods in London (1912–1913) and Zeist (1913–1914). Pieneman painted and drew city- and townscapes, portraits and landscapes, principally in Amsterdam and surroundings. He joined the artists' groups Sint-Lucas and De Onafhankelijken ("The Independents"). With both groups he exhibited numerous works in the Stedelijk Museum Amsterdam and in 1933 a self-portrait, which, together with a number of other paintings, was given by his son to the nation (Rijksdienst voor het Cultureel Erfgoed).

He submitted work (a painting entitled Régates à la Voile) for the art competition of the 1928 Summer Olympics in Amsterdam, as did his former tutors Monnickendam and van der Waay.

Pieneman died on his 58th birthday, 1 December 1938.

== Selected paintings ==
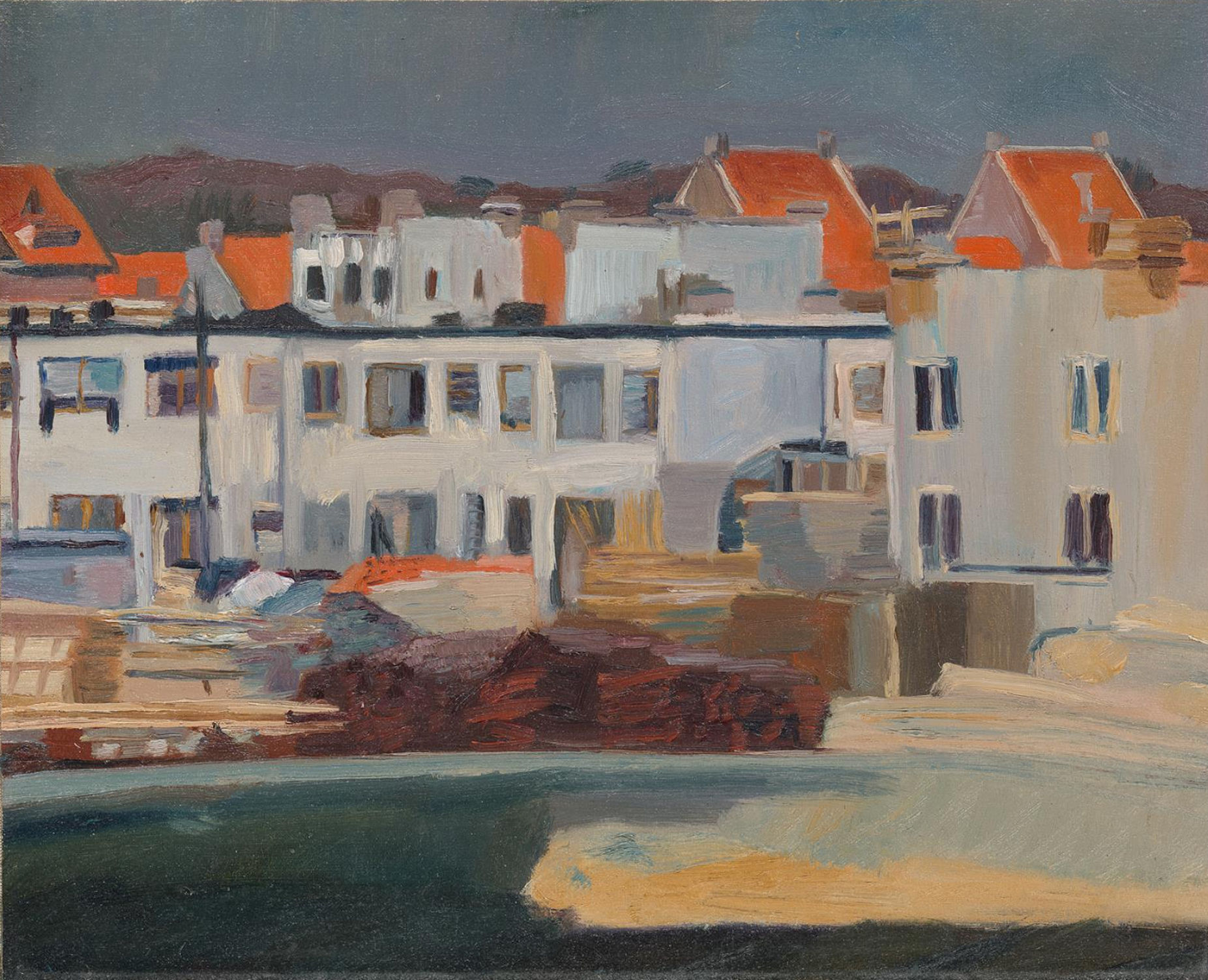
Amsterdam-Betondorp in aanbouw (1925), Amsterdam Museum

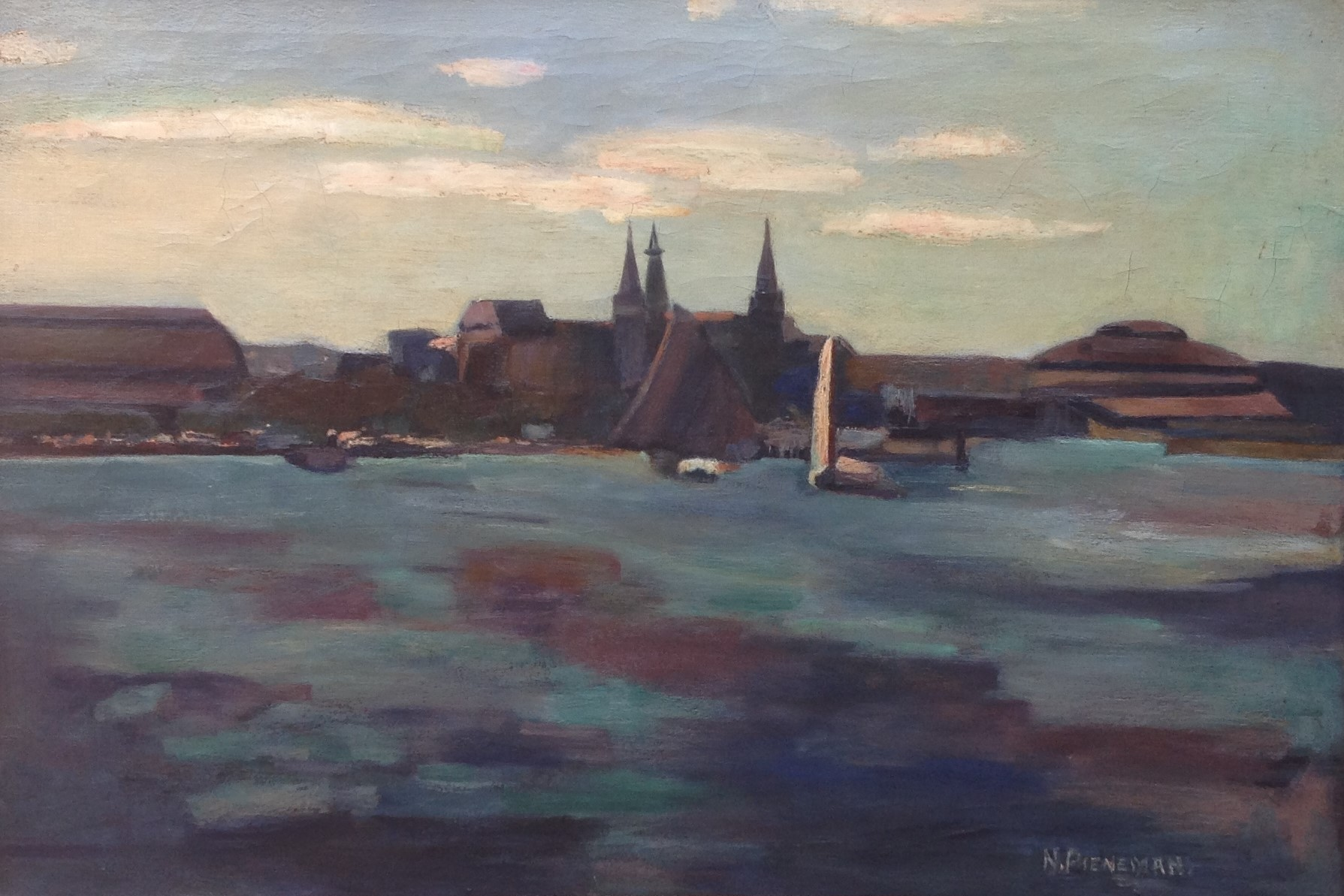
Centraal Station Amsterdam

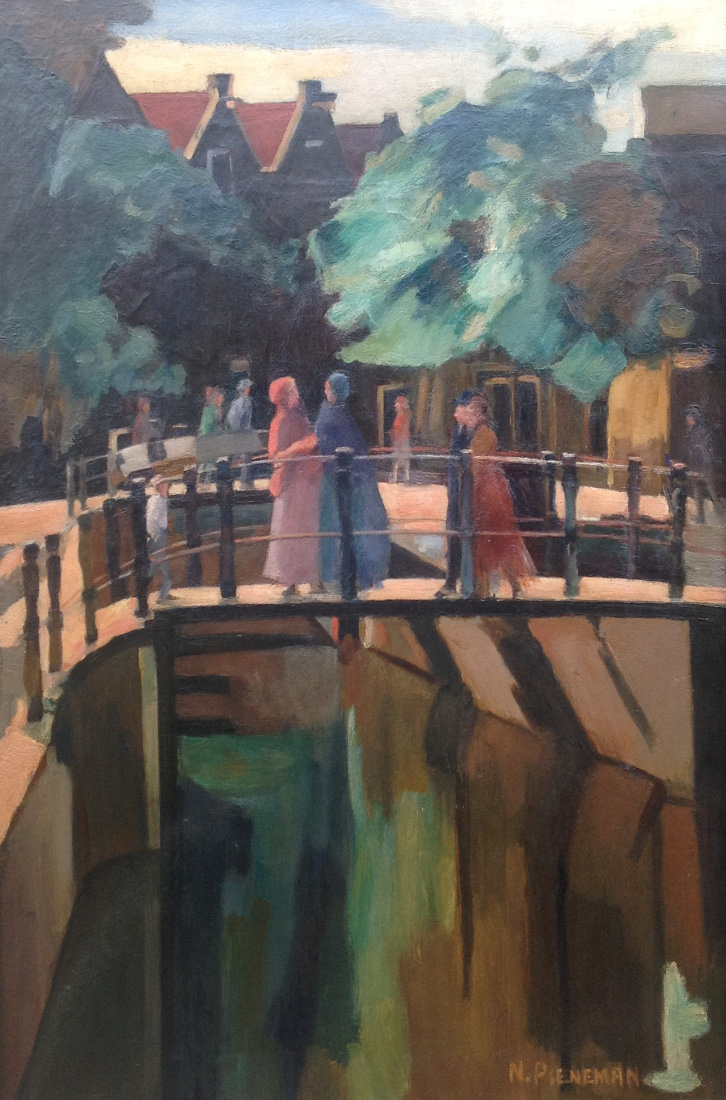
Dames op de brug

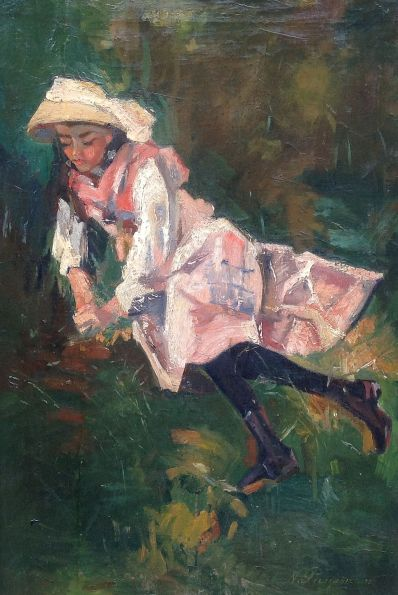
Meisje in gras

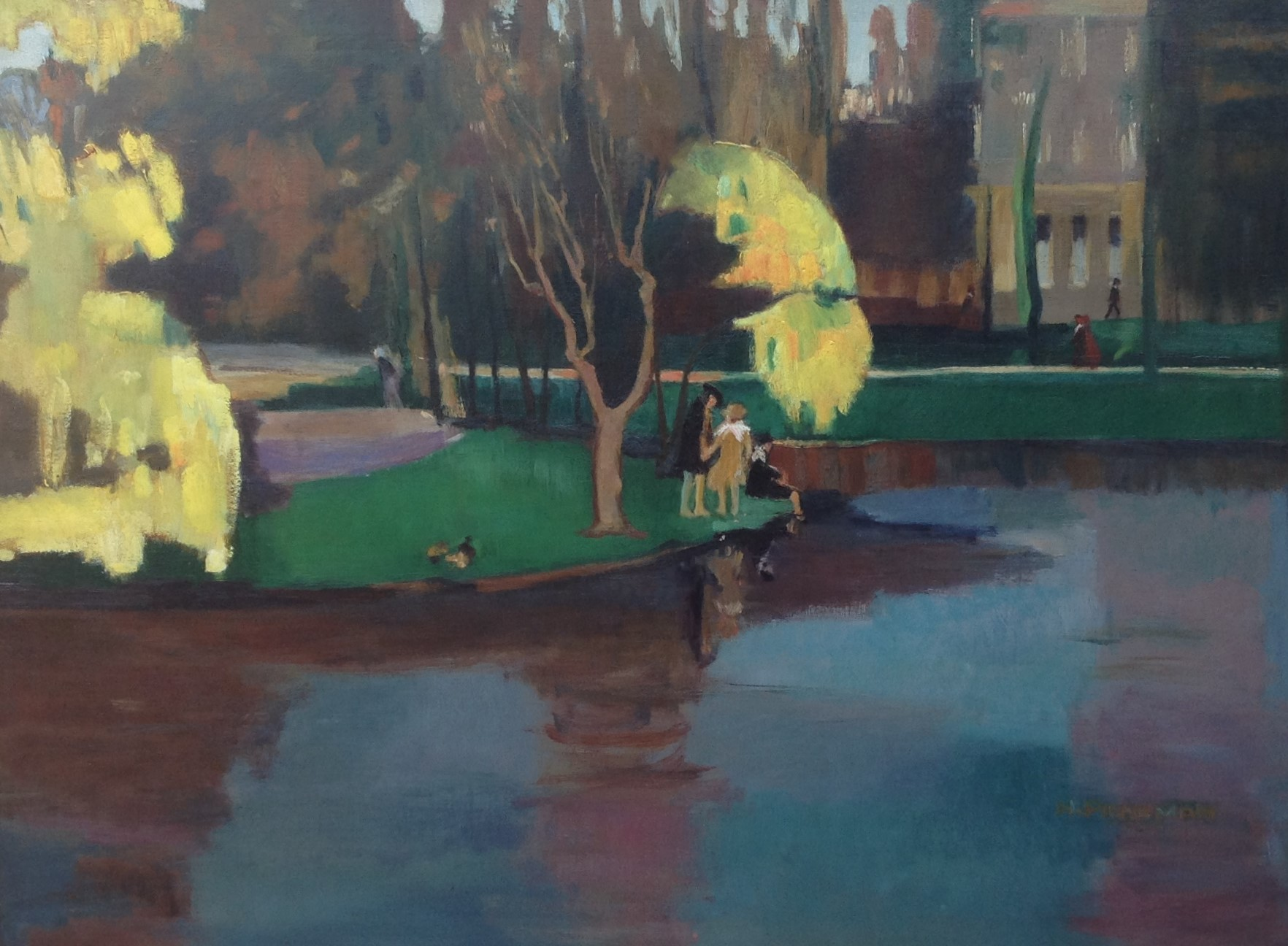
Oosterpark met Tropenmuseum

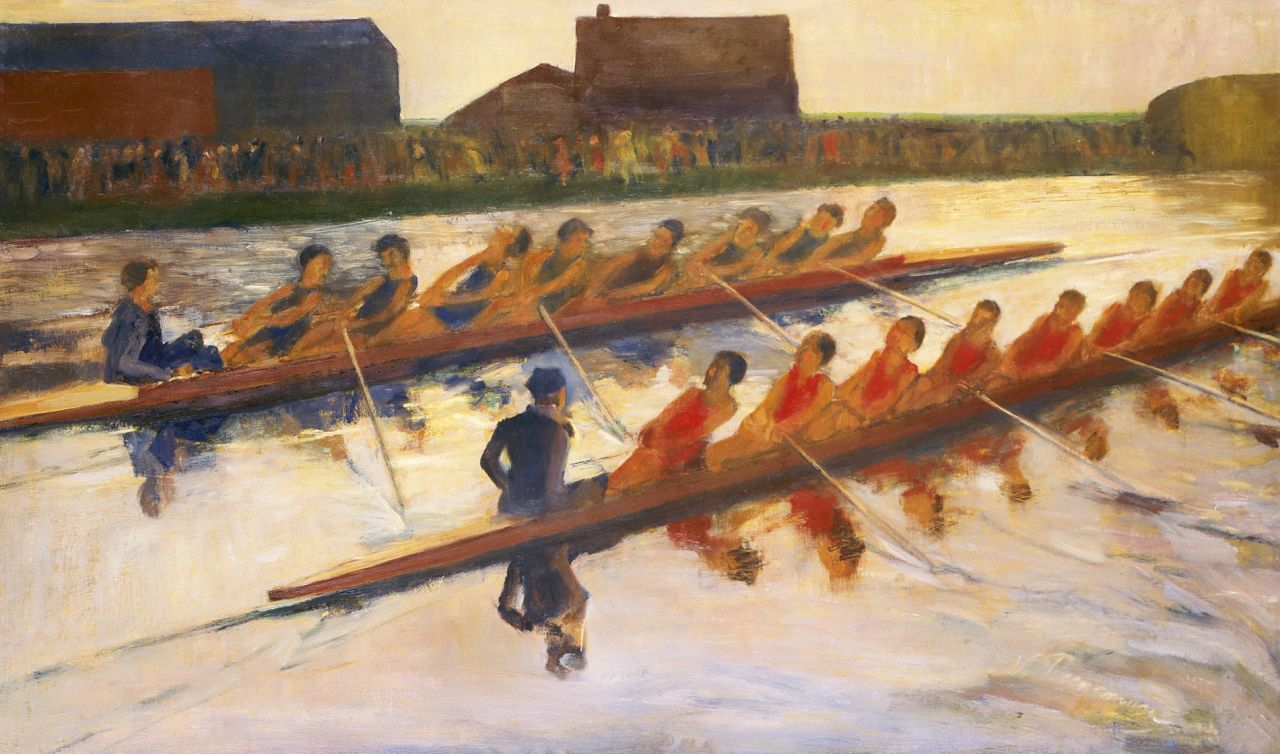
Roeiwedstrijd op de Amstel
