= Debora Duyvis =

Dutch artist (1886–1960)

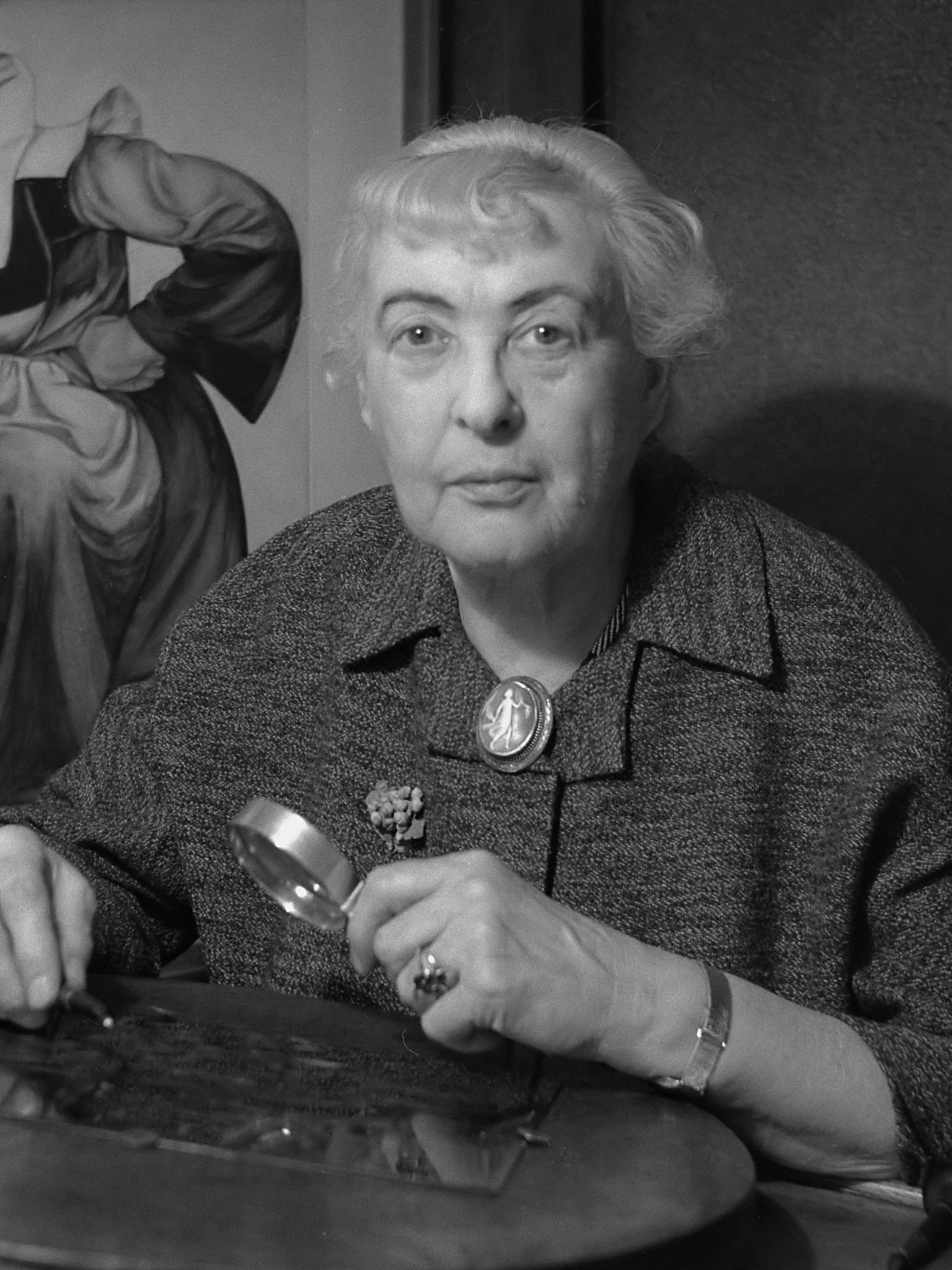
- Born: 17 February 1886; Amsterdam, Netherlands
- Died: 29 October 1974 (aged 88); Amsterdam, Netherlands
- Known for: Illustration, Engraving

Debora Geertruida Duyvis (1886-1960) was a Dutch illustrator and engraver.

== Biography ==
Duyvis was born on 17 February 1886 in Amsterdam. She studied at the Rijksakademie van beeldende kunsten (State Academy of Fine Arts). Her instructors included Johannes Josephus Aarts and Antoon Derkinderen. She provided a drawing of Derkinderen for a biography of his childhood memories, published by his wife, the Dutch artist J.H. Derkinderen-Besier titled The childhood of Antoon der Kinder described by himself in 1892, published in 1927.

She was a member of the Vereniging tot Bevordering der Grafische Kunst (VBGK) (Association for the Promotion of Graphic Art). In 1933 Duyvis' reputation as an artist was bolstered by a positive review of her burin engravings by noted critic Bram Hammacher. Her work was included in the 1939 exhibition and sale Onze Kunst van Heden (Our Art of Today) at the Rijksmuseum in Amsterdam. During the World War II occupation of the Netherlands Duyvis declined to register with the German Nederlandsche Kultuurkamer but was able to continue earning a living as an artist.

Duyvis died on 29 October 1974 in Amsterdam.

== Personal life ==
Duyvis never married but was in a relationship with fellow artist Richard Roland Holst (1868-1938) from about 1926 until his death.
