= Johanna Pieneman =

Dutch artist

- Born: 17 February 1889; Amsterdam, Netherlands
- Died: 28 April 1986 (aged 97); Amsterdam, Netherlands
- Other names: Johanna Hendrika Pieneman
- Known for: Painting

Johanna Hendrika Pieneman (1889-1986) was a Dutch artist.

== Biography ==
Pieneman was born on 17 February 1889 in Amsterdam. Her brother, Nicolaas Pieneman (1880-1938), was also a painter. She studied at the Dagtekenschool voor meisjes (English:Day drawing school for girls) and the Rijksakademie van beeldende kunsten (State Academy of Fine Arts) in Amsterdam. Her teachers included Carel Lodewijk Dake, Antoon Derkinderen, Wilhelmina Cornelia Kerlen, and Nicolaas van der Waay. Her work was included in the 1939 exhibition and sale Onze Kunst van Heden (Our Art of Today) at the Rijksmuseum in Amsterdam.

Pieneman was a member of the Kunstenaarsvereniging Sint Lucas and she exhibited with them from 1914 through 1949. She was also a member of De Onafhankelijken (The Independents).

Pieneman died on 28 April 1986 in Amsterdam.
