= Rob Graafland =

Dutch painter

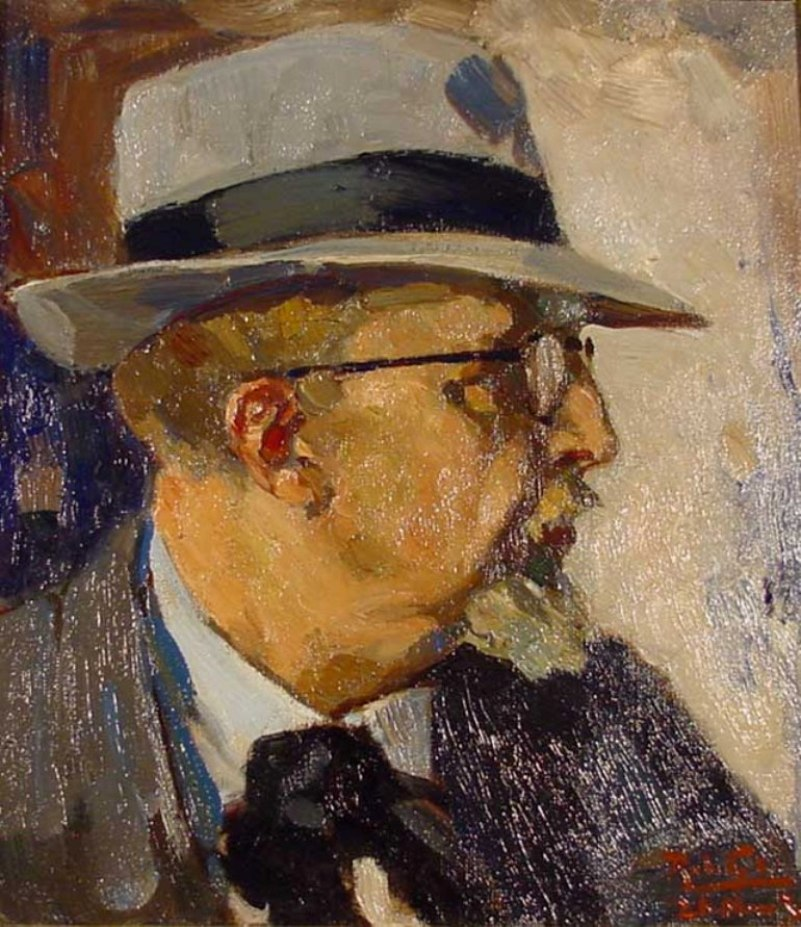
- Born: 26 November 1875; Maastricht, Netherlands
- Died: 28 April 1940 (aged 64); Heerlen, Netherlands
- Occupation: Painter

Rob Graafland (26 November 1875 – 28 April 1940) was a Dutch painter. His work was part of the painting event in the art competition at the 1936 Summer Olympics.

== Gallery ==
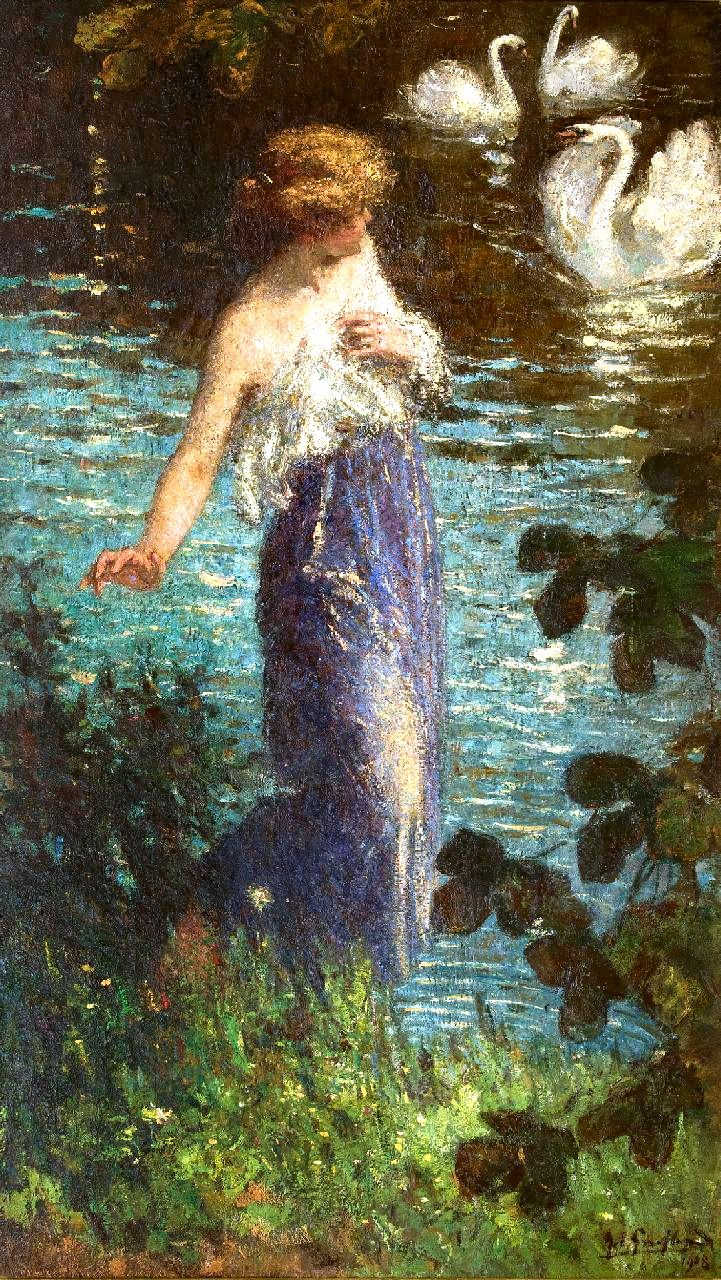
Le cygne méchant (1908)

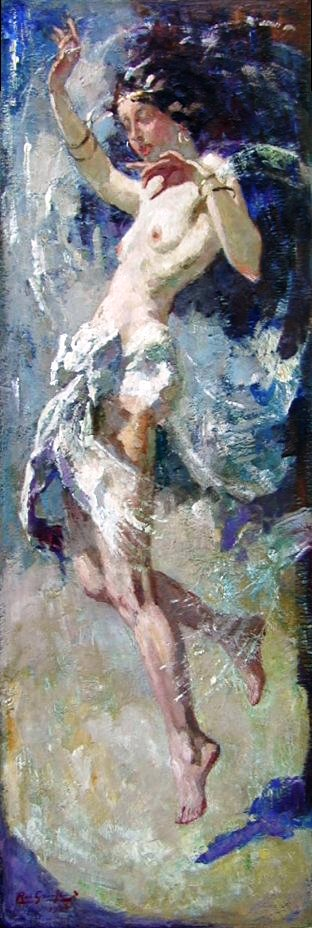
Danseres (1937)
