= Antoon Derkinderen =

Dutch painter and autobiographer (1859–1925)

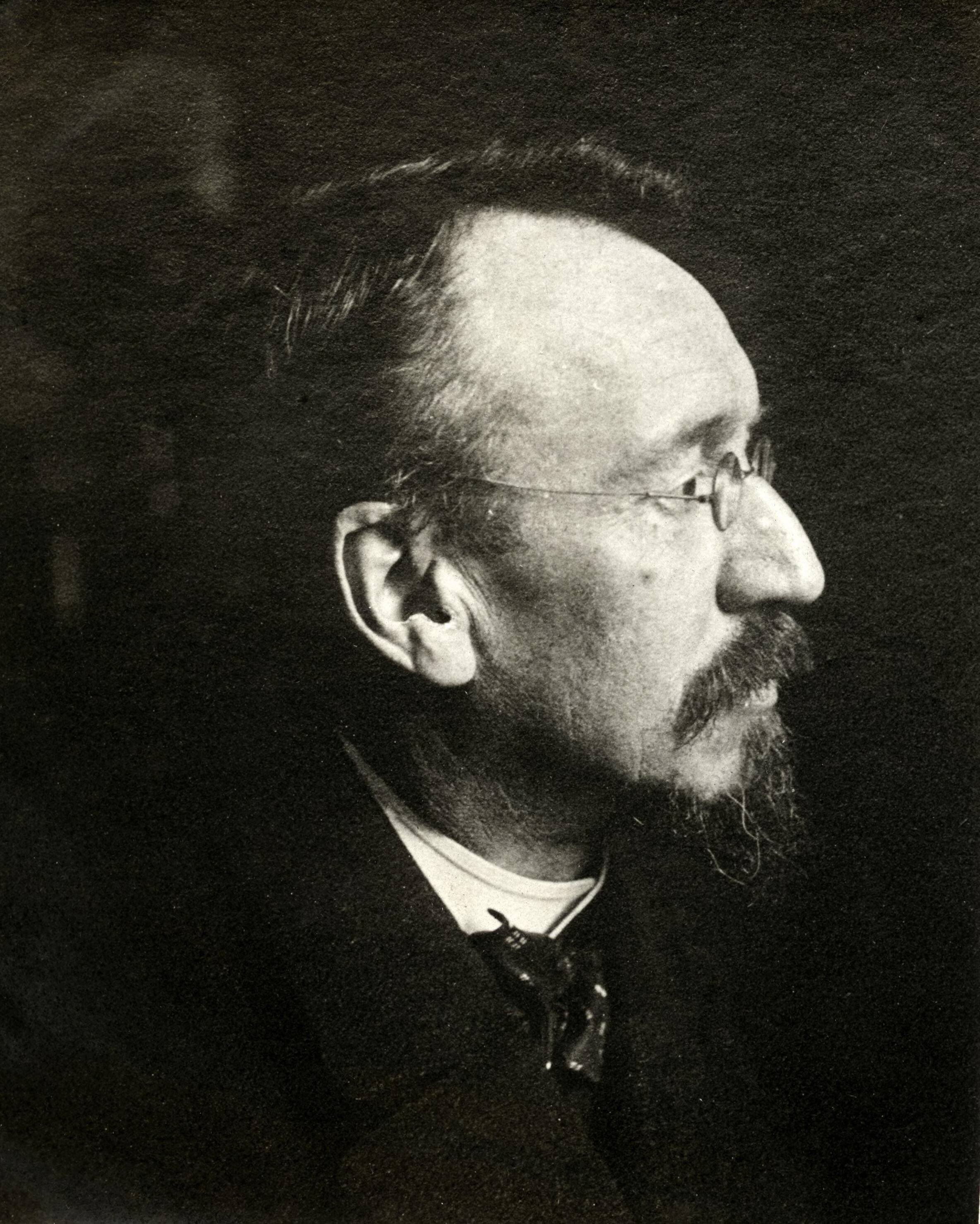
- Derkinderen (c. 1914)
- Born: Antonius Johannes Derkinderen 's-Hertogenbosch, 20 December 1859
- Died: 2 November 1925; Amsterdam
- Known for: Painting, Drawing, Glass art

Signature
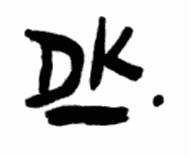

Antonius Johannes (Antoon) Derkinderen ('s-Hertogenbosch, 20 December 1858 – Amsterdam, 2 November 1925) was a Dutch painter, Glass artist, Draftsman and designer of book covers.

== Life ==
=== Early years ===
Antoon Derkinderen was born in 's-Hertogenbosch in 1859 to Antonius Henricus Derkinderen, gold- and silversmith, and Hendrica de Rooij. At the time the town was deeply Catholic and conservative.

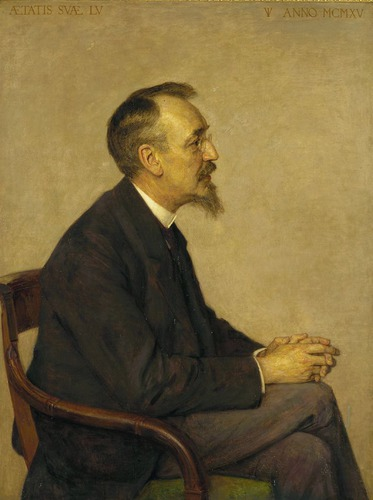
Portrait by Jan Veth

From 1874 to 1878 Derkinderen went to the daytime school for primary school teachers Rijkskweekschool voor Onderwijzers in 's-Hertogenbosch. The simple reason why Derkinderen went to this school, was that the education was solid and free of charge. He also became qualified to teach drawing and mathematics. Derkinderen would lead the choir of this school with very much enthusiasm. In May 1878 Derkinderen qualified as an assistant teacher for primary education.

In his hometown 's-Hertogenbosch, Derkinderen then went to the Royal School of Applied and Visual Arts from 1878 to 1880. This school was led by J.Th. Stracké. Derkinderen would receive extensive teaching by Stracké, and would later note how much he appreciated his teacher. Three days a week Derkinderen got lessons in architectural drawing by Lambert Hezenmans, architect of the restoration of the famous local St. John's Cathedral. Derkinderen appreciated Hezenmans' work a lot less, but the constant exposure to the work at the cathedral and its art can hardly have failed to influence Derkinderen.

In 1880 Derkinderen went to Amsterdam, where he studied at the Rijksakademie van beeldende kunsten till 1883. In 1882 Derkinderen interrupted his study to go to Brussels together with Jan Toorop. He remained there for a year to study at the drawing academy led by Jan Frans Portaels. In 1886 and 1887 he lived on the Parkweg in Amsterdam.

Derkinderen was one of the first members of the Artist Society St. Luke. From 1888 till 1890 he was again in Brussels.

Derkinderen then settled in the art colony Laren. Derkinderen had many relations. His ideal was that students would learn to paint in a craftsman model based on the medieval guilds. This would unit arts and crafts. In 1903 he founded the workshop 'De Zonnebloem' in Laren. In this workshop some large leadlights were produced, amongst them the leadlight for the stock exchange. However, a lack of further orders forced Derkinderen to sell the workshop again in 1906.

=== Principal of the national academy of visual arts ===
In 1907 Derkinderen moved to Amsterdam again, where he became principal of the Rijksakademie van beeldende kunsten. He remained principal till 1925. In 1914 Derkinderen became a doctor honoris causa at the Rijksuniversiteit Groningen.

=== Family life ===
In 1894 Derkinderen married the artist and historian Johanna Henriette Besier (1865-1944) but the marriage remained childless. In 1927 his wife would publish his childhood memories titled: 'The youth of Antoon Derkinderen told by himself in 1892' De jeugd van Antoon der Kinderen door hemzelf beschreven anno 1892. The work contains a portrait by his student Debora Duyvis (1886-1974).

== Works ==
=== First assignment, the Sacrament of Miracle ===
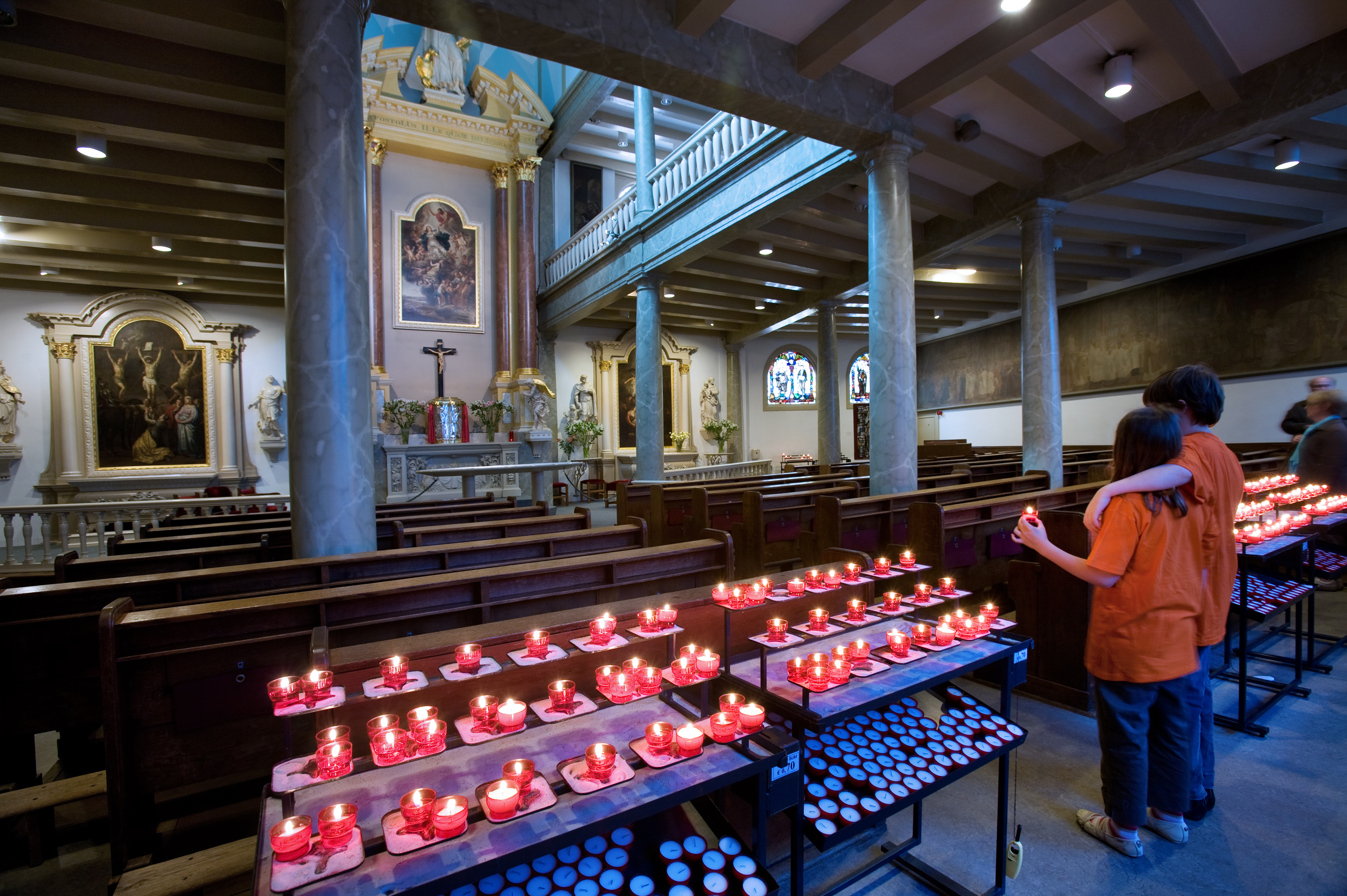
Sacrament of Miracle on the right wall

Derkinderen's got his first assignment in 1884. It was for a painting of the medieval Amsterdam procession on account of the Miracle of Amsterdam. It would have to be placed in the Begijnhof Chapel, Amsterdam. The assignment was given by B.H. Klönne. Derkinderen first set out to produce the painting that Klönne intended. He portraited about 80 Catholic citizens that would recognizable appear in the painting. In 1887 Derkinderen then went to study in Italy, but it was on the way back in France that his ideas changed. In the Paris Panthéon he saw the work of Pierre Puvis de Chavannes. Derkinderen then changed the painting from following a traditional Catholic idea, to a painting that incorporated modern ideas. The first change was that he began to use shadowy halftints, the second that it became much more abstract, the prominent citizens were no longer recognizable.

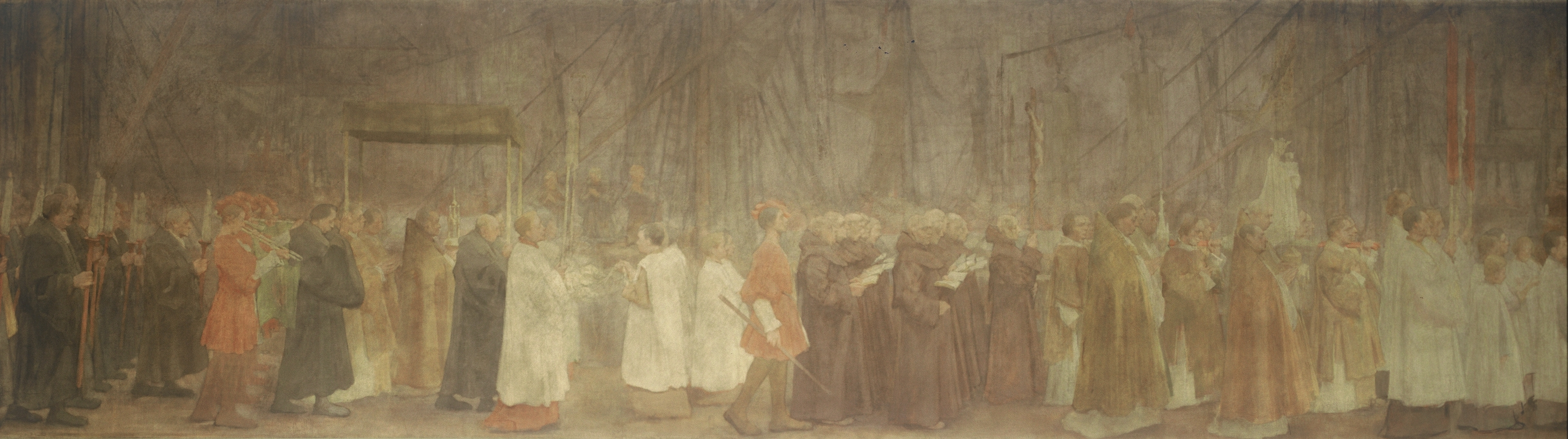
Sacrament of Miracle (1884)

When it was finished, the painting was exhibited in Art hall Panorama in Amsterdam. In June 1889 it was exhibited in Pulchri on the Prinsegracht in the Hague. The painting was widely discussed in the Dutch media, and Derkinderen became famous. There was a lot of criticism, but most experts were positive. The painting got an enthusiastic review by Jan Veth. He appreciated Derkinderen's intention to create a painting that was part of the building, instead of an independent work of art.

Principal Klönne was less than enthusiastic. He refused the work for which he had already paid the full price of 4,000 guilders, and ordered a replacement by C.F. Philippeau. The Sacrament of Miracle was bought by a private person, and in 1895 it was received in loan by the Stedelijk Museum Amsterdam. In one of these transactions Klönne, received 2,000 for the painting, in return for which he gave up his claims against Derkinderen. In 1929 Derkinderen was fully vindicated when his work replaced Philippeau's work, which was moved to a higher floor.

=== Establishes himself with murals ===
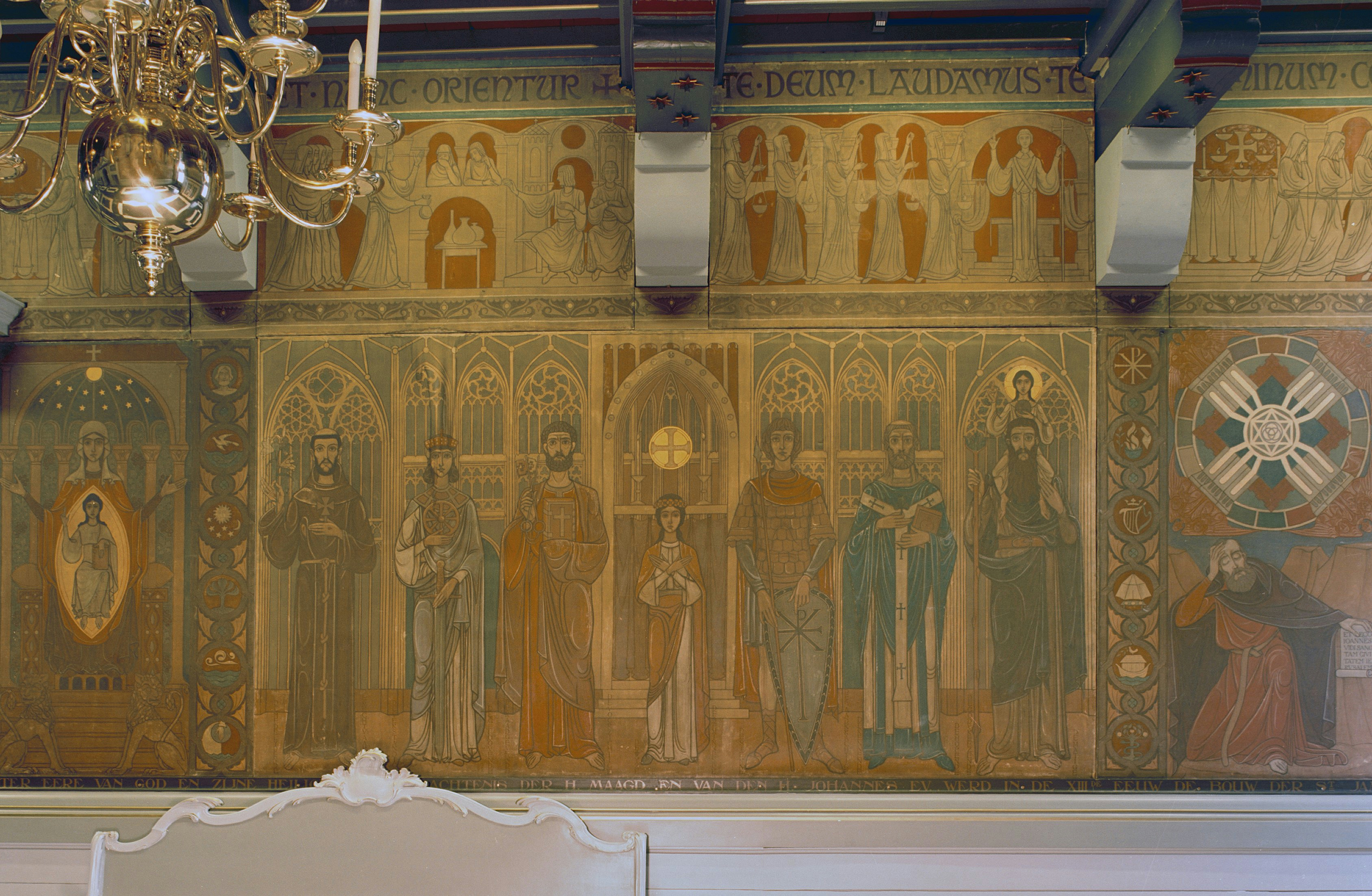
Mural in city hall 's-Hertogenbosch

Already by 1884 Derkinderen had exhibited sketches for murals in 's-Hertogenbosch city hall. These had met with wide approval. For the 700th anniversary of 's-Hertogenbosch Derkinderen designed a procession, which probably re-used his research. In August 1889 the municipality accepted Derkinderen's design.

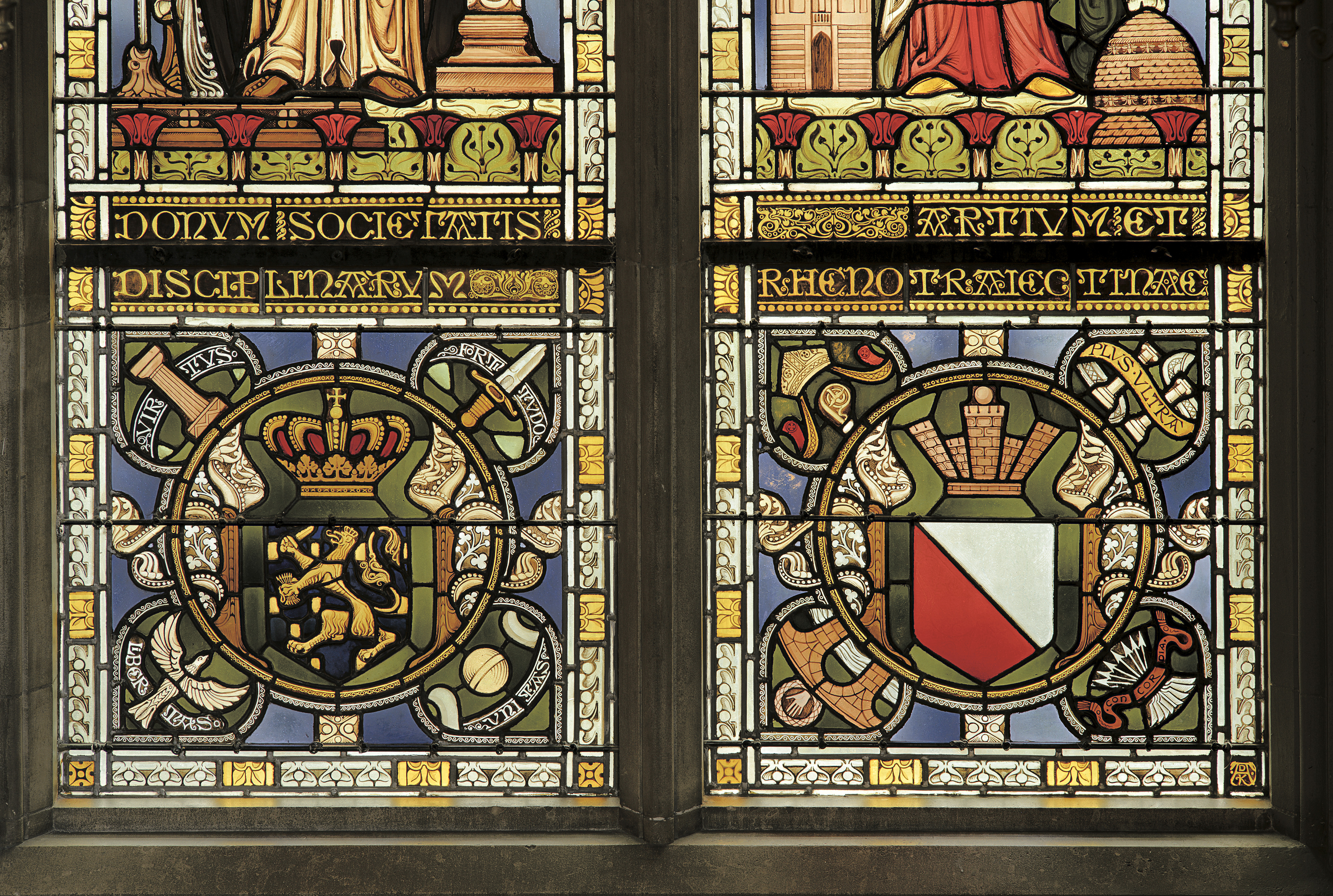
Leadlight Utrecht University

In 1891 Derkinderen realized his design, which became known as the first Bosch wall. It was a work on canvas which was affixed to the wall, and made Derkinderen an established artist. One year later Art critic Jan Veth wrote Derkinderens wandschildering in het Bossche stadhuis, and launched the term: community art gemeenschapskunst, (cf. Community arts). It founded Derkinderen's reputation as a monumental painter and community artist. In 1893 Derkinderen painted the Second Bosch wall. This was received with far less enthusiasm, primarily because it was much more stylized.

Derkinderen was very interested in Leadlight art. He was convinced that it was a form of community art even more than monumental painting was. Derkinderens's first big leadlight assignment was the window for Utrecht University in 1893/1894. At first the architects E. Engel and C. Muysken wanted to refuse the work, because it did not fit with the renaissance character of the building. It was nevertheless accepted.

=== Book Illustrations ===
In the 1890s Leo Simons took the initiative to produce a very luxurious edition of Joost van den Vondel's Gijsbrecht van Aemstel. Derkinderen illustrated the book, stage designs were made by H.P. Berlage. Music was composed by Alphons Diepenbrock and Bernard Zweers. The multidisciplinary cooperation between artists makes the book a prime example of late nineteenth century community art.

In 1895 the first issue of the 'Gedenkboek der Keuze-tentoonstelling van 1892' appeared. Derkinderen made the cover, the frontispiece and other decorations. Next Derkinderen illustrated the Missa by Alphons Diepenbrock. Diepenbrock was one of the closest friends of Derkinderen. In 1898 Diepenbrock's Sequentia Stabat Mater Dolorosa was illustrated by Derkinderen.

=== Berlage's General Society for Life Insurance and Annuities ===
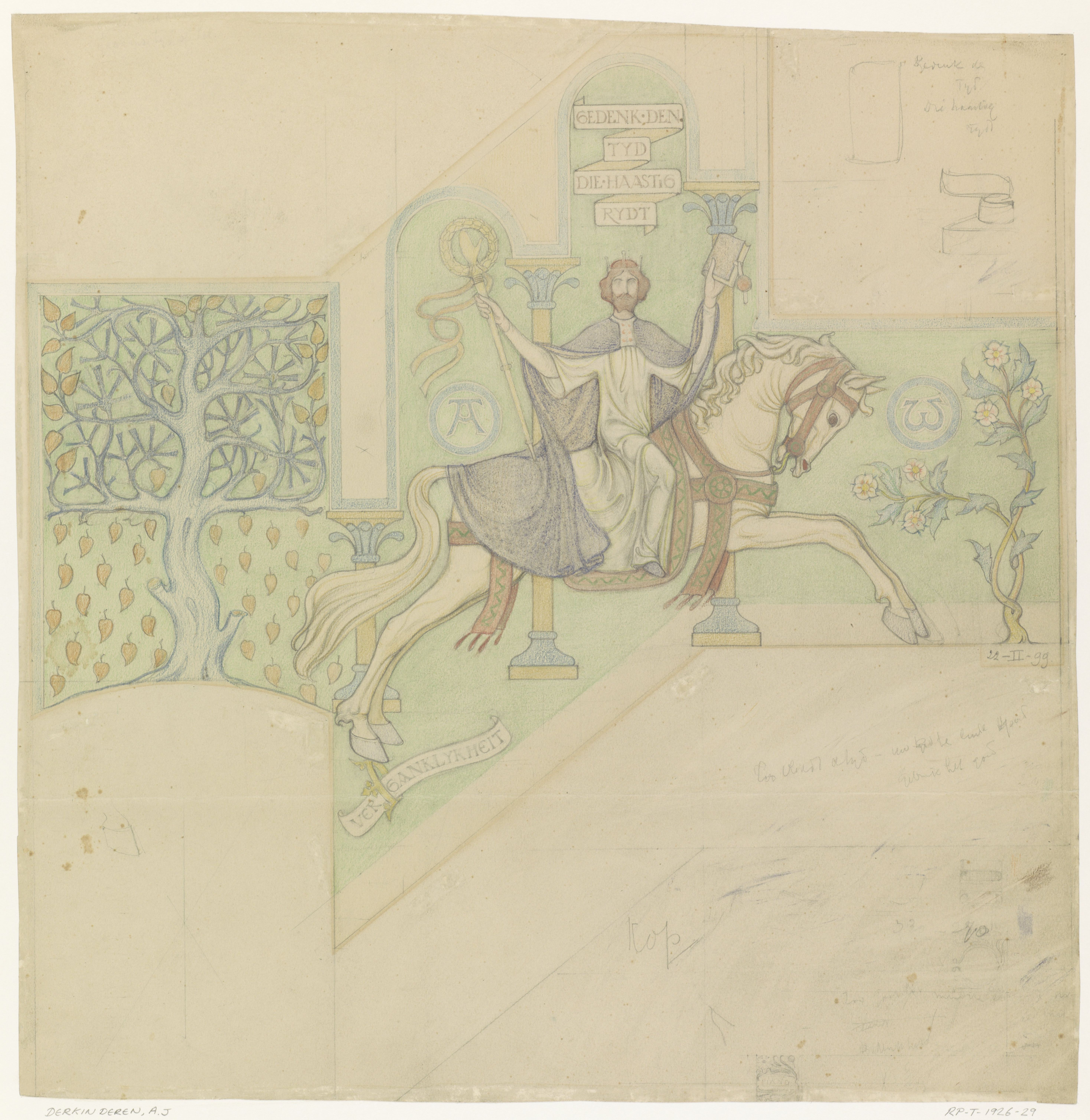
Time (1899)

After producing the Vondel edition, Derkinderen would cooperate with the architect Berlage for a while. Derkinderen got an assignment for murals in the building that Berlage designed for the General Society for Life Insurance and Annuities Algemeene Maatschappij van Levensverzekering en Lijfrente, which was built 1895-1900. Derkinderen completed the murals in the stairway of the building in 1900. This time, the presence of central heating induced Derkinderen to paint directly on the wall. The work had a commercial meaning, advertising the usefulness of insurance. This probably caused that it did not make a deep impression.

The first floor of the stairway had 'Luxury' and 'Need' across from 'Life Insurance'. Between the first and second floors was 'Time'. On the second floor were 'Health' and 'Illness' across from 'The Wheel of Fortune'. Between the second and third floor was the 'Stair of life'.

Seven design drawings for the work were exhibited during construction, and 'The Wheel of Fortune' and 'Time' were sold while on exhibition in Utrecht. In 1902 Need (De Nood) was acquired by Museum Boijmans Van Beuningen. In late 1904 the Utrecht Museum for Applied Arts (Utrechtsch Museum van Kunstnijverheid) bought 'The Lesson' (De Wijze Les). The building was later used by C&A, and burned down in 1963.

=== Work on Berlage's Exchange ===
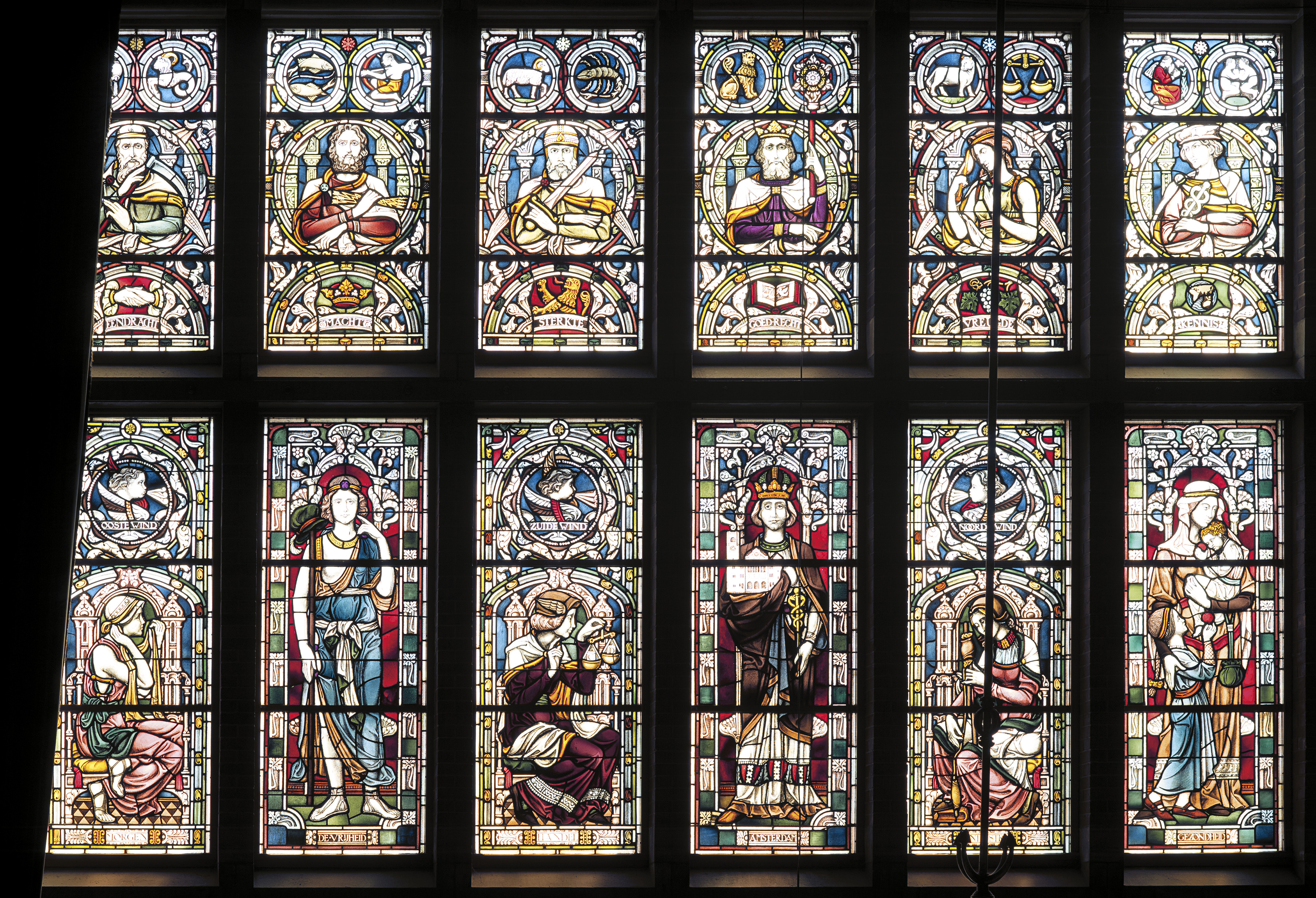
Amsterdam Stock Exchange

Derkinderen's next big assignment was for the Amsterdam Exchange, now known as the Beurs van Berlage. The assignment to decorate the Great Hall of the chamber of commerce, which was really a city auditorium, was given in mid 1900. By November 1900 the roof of the building was closed and work on the interior started. By November 1901 it became known that Berlage refused to accept Derkinderen's work. According to him, Derkinderen had deviated from the overall plan, especially by incorporating symbolism in his wall paintings.

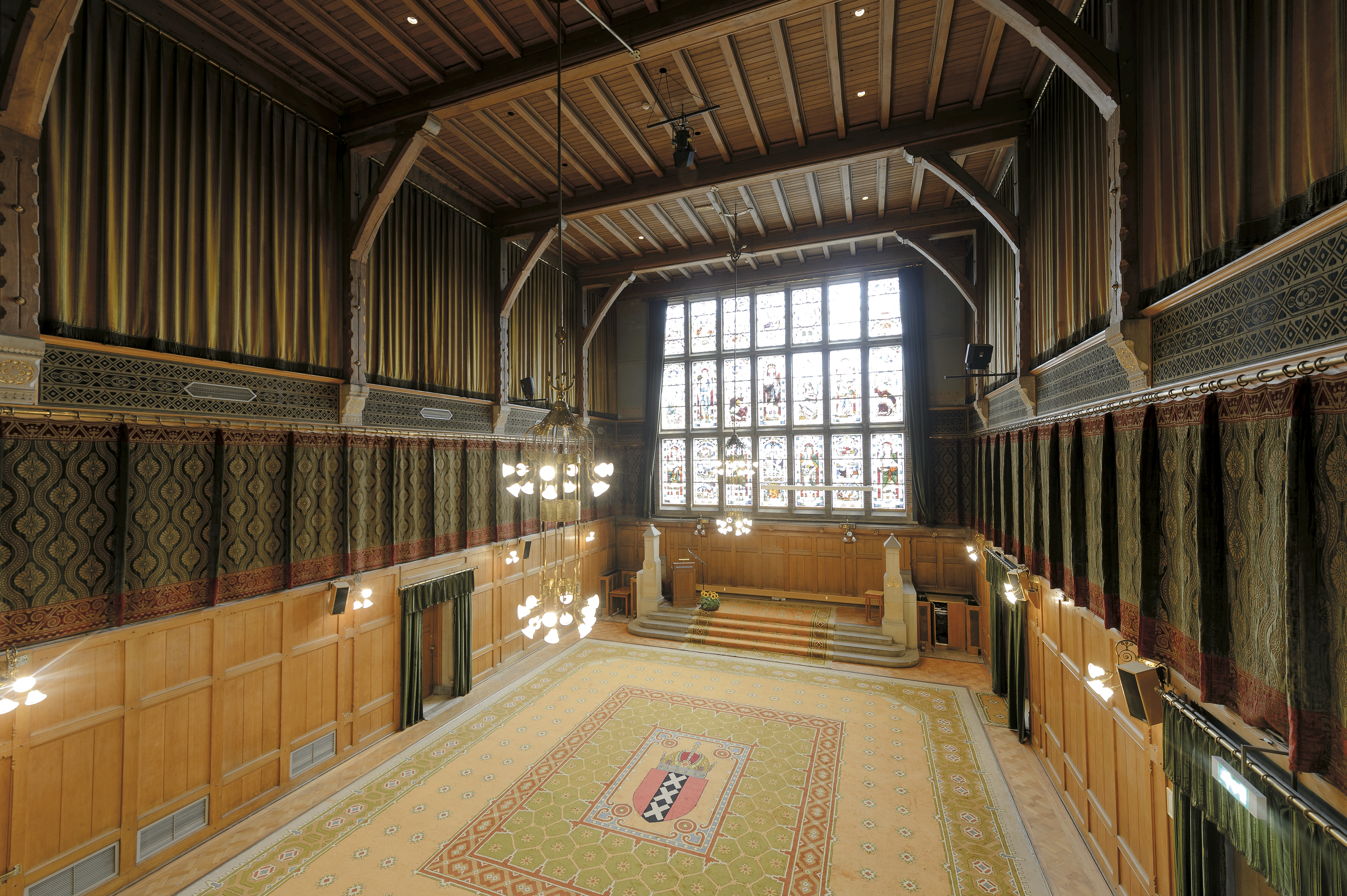
Hall with panelling and curtains

The issue was solved by appointing a committee of arbitration, which would decide whether Derkinderen could refer to artistic license, or was bound to work according to the project description. Members of the committee were Jan Veth, and A. Pit, who would appoint a third member. In January 1902 the conflict was ended by this committee, with both parties moving a bit. When the exchange opened in May 1903, the great leadlight of the hall was complete.

Derkinderen's murals were delayed by serious concerns about the acoustics of the hall. By late 1904 these paintings were not yet completed. In December 1905 Derkinderen's designs for the wall paintings were published. A commission was then appointed to investigate whether it would possible to change the acoustics of the hall so it would become suitable for public events other than formal meetings. The commission concluded that this could perhaps be done by applying fabric to the wall, i.e. by executing Derkinderen's design on canvas affixed to the wall. Even then, the result would not be certain. One could only be sure in advance by fixing canvas to the walls at a cost of 3,000 guilders, which would be lost if the result was insufficient. The city government declined this experiment, and advised another option to the council. The council insisted on the wall paintings.

Meanwhile the foundations of the exchange proved less than solid, and cracks in the walls appeared in multiple places. By August 1907 the municipality planned to place 3.5 m high panelling in the hall. Above that came brocade curtains, and above these velour curtains. The paneling prevented the execution of Derkinderens's design, and in a practical sense this also applied to the curtains. By 1909 the hall had a lowered ceiling, and litigation between the municipality and Derkinderen seemed imminent. Derkinderen and the municipality worked out a solution, but it was Derkinderen's last big assignment for a mural.

=== The Bazel ===
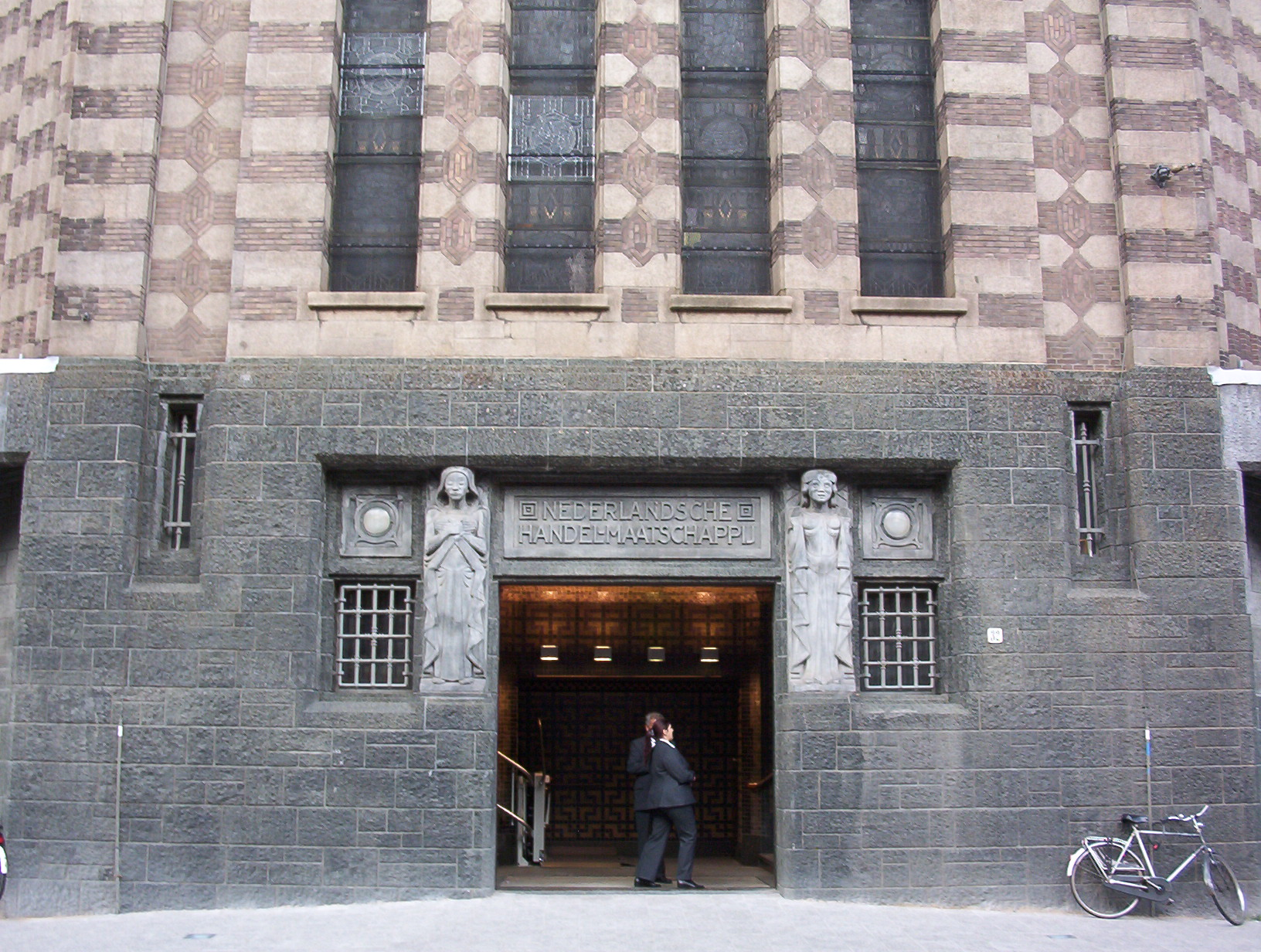
De Bazel

Derkinderen's last big leadlight assignment was for De Bazel. This was built as the office of the Netherlands Trading Society (NHM) from 1919 to 1926. The NHM was a very powerful company and bank, and this was expressed in its offices, which became over 100 m long, and had 10 floors. Construction took place between 1919 and 1926. Before the building was finished, the architect Karel de Bazel died on 28 November 1923. Derkinderen then advised on the completion of the building.

Above the entrance on the Vijzelstraat is a stairway with a series of 20 memorial leadlights offered by the Asian staff of the company. These were designed by Derkinderen and finished by Joep Nicolas. They leadlights depict: the situation before the foundation of the NHM with unemployment, poverty, degeneration and welfare; The sources of wealth personified by Gaia, Neptune, Juno and Vulcan; Next is the use of wealth, depicted in need, action, luxury, and fight; The last eight windows further elaborate on this by depicting the legend of the Lady of Stavoren. Derkinderen also designed other leadlights in the great hall, also finished by Nicolas.

== Significance ==
Derkinderen was inspired by, e.g., the "Gesamtkunst" of Richard Wagner and the medieval cathedrals, and strove for a fusion of art disciplines under the leadership of architecture. Under the influence of the ideas of William Morris and Walter Crane, he came to the realization that by following "l'art pour l'art" ideas art had become isolated from society, and artisanship had been ignored. Derkinderen strove for a new integration of art and society, in which art serviced society and emanated from society. As such, community art was not about individual impressions and emotions, but about expressing grand and broad ideas.

== Gallery ==
=== Multiple techniques ===
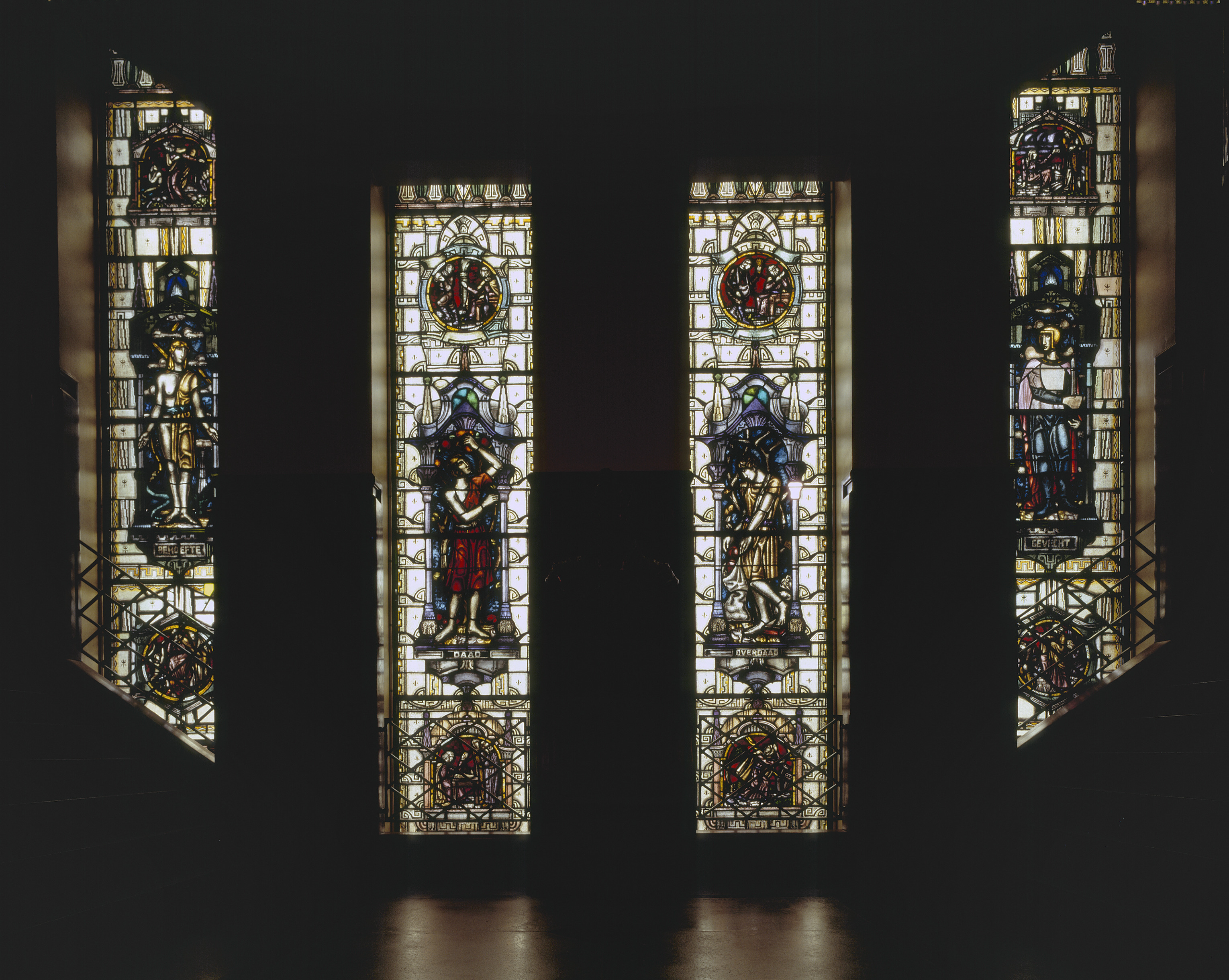
De Bazel (Amsterdam)

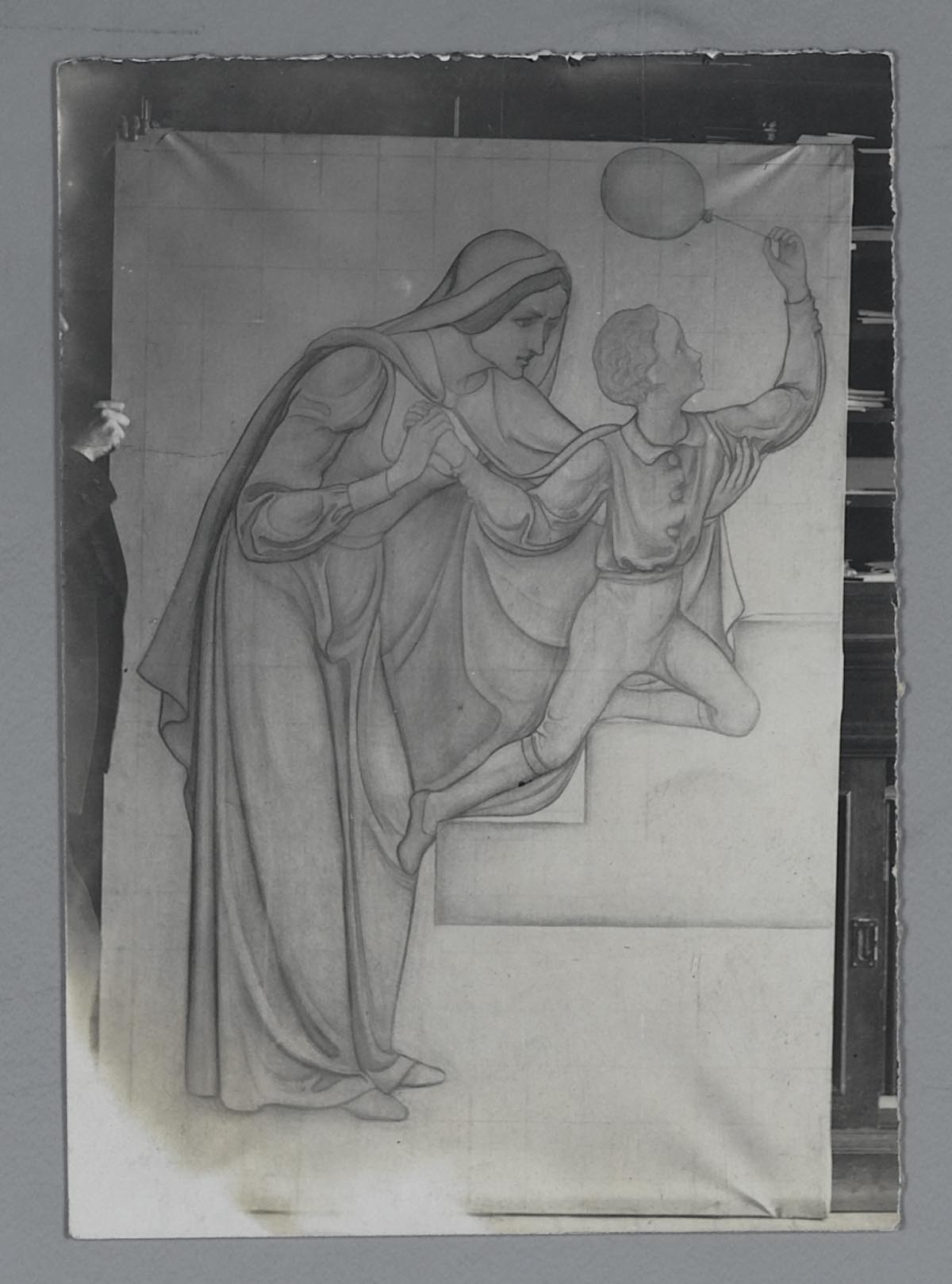
Mother with boy (study)

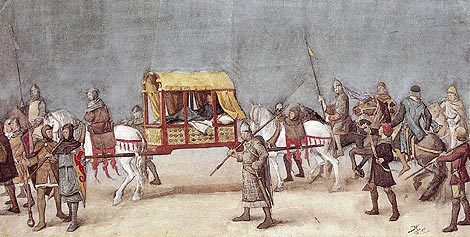
Aquarel of the procession on account of 700th anniversary of the foundation of ‘s-Hertogenbosch (1885)

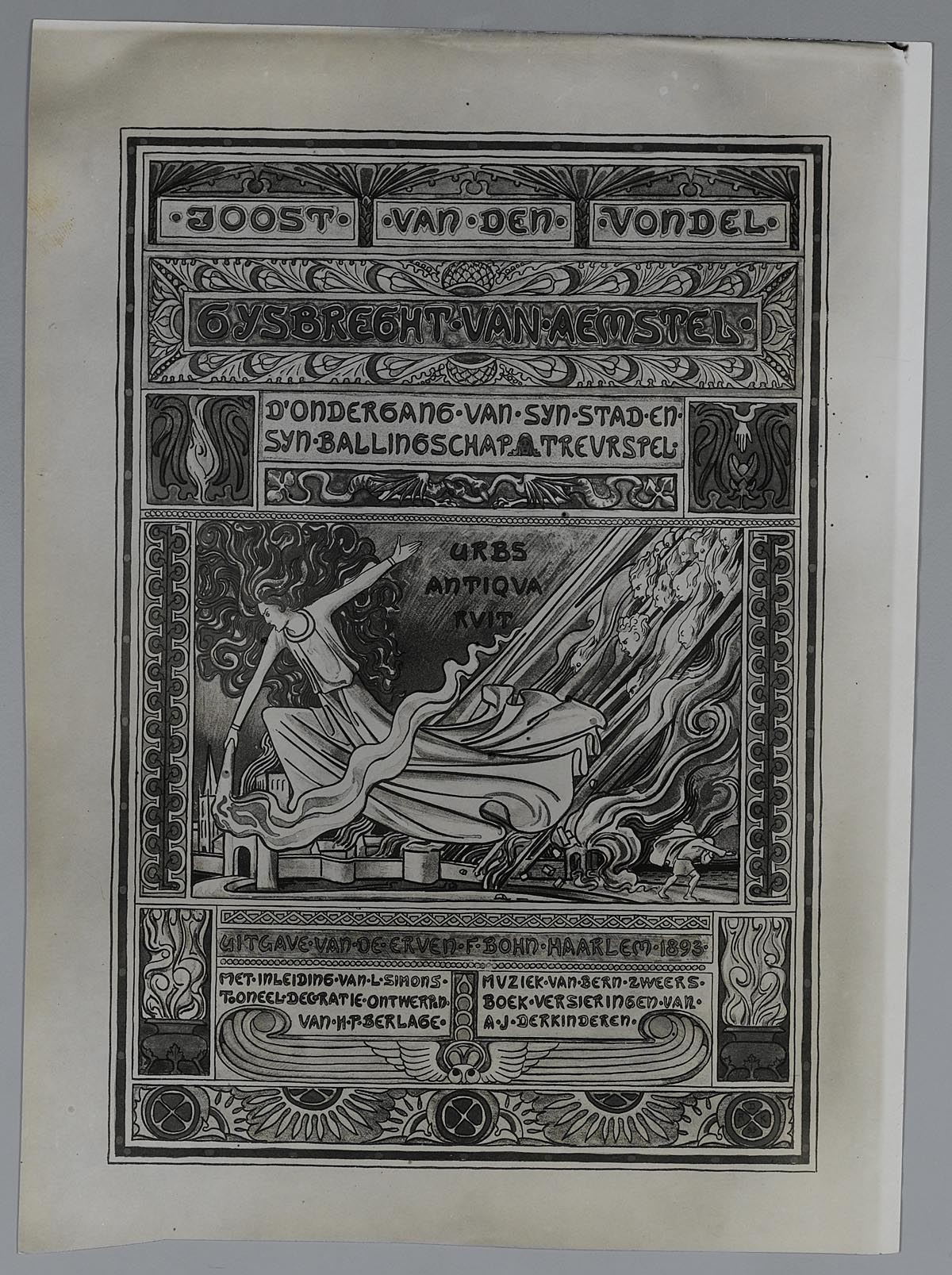
Frontispiece of Gijsbrecht van Aemstel (1893)

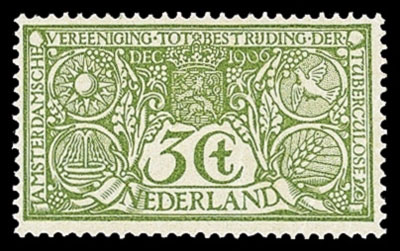
Stamp (1906)

=== Paintings ===
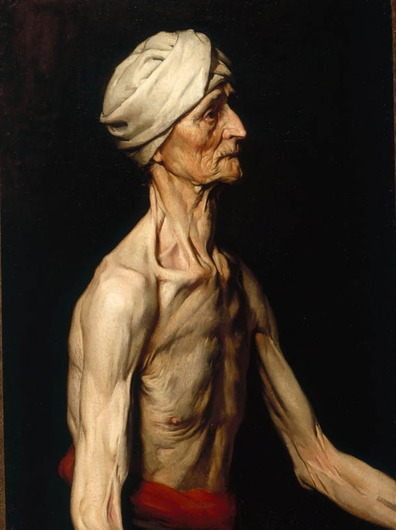
Study of semi-nude man with turban, 1885

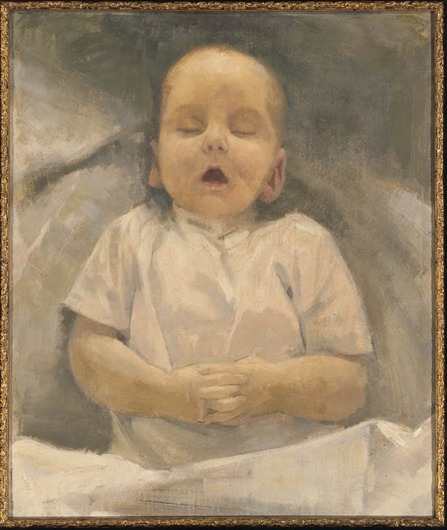
Dead baby, 1886

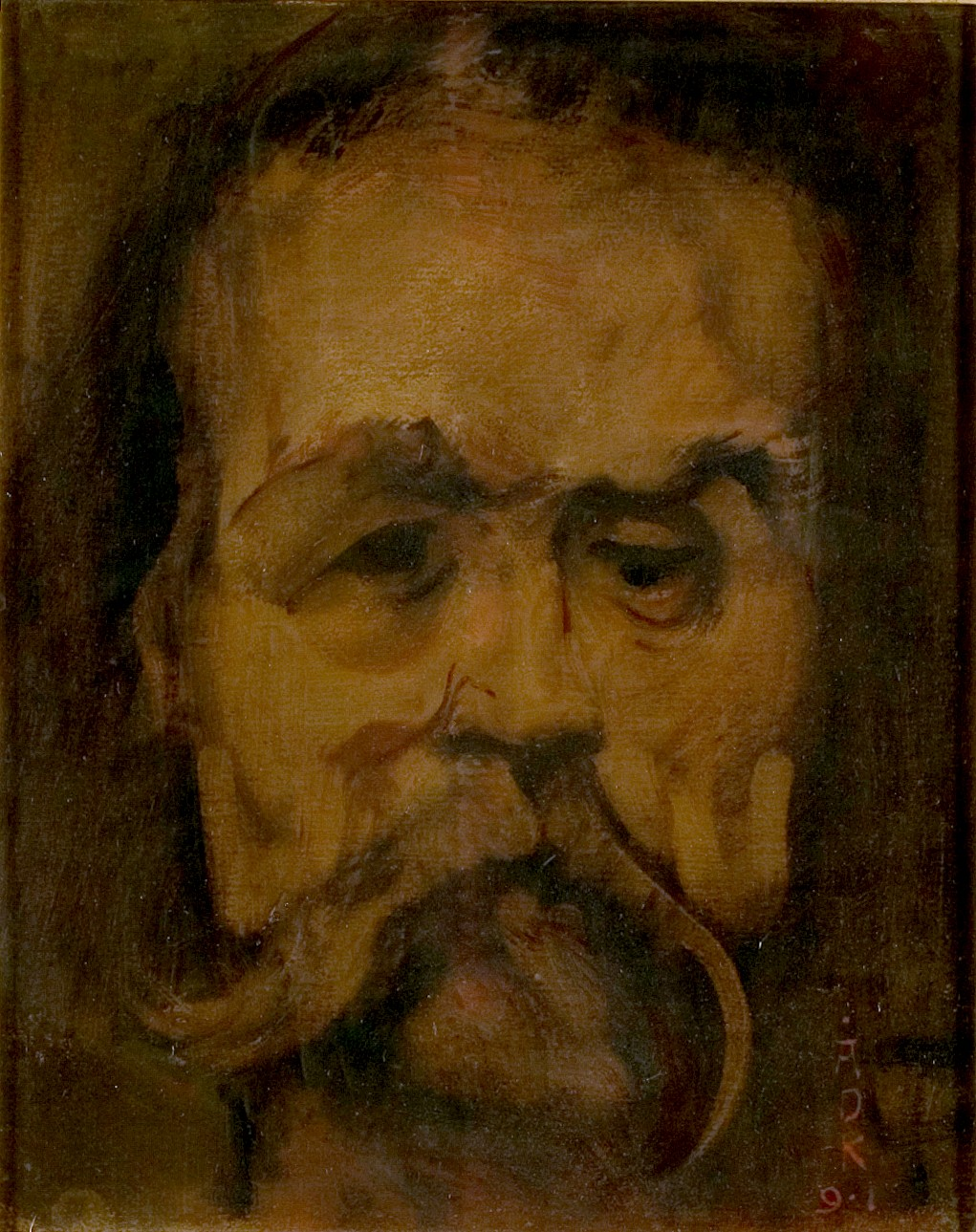
Portrait of Stéphane Mallarmé, 1891

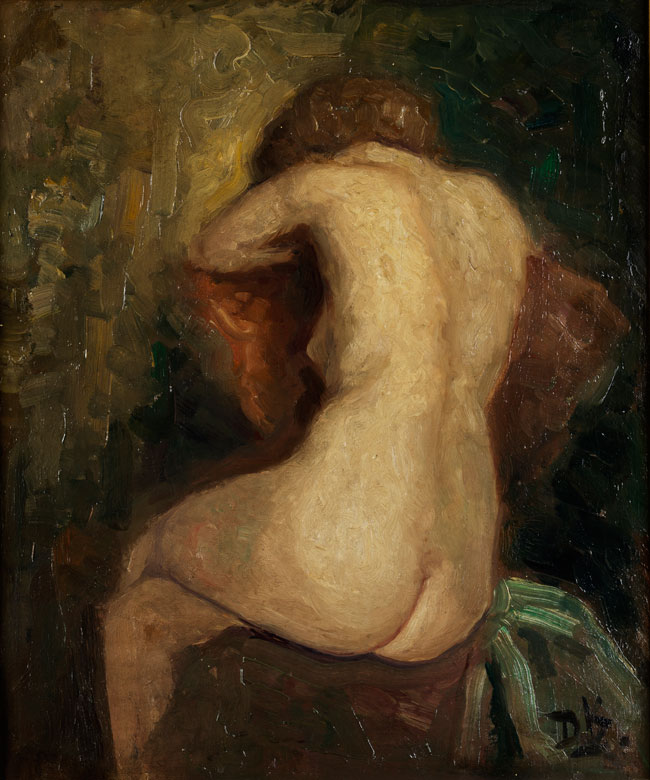
Nude, 1900-1910
